= Maurice Frederick of Nassau-Siegen =

German count and officer in the Dutch Army (1621–1638)

- Count Maurice Frederick of Nassau-Siegen. Detail from a painting attributed to Wybrand de Geest, 1635–1640. Foundation Historical Collections of the House of Orange-Nassau, The Hague.

- Coat of arms
- Full name: Maurice Frederick Count of Nassau-Siegen
- Native name: Moritz Friedrich Graf von Nassau-Siegen
- Born: Moritz Friedrich Graf zu Nassau, Katzenelnbogen, Vianden und Diez, Herr zu Beilstein; 19 January 1621; Siegen Castle
- Died: 17 June 1638 (aged 17); Calloo
- Buried: Heusden
- Noble family: House of Nassau-Siegen
- Spouse: –
- Issue: –
- Father: William of Nassau-Siegen
- Mother: Christiane of Erbach
- Occupation: Captain in the Dutch States Army

Count Maurice Frederick of Nassau-Siegen (19 January 1621 – 17 June 1638), German: Moritz Friedrich Graf von Nassau-Siegen, official titles: Graf zu Nassau, Katzenelnbogen, Vianden und Diez, Herr zu Beilstein, was a count from the House of Nassau-Siegen, a cadet branch of the Ottonian Line of the House of Nassau. He served as an officer in the Dutch States Army. In the propaganda for the House of Orange, he is regarded as one of the twelve heroes of the House of Nassau who gave their lives in the Eighty Years' War for the freedom of the Dutch people.

== Biography ==
Maurice Frederick was born at Siegen Castle on 19 January 1621 (Note: "Dek (1970) and Europäische Stammtafeln give the date 20-1, but a notification of the birth (see State Archives Marburg 115, 2, 340) dated Siegen 19-1-1621 mentions that the birth took place «heute dato».") as the second son of Count William of Nassau-Siegen and Countess Christiane of Erbach.

Maurice Frederick became a student at Leiden University on 3 September 1633, and on 27 May 1636 he was appointed captain of a infantry company in the Dutch States Army, where his father was field marshal.

Prince Frederick Henry of Orange, who intended to lay siege to Antwerp, entrusted Maurice Frederick's father with an important undertaking in 1638, the occupation of the levee at Calloo. William conquered the sconces of Stabroek and Calloo and chased off the Spaniards, but instead of continuing his march, he reinforced himself on the spot. When he heard the false rumour that the Spaniards were approaching with a greater force than his own, he fled in confusion. On 17 June he suffered a considerable loss of 2,000 men. Maurice Frederick was one of those who fell in this Battle of Calloo. He was buried at Heusden.

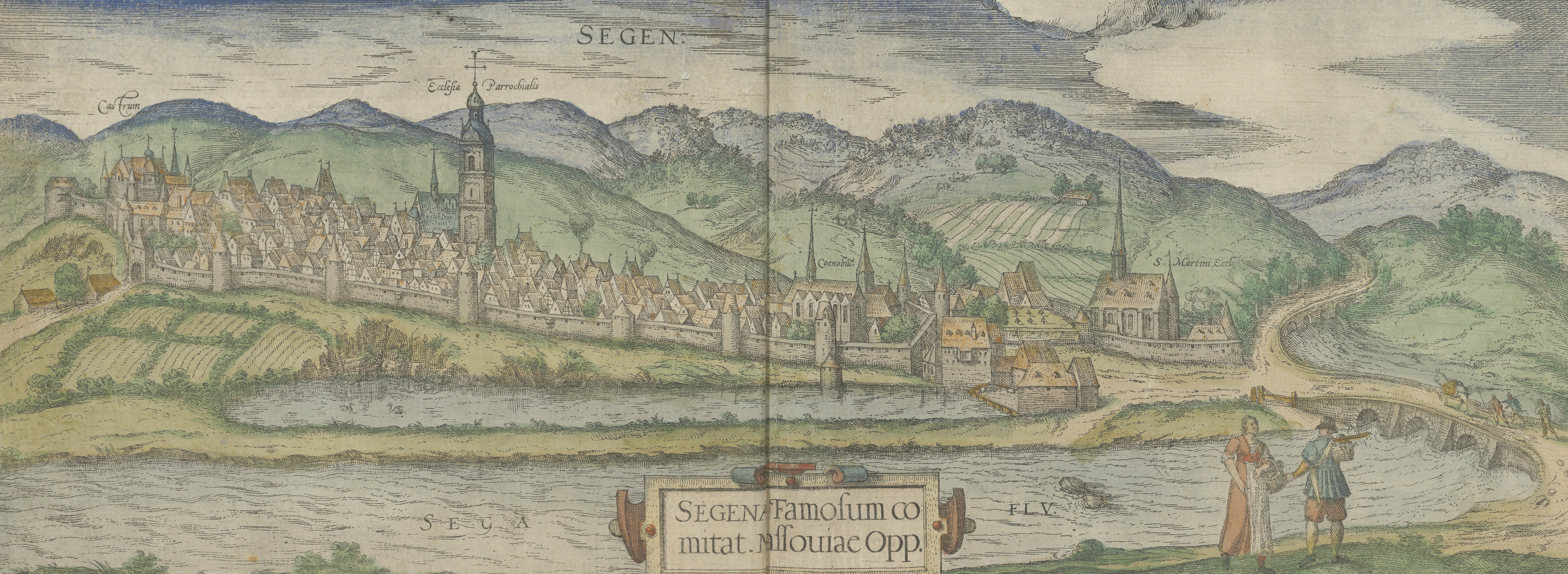
Siegen in 1617. From Braun & Hogenberg, Civitates orbis terrarum Band 6, Cologne, 1617. On the left Siegen Castle.

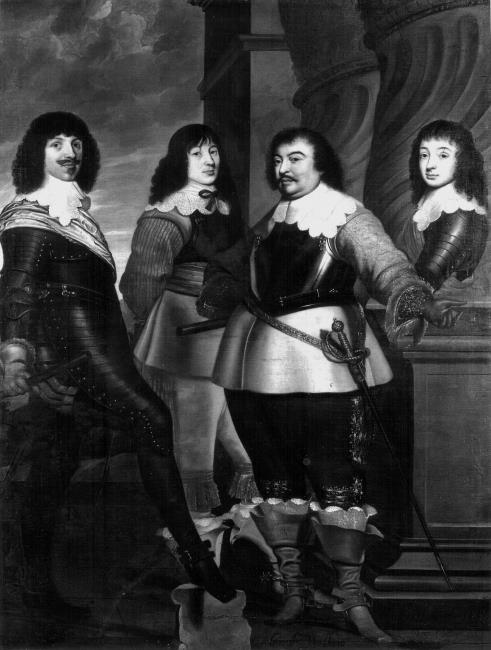
Group portrait of Count William of Nassau-Siegen with his son Maurice Frederick and his halfbrothers William Otto and Christian.

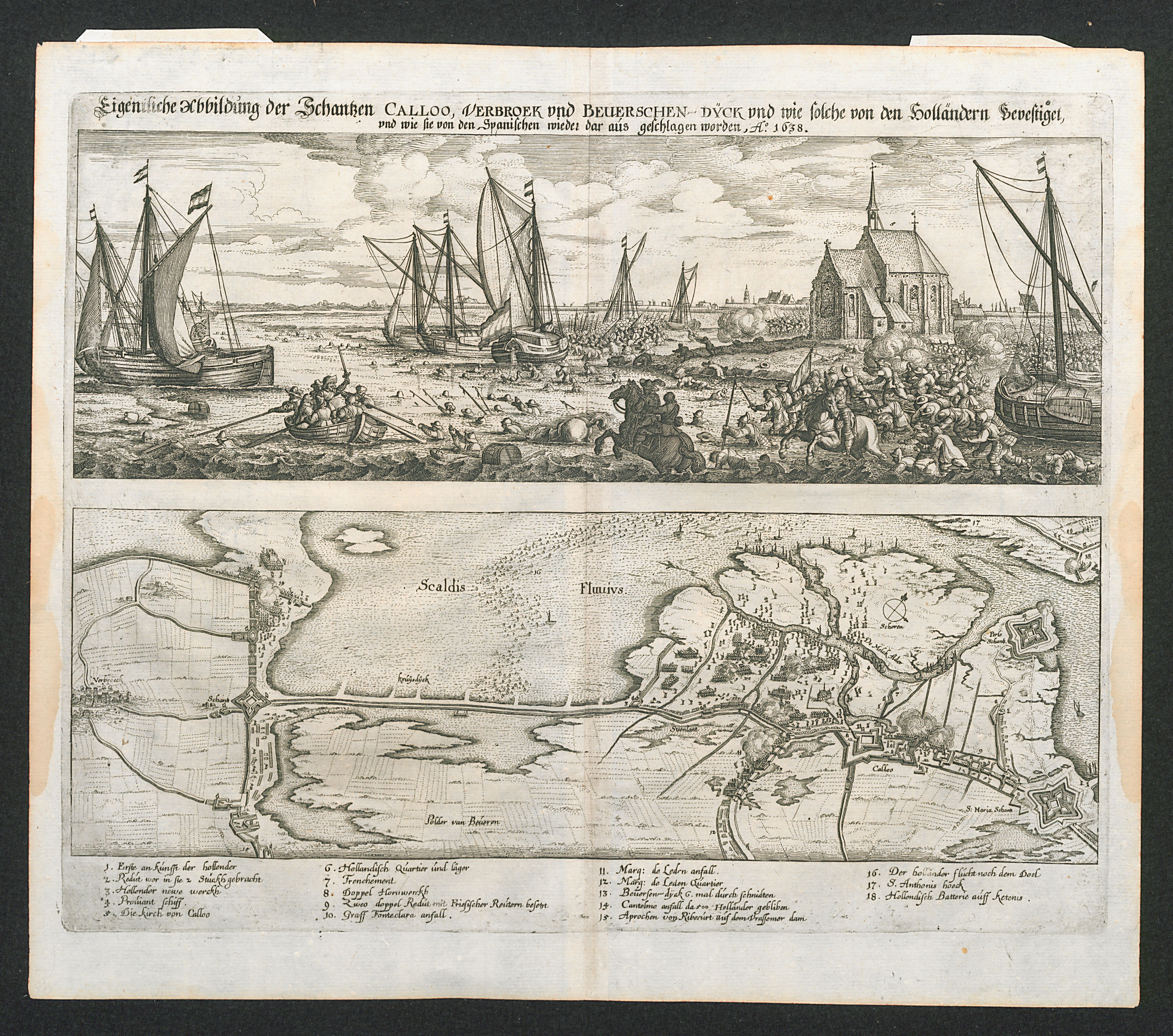
The Battle of Calloo. Anonymous etching, 1638.

== Ancestors ==
Ancestors of Maurice Frederick of Nassau-Siegen
Great-great-grandparents	William I 'the Rich' of Nassau-Siegen (1487–1559) ⚭ 1531; Juliane of Stolberg-Wernigerode (1506–1580)	George III of Leuchtenberg (1502–1555) ⚭ 1528; Barbara of Brandenburg-Ansbach (1495–1552)	Henry VIII of Waldeck-Wildungen (1465–1513) ⚭ before 1492; Anastasia of Runkel (?–1502/03)	Salentin VII of Isenburg-Grenzau (before 1470–1534) ⚭ Elisabeth of Hunolstein-Neumagen (ca. 1475–1536/38)	Eberhard XI of Erbach (1475–1539) ⚭ 1503; Mary of Wertheim (1485–1553)	Philip of Salm-Dhaun (1492–1521) ⚭ 1514; Antoinette of Neufchatel (1496–1544)	Wolfgang of Barby and Mühlingen (1502–1564) ⚭ 1526; Agnes of Mansfeld-Hinterort (1511–1558)	John II of Anhalt-Zerbst (1504–1551) ⚭ 1534; Margaret of Brandenburg (1511–1577)
Great-grandparents	John VI 'the Elder' of Nassau-Siegen (1536–1606) ⚭ 1559; Elisabeth of Leuchtenberg (1537–1579)		Philip IV of Waldeck-Wildungen (1493–1574) ⚭ 1554; Jutta of Isenburg-Grenzau (?–1564)		Eberhard XII of Erbach (1511–1564) ⚭ 1538; Margaret of Salm-Dhaun (1521–1576)		Albrecht X of Barby and Mühlingen (1534–1588) ⚭ 1559; Mary of Anhalt-Zerbst (1538–1563)	
Grandparents	John VII 'the Middle' of Nassau-Siegen (1561–1623) ⚭ 1581; Magdalene of Waldeck-Wildungen (1558–1599)				George III of Erbach (1548–1605) ⚭ 1592; Mary of Barby and Mühlingen (1563–1619)			
Parents	William of Nassau-Siegen (1592–1642) ⚭ 1619; Christiane of Erbach (1596–1646)							

== Sources ==
- Van der Aa, A.J. (1877). "Willem, graaf van Nassau". Biographisch Woordenboek der Nederlanden, bevattende levensbeschrijvingen van zoodanige personen, die zich op eenigerlei wijze in ons vaderland hebben vermaard gemaakt (in Dutch). Vol. Twintigste deel. Haarlem: J.J. van Brederode. pp. 269–270.
- Aßmann, Helmut & Menk, Friedhelm (1996). Auf den Spuren von Nassau und Oranien in Siegen (in German). Siegen: Gesellschaft für Stadtmarketing Siegen e.V.
- Behr, Kamill (1854). Genealogie der in Europa regierenden Fürstenhäuser (in German). Leipzig: Verlag von Bernhard Tauchnitz.
- Blok, P.J. (1911). "Willem, Wilhelm". In Molhuysen, P.C. & Blok, P.J. (eds.). Nieuw Nederlandsch Biografisch Woordenboek (in Dutch). Vol. Eerste deel. Leiden: A.W. Sijthoff. p. 1572.
- Dek, A.W.E. (1962). Graf Johann der Mittlere von Nassau-Siegen und seine 25 Kinder (in German). Rijswijk: Krips Repro.
- Dek, A.W.E. (1968). "De afstammelingen van Juliana van Stolberg tot aan het jaar van de Vrede van Münster". Spiegel der Historie. Maandblad voor de geschiedenis der Nederlanden (in Dutch). 1968 (7/8): 228–303.
- Dek, A.W.E. (1970). Genealogie van het Vorstenhuis Nassau (in Dutch). Zaltbommel: Europese Bibliotheek.
- von Ehrenkrook, Hans Friedrich; Förster, Karl & Marchtaler, Kurt Erhard (1928). Ahnenreihen aus allen deutschen Gauen. Beilage zum Archiv für Sippenforschung und allen verwandten Gebieten (in German). Görlitz: Verlag für Sippenforschung und Wappenkunde C.A. Starke.
- Hoffmeister, Jacob Christoph Carl (1883). Historisch-genealogisches Handbuch über alle Grafen und Fürsten von Waldeck und Pyrmont seit 1228 (in German). Cassel: Verlag Gustav Klaunig.
- Huberty, Michel; Giraud, Alain & Magdelaine, F. & B. (1981). l'Allemagne Dynastique (in French). Vol. Tome III: Brunswick-Nassau-Schwarzbourg. Le Perreux: Alain Giraud.
- Huberty, Michel; Giraud, Alain & Magdelaine, F. & B. (1987). l'Allemagne Dynastique (in French). Vol. Tome V: Hohenzollern-Waldeck-Familles alliées A-B. Le Perreux-sur-Marne: Alain Giraud.
- Lück, Alfred (1981) [1967]. Siegerland und Nederland (in German) (2nd ed.). Siegen: Siegerländer Heimatverein e.V.
- Menk, Friedhelm (1967). "Wilhelm Graf zu Nassau-Siegen (1592–1642)". Siegerland (in German). Band XLIV (Heft 2): 53–59.
- Menk, Friedhelm (1971). Quellen zur Geschichte des Siegerlandes im niederländischen königlichen Hausarchiv (in German). Siegen: Stadt Siegen/Forschungsstelle Siegerland.
- Muller, P.L. (1898). "Wilhelm (Graf von Nassau-Siegen und Dillenburg)". Allgemeine Deutsche Biographie (in German). Vol. Band 43. Leipzig: Duncker & Humblot. p. 133.
- Poelhekke, J.J. (1978). Frederik Hendrik, Prins van Oranje. Een biografisch drieluik (PDF) (in Dutch). Zutphen: De Walburg Pers. ISBN 90-6011-443-4.
- Textor von Haiger, Johann (1617). Nassauische Chronik (in German). Herborn: Christoph Raab.
- Vorsterman van Oyen, A.A. (1882). Het vorstenhuis Oranje-Nassau. Van de vroegste tijden tot heden (in Dutch). Leiden/Utrecht: A.W. Sijthoff/J.L. Beijers.
