= Christiane of Erbach =

German countess (1596–1646)

- Countess Consort of Nassau-Siegen
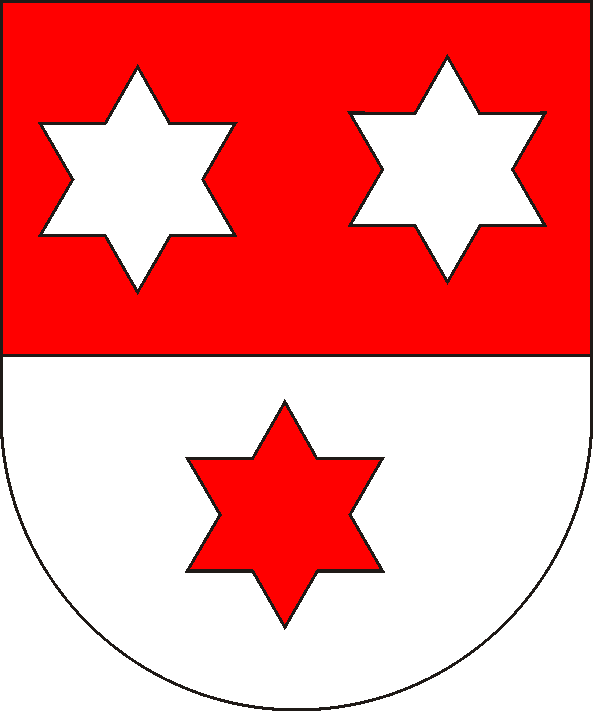
- Coat of arms
- Full name: Christiane Countess of Erbach
- Native name: Christiane Gräfin zu Erbach
- Born: 5 June 1596
- Died: 6 July 1646 (aged 50); Culemborg
- Buried: Heusden
- Noble family: House of Erbach
- Spouse: William of Nassau-Siegen
- Issue Detail: John William; Maurice Frederick; Mary Magdalene; Ernestine Juliane; Elisabeth Charlotte; Hollandine; Wilhelmine Christine
- Father: George III of Erbach
- Mother: Mary of Barby and Mühlingen

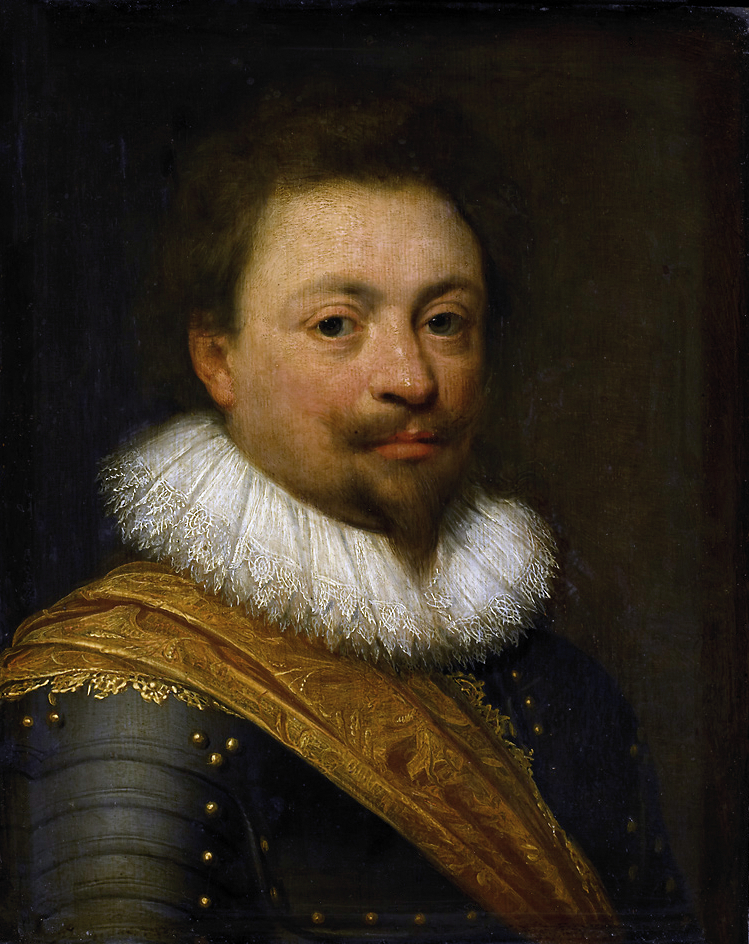
Count William of Nassau-Siegen (1592–1642), Christiane's husband. Studio of Jan Antonisz. van Ravesteyn, c. 1620–1630. Rijksmuseum Amsterdam.

Countess Christiane of Erbach (5 June 1596 – 6 July 1646), German: Christiane Gräfin zu Erbach, was a countess from the House of Erbach and through marriage Countess of Nassau-Siegen.

== Biography ==
Christiane was born on 5 June 1596 as the daughter of Count George III of Erbach (15 July 1548 – 26 February 1605) and Countess Mary of Barby and Mühlingen (8 April 1563 – 29 December 1619). She married at Siegen Castle on 17 January 1619 (Note: "The marriage is said to have taken place on 20-8-1616, according to Europäische Stammtafeln. Dek (1970) is closer to the truth when he puts forward the date of 16-1-1619 (without place). It is in fact on 17-1-1619 that the ceremony on the occasion of the baptism of John Ernest was celebrated, which had taken place on 10-1, old style, in Siegen (see State Archives Wiesbaden 170^{III}: Count Ernst Casimir of Nassau-Diez answers to his brother John the Middle of Nassau-Siegen about the marriage that followed the recent baptism in Siegen «auf nächstabgewichener Kindstauf zu Siegen mit dem Fraulein zu Erbach sein hochzeitliches Beilager gehalten»). See also Royal House Archive of the Netherlands (4/1591 II): John the Middle writes on 2‑1‑1619 in Siegen to his daughter Juliane with the request to arrive on the evening of the 16th to attend William's wedding on the 17th. On 3-1-1619, William personally requests the Landgrave of Hesse-Kassel to arrive on the 16th in the evening to attend his wedding that would take place «den 17 dieses allhier». It is the marriage contract that was signed on the 16th, in Siegen.") to Count William of Nassau-Siegen (Dillenburg, 13 August 1592 (Note: "Europäische Stammtafeln says he was born on 12-8-1592, a date confirmed by Dek (1970), with mention of the place of birth. But a notification from the father sent from Siegen of 24 August 1592 (see State Archives Wiesbaden 170^{III}, Korrespondenzen) indicates the date «13 hujus».") – Orsoy, 7/17 July 1642 (Note: "See Menk (1967), p. 57. The author establishes that the death took place in Orsoy (Lower Rhine) on Thursday 7/17 July 1642, between one and two o'clock in the afternoon, and bases himself on the documents found in the Royal House Archive of the Netherlands (IV, 1444): a notification addressed to the widow from Orsoy on 7/17 July 1642 («heute den 7/17 disses …») and an death announcement from a priest from Kampen («Donnerstag, den 7/17 juli 1642 zwischen 1 u. 2 Uhr nachmittags zu Orsoy …»).")), the fifth son of Count John VII the Middle of Nassau-Siegen and his first wife, Countess Magdalene of Waldeck-Wildungen. Christiane's older half-brother from her mother's side, Count Christian of Waldeck-Wildungen, was married in November 1604 to Elisabeth of Nassau-Siegen, William's eldest sister.

After the end of the Twelve Years' Truce in 1621, William entered the service of the Dutch States Army, where he was appointed colonel of the infantry on 24 July 1622. On 13/23 January 1624, Count John VIII the Younger of Nassau-Siegen voluntarily ceded the sovereignty over the Hilchenbach district with Ginsburg Castle and some villages belonging to the Ferndorf and Netphen districts, to his younger brother William. Henceforth the county of Nassau-Siegen had two governments, one in Siegen, the other in Hilchenbach. Christiane and William lived in Siegen until 1625. In 1625 William became governor of Emmerich and from 1626 to 1637 he was governor of Heusden. In April 1633 he was appointed field marshal as successor of his uncle Count Ernest Casimir of Nassau-Diez. In 1637 William became governor of Sluis. On 17 June 1638 he suffered a considerable loss of 2,000 men, including his son Maurice Frederick, in the Battle of Calloo. William died at Orsoy on 7/17 July 1642 and was buried at Heusden on 24 July 1642. He left his part of the county of Nassau-Siegen to his half-brother John Maurice. As field marshal of the Dutch States Army, he was succeeded by his brother-in-law Johan Wolfert van Brederode.

Count William Frederick of Nassau-Diez, the stadtholder of Friesland, noted in June 1645 in his diary that Christiane's youngest daughter, sixteen-year-old Wilhelmine Christine, was the favourite girlfriend of Prince William II of Orange, "die hij zoo dicwils custe als hij woude, alleen sijnde, en de borstjes tastede" ("whom he kissed as much as he wished, being alone, and touching the breasts"). William II had to promise Wilhelmine Christine "sich deechlijck te hauden" ("to stay decent"), but the consequence of this intimacy was that Christiane did not want her daughter to be alone with Prince William, "doch dat sie het allebeide sochten" ("but that they both sought it"). When Christiane came in "maeckte prins Wilhelm den slaepert" ("Prince William sneaked out").

Christiane died in Culemborg on 6 July 1646. (Note: "See Dek (1962). On the other hand, her daughter Mary Magdalene reports from Culemborg on 9-7-1646 that the death took place «auf den 1 huius des Vormittags um zehn Uhr».") She was buried in Heusden.

== Issue ==
From the marriage of Christiane and William, the following children were born:

1. John William (Siegen Castle, 28 October 1619 (Note: "Europäische Stammtafeln and Dek (1970) write that he was born on 23-1-1620, which is absolutely incorrect: see State Archives Marburg 115, 2, 340, a notification addressed to the brother from Siegen on 29-10-1619: «diese vergangene Nacht». A document attached to his death notification also confirms this: «gebohren den 28ten 8ber intra 9 et 10».") – Siegen Castle, 25 August 1623^{Jul.} (Note: "See State Archives Marburg (115, Waldeck, 2). A notification dated Siegen 25-8-1623 announces the death «gestrigen Sonntags (or Montags, the first letter, corrected, is illegible) zu morgen», which does not seem to correspond to the statement of the genealogists (Europäische Stammtafeln, Dek (1970), etc.) which indicate that he died on the 25th. But attached to this notification is a document stating that the child died on 25 August «intra 4 et 5». Therefore, it must be assumed that the author of the notification made a mistake, which he tried to correct by changing one letter of the word, as mentioned above. Since it is a Sunday or a Monday on the one hand, and 25-8 on the other, only the date Monday 25-8-1623 old style is acceptable. According to the new style, 25-8 fell on a Friday and 24 on a Thursday.")).
2. Maurice Frederick (Siegen Castle, 19 January 1621 (Note: "Dek (1970) and Europäische Stammtafeln give the date 20-1, but a notification of the birth (see State Archives Marburg 115, 2, 340) dated Siegen 19-1-1621 mentions that the birth took place «heute dato».") – Calloo, 17 June 1638), was a captain in the Dutch States Army, was killed in the Battle of Calloo.
3. Mary Magdalene (Siegen Castle, 21 October 1622 (Note: "Born on the 26th in Europäische Stammtafeln and Dek (1970), but a notification of birth, dated Siegen 1-11-1622, says: «jüngsthin den 21. abgelaufenen Monats 8bris». The place of birth must therefore be Siegen, where the parents lived until 1625 (see Menk (1967)). The inscription on the coffin reads: «nata XX Octobris MDCXXII ad fontes spadanos» (i.e. Spa, sic!). See Leiss (1928), p. 108.") – Spa, 20/30 August 1647 (Note: "See State Archives Wiesbaden (130^{II} 7826), notification of death, Spa 20/30‑8‑1647: «heut früe umb halbvier Uhr, alhir zu Spa».")), married in Culemborg on 25 August 1639 to Count Philip Theodore of Waldeck-Eisenberg (2 November 1614 – Korbach, 7 December 1645).
4. Ernestine Juliane (Siegen, 17/27 July 1624 – Heusden, 9 July 1634). (Note: "This young countess is not mentioned in any printed genealogy. However, she is mentioned in a handwritten family tree, which is kept in the Royal House Archive of the Netherlands. The places and dates mentioned are confirmed by official notifications (see State Archives Marburg 115, 2, 340). In the notification of the birth, sent from Siegen on 23-7-1624, it says that the event took place «Samssdagth den 17/27 hujus».")
5. Elisabeth Charlotte (Emmerich, 11 March 1626 (Note: "Born on 11-2-1626 at Europäische Stammtafeln I, 117; on 8-2-1626 at Europäische Stammtafeln I, 139 and on 11-3-1626 at Dek (1970). The latter date is confirmed by a notification preserved in the State Archives Marburg (115, Waldeck, 2) and dated Emmerik 12-3-1626: «gestriges tagks umb zwo Uhren vormittags».") – Culemborg, 16 November 1694^{Jul.} (Note: "See State Archives Wiesbaden (130^{II} 2183): notification of death «allhier den 16. dieses früh morgens zwischen 3 und 4 Uhr». The notification is dated Culemborg, unfortunately the date of dispatch is difficult to read: 10/20 or 18/28, making it impossible to establish the style of the death date with certainty. Hoffmeister (1883) wrongly claims it is the new style. There is in fact another notification (kept in the State Archives Karlsruhe Abt. 47 Nr. 1410) dated Culemborg 18-11 and stating that the Fürstin died «den 16/26 dieses früh morgens zw. 3 u. 4 Uhr». Therefore, it is 16 o.s.")), married in Culemborg on 29 November/9 December 1643 (Note: "See State Archives Wiesbaden (170^{III}), invitation from Culemborg 24-11-1643 for the wedding that will be celebrated «nächtskommenden Mittwoch den 29 November alten Kalenders auf meinem Hause». See the princely archives in Schloss Wittgenstein, F. 320 III, notification dated Culemborg 4-12-1643: «am verschienen Mittwoch 29. Novemberbris».") to Fürst George Frederick of Waldeck-Eisenberg (Arolsen, 31 January 1620^{Jul.} – Arolsen, 9 November 1692^{Jul.}).
6. Hollandine (Heusden, 2 March 1628 (Note: "See Dek (1962), pp. 83 and 118 (with reproduction of the notification of birth). See also notification of birth in State Archives Marburg (115, Waldeck, 2)." Strangely enough, Dek (1968), p. 276 and Dek (1970), p. 88 mention the date 6 March 1628.) – Heusden, 14 October 1629 (Note: "See notification of death in State Archives Marburg (115, Waldeck, 2).")).
7. Wilhelmine Christine (1629 (Note: "She was certainly not born in 1625, as Europäische Stammtafeln claims. She was baptised in Heusden on 10-6-1629 and probably born there. However, it should be noted that William of Nassau-Siegen notified the birth of his daughter on 31-5-1629 from Ortheim (See: State Archives Wiesbaden 170^{III}).") – Hildburghausen, 22 January 1700 (Note: "Died on 21-1-1700 according to Europäische Stammtafeln I, 117; on 22-1-1707 according to Europäische Stammtafeln I, 139 and Hoffmeister (1883), confirmed by Dek (1970), with Saalfeld as place of death. But the death does not occur in the parish registers of Saalfeld, neither in January 1700 nor in January 1707. Saalfeld must be excluded as a possible place of death. Waldeckischer Helden – und Regenten – Saal, a manuscript written in 1737 by the Geheimrat August von Klettenburg and preserved in the State Archives Marburg, mentions that the Fürstin died at Cuylenborg in Holland on 21-1-1700. It is possible that she was mistaken for her sister-in-law Juliane Elisabeth, who was called «Gräfin Cülenborg» and died in 1707, which seems to be a cause of the mistake for some authors who, as we have seen, have the Fürstin die in that year. Finally, in the book Bau und Kunstdenkmäler, Kreis der Eder is claimed that she died in Altwillungen Castle. None of these claims are true. The death certificate can be found in the parish registry of Hildburghausen, Stadtkirche, part I, p. 475 R, year 1700: «Die Hochgeb. Gräfin u. Frau Wilhelmine Christina Verwittibte Gräfin zu Waldeck Wildungen, gebohrene Gräfin zu Nassau usw. wird aus diesem Hochfürstl. Residence Schlosse, den 22. January seelig Entschlafen, den 27, abendts umb 7 Uhr in Hochansehentlichen Leichenprocess von hier auf bis vors thor Begleithet, und so ferner auf Saaltfeld gebracht worden.»")), married at Arolsen Castle on 26 January 1660 (Note: "Dek (1970): married in Helsen, suburb of Arolsen 26-1-1660. This is a misinterpretation of the marriage certificate. One does indeed find in the Helsen parish records, the marriage certificate, but in this one it says: «1660 den 26 Januar ist der Hochgeborene Graff und Herr, Herr Josias Graff zu Waldeck u. Piermont … mit der Hochgebohrenen Gräfinnen Frewlein Wilhelmine Christina, Frewlein von Nassau, Catzenelnbogen, Vianden u. Diez, uff Arolsen abends umb 7 Uhren copulirt worden». One finds the date 26‑1‑1659 in Europäische Stammtafeln I, 117.") to Count Josias II of Waldeck-Wildungen (Wildungen, 31 July 1636 – Kandia, 8 August 1669).

One of the daughters from this marriage was engaged to Count Crato of Nassau-Saarbrücken.

Maurice Frederick of Nassau-Siegen (1621–1638). Detail of a painting attributed to Wybrand de Geest, 1635–1640. Foundation Historical Collections of the House of Orange-Nassau, The Hague.

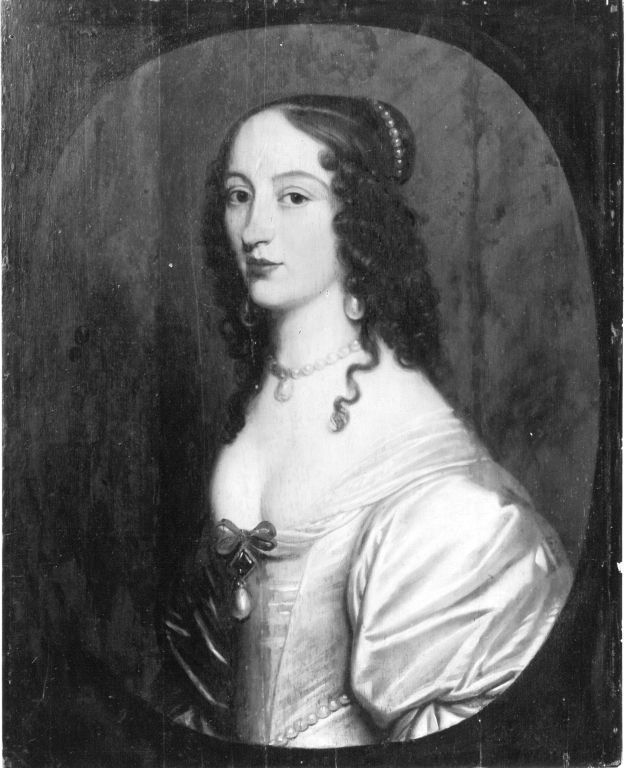
Mary Magdalene of Nassau-Siegen (1622–1647). Portrait by Gerard van Honthorst, c. 1639–1647. Bavarian State Painting Collections, Munich.

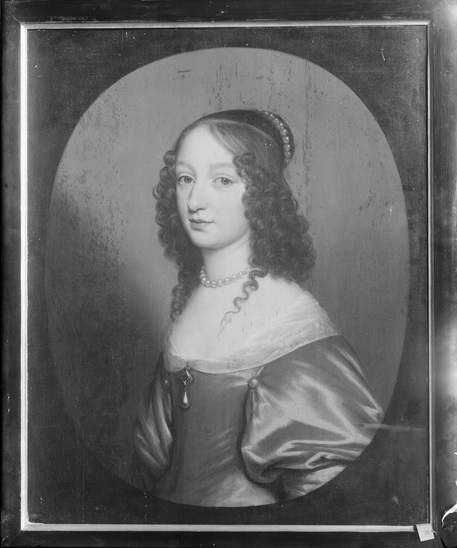
Wilhelmine Christine of Nassau-Siegen (1629–1700). Portrait by Gerard van Honthorst, c. 1640. Foundation Historical Collections of the House of Orange-Nassau, The Hague.

=== Known descendants ===
Christiane has several known descendants. Among them are:

- the German Emperors Wilhelm I, Frederick III and Wilhelm II,
- the monarchs George IV, William IV, Victoria, Edward VII, George V, Edward VIII, George VI, Elizabeth II and Charles III of the United Kingdom,
- the kings Leopold I, Leopold II, Albert I, Leopold III, Baudouin I, Albert II and Philippe I of the Belgians.
- the tsars Ferdinand I, Boris III and Simeon II of Bulgaria.
- the kings Ferdinand II, Pedro V, Luís I, Carlos I and Manuel II of Portugal,
- the grand dukes Adolph I, William IV, Marie-Adélaïde, Charlotte, Jean I and Henri I of Luxembourg,
- the Romanian writer Carmen Sylva.

== Ancestors ==
Ancestors of Christiane of Erbach
Great-great-grandparents	George I of Erbach (1440–1481) ⚭ 1472; Cordula of Fraunberg (d. 1501)	Michael II of Wertheim (d. 1531) ⚭ Barbara of Eberstein (d. 1529)	John VI of Salm-Dhaun (1461–1499) ⚭ 1480; Joanne of Moers-Saarwerden (1464–1510)	Ferdinand of Neufchatel (1452–1522) ⚭ 1485; Claude de Vergy (1465–1512)	Burchard of Barby and Mühlingen (1454–1505) ⚭ 1482; Magdalene of Mecklenburg (d. 1532)	Gebhard VII of Mansfeld-Hinterort (1478–1558) ⚭ 1510; Margaretha of Gleichen (c. 1495–1567)	Ernest I of Anhalt-Zerbst (d. 1516) ⚭ 1494; Margaret of Münsterberg (1473–1530)	Joachim I Nestor of Brandenburg (1484–1535) ⚭ 1502; Elisabeth of Denmark (1485–1555)
Great-grandparents	Eberhard XI of Erbach (1475–1539) ⚭ 1503; Mary of Wertheim (1485–1553)		Philip of Salm-Dhaun (1492–1521) ⚭ 1514; Antoinette of Neufchatel (1496–1544)		Wolfgang of Barby and Mühlingen (1502–1564) ⚭ 1526; Agnes of Mansfeld-Hinterort (1511–1558)		John V of Anhalt-Zerbst (1504–1551) ⚭ 1534; Margaret of Brandenburg (1511–1577)	
Grandparents	Eberhard XII of Erbach (1511–1564) ⚭ 1538; Margaret of Salm-Dhaun (1521–1576)				Albrecht X of Barby and Mühlingen (1534–1588) ⚭ 1559; Mary of Anhalt-Zerbst (1538–1563)			
Parents	George III of Erbach (1548–1605) ⚭ 1592; Mary of Barby and Mühlingen (1563–1619)							

== Sources ==
- Van der Aa, A.J. (1877). "Willem, graaf van Nassau". Biographisch Woordenboek der Nederlanden, bevattende levensbeschrijvingen van zoodanige personen, die zich op eenigerlei wijze in ons vaderland hebben vermaard gemaakt (in Dutch). Vol. Twintigste deel. Haarlem: J.J. van Brederode. pp. 269–270.
- Aßmann, Helmut & Menk, Friedhelm (1996). Auf den Spuren von Nassau und Oranien in Siegen (in German). Siegen: Gesellschaft für Stadtmarketing Siegen e.V.
- Blok, P.J. (1911). "Willem, Wilhelm". In Molhuysen, P.C. & Blok, P.J. (eds.). Nieuw Nederlandsch Biografisch Woordenboek (in Dutch). Vol. Eerste deel. Leiden: A.W. Sijthoff. p. 1572.
- Dek, A.W.E. (1962). Graf Johann der Mittlere von Nassau-Siegen und seine 25 Kinder (in German). Rijswijk: Krips Repro.
- Dek, A.W.E. (1968). "De afstammelingen van Juliana van Stolberg tot aan het jaar van de Vrede van Münster". Spiegel der Historie. Maandblad voor de geschiedenis der Nederlanden (in Dutch). 1968 (7/8): 228–303.
- Dek, A.W.E. (1970). Genealogie van het Vorstenhuis Nassau (in Dutch). Zaltbommel: Europese Bibliotheek.
- Hoffmeister, Jacob Christoph Carl (1883). Historisch-genealogisches Handbuch über alle Grafen und Fürsten von Waldeck und Pyrmont seit 1228 (in German). Cassel: Verlag Gustav Klaunig.
- Huberty, Michel; Giraud, Alain & Magdelaine, F. & B. (1981). l'Allemagne Dynastique (in French). Vol. Tome III: Brunswick-Nassau-Schwarzbourg. Le Perreux: Alain Giraud. ISBN 2-901138-03-9.
- Koenhein, A.J.M. & Heniger, J. (1999). "Johan Wolfert van Brederode 1599–1655 – 'In Opbloey neergetoghen'". In Koenhein, A.J.M.; Brederoo, P.; Will, Chr.; Heniger, J.; Leeuwenberg, H.L.Ph. & Den Hertog, P.T. (eds.). Johan Wolfert van Brederode 1599-1655. Een Hollands edelman tussen Nassau en Oranje (in Dutch). Vianen & Zutphen: Historische Vereniging Het Land van Brederode & Uitgeversmaatschappij Walburg Pers. pp. 9–46. ISBN 90-5730-034-6.
- Kooijmans, Luuc (2000). Liefde in opdracht. Het hofleven van Willem Frederik van Nassau (in Dutch). Amsterdam: Uitgeverij Bert Bakker. ISBN 90-351-2201-1.
- Leiss, Albert (1928). "Die gräflich und fürstlich waldeckischen Begräbnisstätten zu Corbach". Geschichtsblätter für Waldeck und Pyrmont (in German). Vol. Band XXV. pp. 98–114.
- Lück, Alfred (1981) [1967]. Siegerland und Nederland (in German) (2nd ed.). Siegen: Siegerländer Heimatverein e.V.
- Menk, Friedhelm (1967). "Wilhelm Graf zu Nassau-Siegen (1592–1642)". Siegerland (in German). Band XLIV (Heft 2): 53–59.
- Menk, Friedhelm (1971). Quellen zur Geschichte des Siegerlandes im niederländischen königlichen Hausarchiv (in German). Siegen: Stadt Siegen & Forschungsstelle Siegerland.
- Menk, Friedhelm (1979). "Johann Moritz Fürst zu Nassau-Siegen". Siegerland (in German). Band LVI (Heft 1–2): 1vv.
- Muller, P.L. (1898). "Wilhelm (Graf von Nassau-Siegen und Dillenburg)". Allgemeine Deutsche Biographie (in German). Vol. Band 43. Leipzig: Duncker & Humblot. p. 133.
- Poelhekke, J.J. (1978). Frederik Hendrik, Prins van Oranje. Een biografisch drieluik (PDF) (in Dutch). Zutphen: De Walburg Pers. ISBN 90-6011-443-4.
- Textor von Haiger, Johann (1617). Nassauische Chronik. In welcher des vralt, hochlöblich, vnd weitberühmten Stamms vom Hause Naßaw, Printzen vnd Graven Genealogi oder Stammbaum: deren geburt, leben, heurath, kinder, zu Friden- vnd Kriegszeiten verzichtete sachen und thaten, absterben, und sonst denckwürdige Geschichten. Sampt einer kurtzen general Nassoviae und special Beschreibung der Graf- und Herschaften Naßaw-Catzenelnbogen, etc (in German). Herborn: Christoph Raab.
- Vorsterman van Oyen, A.A. (1882). Het vorstenhuis Oranje-Nassau. Van de vroegste tijden tot heden (in Dutch). Leiden & Utrecht: A.W. Sijthoff & J.L. Beijers.

Christiane of Erbach House of Erbach Born: 5 June 1596 Died: 6 July 1646
Regnal titles
Vacant Title last held by Margaret of Schleswig-Holstein-Sonderburg	Countess Consort of Nassau-Siegen (Protestant branch); 13/23 January 1624 – 7/17 July 1642	Vacant Title next held by Ernestine Charlotte of Nassau-Schaumburg
