= Wilhelmine Christine of Nassau-Siegen =

German countess (1629–1700)

- Countess Consort of Waldeck-Wildungen
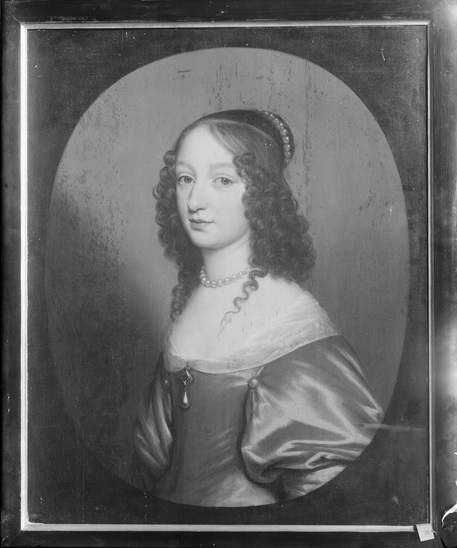
- Countess Wilhelmine Christine of Waldeck-Wildungen, nee Countess of Nassau-Siegen. Portrait by Gerard van Honthorst, c. 1640. Foundation Historical Collections of the House of Orange-Nassau, The Hague.

- Coat of arms
- Full name: Wilhelmine Christine Countess of Nassau-Siegen
- Native name: Wilhelmine Christine Gräfin von Nassau-Siegen
- Born: Wilhelmine Christine Gräfin zu Nassau, Katzenelnbogen, Vianden und Diez, Frau zu Beilstein; 1629
- Baptised: 10 June 1629; Heusden
- Died: 22 January 1700; Hildburghausen
- Buried: 27 January 1700; Saalfeld
- Noble family: House of Nassau-Siegen
- Spouse: Josias II of Waldeck-Wildungen
- Issue Detail: Charlotte Johanna, Duchess of Saxe-Saalfeld
- Father: William of Nassau-Siegen
- Mother: Christiane of Erbach

Countess Wilhelmine Christine of Nassau-Siegen (1629 – 22 January 1700), German: Wilhelmine Christine Gräfin von Nassau-Siegen, official titles: Gräfin zu Nassau, Katzenelnbogen, Vianden und Diez, Frau zu Beilstein, was a countess from the House of Nassau-Siegen, a cadet branch of the Ottonian Line of the House of Nassau, and through marriage Countess of Waldeck-Wildungen.

== Biography ==
Wilhelmine Christine was born in 1629 (Note: "She was certainly not born in 1625, as Europäische Stammtafeln claims. She was baptised in Heusden on 10-6-1629 and probably born there. However, it should be noted that William of Nassau-Siegen notified the birth of his daughter on 31-5-1629 from Ortheim (See: State Archives Wiesbaden 170^{III}).") as the youngest daughter of Count William of Nassau-Siegen and Countess Christiane of Erbach. The exact date and place of birth of Wilhelmine Christine are unknown; she was baptised on 10 June 1629 in Heusden, the city of which her father had been governor since 1626.

Count William Frederick of Nassau-Diez, the stadtholder of Friesland, noted in June 1645 in his diary that the sixteen-year-old Wilhelmine Christine was the favourite girlfriend of Prince William II of Orange, "die hij zoo dicwils custe als hij woude, alleen sijnde, en de borstjes tastede" ("whom he kissed as much as he wished, being alone, and touching the breasts"). William II had to promise Wilhelmine Christine "sich deechlijck te hauden" ("to stay decent"), but the consequence of this intimacy was that her mother Christiane did not want Wilhelmine Christine to be alone with Prince William, "doch dat sie het allebeide sochten" ("but that they both sought it"). When Christiane came in "maeckte prins Wilhelm den slaepert" ("Prince William sneaked out").

Also after the death of Christiane in 1646, the prince was still in contact with Wilhelmine Christine. In November 1648, William Frederick wrote in his diary that William had told him that he had secretly visited her dozens of times and had seen her in bed twice, but that he had stayed "degelijck" ("decent"), "niet als kussen en eens geraeckt, doch en passant en op het lest" ("nothing but kissing and touching, but in passing and at the last moment"). Earlier, William had mentioned that he would have wanted Wilhelmine Christine "heel" ("complete"); he would have preferred her as wife to anyone else.

Wilhelmine Christine married at Arolsen Castle on 26 January 1660 (Note: "Dek (1970): married in Helsen, suburb of Arolsen 26-1-1660. This is a misinterpretation of the marriage certificate. One does indeed find in the Helsen parish records, the marriage certificate, but in this one it says: «1660 den 26 Januar ist der Hochgeborene Graff und Herr, Herr Josias Graff zu Waldeck u. Piermont … mit der Hochgebohrenen Gräfinnen Frewlein Wilhelmine Christina, Frewlein von Nassau, Catzenelnbogen, Vianden u. Diez, uff Arolsen abends umb 7 Uhren copulirt worden». One finds the date 26‑1‑1659 in Europäische Stammtafeln I, 117.") to Count Josias II of Waldeck-Wildungen (Wildungen, 31 July 1636^{Jul.} (Note: Dek (1970), p. 88, Dek (1968), pp. 276 and 297, Hoffmeister (1883), p. 63 and Vorsterman van Oyen (1882), p. 117 mention the date 31 July 1636 without specification of the calendar they used.) – Kandia, 8 August 1669^{Greg.} (Note: von Poten (1896), p. 677 mentions the date 29 July. Dek (1970), p. 88, Dek (1968), pp. 276 and 297, Hoffmeister (1883), p. 63 and Vorsterman van Oyen (1882), p. 117 mention the date 8 August. Presumably, the former author calculated the date according to the Julian calendar and the latter authors according to the Gregorian calendar.)), the second son of Count Philip VII of Waldeck-Wildungen and Countess Anne Catherine of Sayn-Wittgenstein. In 1660 Josias was granted the district of Wildungen as an appanage, later also the districts of Wetterburg and Landau.

Wilhelmine Christine and Josias were closely related. Elisabeth of Nassau-Siegen, Josias' grandmother, was the eldest sister of Wilhelmine Christine's father. Also from his mother's side, Josias was related to Wilhelmine Christine. His great-grandmother, also named Elisabeth of Nassau-Siegen, was a younger sister of Count John VI 'the Elder' of Nassau-Siegen, the great-grandfather of Wilhelmine Christine. Agnes of Wied, the great-great-grandmother of Josias, was a daughter of yet another Elisabeth of Nassau-Siegen, a younger sister of Count William I 'the Rich' of Nassau-Siegen, who was also the great-great-grandfather of Wilhelmine Christine. Finally, both Wilhelmine Christine and Josias descended from Count Wolrad I of Waldeck-Waldeck, Wilhelmine Christine through her grandmother Magdalene of Waldeck-Wildungen.

Wilhelmine Christine outlived her husband by almost 31 years; she died in Hildburghausen on 22 January 1700 (Note: "Died on 21-1-1700 according to Europäische Stammtafeln I, 117; on 22-1-1707 according to Europäische Stammtafeln I, 139 and Hoffmeister (1883), confirmed by Dek (1970), with Saalfeld as place of death. But the death does not occur in the parish registers of Saalfeld, neither in January 1700 nor in January 1707. Saalfeld must be excluded as a possible place of death. Waldeckischer Helden – und Regenten – Saal, a manuscript written in 1737 by the Geheimrat August von Klettenburg and preserved in the State Archives Marburg, mentions that the Fürstin died at Cuylenborg in Holland on 21-1-1700. It is possible that she was mistaken for her sister-in-law Juliane Elisabeth, who was called «Gräfin Cülenborg» and died in 1707, which seems to be a cause of the mistake for some authors who, as we have seen, have the Fürstin die in that year. Finally, in the book Bau und Kunstdenkmäler, Kreis der Eder is claimed that she died in Altwillungen Castle. None of these claims are true. The death certificate can be found in the parish registry of Hildburghausen, Stadtkirche, part I, p. 475 R, year 1700: «Die Hochgeb. Gräfin u. Frau Wilhelmine Christina Verwittibte Gräfin zu Waldeck Wildungen, gebohrene Gräfin zu Nassau usw. wird aus diesem Hochfürstl. Residence Schlosse, den 22. January seelig Entschlafen, den 27, abendts umb 7 Uhr in Hochansehentlichen Leichenprocess von hier auf bis vors thor Begleithet, und so ferner auf Saaltfeld gebracht worden.»") and was buried in Saalfeld on 27 January.

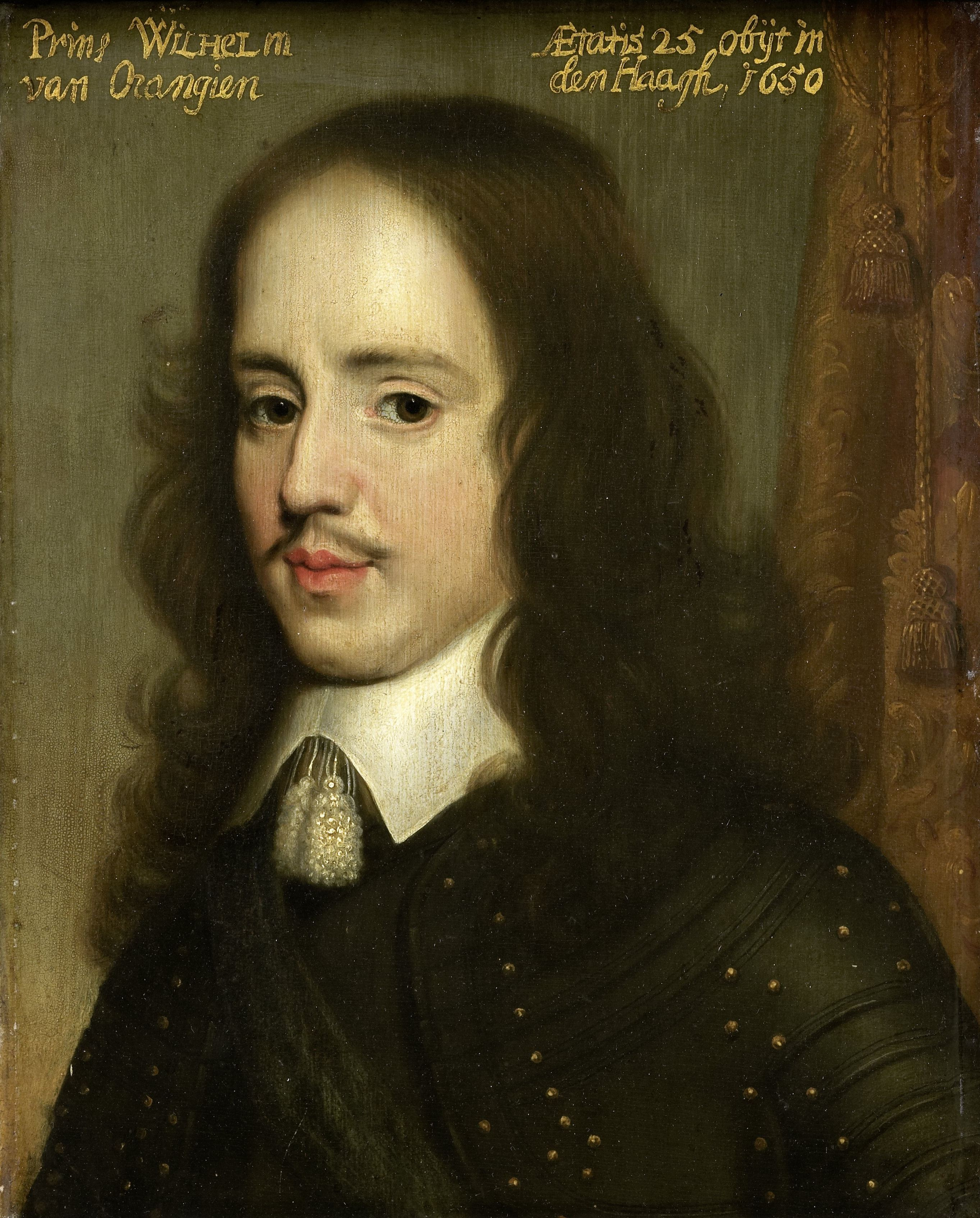
Prince William II of Orange. Portrait by Gerard van Honthorst, c. 1653. Rijksmuseum Amsterdam.

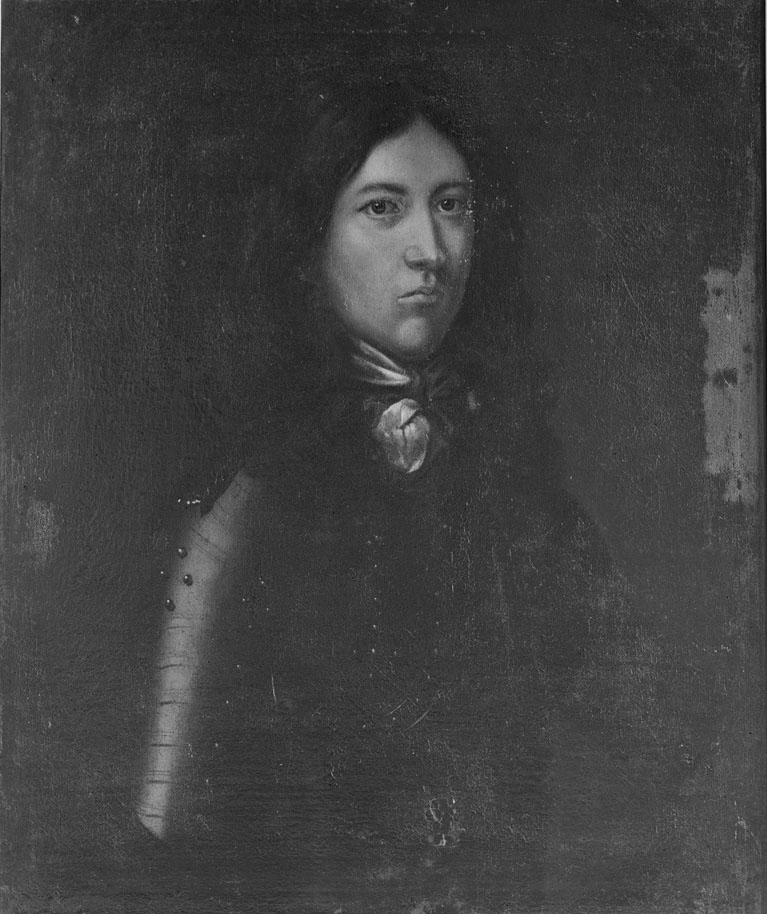
Count Josias II of Waldeck-Wildungen. Anonymous portrait, c. 1655–1660. Bergheim Castle.

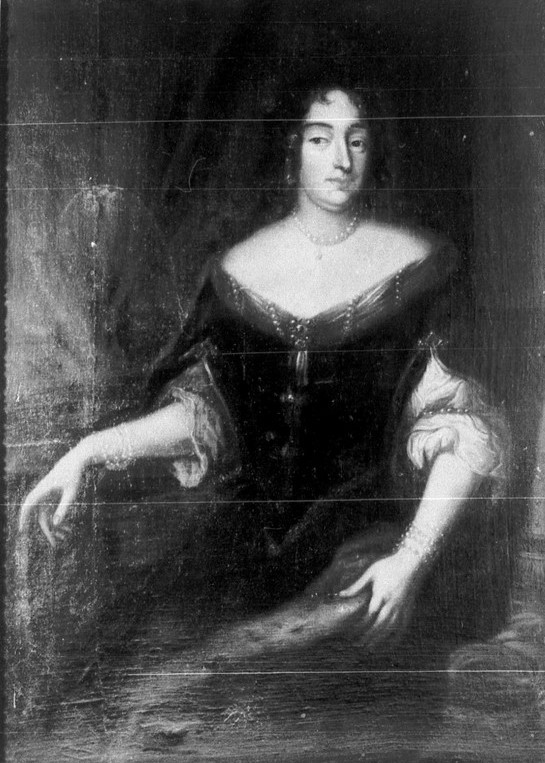
Countess Wilhelmine Christine of Nassau-Siegen. Anonymous portrait, c. 1650. Arolsen Castle.

== Issue ==
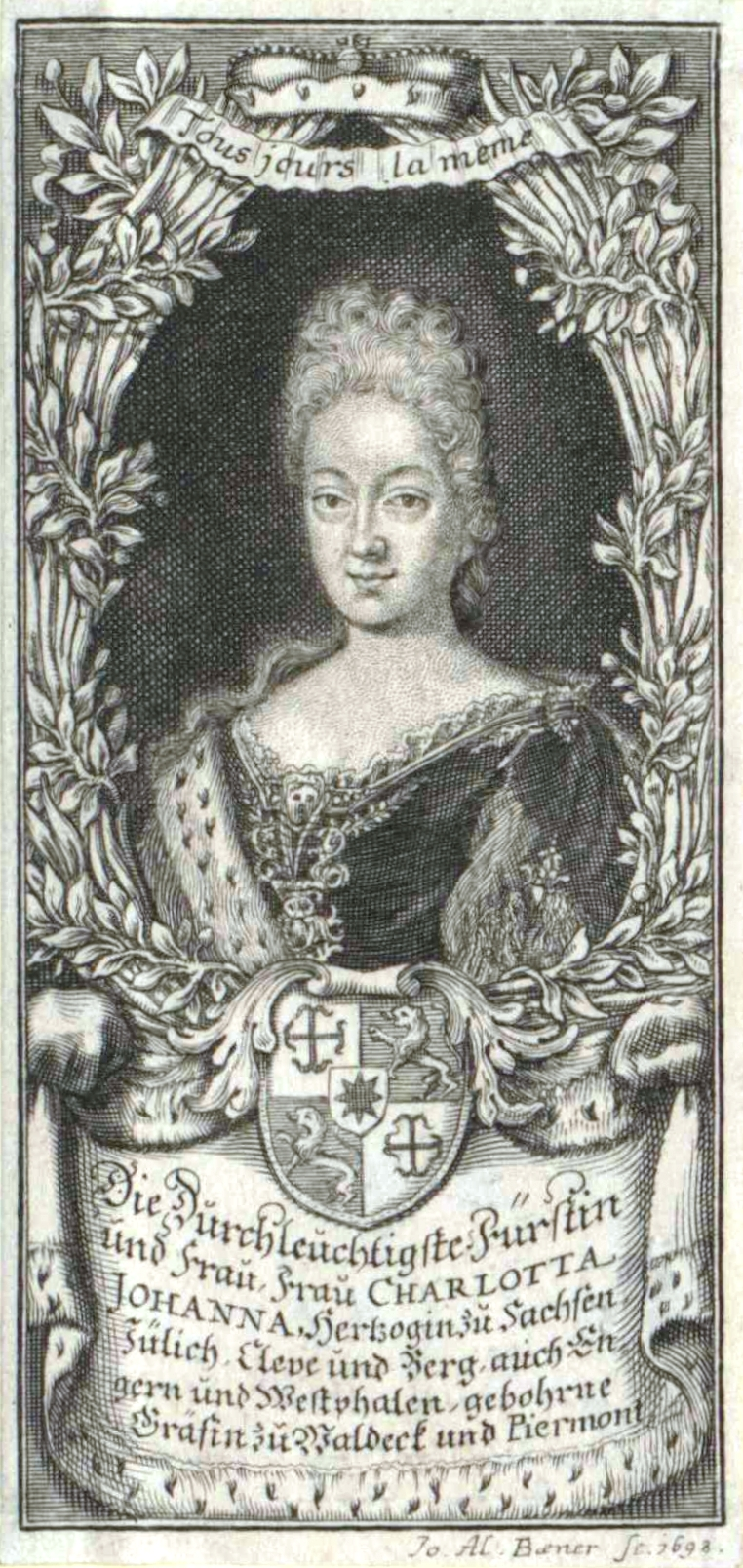
Charlotte Joanne of Waldeck-Wildungen (1664–1699). Engraving by Johann Alexander Böner, 1698. Bildarchiv Austria.

From the marriage of Wilhelmine Christine and Josias, the following children were born:

1. Eleonore Louise (Arolsen Castle, 9 July 1661 – Arolsen Castle, 25 August 1661).
2. William Philip (Arolsen Castle, 27 September 1662 – Arolsen Castle, 29 December 1662).
3. Charlotte Dorothea (Arolsen Castle, 9 October 1663 – Arolsen Castle, 10 December 1664).
4. Charlotte Johanna (Arolsen Castle, 13 December 1664 – Hildburghausen, 1 February 1699), married in Maastricht on 2 December 1690 to Duke John Ernest of Saxe-Saalfeld (Gotha, 22 August 1658 – Saalfeld, 17 December 1729).
5. Sophie Wilhelmine (Arolsen Castle, 24 September 1666 – 13 February 1668).
6. Maximilian Frederick (Arolsen Castle, 25 April 1668 – Arolsen Castle, September 1668).
7. William Gustavus (Arolsen Castle, 25 April 1668 – Arolsen Castle, 21 May 1669).

=== Known descendants ===
Wilhelmine Christine has several known descendants. Among them are:

- the monarchs Victoria, Edward VII, George V, Edward VIII, George VI, Elizabeth II and Charles III of the United Kingdom,
- the kings Leopold I, Leopold II, Albert I, Leopold III, Baudouin I, Albert II and Philippe I of the Belgians.
- the tsars Ferdinand I, Boris III and Simeon II of Bulgaria.
- the kings Ferdinand II, Pedro V, Luís I, Carlos I and Manuel II of Portugal,
- Grand Duke Henri I of Luxembourg.

== Ancestors ==
Ancestors of Wilhelmine Christine of Nassau-Siegen
Great-great-grandparents	William I 'the Rich' of Nassau-Siegen (1487–1559) ⚭ 1531; Juliane of Stolberg-Wernigerode (1506–1580)	George III of Leuchtenberg (1502–1555) ⚭ 1528; Barbara of Brandenburg-Ansbach (1495–1552)	Henry VIII of Waldeck-Wildungen (1465–1513) ⚭ before 1492; Anastasia of Runkel (?–1502/03)	Salentin VII of Isenburg-Grenzau (before 1470–1534) ⚭ Elisabeth of Hunolstein-Neumagen (ca. 1475–1536/38)	Eberhard XI of Erbach (1475–1539) ⚭ 1503; Mary of Wertheim (1485–1553)	Philip of Salm-Dhaun (1492–1521) ⚭ 1514; Antoinette of Neufchatel (1496–1544)	Wolfgang of Barby and Mühlingen (1502–1564) ⚭ 1526; Agnes of Mansfeld-Hinterort (1511–1558)	John II of Anhalt-Zerbst (1504–1551) ⚭ 1534; Margaret of Brandenburg (1511–1577)
Great-grandparents	John VI 'the Elder' of Nassau-Siegen (1536–1606) ⚭ 1559; Elisabeth of Leuchtenberg (1537–1579)		Philip IV of Waldeck-Wildungen (1493–1574) ⚭ 1554; Jutta of Isenburg-Grenzau (?–1564)		Eberhard XII of Erbach (1511–1564) ⚭ 1538; Margaret of Salm-Dhaun (1521–1576)		Albrecht X of Barby and Mühlingen (1534–1588) ⚭ 1559; Mary of Anhalt-Zerbst (1538–1563)	
Grandparents	John VII 'the Middle' of Nassau-Siegen (1561–1623) ⚭ 1581; Magdalene of Waldeck-Wildungen (1558–1599)				George III of Erbach (1548–1605) ⚭ 1592; Mary of Barby and Mühlingen (1563–1619)			
Parents	William of Nassau-Siegen (1592–1642) ⚭ 1619; Christiane of Erbach (1596–1646)							

== Sources ==
- Bastiaensen, Jean (1999). Prins Filip & Prinses Mathilde. Twee families met geschiedenis (in Dutch). Leuven: Uitgeverij Van Halewyck. ISBN 90-5617-262-X.
- Behr, Kamill (1854). Genealogie der in Europa regierenden Fürstenhäuser (in German). Leipzig: Verlag von Bernhard Tauchnitz.
- Dek, A.W.E. (1962). Graf Johann der Mittlere von Nassau-Siegen und seine 25 Kinder (in German). Rijswijk: Krips Repro.
- Dek, A.W.E. (1968). "De afstammelingen van Juliana van Stolberg tot aan het jaar van de Vrede van Münster". Spiegel der Historie. Maandblad voor de geschiedenis der Nederlanden (in Dutch). 1968 (7/8): 228–303.
- Dek, A.W.E. (1970). Genealogie van het Vorstenhuis Nassau (in Dutch). Zaltbommel: Europese Bibliotheek.
- von Ehrenkrook, Hans Friedrich; Förster, Karl & Marchtaler, Kurt Erhard (1928). Ahnenreihen aus allen deutschen Gauen. Beilage zum Archiv für Sippenforschung und allen verwandten Gebieten (in German). Görlitz: Verlag für Sippenforschung und Wappenkunde C.A. Starke.
- Haarmann, Torsten (2014). Das Haus Waldeck und Pyrmont. Mehr als 900 Jahre Gesamtgeschichte mit Stammfolge. Deutsche Fürstenhäuser (in German). Vol. Heft 35. Werl: Börde-Verlag. ISBN 978-3-981-4458-2-4.
- Hoffmeister, Jacob Christoph Carl (1883). Historisch-genealogisches Handbuch über alle Grafen und Fürsten von Waldeck und Pyrmont seit 1228 (in German). Cassel: Verlag Gustav Klaunig.
- Huberty, Michel; Giraud, Alain & Magdelaine, F. & B. (1976). l'Allemagne Dynastique (in French). Vol. Tome I: Hesse-Reuss-Saxe. Le Perreux: Alain Giraud.
- Huberty, Michel; Giraud, Alain & Magdelaine, F. & B. (1981). l'Allemagne Dynastique (in French). Vol. Tome III: Brunswick-Nassau-Schwarzbourg. Le Perreux: Alain Giraud.
- Huberty, Michel; Giraud, Alain & Magdelaine, F. & B. (1987). l'Allemagne Dynastique (in French). Vol. Tome V: Hohenzollern-Waldeck-Familles alliées A-B. Le Perreux-sur-Marne: Alain Giraud.
- Kooijmans, Luuc (2000). Liefde in opdracht. Het hofleven van Willem Frederik van Nassau (in Dutch). Amsterdam: Uitgeverij Bert Bakker. ISBN 90-351-2201-1.
- Menk, Friedhelm (1971). Quellen zur Geschichte des Siegerlandes im niederländischen königlichen Hausarchiv (in German). Siegen: Stadt Siegen/Forschungsstelle Siegerland.
- Menk, Gerhard (1992). Georg Friedrich von Waldeck 1620–1692. Eine biographische Skizze. Waldeckische Historische Hefte (in German). Vol. Band 3. Arolsen: Waldeckischer Geschichtsverein e.V. ISBN 3-9802226-5-9.
- von Poten, Bernhard (1896). "Waldeck, Josias Graf". Allgemeine Deutsche Biographie (in German). Vol. Band 40. Leipzig: Duncker & Humblot. pp. 676–677.
- Textor von Haiger, Johann (1617). Nassauische Chronik (in German). Herborn: Christoph Raab.
- Vorsterman van Oyen, A.A. (1882). Het vorstenhuis Oranje-Nassau. Van de vroegste tijden tot heden (in Dutch). Leiden/Utrecht: A.W. Sijthoff/J.L. Beijers.

Wilhelmine Christine of Nassau-Siegen House of Nassau-Siegen (Protestant branch) Born: 1629 Died: 22 January 1700
Regnal titles
Appanage created for husband	Countess Consort of Waldeck-Wildungen; 1660 – 1669	Death of husband
