= Philip VII =

Philip VII may refer to:

- Philip III of Spain and VII of Burgundy, (1578–1621), King of Spain, Portugal and the Algarves
- Philip VII, Count of Waldeck (1613–1645)
- Philip VII, Comte de Paris (1838–1894), grandson and heir of Louis Philippe I, King of the French
