= John Casimir =

John Casimir may refer to:

- John Casimir (clarinetist) (1898–1963)
- John Casimir of the Palatinate-Simmern (1543–1592), Count Palatine of Lautern from 1576
- John Casimir, Count of Erbach-Breuberg (1584–1627)
- John Casimir, Count Palatine of Kleeburg (1589–1652), father of Karl X Gustav of Sweden
- John Casimir, Duke of Saxe-Coburg (1564–1633)
- John Casimir, Prince of Anhalt-Dessau (1596–1660), German prince of the House of Ascania
- John Casimir of Poland (1609–1672)
