= Josias II of Waldeck-Wildungen =

German count and general (1636–1669)

Josias II, Count of Waldeck-Wildungen
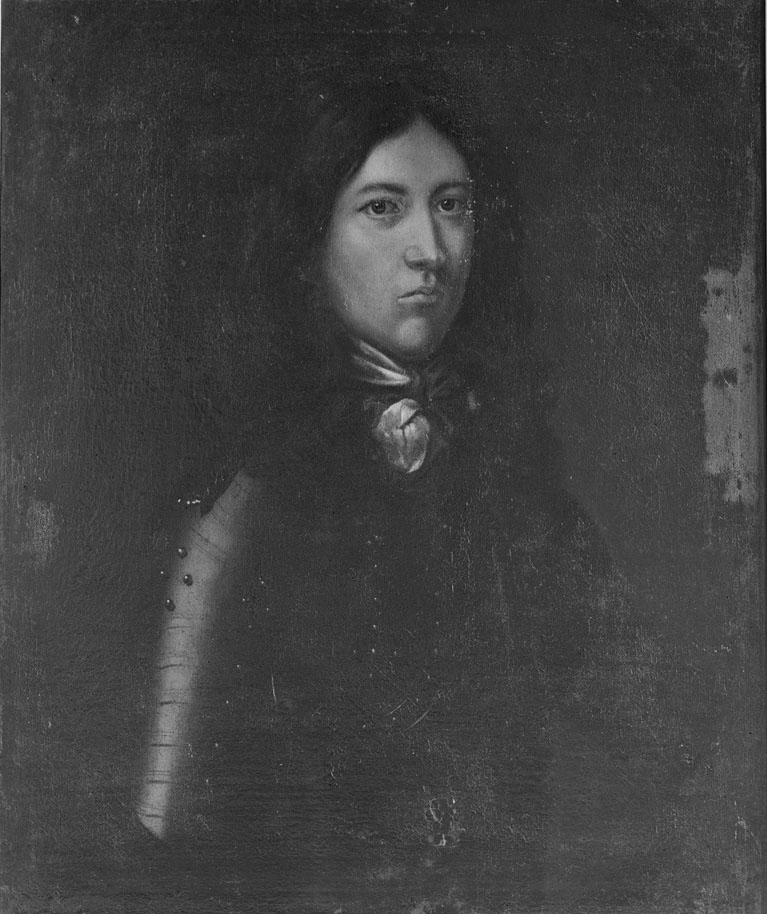
- Count Josias II of Waldeck-Wildungen. Anonymous portrait, c. 1655–1660. Bergheim Castle.

Count of Waldeck-Wildungen
- Coat of arms
- Reign: 1660–1669
- Predecessor: Christian Louis
- Successor: Christian Louis
- Full name: Josias II, Count of Waldeck-Wildungen
- Native name: Josias II. Graf von Waldeck-Wildungen
- Born: Josias Graf zu Waldeck und Pyrmont; 31 July 1636^{Jul.} Wildungen
- Died: 8 August 1669^{Greg.} Kandia
- Buried: St. Catherine's Church, Kandia; Evangelische Stadtkirche, Wildungen
- Noble family: House of Waldeck
- Spouse: Wilhelmine Christine of Nassau-Siegen
- Issue Detail: Charlotte Johanna, Duchess of Saxe-Saalfeld
- Father: Philip VII of Waldeck-Wildungen
- Mother: Anne Catherine of Sayn-Wittgenstein
- Occupation: Colonel in the infantry of Brandenburg 1655, major general 1656, Överste in the Swedish Army 1660, Generalfeldwachtmeister in the Imperial Army 1663, major general of the Brunswick-Lüneburg Army 1665

Count Josias II of Waldeck-Wildungen (31 July 1636^{Jul.} – 8 August 1669^{Greg.}), German: Josias II. Graf von Waldeck-Wildungen, official titles: Graf zu Waldeck und Pyrmont, Herr zu Tonna, was since 1660 Count of Waldeck-Wildungen. However, he was primarily a military man.

== Biography ==
Josias was born in Wildungen on 31 July 1636^{Jul.} (Note: Dek (1970), p. 88, Dek (1968), pp. 276 and 297, Hoffmeister (1883), p. 63 and Vorsterman van Oyen (1882), p. 117 mention the date 31 July 1636 without specification of the calendar they used.) as the second son of Count Philip VII of Waldeck-Wildungen and Countess Anne Catherine of Sayn-Wittgenstein. After his father's death in 1645, Christian Louis, Josias' eldest brother, succeeded him. Christian Louis was under the regency of his mother until 1660. In that year Josias was granted the district of Wildungen as an appanage, later also the districts of Wetterburg and Landau. (Note: The grant of the district of Landau must have been after the death of Josias' uncle Count John II of Waldeck-Landau, 10 October 1668.)

Josias was first in the service of Elector Frederick William of Brandenburg, under whom he was colonel of infantry in 1655 and fought as a major general in the Battle of Warsaw in 1656. (Note: According to Dek (1970), p. 88, Dek (1968), p. 297 and Hoffmeister (1883), p. 63 Josias was Rittmeister in the service of Brandenburg in 1656.) In 1660 he was Överste in Swedish service. In 1663 he took part in the Austro-Turkish War as imperial Generalfeldwachtmeister and was wounded by an arrow at Fünfkirchen.

In 1665, as major general, Josias took over the command of the Brunswick-Lüneburg armed forces – consisting of four regiments of cavalry, two regiments of infantry, some artillery and some guard companies – from Duke George William of Brunswick-Lüneburg. Subsequently, in 1668 George William transferred three infantry regiments to the Republic of Venice for the war on the island of Crete, whose capital Kandia was under heavy siege by the Turks. Josias was given the supreme command of these 3300 men and marched to Venice late in the autumn of that year. On 28 March 1669 he embarked and on 12 May he landed on the island. During the defence against the attacks of the besiegers, after having previously been wounded in the arm, he suffered another dangerous wound in the leg due to a shrapnel on 6/16 July. (Note: von Poten (1896), p. 677 mentions the date 6 July. Dek (1970), p. 88, Dek (1968), pp. 276 and 297 mention the date 16 July. Presumably, the former author calculated the date according to the Julian calendar and the latter according to the Gregorian calendar.) The prevailing heat and the state of mind, resulting from quarrels with the Commander-in-Chief, Captain General Morosini, aggravated his condition and on 8 August (Note: von Poten (1896), p. 677 mentions the date 29 July. Dek (1970), p. 88, Dek (1968), pp. 276 and 297, Hoffmeister (1883), p. 63 and Vorsterman van Oyen (1882), p. 117 mention the date 8 August. Presumably, the former author calculated the date according to the Julian calendar and the latter authors according to the Gregorian calendar.) around midnight he died in Kandia. His body was first buried in the St. Catherine's Church in Kandia and then moved to Wildungen. The tomb for Josias, made by Heinrich Papen in 1674, is in the Evangelische Stadtkirche in Bad Wildungen.

As his sons had already died, after Josias' death, the districts of Wildungen, Wetterburg and Landau came back into the possession of his brother Christian Louis.

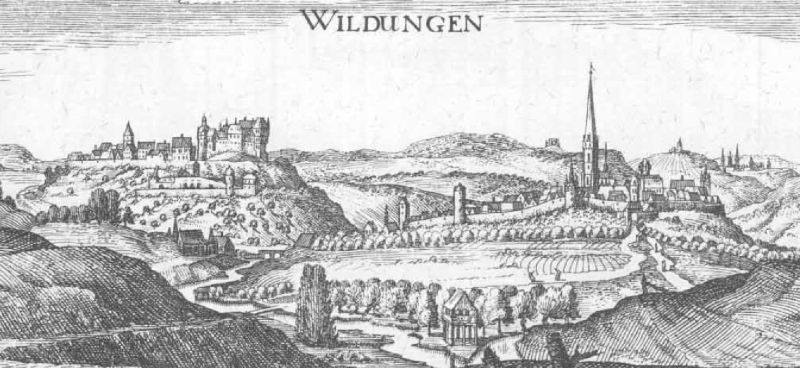
Wildungen in 1655. Engraving by Matthäus Merian.

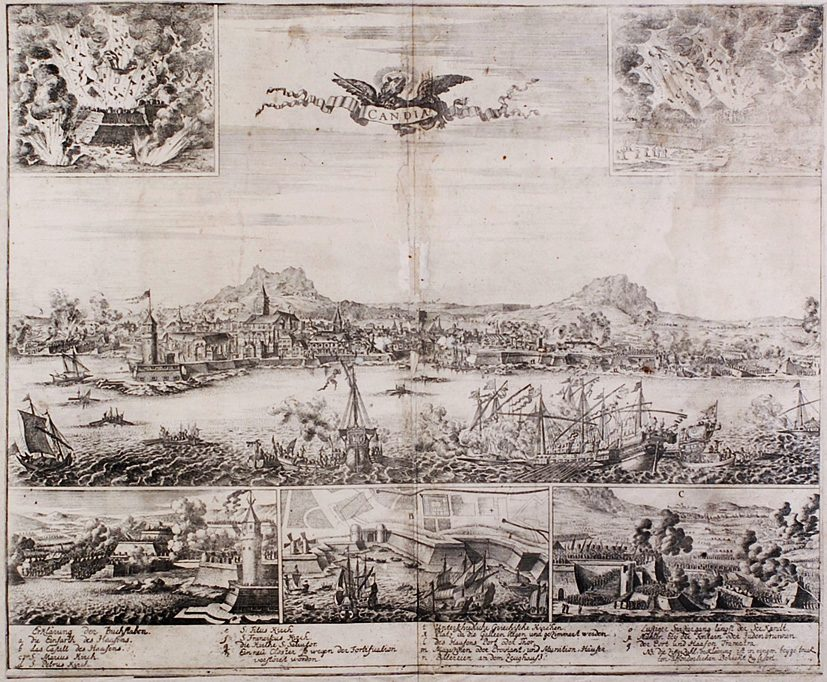
The Siege of Kandia. Anonymous engraving, 1669.

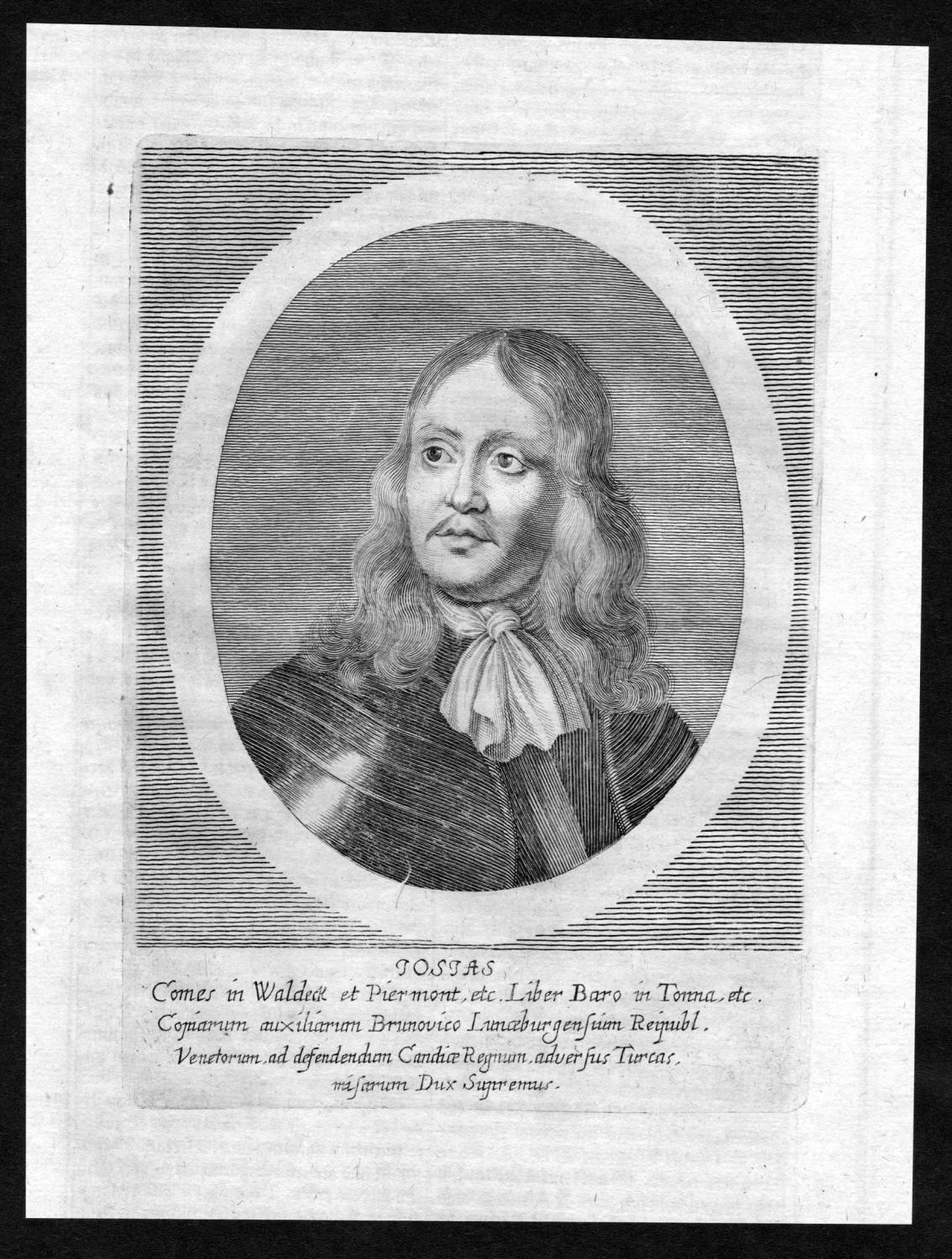
Count Josias II of Waldeck-Wildungen. Copper engraving by Matthäus Merian, 1680.

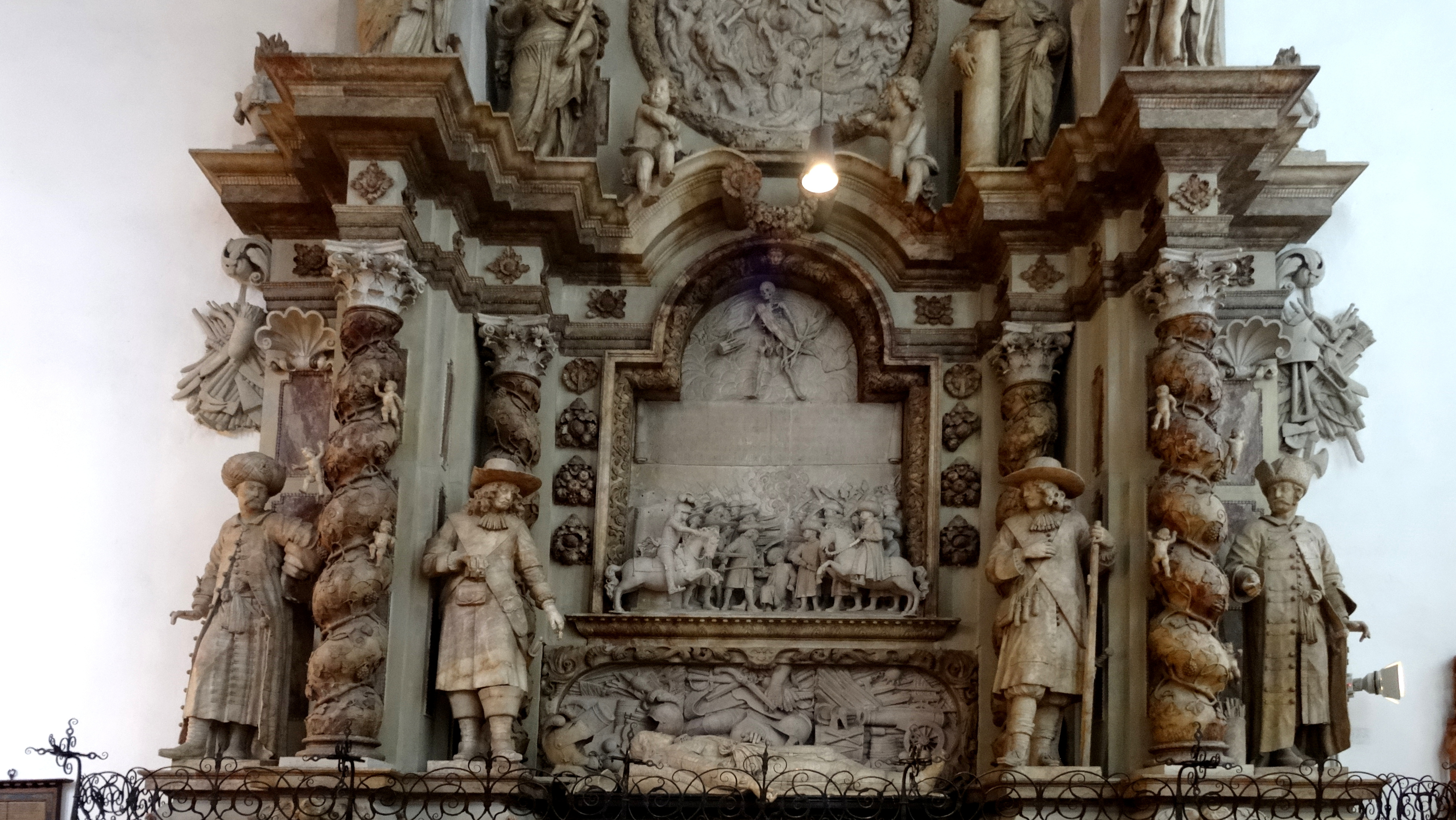
The tomb in the Evangelische Stadtkirche in Bad Wildungen. Photo: Friedhelm Dröge, 2018.

== Marriage and issue ==
Josias married at Arolsen Castle on 26 January 1660 (Note: "Dek (1970): married in Helsen, suburb of Arolsen 26-1-1660. This is a misinterpretation of the marriage certificate. One does indeed find in the Helsen parish records, the marriage certificate, but in this one it says: «1660 den 26 Januar ist der Hochgeborene Graff und Herr, Herr Josias Graff zu Waldeck u. Piermont … mit der Hochgebohrenen Gräfinnen Frewlein Wilhelmine Christina, Frewlein von Nassau, Catzenelnbogen, Vianden u. Diez, uff Arolsen abends umb 7 Uhren copulirt worden». One finds the date 26‑1‑1659 in Europäische Stammtafeln I, 117.") to Countess Wilhelmine Christine of Nassau-Siegen (1629 (Note: "She was certainly not born in 1625, as Europäische Stammtafeln claims. She was baptised in Heusden on 10-6-1629 and probably born there. However, it should be noted that William of Nassau-Siegen notified the birth of his daughter on 31-5-1629 from Ortheim (See: State Archives Wiesbaden 170^{III}).") – Hildburghausen, 22 January 1700 (Note: "Died on 21-1-1700 according to Europäische Stammtafeln I, 117; on 22-1-1707 according to Europäische Stammtafeln I, 139 and Hoffmeister (1883), confirmed by Dek (1970), with Saalfeld as place of death. But the death does not occur in the parish registers of Saalfeld, neither in January 1700 nor in January 1707. Saalfeld must be excluded as a possible place of death. Waldeckischer Helden – und Regenten – Saal, a manuscript written in 1737 by the Geheimrat August von Klettenburg and preserved in the State Archives Marburg, mentions that the Fürstin died at Cuylenborg in Holland on 21-1-1700. It is possible that she was mistaken for her sister-in-law Juliane Elisabeth, who was called «Gräfin Cülenborg» and died in 1707, which seems to be a cause of the mistake for some authors who, as we have seen, have the Fürstin die in that year. Finally, in the book Bau und Kunstdenkmäler, Kreis der Eder is claimed that she died in Altwillungen Castle. None of these claims are true. The death certificate can be found in the parish registry of Hildburghausen, Stadtkirche, part I, p. 475 R, year 1700: «Die Hochgeb. Gräfin u. Frau Wilhelmine Christina Verwittibte Gräfin zu Waldeck Wildungen, gebohrene Gräfin zu Nassau usw. wird aus diesem Hochfürstl. Residence Schlosse, den 22. January seelig Entschlafen, den 27, abendts umb 7 Uhr in Hochansehentlichen Leichenprocess von hier auf bis vors thor Begleithet, und so ferner auf Saaltfeld gebracht worden.»")), the youngest daughter of Count William of Nassau-Siegen and Countess Christiane of Erbach.

Josias and Wilhelmine Christine were closely related. Elisabeth of Nassau-Siegen, Josias' grandmother, was the eldest sister of Wilhelmine Christine's father. Also from his mother's side, Josias was related to Wilhelmine Christine. His great-grandmother, also named Elisabeth of Nassau-Siegen, was a younger sister of Count John VI 'the Elder' of Nassau-Siegen, the great-grandfather of Wilhelmine Christine. Agnes of Wied, the great-great-grandmother of Josias, was a daughter of yet another Elisabeth of Nassau-Siegen, a younger sister of Count William I 'the Rich' of Nassau-Siegen, who was also the great-great-grandfather of Wilhelmine Christine. Finally, both Wilhelmine Christine and Josias descended from Count Wolrad I of Waldeck-Waldeck, Wilhelmine Christine through her grandmother Magdalene of Waldeck-Wildungen.

From the marriage of Josias and Wilhelmine Christine, the following children were born:

1. Eleonore Louise (Arolsen Castle, 9 July 1661 – Arolsen Castle, 25 August 1661).
2. William Philip (Arolsen Castle, 27 September 1662 – Arolsen Castle, 29 December 1662).
3. Charlotte Dorothea (Arolsen Castle, 9 October 1663 – Arolsen Castle, 10 December 1664).
4. Charlotte Johanna (Arolsen Castle, 13 December 1664 – Hildburghausen, 1 February 1699), married in Maastricht on 2 December 1690 to Duke John Ernest of Saxe-Saalfeld (Gotha, 22 August 1658 – Saalfeld, 17 December 1729).
5. Sophie Wilhelmine (Arolsen Castle, 24 September 1666 – 13 February 1668).
6. Maximilian Frederick (Arolsen Castle, 25 April 1668 – Arolsen Castle, September 1668).
7. William Gustavus (Arolsen Castle, 25 April 1668 – Arolsen Castle, 21 May 1669).
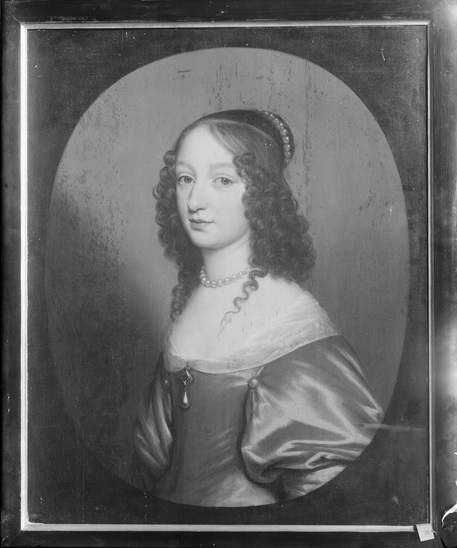
Wilhelmine Christine of Nassau-Siegen. Portrait by Gerard van Honthorst, ca. 1640. Foundation Historical Collections of the House of Orange-Nassau, The Hague.

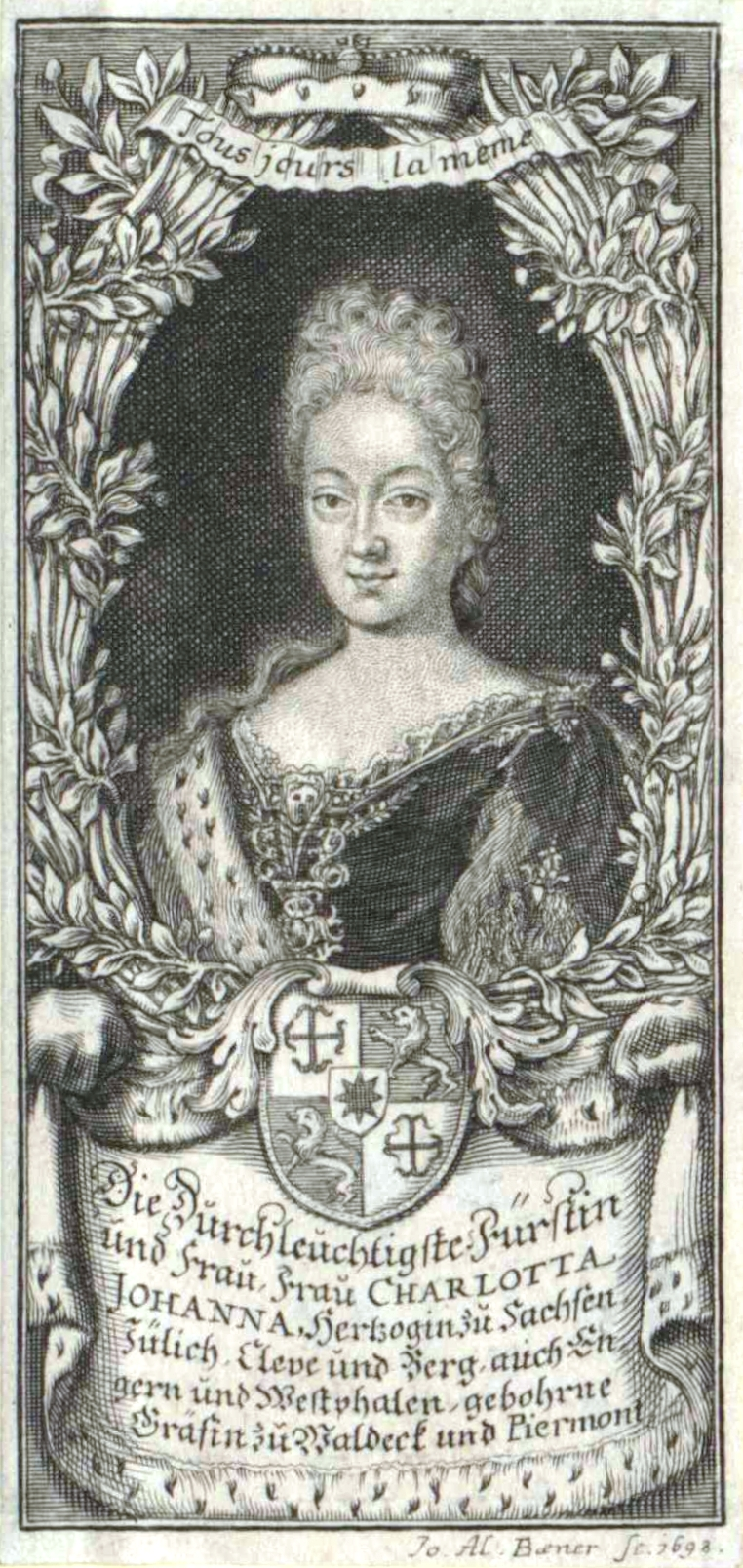
Charlotte Joanne of Waldeck-Wildungen. Engraving by Johann Alexander Böner, 1698. Bildarchiv Austria.

=== Known descendants ===
Josias has several known descendants. Among them are:

- the monarchs Victoria, Edward VII, George V, Edward VIII, George VI, Elizabeth II and Charles III of the United Kingdom,
- the kings Leopold I, Leopold II, Albert I, Leopold III, Baudouin I, Albert II and Philippe I of the Belgians.
- the tsars Ferdinand I, Boris III and Simeon II of Bulgaria.
- the kings Ferdinand II, Pedro V, Luís I, Carlos I and Manuel II of Portugal,
- Grand Duke Henri I of Luxembourg.

== Ancestors ==
Ancestors of Count Josias II of Waldeck-Wildungen
Great-great-grandparents	Wolrad II of Waldeck-Eisenberg (1509–1578) ⚭ 1546; Anastasia Günthera of Schwarzburg-Blankenburg (1526–1570)	Albrecht X of Barby and Mühlingen (1534–1588) ⚭ 1559; Mary of Anhalt-Zerbst (1538–1563)	John VI 'the Elder' of Nassau-Siegen (1536–1606) ⚭ 1559; Elisabeth of Leuchtenberg (1537–1579)	Philip IV of Waldeck-Wildungen (1493–1574) ⚭ 1554; Jutta of Isenburg-Grenzau (?–1564)	William I of Sayn-Wittgenstein (1488–1570) ⚭ 1522; Johannetta of Isenburg-Grenzau (1500–1563)	Frederick Magnus I of Solms-Laubach (1521–1561) ⚭ 1545; Agnes of Wied (1521–1588)	Philip of Solms-Braunfels (1494–1581) ⚭ 1534; Anne of Tecklenburg (1500–1554)	William I 'the Rich' of Nassau-Siegen (1487–1559) ⚭ 1531; Juliane of Stolberg-Wernigerode (1506–1580)
Great-grandparents	Josias I of Waldeck-Eisenberg (1554–1588) ⚭ 1582; Mary of Barby and Mühlingen (1563–1619)		John VII 'the Middle' of Nassau-Siegen (1561–1623) ⚭ 1581; Magdalene of Waldeck-Wildungen (1558–1599)		Louis I of Sayn-Wittgenstein (1532–1605) ⚭ 1567; Elisabeth of Solms-Laubach (1549–1599)		Konrad of Solms-Braunfels (1540–1592) ⚭ 1559; Elisabeth of Nassau-Siegen (1542–1603)	
Grandparents	Christian of Waldeck-Wildungen (1585–1637) ⚭ 1604; Elisabeth of Nassau-Siegen (1584–1661)				Louis II of Sayn-Wittgenstein (1571–1634) ⚭ 1598; Elisabeth Juliane of Solms-Braunfels (1578–1634)			
Parents	Philip VII of Waldeck-Wildungen (1613–1645) ⚭ 1634; Anne Catherine of Sayn-Wittgenstein (1610–1690)							

== Sources ==
- Bastiaensen, Jean (1999). Prins Filip & Prinses Mathilde. Twee families met geschiedenis (in Dutch). Leuven: Uitgeverij Van Halewyck. ISBN 90-5617-262-X.
- Behr, Kamill (1854). Genealogie der in Europa regierenden Fürstenhäuser (in German). Leipzig: Verlag von Bernhard Tauchnitz.
- Dek, A.W.E. (1962). Graf Johann der Mittlere von Nassau-Siegen und seine 25 Kinder (in German). Rijswijk: Krips Repro.
- Dek, A.W.E. (1968). "De afstammelingen van Juliana van Stolberg tot aan het jaar van de Vrede van Münster". Spiegel der Historie. Maandblad voor de geschiedenis der Nederlanden (in Dutch). 1968 (7/8): 228–303.
- Dek, A.W.E. (1970). Genealogie van het Vorstenhuis Nassau (in Dutch). Zaltbommel: Europese Bibliotheek.
- von Ehrenkrook, Hans Friedrich; Förster, Karl & Marchtaler, Kurt Erhard (1928). Ahnenreihen aus allen deutschen Gauen. Beilage zum Archiv für Sippenforschung und allen verwandten Gebieten (in German). Görlitz: Verlag für Sippenforschung und Wappenkunde C.A. Starke.
- Haarmann, Torsten (2014). Das Haus Waldeck und Pyrmont. Mehr als 900 Jahre Gesamtgeschichte mit Stammfolge. Deutsche Fürstenhäuser (in German). Vol. Heft 35. Werl: Börde-Verlag. ISBN 978-3-981-4458-2-4.
- Hoffmeister, Jacob Christoph Carl (1883). Historisch-genealogisches Handbuch über alle Grafen und Fürsten von Waldeck und Pyrmont seit 1228 (in German). Cassel: Verlag Gustav Klaunig.
- Huberty, Michel; Giraud, Alain & Magdelaine, F. & B. (1976). l'Allemagne Dynastique (in French). Vol. Tome I: Hesse-Reuss-Saxe. Le Perreux: Alain Giraud.
- Huberty, Michel; Giraud, Alain & Magdelaine, F. & B. (1981). l'Allemagne Dynastique (in French). Vol. Tome III: Brunswick-Nassau-Schwarzbourg. Le Perreux: Alain Giraud.
- Huberty, Michel; Giraud, Alain & Magdelaine, F. & B. (1987). l'Allemagne Dynastique (in French). Vol. Tome V: Hohenzollern-Waldeck-Familles alliées A-B. Le Perreux-sur-Marne: Alain Giraud.
- Menk, Gerhard (1992). Georg Friedrich von Waldeck 1620–1692. Eine biographische Skizze. Waldeckische Historische Hefte (in German). Vol. Band 3. Arolsen: Waldeckischer Geschichtsverein e.V. ISBN 3-9802226-5-9.
- von Poten, Bernhard (1896). "Waldeck, Josias Graf". Allgemeine Deutsche Biographie (in German). Vol. Band 40. Leipzig: Duncker & Humblot. pp. 676–677.
- Vorsterman van Oyen, A.A. (1882). Het vorstenhuis Oranje-Nassau. Van de vroegste tijden tot heden (in Dutch). Leiden/Utrecht: A.W. Sijthoff/J.L. Beijers.
