= Philip VII of Waldeck-Wildungen =

German count (1613–1645)

Philip VII, Count of Waldeck-Wildungen
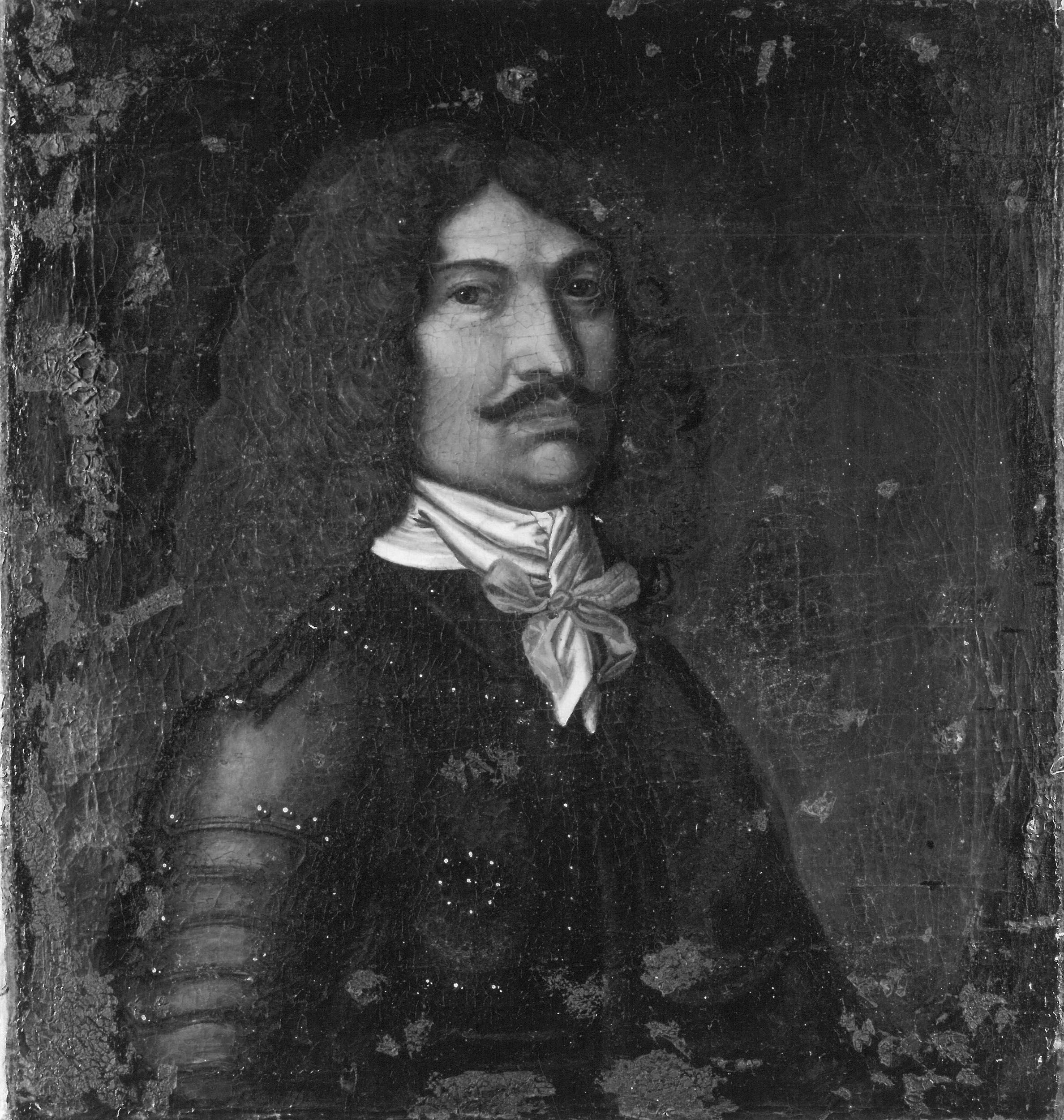
- Count Philip VII of Waldeck-Wildungen.

Count of Waldeck-Wildungen
- Coat of arms
- Reign: 1638–1645
- Predecessor: Christian
- Successor: Christian Louis
- Full name: Philip VII, Count of Waldeck-Wildungen
- Native name: Philipp VII. Graf von Waldeck-Wildungen
- Born: 25 November 1613; Eisenberg Castle
- Died: 24 February 1645 (aged 31); Jankowitz, Bohemia
- Noble family: House of Waldeck
- Spouse: Anne Catherine of Sayn-Wittgenstein
- Issue Detail: Christian Louis; Josias II; Juliane Elisabeth
- Father: Christian of Waldeck-Wildungen
- Mother: Elisabeth of Nassau-Siegen
- Occupation: Colonel in the Imperial Army 1643

Count Philip VII of Waldeck-Wildungen (25 November 1613 – 24 February 1645), German: Philip VII. Graf von Waldeck-Wildungen, official titles: Graf zu Waldeck und Pyrmont, Herr zu Tonna, was since 1638 Count of Waldeck-Wildungen.

== Biography ==
Philip was born at Eisenberg Castle (Note: Dek (1968), pp. 260 and 275 mentions born in Wildungen.) on 25 November 1613 as the second son of Count Christian of Waldeck-Wildungen and his wife Countess Elisabeth of Nassau-Siegen. As the eldest surviving son Philip succeeded his father early 1638, while his younger brother John II became Count of Waldeck-Landau. The County of Waldeck-Wildungen, like the entire County of Waldeck, was heavily in debt. The financial difficulties of the county did not change when the counts of Waldeck acquired the Lordship of Tonna in 1640. The lordship was sold to Duke Frederick I of Saxe-Gotha-Altenburg in 1677.

An important and, as it turned out, fatal event during Philip's reign was the time when Swedish troops were encamped in Wildungen. The commander-in-chief, Johan Banér, had marched to the city in August 1640 with about 70,000 men, while not far from there the imperial troops under Archduke Leopold William and Ottavio Piccolomini were encamped in Fritzlar. No battle took place. But the soldiers used the city's supplies and destroyed the villages in the surrounding countryside. On 15 September Banér marched away again.

Annoyed beyond measure by the damage the Swedes had inflicted on his county, Philip changed sides and took the side of Emperor Ferdinand III in 1643. The Emperor appointed him a colonel and put him in charge of a cavalry regiment called 'Waldeck'.

On 24 February 1645, at the Battle of Jankov in Bohemia, where the Bavarian and imperial troops were defeated by the Swedish general Lennart Torstenson, the 31-year-old Philip was taken prisoner and – against the law of war – executed. Philip was succeeded by his eldest son Christian Louis, who was under the regency of his mother until 1660.

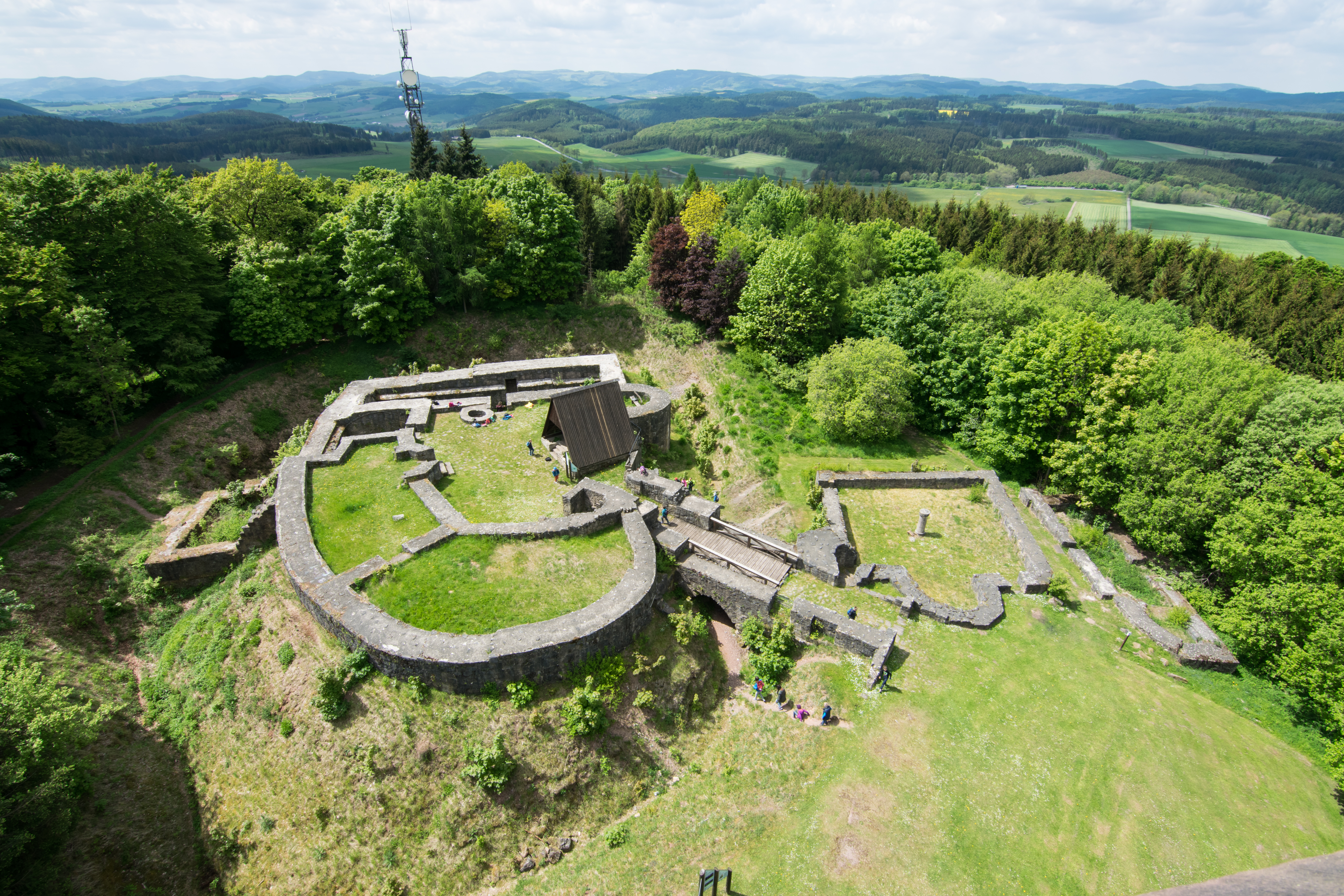
The ruins of Eisenberg Castle, 2015.

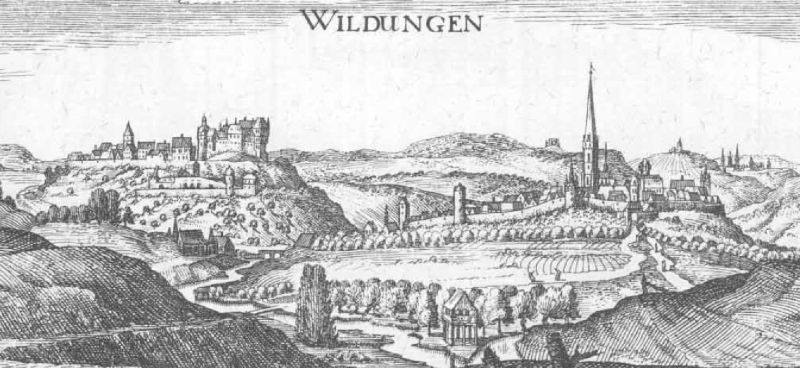
Wildungen in 1655. Engraving by Matthäus Merian.

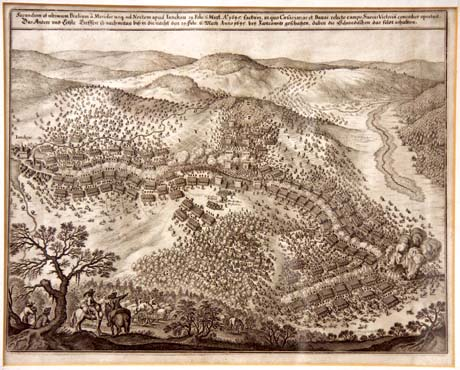
Copper engraving of the Battle of Jankov.

== Marriage and issue ==
Philip married in Frankfurt on 26 October 1634 to Countess Anne Catherine of Sayn-Wittgenstein (Simmern, 27 July 1610 – Kleinern, December 1690 (Note: Haarmann (2014), p. 48 mentions died on 1 December 1650 (sic). Dek (1968), pp. 260 and 275 mentions died in Kleinern, December 1690. Hoffmeister (1883), p. 61 mentions died in December 1690.)), daughter of Count Louis II of Sayn-Wittgenstein and Countess Elisabeth Juliane of Solms-Braunfels.

From this marriage the following children worn born:

1. Count Christian Louis (Waldeck, 29 July 1635 – Landau, 12 December 1706), succeeded his father as Count of Waldeck-Wildungen in 1645. Married:
  1. on 2 July 1658 to Countess Anne Elisabeth of Rappoltstein (Rappoltstein, 7 March 1644 – Landau, 6 December 1678).
  2. in Idstein on 6 June 1680^{Jul.} (Note: "We are sure that the parish records of Idstein do not mention the marriage. Yet (see 130^{II} 1146 in State Archives Wiesbaden) the contract was signed on 6‑6‑1680, the date shown by all printed works and the death certificate in the Landau registers as the date of marriage. The same place of marriage is indeed not in doubt: just consult in the State Archives Wiesbaden (130^{II} 1159) the document entitled "Verzeichnis was beÿ hochgräfl. Beyläger zu Itzstein vom Sambstag d. 5bris donnerstag d. 10t. Junÿ bey Küchen und Kellern, wie auch sonsten ufgegangen, Itzten den 12t. Junÿ ao. 1680". It is therefore perfectly acceptable that the wedding was celebrated on 6‑6, the document quoted above even allowing that it was the old style. Die Heiligen römischen Reichs vollständiger genealogisch u. schematischer Kalender, Frankfurt am Main: Varrentrap (1756), wrongly situates the marriage in 1678." Haarmann (2014), p. 49, Dek (1970), p. 47, Dek (1968), p. 297, Hoffmeister (1883), p. 66 and Vorsterman van Oyen (1882), p. 75 mention the date 6 June 1680 without mentioning which calendar they used.) to Countess Johannette of Nassau-Idstein (Idstein, 14 September 1657 – Landau, 14 March 1733).
2. Count Josias II (Wildungen, 31 July 1636^{Jul.} – Kandia, 8 August 1669^{Greg.} (Note: von Poten (1896), p. 677 mentions the date 29 July. Dek (1970), p. 88, Dek (1968), pp. 276 and 297, Hoffmeister (1883), p. 63 and Vorsterman van Oyen (1882), p. 117 mention the date 8 August. Presumably, the former author calculated the date according to the Julian calendar and the latter authors according to the Gregorian calendar.)), obtained the Wildungen district as an appanage in 1660. He married at Arolsen Castle on 26 January 1660 (Note: "Dek (1970): married in Helsen, suburb of Arolsen 26-1-1660. This is a misinterpretation of the marriage certificate. One does indeed find in the Helsen parish records, the marriage certificate, but in this one it says: «1660 den 26 Januar ist der Hochgeborene Graff und Herr, Herr Josias Graff zu Waldeck u. Piermont … mit der Hochgebohrenen Gräfinnen Frewlein Wilhelmine Christina, Frewlein von Nassau, Catzenelnbogen, Vianden u. Diez, uff Arolsen abends umb 7 Uhren copulirt worden». One finds the date 26‑1‑1659 in Europäische Stammtafeln I, 117.") to Countess Wilhelmine Christine of Nassau-Siegen (1629 (Note: "She was certainly not born in 1625, as Europäische Stammtafeln claims. She was baptised in Heusden on 10-6-1629 and probably born there. However, it should be noted that William of Nassau-Siegen notified the birth of his daughter on 31-5-1629 from Ortheim (See: State Archives Wiesbaden 170^{III}).") – Hildburghausen, 22 January 1700 (Note: "Died on 21-1-1700 according to Europäische Stammtafeln I, 117; on 22-1-1707 according to Europäische Stammtafeln I, 139 and Hoffmeister (1883), confirmed by Dek (1970), with Saalfeld as place of death. But the death does not occur in the parish registers of Saalfeld, neither in January 1700 nor in January 1707. Saalfeld must be excluded as a possible place of death. Waldeckischer Helden – und Regenten – Saal, a manuscript written in 1737 by the Geheimrat August von Klettenburg and preserved in the State Archives Marburg, mentions that the Fürstin died at Cuylenborg in Holland on 21-1-1700. It is possible that she was mistaken for her sister-in-law Juliane Elisabeth, who was called «Gräfin Cülenborg» and died in 1707, which seems to be a cause of the mistake for some authors who, as we have seen, have the Fürstin die in that year. Finally, in the book Bau und Kunstdenkmäler, Kreis der Eder is claimed that she died in Altwillungen Castle. None of these claims are true. The death certificate can be found in the parish registry of Hildburghausen, Stadtkirche, part I, p. 475 R, year 1700: «Die Hochgeb. Gräfin u. Frau Wilhelmine Christina Verwittibte Gräfin zu Waldeck Wildungen, gebohrene Gräfin zu Nassau usw. wird aus diesem Hochfürstl. Residence Schlosse, den 22. January seelig Entschlafen, den 27, abendts umb 7 Uhr in Hochansehentlichen Leichenprocess von hier auf bis vors thor Begleithet, und so ferner auf Saaltfeld gebracht worden.»")).
3. Juliane Elisabeth (1 August 1637 – Reinhardshausen, 20 May 1707), married at Arolsen Castle on 27 January 1660 to Count Henry Wolrad of Waldeck-Eisenberg (Culemborg, 28 March 1642 – Graz, 15 July 1664).
4. Anne Sophie (Waldeck, 1 January 1639 – 3 October 1646).
5. Johanna (Waldeck, 30 September 1639 – Waldeck, 2 October 1639).
6. Philippine (19 November 1643 – 3 August 1644).

== Ancestors ==
Ancestors of Count Philip VII of Waldeck-Wildungen
Great-great-grandparents	Philip III of Waldeck-Eisenberg (1486–1539) ⚭ 1503; Adelaide of Hoya (1475–1513)	Henry XXXII of Schwarzburg-Blankenburg (1499–1538) ⚭ 1524; Catherine of Henneberg-Schleusingen (1508–1567)	Wolfgang of Barby and Mühlingen (1502–1564) ⚭ 1526; Agnes of Mansfeld-Hinterort (1511–1558)	John II of Anhalt-Zerbst (1504–1551) ⚭ 1534; Margaret of Brandenburg (1511–1577)	William I 'the Rich' of Nassau-Siegen (1487–1559) ⚭ 1531; Juliane of Stolberg-Wernigerode (1506–1580)	George III of Leuchtenberg (1502–1555) ⚭ 1528; Barbara of Brandenburg-Ansbach (1495–1552)	Henry VIII of Waldeck-Wildungen (1465–1513) ⚭ before 1492; Anastasia of Runkel (?–1502/03)	Salentin VII of Isenburg-Grenzau (before 1470–1534) ⚭ Elisabeth of Hunolstein-Neumagen (ca. 1475–1536/38)
Great-grandparents	Wolrad II of Waldeck-Eisenberg (1509–1578) ⚭ 1546; Anastasia Günthera of Schwarzburg-Blankenburg (1526–1570)		Albrecht X of Barby and Mühlingen (1534–1588) ⚭ 1559; Mary of Anhalt-Zerbst (1538–1563)		John VI 'the Elder' of Nassau-Siegen (1536–1606) ⚭ 1559; Elisabeth of Leuchtenberg (1537–1579)		Philip IV of Waldeck-Wildungen (1493–1574) ⚭ 1554; Jutta of Isenburg-Grenzau (?–1564)	
Grandparents	Josias I of Waldeck-Eisenberg (1554–1588) ⚭ 1582; Mary of Barby and Mühlingen (1563–1619)				John VII 'the Middle' of Nassau-Siegen (1561–1623) ⚭ 1581; Magdalene of Waldeck-Wildungen (1558–1599)			
Parents	Christian of Waldeck-Wildungen (1585–1637) ⚭ 1604; Elisabeth of Nassau-Siegen (1584–1661)							

== Sources ==
- Behr, Kamill (1854). Genealogie der in Europa regierenden Fürstenhäuser (in German). Leipzig: Verlag von Bernhard Tauchnitz.
- Dek, A.W.E. (1968). "De afstammelingen van Juliana van Stolberg tot aan het jaar van de Vrede van Münster". Spiegel der Historie. Maandblad voor de geschiedenis der Nederlanden (in Dutch). 1968 (7/8): 228–303.
- Dek, A.W.E. (1970). Genealogie van het Vorstenhuis Nassau (in Dutch). Zaltbommel: Europese Bibliotheek.
- von Ehrenkrook, Hans Friedrich; Förster, Karl & Marchtaler, Kurt Erhard (1928). Ahnenreihen aus allen deutschen Gauen. Beilage zum Archiv für Sippenforschung und allen verwandten Gebieten (in German). Görlitz: Verlag für Sippenforschung und Wappenkunde C.A. Starke.
- Haarmann, Torsten (2014). Das Haus Waldeck und Pyrmont. Mehr als 900 Jahre Gesamtgeschichte mit Stammfolge. Deutsche Fürstenhäuser (in German). Vol. Heft 35. Werl: Börde-Verlag. ISBN 978-3-981-4458-2-4.
- Hoffmeister, Jacob Christoph Carl (1883). Historisch-genealogisches Handbuch über alle Grafen und Fürsten von Waldeck und Pyrmont seit 1228 (in German). Cassel: Verlag Gustav Klaunig.
- Huberty, Michel; Giraud, Alain & Magdelaine, F. & B. (1981). l'Allemagne Dynastique (in French). Vol. Tome III: Brunswick-Nassau-Schwarzbourg. Le Perreux: Alain Giraud.
- Huberty, Michel; Giraud, Alain & Magdelaine, F. & B. (1987). l'Allemagne Dynastique (in French). Vol. Tome V: Hohenzollern-Waldeck-Familles alliées A-B. Le Perreux-sur-Marne: Alain Giraud.
- Vorsterman van Oyen, A.A. (1882). Het vorstenhuis Oranje-Nassau. Van de vroegste tijden tot heden (in Dutch). Leiden/Utrecht: A.W. Sijthoff/J.L. Beijers.
- von Wurzbach, Constant (1885). "Philipp Graf Waldeck". Biographisches Lexikon des Kaiserthums Oesterreich, enthaltend die Lebenskizzen der denkwürdigen Personen, welche seit 1750 in de österreichischen Kronländern geboren wurden oder darin gelebt und gewirkt haben (in German). Vol. Zweiundfünfzigster Theil. Wien: Verlag der k.k. Hof- und Staatsdruckerei. p. 174.

Philip VII of Waldeck-Wildungen House of Waldeck Born: 25 November 1613 Died: 24 February 1645
Preceded by Christian	Count of Waldeck-Wildungen; 31 December 1637 – 24 February 1645	Succeeded by Christian Louis
Preceded by Christian of Waldeck-Wildungen	Count of Pyrmont; 31 December 1637 – 24 February 1645	Succeeded by Christian Louis of Waldeck-Wildungen
Preceded by Christian of Waldeck-Wildungen	Lord of Tonna; 1640 – 24 February 1645	Succeeded by Christian Louis of Waldeck-Wildungen
