= John Casimir, Count of Erbach-Breuberg =

German Count and member of the House of Erbach

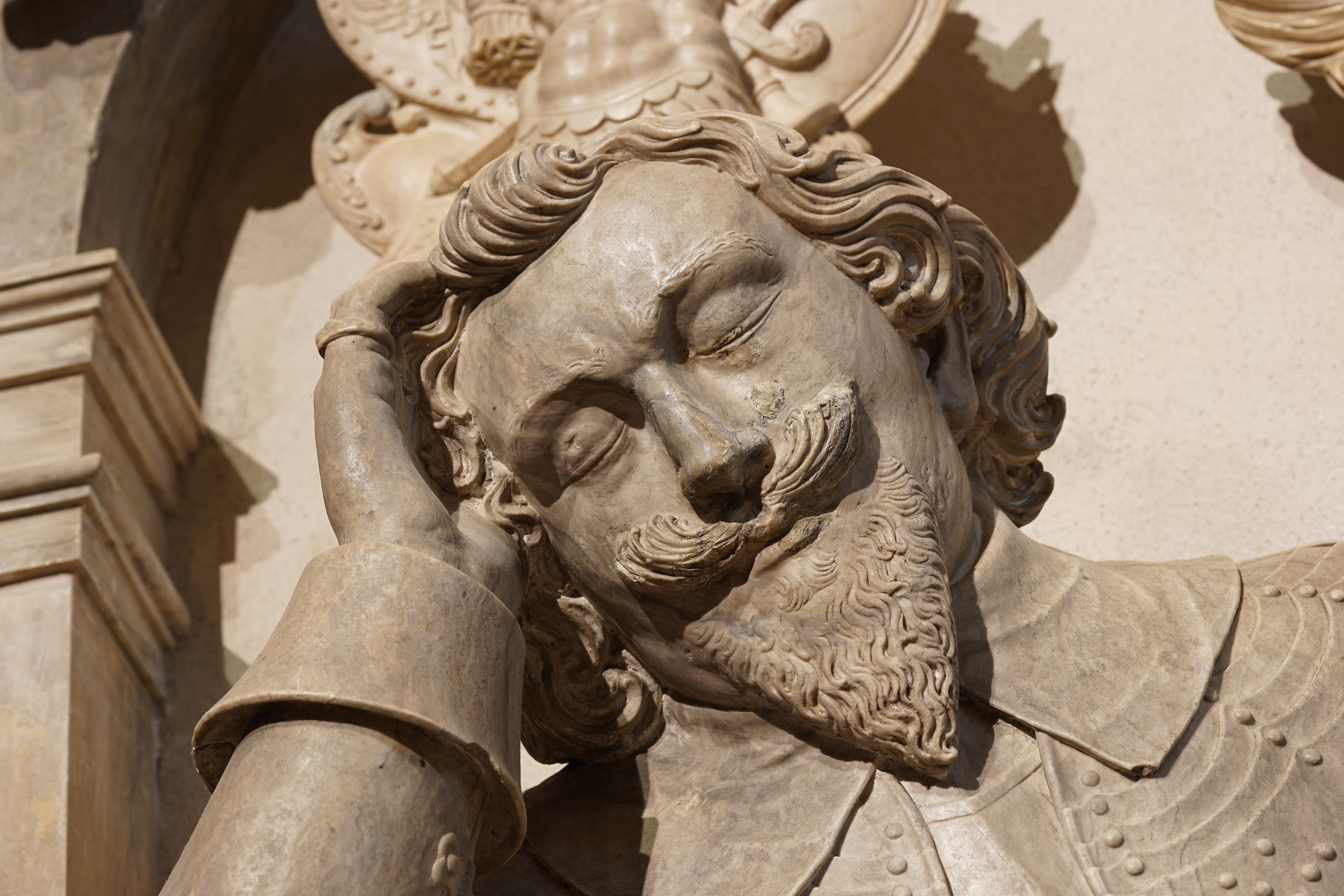
Epitaph of Johann Casimir, Count of Erbach-Breuberg

John Casimir, Count of Erbach-Breuberg (10 August 1584 – 14 January 1627), was a German Count, member of the House of Erbach and ruler over Breuberg, Wildenstein and Fürstenau.

== Biography ==
Born in Erbach, he was the eleventh child and fourth (but third surviving) son of George III, Count of Erbach-Breuberg by his second wife, Countess Anna of Solms-Laubach (11 April 1557 – 8 December 1586), the youngest child and daughter of Frederick Magnus, Count of Solms-Laubach-Sonnenwalde and his wife, Countess Agnes of Wied (d. 1588). John Casimir never married, nor had any known children.

== Erbach domains ==
After the death of their father, John Casimir and his surviving brothers divided the Erbach domains in 1606: he received the districts of Breuberg and Wildenstein. In 1623, after the death of his eldest brother Frederick Magnus without surviving issue, the remaining brothers divided his domains: John Casimir received the district of Fürstenau.

== Death ==
John Casimir died in Schweidnitz aged 41 and was buried in Michelstadt. Because he never married or had children, his brothers divided his land after his death.
