= George III, Count of Erbach-Breuberg =

Count of Erbach-Breuberg (1548–1605)

George III, Count of Erbach
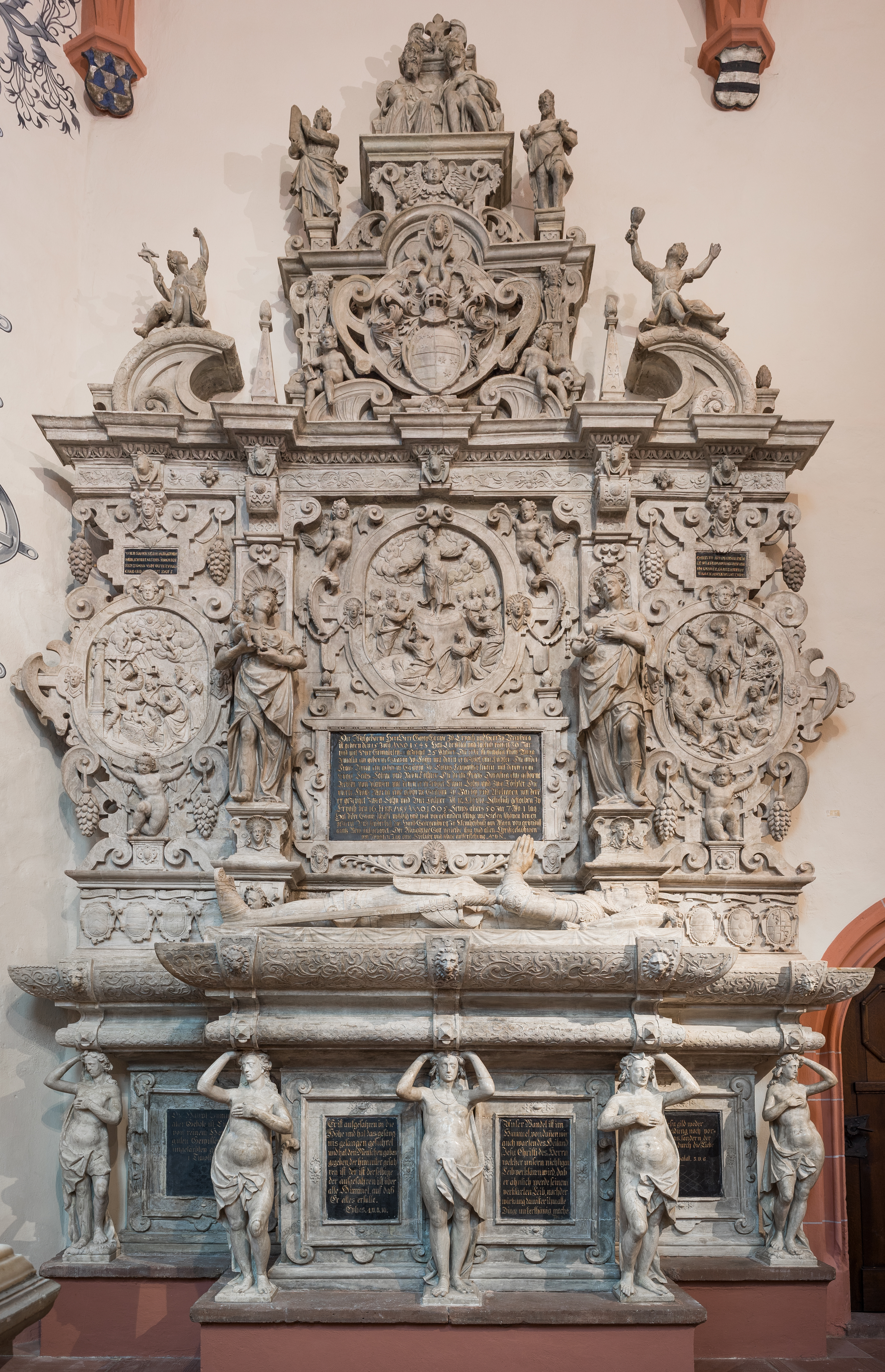
- Epitaph of George III, Count of Erbach-Breuberg
- Born: 15 July 1548; Erbach
- Died: 26 February 1605 (aged 56); Erbach
- Buried: City Church in Michelstadt
- Noble family: House of Erbach
- Spouses: Anna Amalie of Sayn-Wittgenstein; Anna of Solms-Laubach; Dorothea of Reuss-Obergreiz; Maria of Barby-Mühlingen
- Father: Eberhard XII, Count of Erbach-Freienstein
- Mother: Margareta of Salm-Dhaun

George III, Count of Erbach (15 July 1548 – 26 February 1605), was Count of Erbach in Lauterbach and Breuberg.

== Early life and ancestry ==
Born in Erbach, he was the fifth and youngest child but only son of Eberhard XII, Count of Erbach-Freienstein and his wife, Countess Margareta of Salm-Dhaun (1521-1576), a daughter of Count Philipp of Salm, Wild- and Rhinegrave of Dhaun (1492-1521). Through his mother, Countess Margareta, he had Portuguese, French, and Moorish (possibly African) ancestors (see Family below).

== Life ==
Around 1560, the Elector Palatine enfeoffed George III (jointly with his father and his uncle Valentin II, Count of Erbach-Schönberg) with the district of Wildenstein.

After the death of his uncle George II, Count of Erbach-Reichenberg in 1569, George III reunited all the Erbach family possessions. Among the properties that he inherited was noted Reichenberg Castle, which he converted into a Renaissance-style fortress.

Between 1588 and 1590, he expanded Fürstenau Castle, which became the seat of his Erbach state government.

George III died in Erbach aged 56 and was buried in the Stadtkirche of Michelstadt, where in 1678 a family tomb for the Counts of Erbach would be constructed.

After his death, his sons divided the territory:

- Frederick Magnus (1575–1618) inherited Fürstenau and Reichenberg.
- John Casimir (1584–1627) inherited Breuberg and Wildenstein.
- Louis I (1579–1643) inherited parts of Erbach and Freienstein.
- George Albert I (1597–1647), inherited Schönberg and Seeheim.

== Erbach domains ==
After Frederick Magnus died without surviving male issue, in 1623 his brothers divided his share among themselves: John Casimir received Fürstenau, Louis received Michelstadt and Bad König, and George Albert received Reichenberg.

When John Casimir died unmarried in 1627, Louis received Wildenstein and George Albert received Fürstenau. When Louis died in 1643 without surviving male issue, George Albert inherited his possessions, thereby reuniting the Erbach possessions once again.

== Personal life ==
On 27 July 1567, George III married, firstly, Countess Anna Amalie of Sayn-Wittgenstein (c. 1551 – 13 July 1571), a daughter of Count Johann IX of Sayn-Wittgenstein (d. 1560) and his wife, Countess Margarethe von Henneberg-Schleusingen (1508-1546). This marriage remained childless.

On 15 July 1572, George III married, secondly, Anna of Solms-Laubach (11 April 1557 – 8 December 1586), a daughter of Frederick Magnus, Count of Solms-Laubach-Sonnenwalde and his wife, Countess Agnes of Wied (d. 1588). They had twelve children.

In Greiz on 11 November 1587, George III married, thirdly, Countess Dorothea Reuss of Greiz-Obergreiz (28 October 1566 – 26 October 1591), a daughter of Count Heinrich XV Reuss of Greiz-Obergreiz (1521-1561) and his wife, Countess Marie Salome of Oettingen (1535-1603). They had three children.

In Korbach on 2 August 1592, George III married, fourthly, Maria of Barby-Mühlingen (1563-1619), widow of Count Josias I of Waldeck-Eisenberg, a daughter of Count Albert X of Barby-Mühlingen (1534-1588)(8 April 1563 – 29 December 1619) and his wife, Princess Maria of Anhalt-Zerbst (1 December 1538 – 25 April 1563), herself a daughter of John V, Prince of Anhalt-Zerbst and his wife, Margaret of Brandenburg, Duchess of Pomerania. They had six children. Through their son, George Albert I, Count of Erbach-Schönberg, George III was the great-great-great grandfather of Queen Charlotte of Mecklenburg-Strelitz, and through her, the ancestor of dozens of European royals.

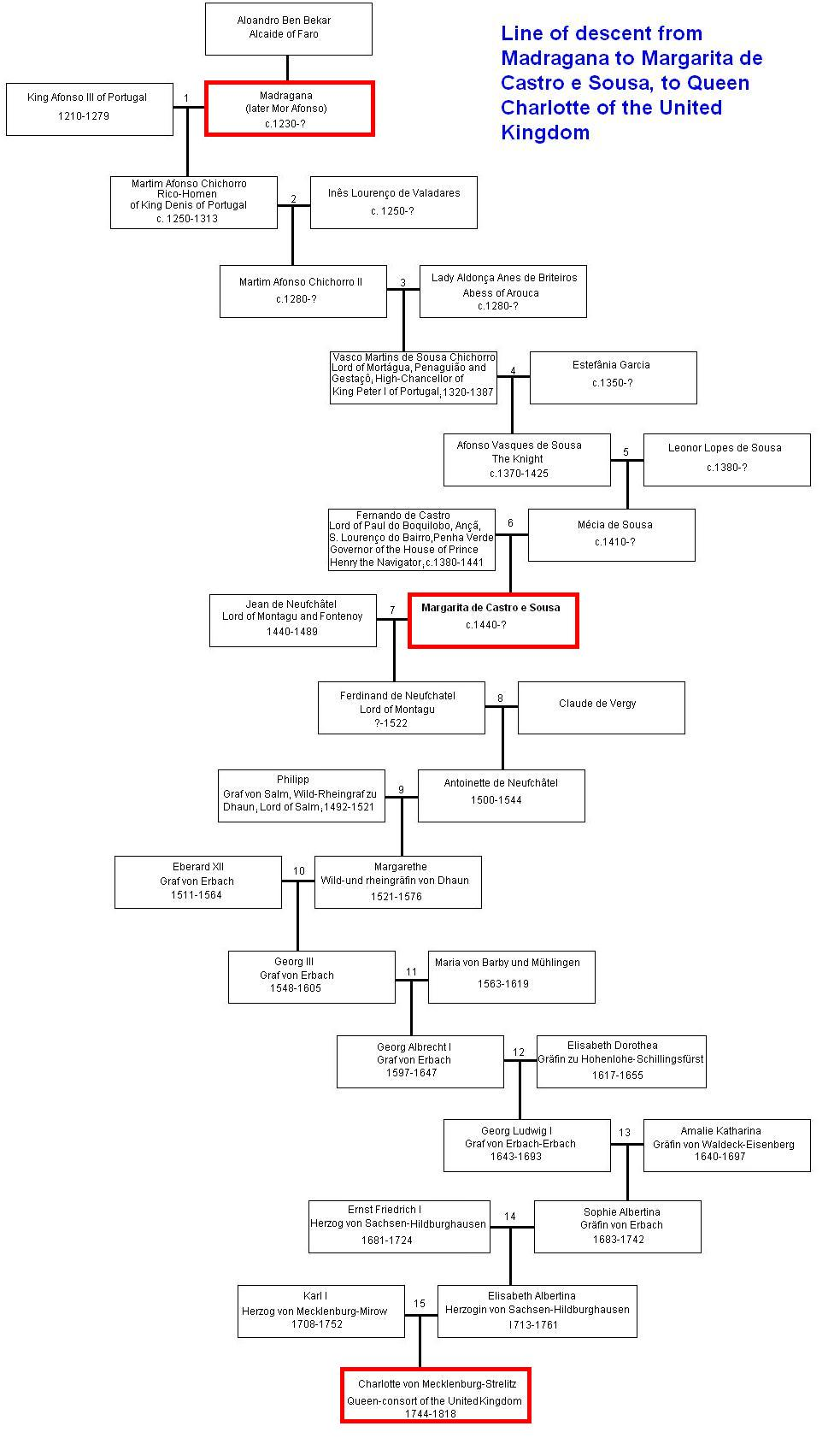
One of three lines of descent between Charlotte, Margarita de Castro e Sousa, and Madragana. This portion of Charlotte's ancestry has often been used to justify claims that she was of African descent.
