= Europäische Stammtafeln =

Book series

Europäische Stammtafeln — German for European Family Trees — is a series of twenty-nine books which contain sets of genealogical tables of the most influential families of Medieval European history. It is a standard reference work for those researching medieval imperial, royal, and noble families of Europe.

A reference to this work is usually to the third series. A fourth series, identified as Neue Folge, was being written by Rev. Detlev Schwennicke who was the sole author who started at volume 17 and is currently being published Frankfurt am Main, by Verlag Vittorio Klostermann. Twenty-nine volumes are available. Detlev Schwennicke died on 24 December 2012.

== History ==
The preceding 16 volumes of the third series of the Europäische Stammtafeln (edited by Detlev Schwennicke) were derivative works, building upon the contributions of:

- the first series edited by Wilhelm Karl, Prinz zu Isenburg (1903–1956). He published the first volume in 1935 and the second before the start of the Second World War. After the war plans and outlines were drawn up for further volumes but due to illness he did not complete them.
- the second series by Frank, Baron Freytag von Loringhoven (1910–1977) was a revision and continuation of Isenburg's work. The first volume was published in 1953 with a further three volumes followed before his death in 1977.
- a sixth volume — an edited edition of Loringhoven's first volume, was published 1978 as Schwennicke's first volume.

Between 1978 and 1995 Schwennicke edited another nine volumes up completing the 16 volume third series. A full citation to the third series is:

- Schwennicke, Detlev (1978–1995), Europäische Stammtafeln: Stammtafeln zur Geschichte der Europäischen Staaten, Neue Folge ("European Family Trees: Family Trees for the History of European States, New Series"), Marburg, Germany: J. A. Stargardt

== Volume names ==
Current volume names of the Europäische Stammtafeln - Neue Folge = European family trees - new series.

- 1/1: Die fränkischen Könige und die Könige und Kaiser, Stammesherzoge und Kurfürsten, Markgrafen und Herzoge des Heiligen Römischen Reiches Deutscher Nation = The Frankish Kings and the Kings and Emperors, Original Dukes and Electors, Margraves and Dukes of the Holy Roman Empire of the German Nation
- 1/2: Przemysliden, Askanier, Herzoge von Lothringen, die Häuser Hessen, Württemberg und Zähringen = Przemyslids, Askanians, Dukes of Lorraine, the Houses of Hesse, Württemberg, and Zähringen.
- 1/3: Die Häuser Oldenburg, Mecklenburg, Schwarzburg, Waldeck, Lippe und Reuß = The houses of Oldenburg, Mecklenburg, Schwarzburg, Waldeck, Lippe and Reuss
- 3/3: Andere große europäische Familien. Illegitime Nachkommen spanischer und portugiesischer Königshäuser = Other great European families. Illegitimate descendants of Spanish and Portuguese royal houses
- 3/4: Das feudale Frankreich und sein Einfluß auf die Welt des Mittelalters = Feudal France and its influence on the world of the Middle Ages
- 3/5: Seitenverwandte der Rurikiden = Collateral Relatives of the Rurikids
- 5: Standesherrliche Häuser II = Mediatised Houses II
- 9: Familien des Früh- und Hochkapitalismus = Families of early and high capitalism
- 10: Pairs de France und ihre Familien = Peers of France and their families
- 11: Familien vom Mittel- und Oberrhein und aus Burgund = Families of the middle and upper Rhine and from Burgundy
- 12: Familien des alten Herzogtums Schwaben = Families of the ancient Duchy of Swabia
- 13: Les familles féodales de France I = The families of feudal France I
- 14: Les familles féodales de France II = The families of feudal France II
- 15: La Bourgogne au Moyen Age = Burgundy in the Middle Ages
- 16: Bayern und Franken = Bavaria and Franconia
- 17: Hessen und das Stammesherzogtum Sachsen = Hessen and the stem duchy of Saxony
- 18: Zwischen Maas und Rhein 1 = Between the Meuse and Rhine 1
  - Note: The Meuse is a major European river, rising in France and flowing through Belgium and the Netherlands before draining into the North Sea. The Rhine runs from the Swiss canton of Grisons in the southeastern Swiss Alps through Germany and eventually flows into the North Sea coast in the Netherlands.
- 19: Zwischen Weser und Oder = Between the Weser and the Oder
  - Note: The Weser is formed at Hannoversch Münden by the confluence of the rivers Fulda and Werra flowing through Lower Saxony, then reaching Bremen before emptying 50 km further north at Bremerhaven into the North Sea. The Oder rises in the Czech Republic and flows (generally north- and northwest-ward) through western Poland, later forming 187 kilometres (116 mi) of the border between Poland and Germany, part of the Oder-Neisse line. The river ultimately flows into the Szczecin Lagoon north of Szczecin and then into three branches (the Dziwna, Świna and Peene) that empty into the Gulf of Pomerania of the Baltic Sea.
- 20: Brandenburg und Preußen 1 = Brandenburg and Prussia 1
- 21: Brandenburg und Preußen 2 = Brandenburg and Prussia 2
- 22: Rund um die Ostsee 1 = Around the Baltic Sea 1
- 23: Rund um die Ostsee 2 = Around the Baltic Sea 2
- 24: Rund um die Ostsee 3 = Around the Baltic Sea 3
- 25: Rund um die Ostsee 4 = Around the Baltic Sea 4
- 26: Zwischen Maas und Rhein 2 = Between the Meuse and the Rhine 2 (river areas)
- 27: Zwischen Maas und Rhein 3 = Between the Meuse and the Rhine 3 (river areas)
- 28: Zwischen Maas und Rhein 4 = Between the Meuse and the Rhine 4 (river areas)
- 29: Zwischen Maas und Rhein 5 = Between the Meuse and the Rhine 5 (river areas)

== See also ==
- Europäische Stammtafeln volumes published by Vittorio Klostermann
- Europäische Stammtafeln: Legend and Advice - Abbreviations by John P. DuLong, Ph.D.
