= Otto IV of Waldeck =

Otto IV, Count of Waldeck
- Born: c. 1440
- Died: 14 October 1494; Wetterburg Castle in Arolsen
- Buried: Monastery at Volkhardinghausen (now part of Bad Arolsen)
- Noble family: House of Waldeck
- Spouses: Matilda of Neuenahr; Elisabeth of Tecklenburg
- Father: Otto III, Count of Waldeck
- Mother: Anna of Oldenburg

Otto IV, Count of Waldeck at Landau (c. 1440 – 14 October 1494 at Wetterburg Castle in Arolsen) was the third and last ruling count of the elder Waldeck-Landau line. He was the grandson of Count Adolph III (d. 1431), who had founded the elder Waldeck-Landau line in 1387 and was the third and only surviving son of Count Otto III (d. 1458 or 1459) and his wife Anna of Oldenburg. His elder brothers John and Henry had died unmarried and childless in 1431 and 1438 respectively.

== Life ==
Otto resided at Landau Castle in the town of Landau, which is now part of Arolsen. During his reign, he fought a number of armend conflicts. He supported Landgrave Louis II of Hesse during his punitive campaigns against the Hanseatic city of Einbeck in 1461 and 1479 and against the city of Volkmarsen in 1476. From 1464 to 1461, Otto fought on the side of Hesse in the Hesse-Paderborn Feud against bishop Simon III of Paderborn. In 1469, the bishop's brother Bernard VII of Lippe invaded Waldeck.

In 1474, a new conflict with Simon III erupted. Troops from Padernborn had devastated Waldeck and in retaliation, Otto took the town of Lichtenau, looted it and took a number of prisoners. Simon III again called in the help of his brother Bernard VII, who marched into Waldeck and besieged the town of Mengeringhausen. Noblemen in Bernard's camp included Count John I of Rietberg and Counts of Hoya, Schaumburg and Diepholz. Otto marched his army to Mengeringhausen to relieve the town. However, his cousin Wolrad I visited Bernard VII in the enemy camp and negotiated a settlement. The siege was lifted and the feud ended.

In the same year 1475, Otto IV found himself in a feud against John I of Rietberg and his allies, who invaded Waldeck and captured the small town of Rhoden (now part of Diemelstadt) and took away prisoners and cattle. Otto IV allied himself with the town of Korbach and on Whit Monday 1476, he attacked Erwitte and neighbouring villages and returned home with considerable spoils.

In 1482, Otto IV fought a feud against John, Gottschalk and Henry of Harthausen and the Westpahlian allies, and a separate feud against Stephen of Malsburg. In 1484, he fought a feud against Philip of Urff and Eberhard Schenk of Schweinsberg.

Otto IV reformed the monasteries in his territories to stop their moral decay:

- Between 1461 and 1469, he pushed through a fundamental reform of the monastery at Volkhardinghausen. In 1465, he handed it to the Canons Regular and affiliated it to the Congregation of Windesheim. Canons Regular moved in from Möllenbeck Abbey, which had been reformed itself shortly before. Under their leadership, the monastery experienced a new heyday.
- In 1487, Otto IV and his relatives Philip II and Henry VI invited, with papal approval, Franciscan Observants to establish a new monastery at Korbach.
- In 1492, he gave Aroldessen Abbey to Hospital Brothers of St. Anthony in Grünberg, which led to a rapid growth of the abbey.

== Death ==
Otto IV died on 14 October 1495 at Wetterburg Castle in Arolsen. He was buried in the chapel of the monastery at Volkhardinghausen (now part of Bad Arolsen). Since he had no sons, the elder Waldeck-Landau line died out with his death. Waldeck-Landau was divided between the two surviving lines, Philip II of Waldeck-Waldeck and Henry VIII of Waldeck-Wildungen. Moreover, Otto had put out money, with Schöneburg Castle and the district of Hofgeismar as securities. If this mortgage was repaid, the money would go to Philip II and he was then required by Otto's will to use it to redeem the mortgage on the village of Ehringen (now part of Volkmarsen).

In his will, Otto IV bequeathed 100 gold guilders to the monastery in Volkhardinghausen, another 100 gold guilders for the construction of a church in the monastery at Korbach, 25 guilders to his Chancellor, Volmar Lösten, 300 guilder to his illegitimate son Arndt and 80 guilders to Arndt's mother, Anna of Hohenfeld. His widow, Elisabeth, received Wetterburg Castle as her widow seat.

== Marriage and issue ==
On 17 January 1464, Otto married Matilda of Neuenahr. However, she died the following year.

In 1465, he married his second wife, Elisabeth of Tecklenburg (d. 1499). With her, he had a daughter Eva (1466–1489), who was engaged to Bernard of Lippe, but died of the plague before she could marry. Eva was interred in Aroldessen Abbey.

Otto IV had an illegitimate son, Arndt, with Anna of Hohenfeld. In his will, he bequeathed Arndt 300 gold guilders.

== Footnotes ==
Otto IV of Waldeck House of Waldeck Born: c. 1440 Died: 14 October 1495
Preceded by Otto III	Count of Waldeck-Landau; 1459-1495	Succeeded by Philip II as Count of Waldeck-Waldeck
Preceded by Otto III	Count of Waldeck-Landau; 1459-1495	Succeeded by Henry VIII as Count of Waldeck-Wildungen
