= Principality of Waldeck and Pyrmont =

Principality in the Holy Roman Empire and Germany

Principality of Waldeck and Pyrmont Fürstentum Waldeck und Pyrmont
- 1180–1918
- Top: Flag (before 1830); Bottom: Flag (after 1830) Coat of arms
- Anthem: "Mein Waldeck"
- Waldeck (red) within the German Empire. The small northern territory is Pyrmont while the southern lands are Waldeck.

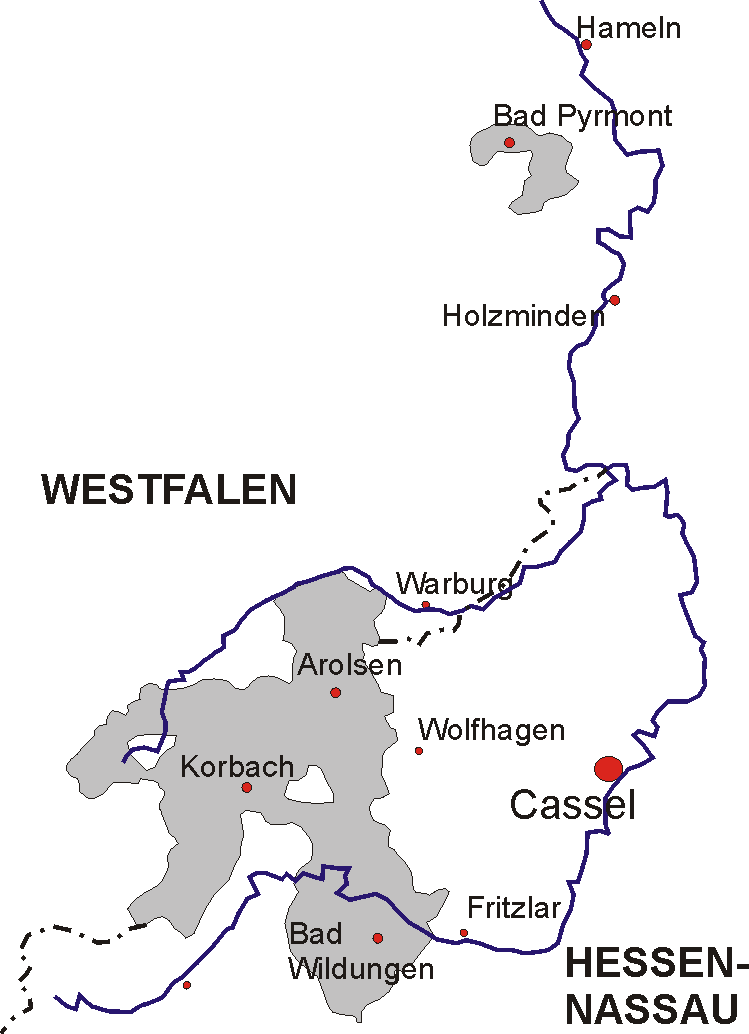
- Map of Waldeck, showing the border between Westphalia and Hesse-Nassau 1712–1921
- Status: State of the Holy Roman Empire; State of the Confederation of the Rhine; State of the German Confederation; State of the North German Confederation; State of the German Empire
- Capital: Waldeck (to 1655); Arolsen (from 1655); 51°22′N 9°1′E
- Common languages: German
- Religion: United Protestant: Evangelical State Church of Waldeck and Pyrmont
- Prince
  - 1712–1728: Friedrich Anton Ulrich (first)
  - 1893–1918: Friedrich (last)
- Historical era: Middle Ages
  - Established as a County: 1180
  - Became Reichsgraf (immediate count): 1349
  - Succeeded to Pyrmont: 1625
  - Raised to Imp. Principality: January 1712
  - Administered by Prussia: 1868
  - German Revolution: 1918
  - Subsumed into Prussia: 1929

Population
  - 1848: 56,000
Preceded by	Succeeded by
County of Schwalenberg; County of Pyrmont	Free State of Waldeck-Pyrmont
- Today part of: Germany

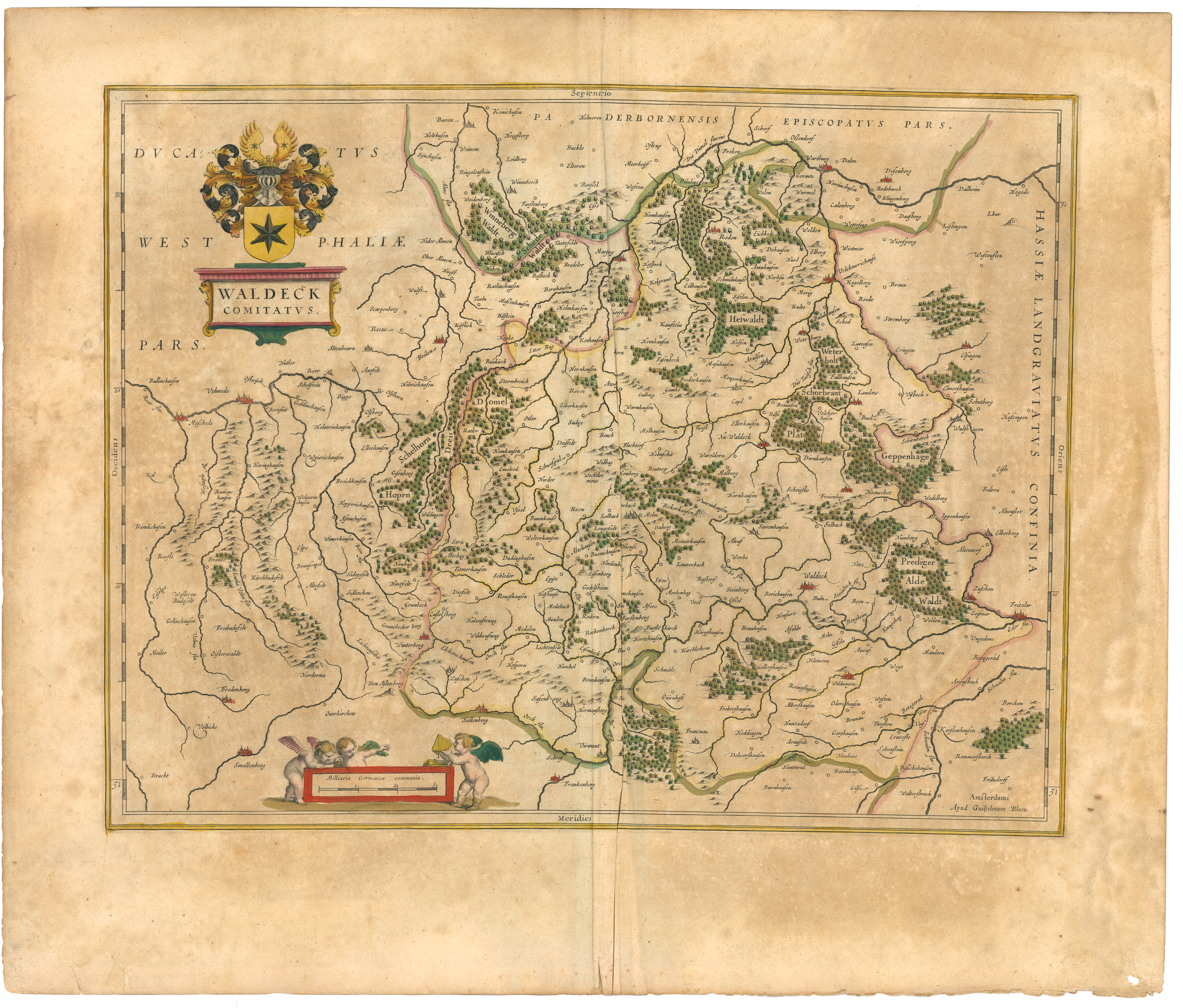
County of Waldeck in 1645

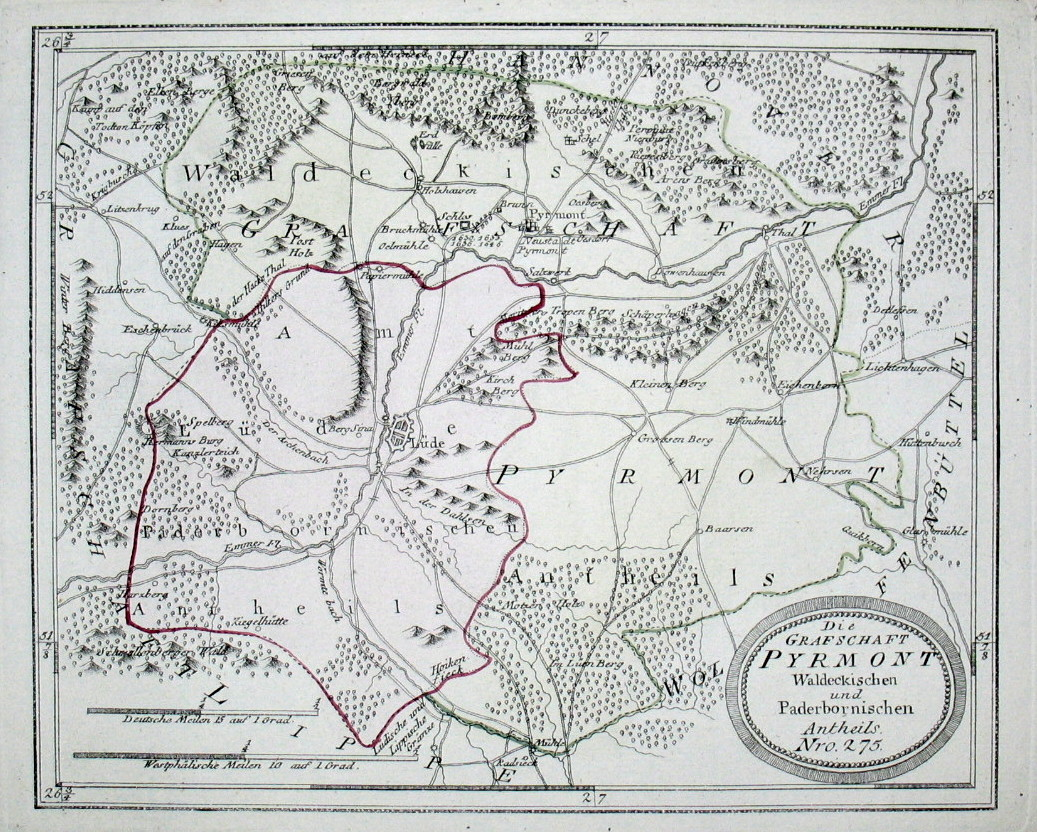
County of Pyrmont Waldeck and Paderborn portion (1794)

The County of Waldeck (later the Principality of Waldeck and Principality of Waldeck and Pyrmont) was a state of the Holy Roman Empire and its successors from the late 12th century until 1929. In 1349 the county gained Imperial immediacy and in 1712 was raised to the rank of principality. After the dissolution of the Holy Roman Empire in 1806 it was a constituent state of its successors: the Confederation of the Rhine, the German Confederation, the North German Confederation, and the German Empire. After the abolition of the monarchy in 1918, the renamed Free State of Waldeck-Pyrmont became a component of the Weimar Republic until divided between Hannover and other Prussian provinces in 1929. It comprised territories in present-day Hesse and Lower Saxony (Germany).

== History ==
Coat of arms of the counts of Waldeck (1349–1712)

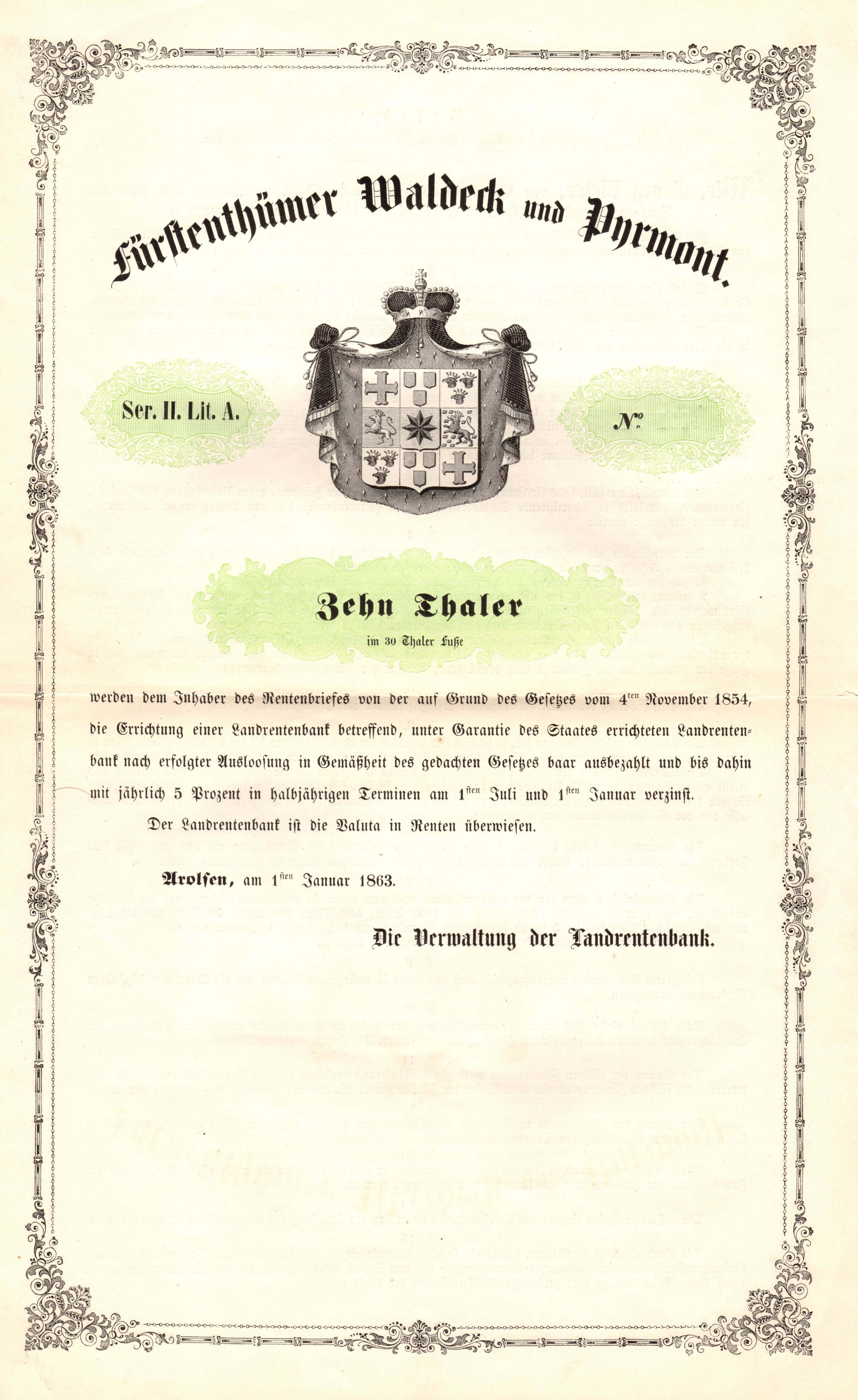
Government bond of the Principality Waldeck and Pyrmont, issued 1 January 1863

The noble family of the Counts of Waldeck and the later Princes of Waldeck and Pyrmont were male line descendants of the Counts of Schwalenberg (based at Schwalenberg Castle), ultimately descendent from Widekind I of Schwalenberg (reigned 1127–1136/7). Waldeck Castle, overlooking the Eder river at Waldeck, was first attested in 1120. A branch of the family was named after the castle in 1180, when Volkwin II of Schwalenberg acquired the castle through his marriage with Luitgard, daughter of Count Poppo I of Reichenbach and Hollende, who was heiress of Waldeck. Over time, the family built up a small lordship in modern day North Hesse.

=== County of Waldeck ===
Initially, Waldeck was a fief of the Electorate of Mainz. In 1379, it became the County of Reichslehen. After the death of Count Henry VI in 1397, the family split into two lines: the senior Landau line founded by Adolph III and the junior Waldeck line founded by Henry VII, which sometimes feuded with one another. The two lines came under the sovereignty of the Landgraviate of Hesse in 1431 and 1438 respectively, due to financial difficulties and the final victory of the Landgraviate over Mainz in 1427, which led to the transfer of the County of Ziegenhain to Hesse. The Landgraves levied tribute on the Counts of Waldeck in exchange for forgiving their debts to them and taking on all their debts to others.

After the death of Henry VIII in 1486, the Waldeck line split once more, into the Waldeck-Wildungen and Waldeck-Eisenberg lines. The senior Landau line ended with the death of Otto IV in 1495 and its possessions passed to the Wildungen and Eisenberg lines. In 1526 and 1529, Philip IV of Waldeck-Wildungen and Philip III of Waldeck-Eisenberg converted their respective principalities to Lutheranism. Several partitions led to the creation of further lines, but these were reunited by the new Wildung line in 1692.

In 1626, the family also inherited the County of Pyrmont and thereafter called themselves "Counts of Waldeck and Pyrmont." The two counties of Waldeck and Pyrmont were physically separated and were not united into a single legal entity until the 19th century.

In 1639, Count Philip Dietrich of Waldeck from the new Eisenberg line, inherited the County of Culemborg in Gelderland along with the counties of Werth (Isselburg) in Münsterland, Pallandt, and Wittem. The Lordship of Tonna in Thüringen, a fief of the Dukes of Saxe-Altenburg was inherited by Waldeck-Pyrmont in 1640, but sold to Duke Frederick I of Saxe-Gotha-Altenburg in 1677. Waldeck remained the main residence of the county until 1655, when the residence was shifted from Waldeck to Arolsen. Philip Dietrich was succeeded in 1664 by his brother Count George Frederick, whose full title was "Count and Lord of Waldeck, Pyrmont, and Cuylenburg, Lord of Tonna, Paland, Wittem, Werth." In 1682, he was promoted by Emperor Leopold I to the status of "Prince of Waldeck", with Imperial immediacy. His four sons all predeceased him, so on 12 June 1685, he made a contract with his cousin, Christian Louis of the new Wildung line, to transfer the whole Waldeck patrimony to him and for it to be inherited by primogeniture thereafter. This agreement was confirmed by Emperor Leopold in 1697. After George Frederick's death in 1692, Christian Louis became the sole ruler of the entire principality.

The County of Cuylenburg and the Lordship of Werth were lost in 1714, owing to the marriage of George Frederick's second daughter, Sophia Henriette (1662-1702) to Ernest of Saxe-Hildburghausen.

=== Principality of Waldeck (1712–1848) ===
On 6 January 1712, Frederick Anthony Ulrich of Waldeck and Pyrmont was elevated to prince by Emperor Charles VI. During the American War of Independence from 1775 to 1783, Prince Frederick Carl Augustus provided a single battalion sized regiment to the British for the war in America in exchange for payment. A total of 1,225 Waldeck soldiers fought in America.

The principality was caught up in the Napoleonic Wars and in 1807 it joined the Confederation of the Rhine, but not the Napoleonic Kingdom of Westphalia. Waldeck was required to guarantee equal rights of worship to its Catholic citizens and supply 400 soldiers in case of a campaign. For a brief period, from 1806 until 1812, Pyrmont was a separate principality as a result of the partition of the territory between the brothers Frederick and George, but the territories were reunited after Frederick's death.

The independence of the principality was confirmed in 1815 by the Congress of Vienna, and Waldeck and Pyrmont became a member of the German Confederation. In 1832 it joined the Zollverein. In 1847, on Prussian initiative, the sovereignty of Hesse-Kassel over Waldeck (and Schaumburg-Lippe) was finally revoked by the Federal Convention of the Confederation. This had been the case de facto since Waldeck joined the Confederation of the Rhine in 1807, but the ruling meant that Hesse-Kassel lost the right to claim the territory in escheat.

=== Principality of Waldeck-Pyrmont (1849–1918) ===
Since 1645, Waldeck had been in a personal union with the County (later Principality) of Pyrmont. Beginning in 1813, the prince strove to unite the two territories legally into the Principality of Waldeck-Pyrmont. However, political opposition meant that this did not take place until 1849. Even after the unification, Pyrmont retained its own tiny Landtag for budgetary matters until 1863/64. In 1849–1850, Waldeck was divided into three districts: the District of the Eder, the of Eisenberg and the District of the Twiste.

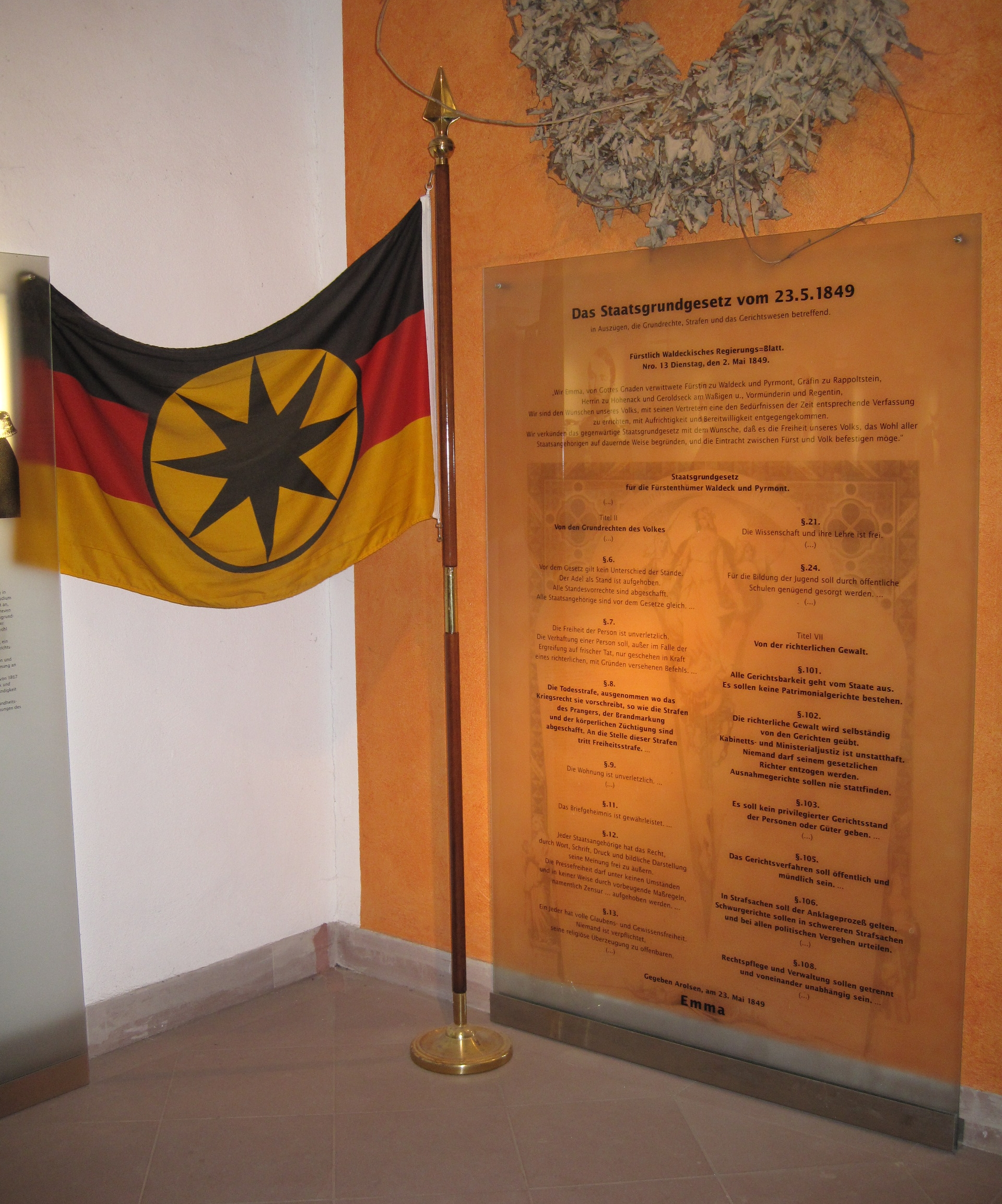
Fundamental law of the Principality of Waldeck and Pyrmont, 23 May 1849 (excerpts)

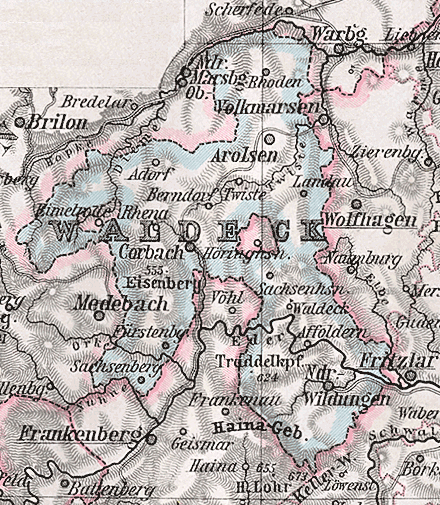
Waldeck in 1905

On 1 August 1862, Waldeck-Pyrmont concluded a military convention with Prussia. As a result, Waldeck-Pyrmont fought on the Prussian side in the Austro-Prussian War of 1866 and thus avoided annexation at the war's end – unlike the neighbouring Electorate of Hesse. However, the small, cash-strapped principality could not afford to pay its contributions to the new North German Confederation, so the principality's Landtag unanimously voted to reject the North German Constitution in order to pressure the prince into signing an accession treaty with Prussia. Bismarck had previously ruled out unification with Prussia on grounds of prestige. Therefore, under the treaty that Waldeck-Pyrmont and Prussia signed in October 1867, the principality remained nominally independent and retained its legislative sovereignty, but from 1 January 1868 Prussian took control of the principality's state deficit, internal administration, judiciary, and schools. Thereafter, Prussia appointed a State Director formally with the agreement of the prince. Appellate jurisdiction for Waldeck was exercised by the Prussian state court (Landgericht) in Kassel and for Pyrmont by the state court in Hannover. The prince retained control over the administration of the church, the prerogative of mercy, and the right of veto over new laws. He also continued to receive the income from his domains. Prussian administration served to reduce administrative costs for the small state and was based on a ten-year contract that was repeatedly renewed for the duration of its existence. The situation continued in 1871, when the principality became a constituent state of the new German Empire. In 1905, Waldeck and Pyrmont had an area of 1121 km^{2} and a population of 59,000.

The princely house of Waldeck and Pyrmont is closely related to the royal family of the Netherlands. The last ruling prince, Frederick, was the brother of Queen Consort Emma of the Netherlands.

=== Free State of Waldeck-Pyrmont (1919–1929) ===
On 13 November 1918, at the end of World War I, during the German Revolution that resulted in the fall of all the German monarchies, a representative of the revolutionary workers' and soldiers' council of Kassel came to Waldeck and declared that the monarchy was abolished. The principality became the Free State of Waldeck-Pyrmont within the Weimar Republic. However, no new constitution was produced, so the monarchical constitution of 1849/1852 remained in force de jure until 1929. The terms of the treaty with Prussia also remained in force. Following a referendum, Pyrmont was separated from Waldeck on 30 November 1921 and joined Prussia, becoming part of the new Hameln-Pyrmont district of the Province of Hanover. After this, the territory was simply the Free State of Waldeck.

The remaining territory continued to be governed according to the 1867 treaty with Prussia until it was cancelled in 1926. On 9 April 1927, the federal Financial Equalisation act (Finanzausgleichsgesetz) was amended. For Waldeck, this meant that its allocation of federal tax income was reduced by almost 600,000 Reichsmarks. Without a massive rise in local taxes, the Free State was no longer financially viable. Therefore on 1 April 1929, the state was abolished and became part of the Prussian province of Hesse-Nassau. This marked the end of Waldeck's existence as a sovereign state.

=== Developments since 1929 ===
When Waldeck joined Prussia in 1929, the three districts into which Waldeck had been divided in 1849–1850 (Eder, Eisenberg, and Twiste) were initially retained. Additionally, Höringhausen and Eimelrod, which had been exclaves of Prussia surrounded by Waldeck since 1866, were joined to Eisenberg district. In 1932, the federal government merged Eder and Eisenberg districts. The district of the Twiste was to be merged with the neighbouring district of Wolfhagen on 1 April 1934, but this was delayed after the Nazi seizure of power in 1933. A law of 28 February 1934 reversed the merger of Eder and Eisenberg and definitively cancelled the planned merger of Twiste and Wolfhagen.

On 1 February 1942, the three districts of Waldeck were merged into the new Waldeck district, which had its capital at Korbach. This new district had roughly the same borders as the old Free State. It was made part of Greater Hesse in 1945, which became the state of Hesse in the modern Federal Republic of Germany in 1946. On 1 August 1972, the city of Volkmarsen was separated from the district of Wolfhagen and reassigned to Waldeck. During the reform of the districts of Hesse in 1974, Waldeck was merged with the neighbouring district of Frankeberg to from the new district of Waldeck-Frankenberg, while the city of Züschen became a suburb of Fritzlar in Schwalm-Eder-Kreis.

== Military ==
Waldeck had raised a battalion of infantry in 1681 but for much of the subsequent history leading up to the Napoleonic Wars, Waldeckers generally served as what is commonly described as 'mercenaries', but was actually 'auxiliaries' hired out by the rulers of Waldeck for foreign service. Such was the demand that the single battalion became two in 1740 (the 1st Regiment), three battalions in 1744, four in 1767 (forming a 2nd Regiment). Most notably the foreign service was with the Dutch (the 1st and 2nd Regiments) and British (after an agreement was signed with Great Britain in 1776 to supply troops for the American War of Independence, the 3rd Waldeck Regiment, of a single battalion, was raised). The 3rd Waldeck Regiment thus served in America, where they were known under the 'umbrella term' used during that conflict for all Germans—'Hessians'. The regiment, which was made up of 4 'Battalion companies', a 'Grenadier' company, staff and a detachment of artillery, was captured by French and Spanish troops supporting the Americans and only a small number returned to Germany, where some formed part of a newly raised 5th Battalion (1784).

By the time of Napoleon's conquest of Germany, the Waldeck regiments in Dutch service had been dissolved when, as the Batavian Republic, the country was made into a kingdom ruled by Napoleon's brother Louis. Reduced to battalion strength, they now formed the 3rd battalions of the 1st and 2nd Infantry Regiments of the Kingdom of Holland. The 5th Battalion was disbanded, and Waldeck was now also obliged to provide two companies to the II Battalion, 6th German Confederation (i.e., Confederation of the Rhine) Regiment (along with two companies from Reuß) in the service of the French Empire. As with all French infantry, they were referred to as 'Fusiliers'. They served mainly in the Peninsular War against the Duke of Wellington. In 1812, the 6th Confederation Regiment was re-formed, with three companies from Waldeck and one from Reuß again forming the II Battalion. By the time of the downfall of the French Empire in 1814 the battalions in Dutch service had disappeared, but Waldeck now supplied three Infantry and one Jäger Companies to the newly formed German Confederation.

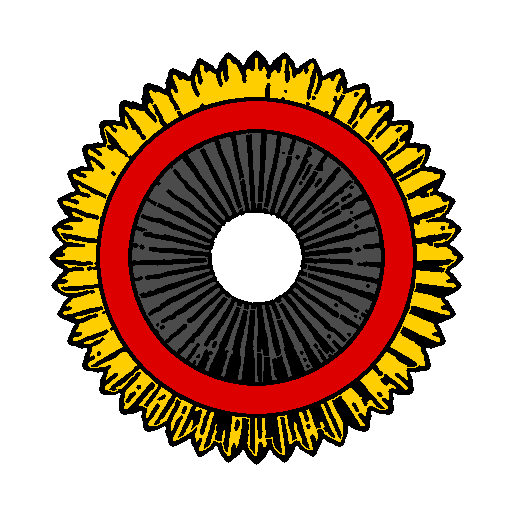
Cockade of Waldeck, worn on a Pickelhaube

By 1866, the Waldeck contingent was styled Fürstlisches Waldecksches Füselier-Bataillon, and in the Austro-Prussian War of that year Waldeck (already in a military convention with Prussia from 1862) allied with the Prussians; however the battalion saw no action. Joining the North German Confederation after 1867, under Prussian leadership, the Waldeck Fusilier Battalion became the III (Fusilier) Battalion of the Prussian Infantry Regiment von Wittich (3rd Electoral Hessian) No. 83, and as such it remained until 1918. The position of regimental 'Chef' (an honorary title) was held by the Prince of Waldeck and Pyrmont.

Unlike Hesse-Darmstadt, Hesse-Kassel (or Hesse-Cassel) retained no distinctions to differentiate them from the Prussian. The Waldeckers however, were permitted the distinction of carrying the Cockade of Waldeck on the Pickelhaube. The Waldeck battalion was garrisoned, at various times, at Arolsen/Mengeringhausen/Helsen, Bad Wildungen, Bad Pyrmont and Warburg.

The regiment saw action in the Franco-Prussian War of 1870 (where it acquired the nickname Das Eiserne Regiment), and during the First World War—as part of the 22nd Division—fought mainly on the Eastern Front.

== Gallery of castles ==
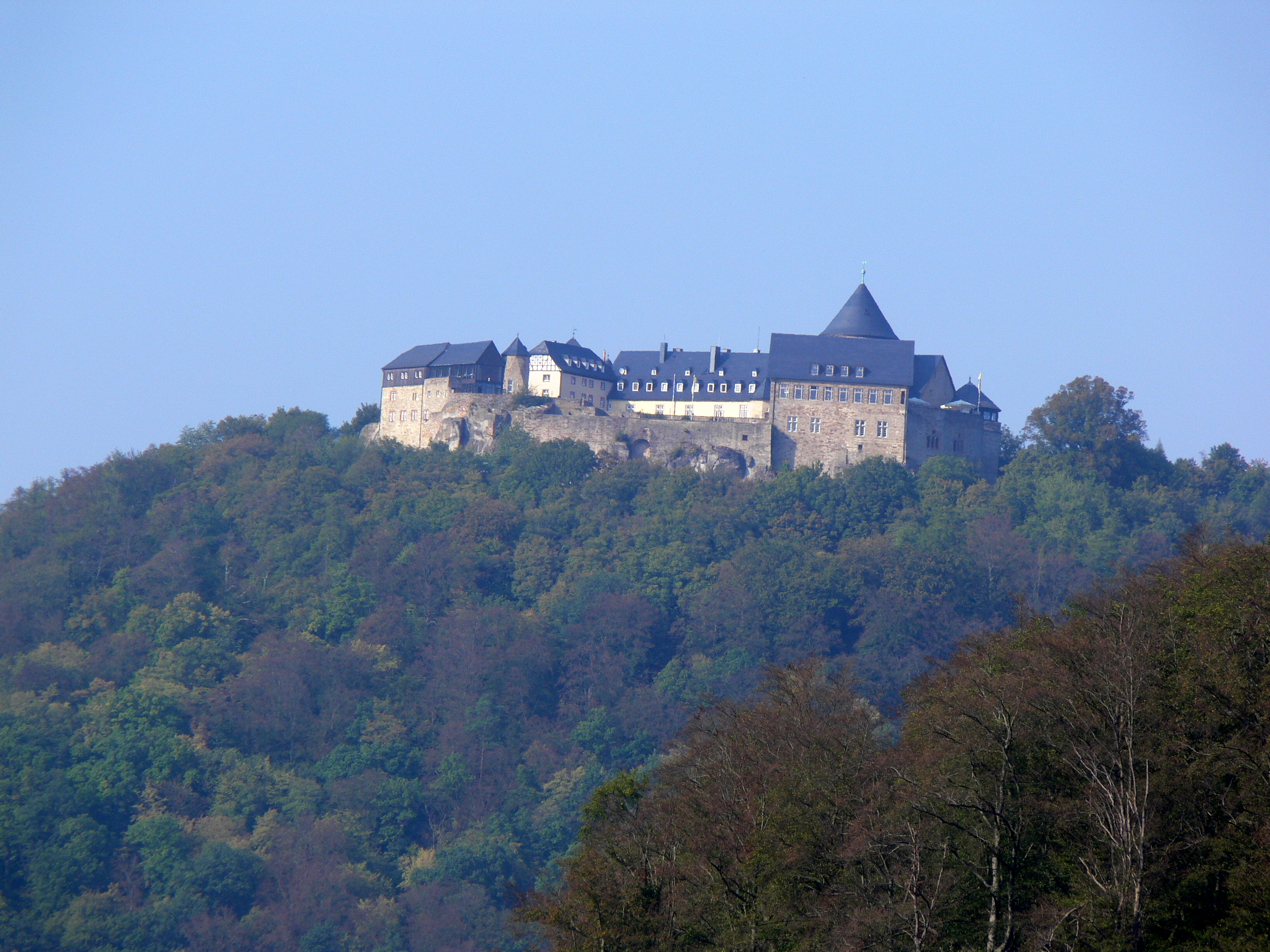
Castle Waldeck, Hesse

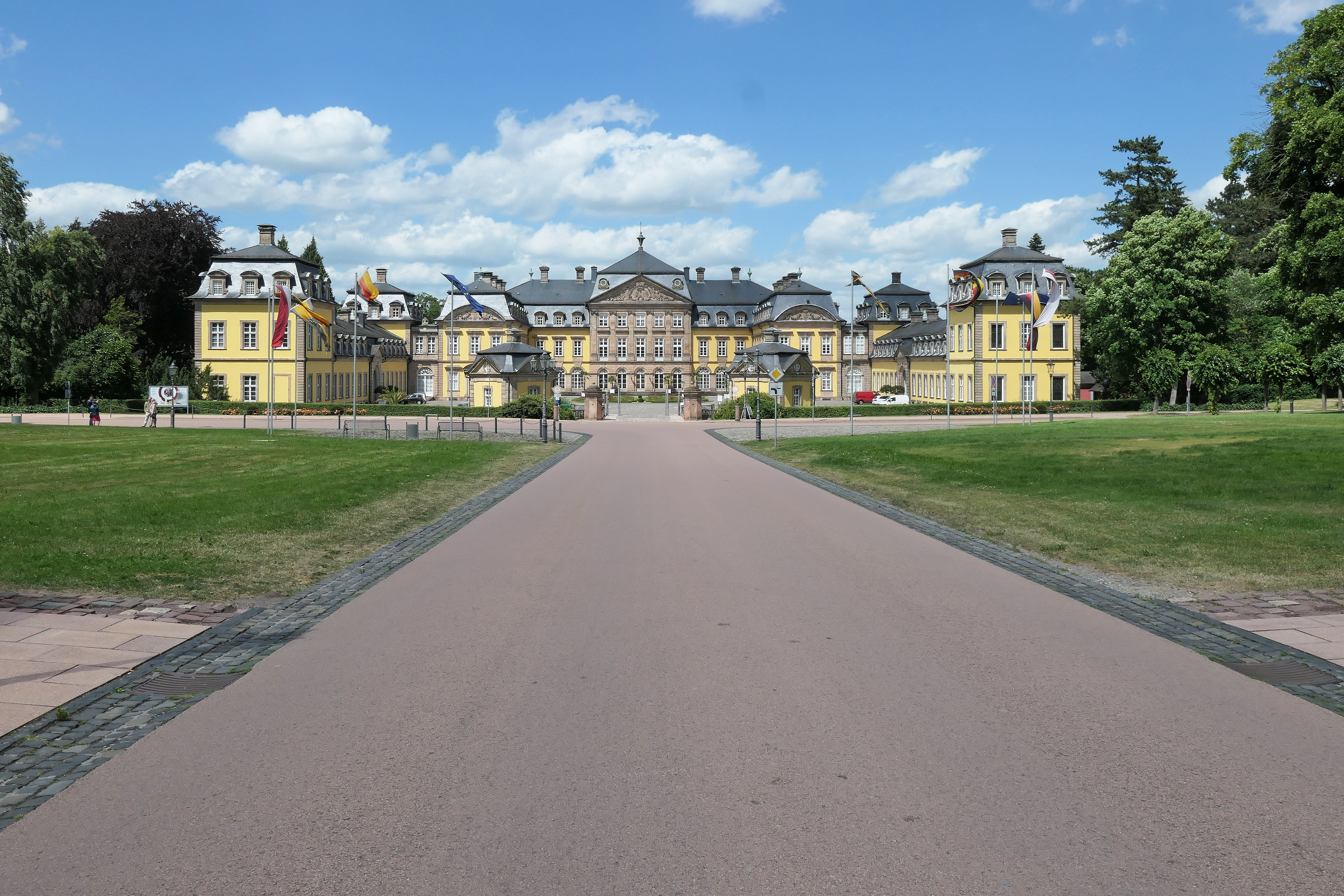
Arolsen Castle

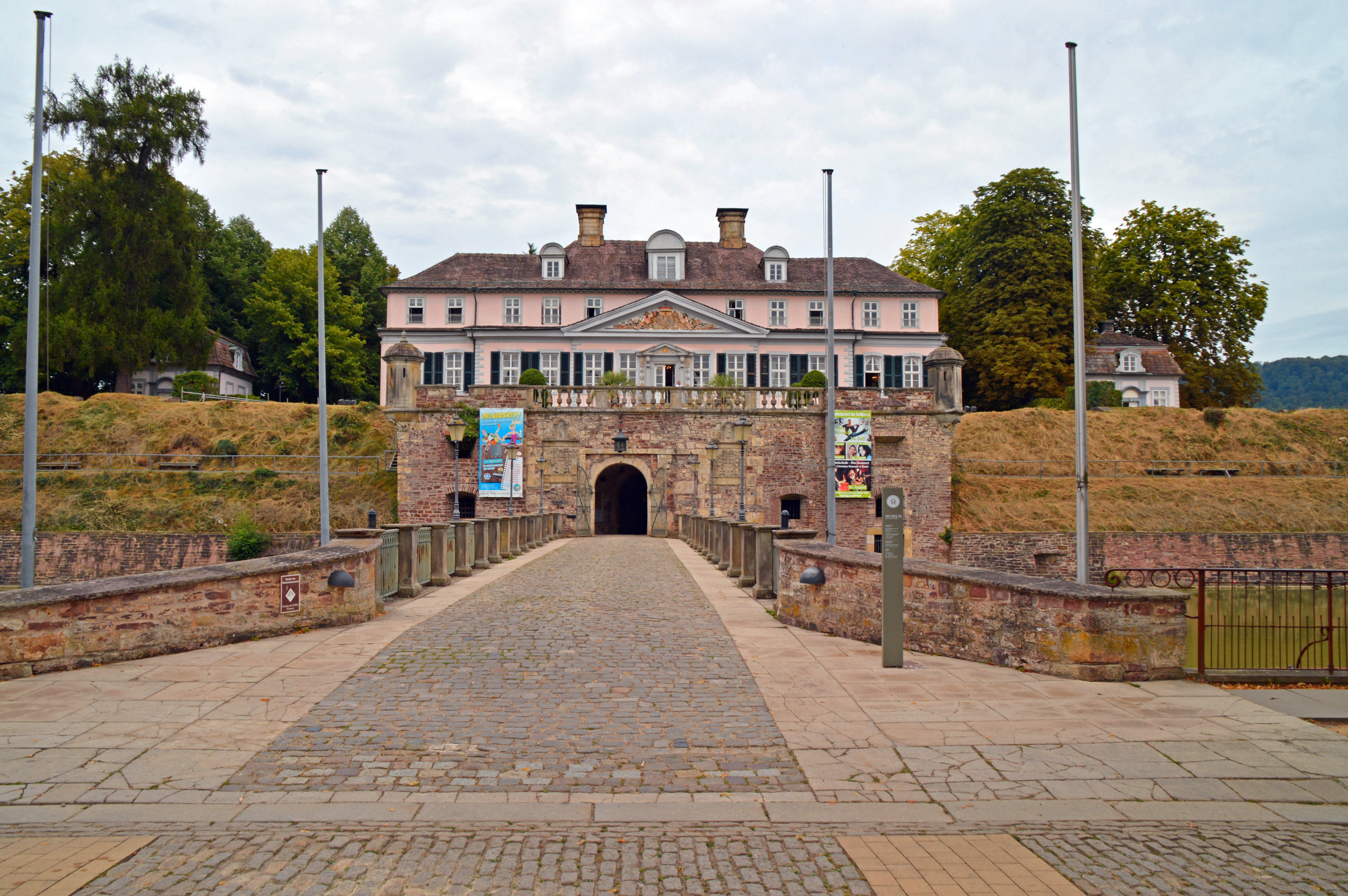
Schloss Pyrmont

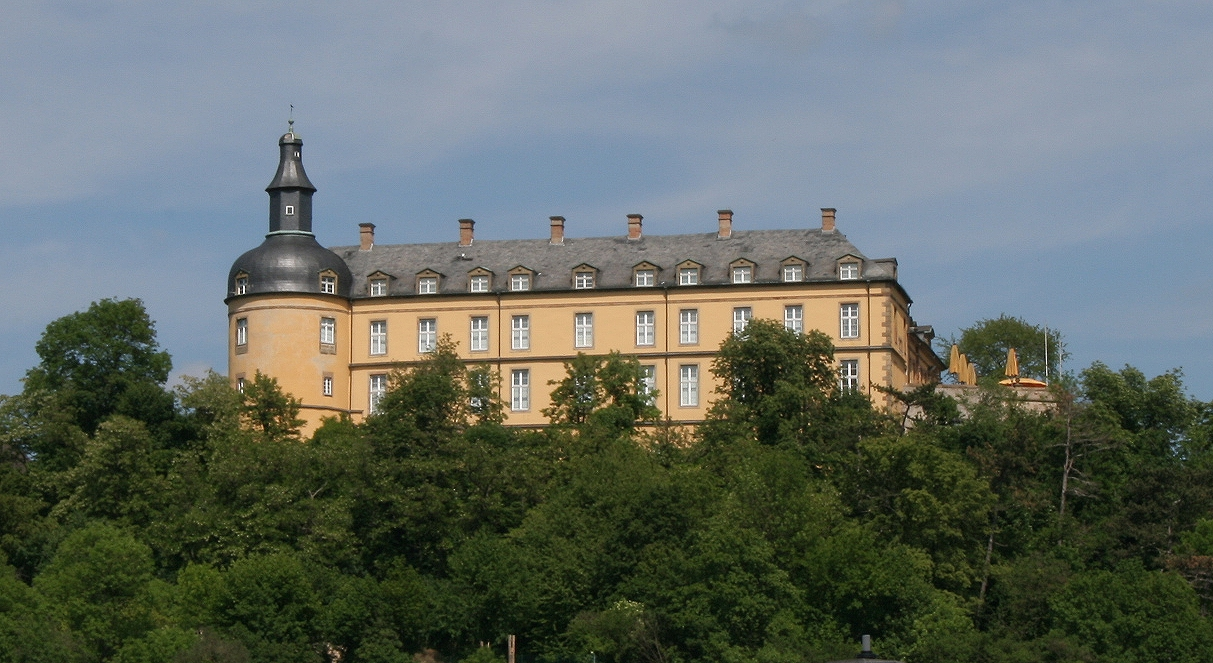
Friedrichstein Castle at Bad Wildungen

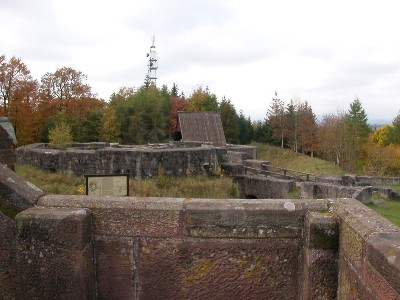
Ruins of Eisenberg Castle near Korbach

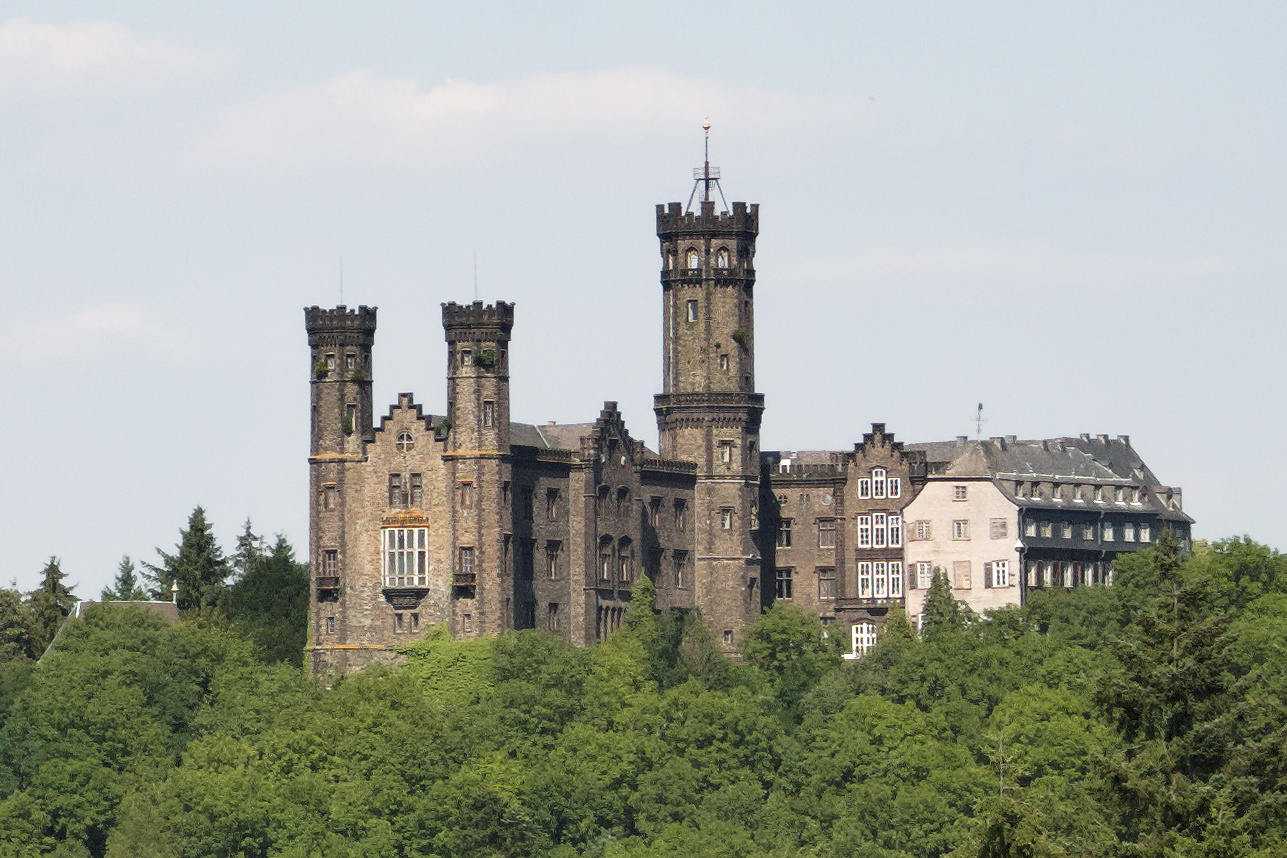
Schaumburg Castle

== Rulers of Waldeck ==
=== House of Waldeck ===
Partitions of Waldeck under Waldeck rule

County of Pyrmont (1189–1494)
County of Waldeck (1107–1486)	County of Schwalenberg (1220–1356)	County of Sternberg (1255–1402)
County of Landau (1st creation) (1397–1495)
Waldeck renamed County of Wildungen (1st creation, Waldeck line) (1486–1598)
Inherited by Spiegelberg family (1494-1557); House of Lippe (1557-1583); Gleichen family (1583-1625)
County of Landau (2nd creation) (1539–1579)
County of Eisenberg (1475–1682); Raised to Principality of Eisenberg (1682–1692)	County of Wildungen (2nd creation, Eisenberg line) (1607–1692)
County of Waldeck and Pyrmont (1692–1712) (Wildungen (Eisenberg) line); Raised to Principality of Waldeck and Pyrmont (1712–1918)	County of Bergheim (1706–1918)

Table of rulers

Ruler	Born	Reign	Ruling part	Consort	Death	Notes
Widekind I	c.1090? Nephew of Bernard, Count of Hardenhausen	1107 – 11 June 1137	County of Waldeck (at Schwalenberg until 1127)	Lutrud of Itter (d. bef. 2 March 1149) five children	11 June 1137 aged 46-47?	Brothers and first known ruling members of the family.
Volkwin I	c.1090? Nephew of Bernard, Count of Hardenhausen	1107–1111	County of Waldeck (at Schwalenberg)	Unknown	c.1111 aged c.20-21?	Brothers and first known ruling members of the family.
Regency of Lutrud of Itter (1137-1139)						Children of Widekind, divided their inheritance.
Volkwin II	1125; First son of Widekind I and Lutrud of Itter	11 June 1137 – 1178	County of Waldeck	Luitgard of Reichenbach (d. aft. 1161); 1144 (annulled 1161) five children	1178 aged 52-53	Children of Widekind, divided their inheritance.
Widekind II	1148; Second son of Widekind I and Lutrud of Itter	1178–1189	County of Pyrmont	Unknown three children	1189 aged 40-41	Children of Widekind, divided their inheritance.
Widekind III	1162; First son of Volkwin II and Luitgard of Reichenbach	1178–1190	County of Waldeck (at Schwalenberg)	Unknown three children	c.1190 aged 27-28	Sons of Volkwin II, divided the inheritance, but most of it was quickly reunited with Waldeck.
Herman I	1163; Second son of Volkwin II and Luitgard of Reichenbach	1178–1225	County of Waldeck (at Schwalenberg)	Unmarried	1225 aged 61-62	Sons of Volkwin II, divided the inheritance, but most of it was quickly reunited with Waldeck.
Henry I	c.1165 Third son of Volkwin II and Luitgard of Reichenbach	1178–1214	County of Waldeck	Heseke of Dassel (d. 25 July 1220) five children	1214 aged 48-49	Sons of Volkwin II, divided the inheritance, but most of it was quickly reunited with Waldeck.
Schwalenberg annexed to Waldeck
Gottschalk I	c.1170? Son of Widekind II	1189–1247	County of Pyrmont	Kunigunde of Limmer (d.1239) six children	1247 aged 76-77?	
Adolph I	c.1190 First son of Henry I and Heseke of Dassel	1214 – 3 October 1270	County of Waldeck	Sophie (d.1254) two children Ethelind of Lippe (1204-1273); 14 February 1254 no children	3 October 1270 aged 79-80?	Children of Henry I, divided the land. Adolph associated his eldest son to his rule, but he predeceased him.
Henry III	1225; Son of Adolph I and Sophie	c.1250–1267	County of Waldeck	Matilda of Cuyk-Arnsberg c.1240? four children	1267 aged 41-42	Children of Henry I, divided the land. Adolph associated his eldest son to his rule, but he predeceased him.
Volkwin III	c.1190 Second son of Henry I and Heseke of Dassel	1214–1255	County of Schwalenberg	Ermengard of Schwarzburg-Blankenburg (d.22 March 1274); 14 February 1254 twelve children	c.1255 aged 64-65	Children of Henry I, divided the land. Adolph associated his eldest son to his rule, but he predeceased him.
Gottschalk II	c.1220? First son of Gottschalk Iand Kunigunde of Limmer	1247–1262	County of Pyrmont	Beatrice of Hallermund (d.1272) five children	1262 aged 41-42	Children of Gottschalk I, ruled jointly.
Herman I	c.1220? Second son of Gottschalk Iand Kunigunde of Limmer	1247 – May 1265	County of Pyrmont	Hedwig (d.20 June 1262) two children	May 1265 aged 44-45	Children of Gottschalk I, ruled jointly.
Widekind I	c.1240 First son of Volkwin III and Ermengard of Schwarzburg-Blankenburg	1255 – 28 September 1264	County of Schwalenberg	Unknown c. 1246 Ermengard c. 1250 Unknown c. 1260 two children (in total)	28 September 1264 aged 23-24	Elder children of Volkwin III, divided the land. Widekind didn't have children and his part was inherited by his younger brothers, while Henry I ruled independently at Sternberg and passed it to his own descendants.
Henry I	c.1240 Second son of Volkwin III and Ermengard of Schwarzburg-Blankenburg	1255–1279	County of Sternberg	? of Woldenberg two children	1279 aged 38-39	Elder children of Volkwin III, divided the land. Widekind didn't have children and his part was inherited by his younger brothers, while Henry I ruled independently at Sternberg and passed it to his own descendants.
Adolph	c.1250? Third son of Volkwin III and Ermengard of Schwarzburg-Blankenburg	28 September 1264 – 26 January 1305	County of Schwalenberg	Adelaide (d.6 July 1274) Jutta (d.1 April 1305)	26 January 1305 aged 54-55	Younger children of Volkwin III, ruled jointly in Schwalenberg.
Albert	c.1250? Fourth son of Volkwin III and Ermengard of Schwarzburg-Blankenburg	28 September 1264 – 1317	County of Schwalenberg	Jutta of Rosdorf (d.aft.1 April 1305); 14 February 1254 twelve children	1317 aged 66-67?	Younger children of Volkwin III, ruled jointly in Schwalenberg.
Herman II	c.1240? First son of Gottschalk II and Beatrice of Hallermund	May 1265 – 25 November 1328	County of Pyrmont	Luitgard of Waldeck-Schwalenberg (d.14 September 1317) five children	25 November 1328 aged 87-88?	Children of Gottschalk II and Herman I, ruled jointly. Herman III was a son of Herman I, and cousin of the other two rulers, sons of Gottschalk I.
Gottschalk III	c.1240? Second son of Gottschalk II and Beatrice of Hallermund	May 1265 – 1279	County of Pyrmont	Unmarried	1279 aged 38-39?	Children of Gottschalk II and Herman I, ruled jointly. Herman III was a son of Herman I, and cousin of the other two rulers, sons of Gottschalk I.
Herman III	c.1240? Third son of Gottschalk II and Beatrice of Hallermund	c.1265	County of Pyrmont	Unmarried	c.1265 aged 24-25?	Children of Gottschalk II and Herman I, ruled jointly. Herman III was a son of Herman I, and cousin of the other two rulers, sons of Gottschalk I.
Adolph II	1258; First son of Henry III and Matilda of Cuyk-Arnsberg	3 October 1270 – 1276	County of Waldeck	Unmarried	13 December 1302 aged 43-44	Abdicated in 1276 to his brother Otto, after a dispute with him and his other brothers on who would marry Sophia of Hesse, daughter of Henry I, Landgrave of Hesse, which Otto won, resulting in Adolph's resignation. Entering in clergy, Adolph eventually became Bishop of Liège (1301-1302).
Otto I	1262; Third son of Henry III and Matilda of Cuyk-Arnsberg	1276 – 11 November 1305	County of Waldeck	Sophia of Hesse; 1276 nine children	11 November 1305 aged 42-43	Inherited the county as prize from his brothers after being chosen to marry Sophia of Hesse.
Hoyer I	1252; Son of Henry I and ? of Woldenberg	1279 – 28 October 1299	County of Sternberg	Agnes of Lippe c.1270? five children	28 October 1299 aged 46-47	
Henry II	c.1270? Son of Hoyer I and Agnes of Lippe	28 October 1299 – 8 January 1318	County of Sternberg	Jutta of Tecklenburg (d.bef. 8 January 1318) five children	8 January 1318 aged 47-48	
Henry IV	1282; Son of Otto I and Sophia of Hesse	11 November 1305 – 1 May 1348	County of Waldeck	Adelaide of Cleves (d.1327); 1304 six children	1 May 1348 aged 65-66	
Henry II	1287; Son of Albert and Jutta of Rosdorf	1317 – 11 April 1349	County of Schwalenberg	Elisabeth of Wölpe (d. 2 February 1336) nine children Matilda of Rietberg (d.25 April 1400); 1342/45 one child	11 April 1349 aged 61-62	
Henry III	c.1290 First son of Henry IIand Jutta of Tecklenburg	8 January 1318 – 1346	County of Sternberg	Hedwig of Diepholz (d.aft.1335) bef.14 September 1330 four children	1346 aged 55-56	Children of Hoyer II, ruled jointly.
Hoyer II	c.1290 Second son of Henry IIand Jutta of Tecklenburg	8 January 1318 – 1320	County of Sternberg	Unmarried	1320 aged 29-30	Children of Hoyer II, ruled jointly.
Gottschalk IV	1289; First son of Herman IIand Luitgard of Waldeck- Schwalenberg	25 November 1328 – 24 February 1342	County of Pyrmont	Adelaide of Homburg (d.11 October 1341) six children	24 February 1342	Children of Herman II, ruled jointly.
Henry I	c.1290 Second son of Herman IIand Luitgard of Waldeck- Schwalenberg	25 November 1328 – c.1330	County of Pyrmont	Unmarried	c.1330	Children of Herman II, ruled jointly.
Herman IV	1310; Third son of Herman IIand Luitgard of Waldeck- Schwalenberg	25 November 1328 – 1334	County of Pyrmont	Unmarried	1334 aged 23-24	Children of Herman II, ruled jointly.
Henry II	c.1320? First son of Gottschalk IV and Adelaide of Homburg	24 February 1342 – 1390	County of Pyrmont	Unknown three children	1390 aged 69-70	Children of Gottschalk IV, ruled jointly.
Gottschalk V	c.1320? Second son of Gottschalk IV and Adelaide of Homburg	24 February 1342 – 1355	County of Pyrmont	Unmarried	1355 aged 34-35?	Children of Gottschalk IV, ruled jointly.
Herman V	c.1320? Third son of Gottschalk IV and Adelaide of Homburg	24 February 1342 – 1360	County of Pyrmont	Oda (d.1360) no children/ three children	1360 aged 39-40?	Children of Gottschalk IV, ruled jointly.
Herman VI	c.1320? Fourth son of Gottschalk IV and Adelaide of Homburg	24 February 1342 – 1377	County of Pyrmont	Unmarried	1377 aged 56-57?	Children of Gottschalk IV, ruled jointly.
Henry IV	c.1330 Son of Henry IIIand Hedwig of Diepholz	1346–1385	County of Sternberg	Adelaide of Holstein-Pinneberg (c.1330–bef. 21 May 1376); 1348 two children	1385 aged 54-55?	
Otto II	c.1305 Son of Henry IV and Adelaide of Cleves	1 May 1348 – 11 November 1369	County of Waldeck	Matilda of Brunswick-Lüneburg (d.1355); 27 August 1339 two children Margaret of Löwenberg no children	11 November 1369 aged 63-64	
Henry III	c.1330 Son of Henry II and Elisabeth of Wölpe	11 April 1349 – 1356	County of Schwalenberg	Unmarried	1369 aged 38-39	Sold his estates to Waldeck in 1356, and pursued a religious life.
Schwalenberg reabsorbed in Waldeck
Henry VI of Iron	c.1340 Son of Otto II and Matilda of Brunswick-Lüneburg	11 November 1369 – 16 February 1397	County of Waldeck	Elisabeth of Berg; 16 December 1363 seven children	16 February 1397; Waldeck aged 56-57	
John	c.1350 Son of Henry IV and Adelaide of Holstein-Pinneberg	1385–1402	County of Sternberg	Unmarried	1402 aged 51-52	Left no heirs. The county was annexed to Waldeck.
Sternberg annexed to Waldeck
Henry III	c.1360? Son of Henry II	1390–1429	County of Pyrmont	Pelek two children Haseke of Spiegelberg (d.22 March 1465) two children	1429 aged 68-69?	
Adolph III	c.1365 First son of Henry VI and Elisabeth of Berg	16 February 1397 – 19 April 1431	County of Landau	Agnes of Ziegenhain (d.aft.26 December 1438); 1387 one child	19 April 1431 aged 65-66	Children of Henry VI, divided the land.
Henry VII	c.1370 Second son of Henry VI and Elisabeth of Berg	16 February 1397 – 1445	County of Waldeck	Margaret of Nassau-Wiesbaden-Idstein (1380–aft.1435); 27 August 1398 three children	c.1445 aged 74-75	Children of Henry VI, divided the land.
Henry IV	c.1410? Son of Henry III and Pelek	1429–1478	County of Pyrmont	Unmarried	1478 aged 67-68?	Children of Henry III, ruled jointly.
Maurice	1418; Son of Henry III and Haseke of Spiegelberg	1429–1494	County of Pyrmont	Margaret of Nassau-Beilstein (d.27 December 1498); 1462 no children	1494 aged 75-76?	Children of Henry III, ruled jointly.
Inherited by the Spiegelberg family (1494-1557), the House of Lippe (1557-1583) and the Gleichen family (1583-1625); Definitely annexed to Waldeck-Wildungen (from 1625)
Otto III	1389; Son of Adolph III and Agnes of Ziegenhain	19 April 1431 – 1459	County of Landau	Anna of Oldenburg (d.aft.7 April 1438); 1424 three children	1459 aged 69-70	
Wolrad I	1399; Son of Henry VII and Margaret of Nassau-Wiesbaden-Idstein	c. 1445–1475	County of Waldeck	Barbara of Wertheim (1420–aft.1443); Bef.9 March 1440 three children	1475 aged 75-76	
Otto IV	1440; Son of Otto III and Anna of Oldenburg	1459 – 14 October 1495	County of Landau	Matilda of Neuenahr (d.26 May 1465); 16 January 1464 one child Elisabeth of Tecklenburg (d.aft.1499); 1465 no children	14 October 1495; Bad Arolsen aged 54-55	
Landau annexed by Eisenberg
Philip I	1445; First son of Wolrad I and Barbara of Wertheim	1475	County of Waldeck	Joanne of Nassau-Siegen; 16 August 1452 or 14 October 1464 one child	1475 aged 29-30	Children of Wolrad I. Philip I died months after his father, and Philip II ruled as regent of his nephew.
Philip II	3 March 1453; Second son of Wolrad I and Barbara of Wertheim	1475 – 16 October 1524	County of Eisenberg	Catherine of Solms-Lich (1458–12 December 1492); 3 November 1478 six children Catherine of Querfurt (1450-22 February 1521); 1497 no children	16 October 1524; Bielefeld aged 71	Children of Wolrad I. Philip I died months after his father, and Philip II ruled as regent of his nephew.
Regency of Philip II, Count of Waldeck-Eisenberg (1475-1486)						
Henry VIII	1465; Son of Philip I and Joanne of Nassau-Siegen	1475 – 28 May 1513	County of Waldeck (1475–86) County of Wildungen (1486-1513)	Anastasia of Runkel (d.24 April 1503); Aft. 8 January 1492 three children	28 May 1513 aged 47-48	
Philip IV	1493; Bad Wildungen; Son of Henry VIII and Anastasia of Runkel	28 May 1513 – 30 November 1574	County of Wildungen	Margaret of East Frisia; 17 February 1523; Emden nine children Catherine of Hatzfeld (d.1546); 1539 no children Jutta of Isenburg-Grenzau; 6 October 1554 two children	30 November 1574; Waldeck aged 80-81	Philip associated his eldest surviving son, Samuel, in a co-rulership after his marriage. However, Samuel didn't survive his father.
Samuel	2 May 1528; Waldeck; Second son of Philip IV and Margaret of East Frisia	8 October 1554 – 6 January 1570	County of Wildungen (at Friedrichstein)	Anna Maria of Schwarzburg-Blankenburg (7 December 1538 – 11 August 1583); 8 October 1554; Waldeck seven children	6 January 1570; Friedrichstein aged 46	Philip associated his eldest surviving son, Samuel, in a co-rulership after his marriage. However, Samuel didn't survive his father.
Philip III the Elder	9 December 1486; Waldeck; Son of Philip II and Catherine of Solms-Lich	16 October 1524 – 20 June 1539	County of Eisenberg	Adelaide of Hoya; 20 November 1503; Bad Wildungen four children Anna of Cleves; 22 January 1519; Kleve four children	20 June 1539; Bad Arolsen aged 52	
Otto V	1504; First son of Philip III and Adelaide of Hoya	20 June 1539 – 1539	County of Eisenberg	Unmarried	8 March 1541 aged 36-37	Children of Philip III, divided the land, by mediation of Philip I, Landgrave of Hesse: the elder children kept Waldeck, while the younger ones inherited Landau. For the children who are usually said that did not reign (Otto, Philip and Francis), they are sometimes treated as Waldeck-Eisenberg (for Otto) and Waldeck-Landau (for Philip V and Francis), which are the parts the called reigning brothers actually ruled. This may imply a level of co-regency between each group of brothers.
Wolrad II the Scholar	27 March 1509; Eilhausen; Second son of Philip III and Adelaide of Hoya	20 June 1539 – 15 April 1575	County of Eisenberg	Anastasia Günthera of Schwarzburg-Blankenburg (31 March 1526 – 1 April 1570); 6 June 1546; Waldeck thirteen children	15 April 1575; Eilhausen aged 66	Children of Philip III, divided the land, by mediation of Philip I, Landgrave of Hesse: the elder children kept Waldeck, while the younger ones inherited Landau. For the children who are usually said that did not reign (Otto, Philip and Francis), they are sometimes treated as Waldeck-Eisenberg (for Otto) and Waldeck-Landau (for Philip V and Francis), which are the parts the called reigning brothers actually ruled. This may imply a level of co-regency between each group of brothers.
Philip V the Dove	1519; First son of Philip III and Anna of Cleves	20 June 1539 – c.1544?	County of Landau	Elisabeth von Elsen (d. 12 June 1584); 27 June 1576; Hückeswagen no children	5 March 1584; Hückeswagen aged 64-65	Children of Philip III, divided the land, by mediation of Philip I, Landgrave of Hesse: the elder children kept Waldeck, while the younger ones inherited Landau. For the children who are usually said that did not reign (Otto, Philip and Francis), they are sometimes treated as Waldeck-Eisenberg (for Otto) and Waldeck-Landau (for Philip V and Francis), which are the parts the called reigning brothers actually ruled. This may imply a level of co-regency between each group of brothers.
John I the Pious	1521; Second son of Philip III and Anna of Cleves	20 June 1539 – 9 April 1567	County of Landau	Anna of Lippe; 1 October 1550; Detmold eight children	9 April 1567; Landau aged 45-46	Children of Philip III, divided the land, by mediation of Philip I, Landgrave of Hesse: the elder children kept Waldeck, while the younger ones inherited Landau. For the children who are usually said that did not reign (Otto, Philip and Francis), they are sometimes treated as Waldeck-Eisenberg (for Otto) and Waldeck-Landau (for Philip V and Francis), which are the parts the called reigning brothers actually ruled. This may imply a level of co-regency between each group of brothers.
Francis II	1526; Third son of Philip III and Anna of Cleves	20 June 1539 – c.1540?	County of Landau	Maria Gogreve (d.1580); 1563 no children	29 July 1574 aged 47-48	Children of Philip III, divided the land, by mediation of Philip I, Landgrave of Hesse: the elder children kept Waldeck, while the younger ones inherited Landau. For the children who are usually said that did not reign (Otto, Philip and Francis), they are sometimes treated as Waldeck-Eisenberg (for Otto) and Waldeck-Landau (for Philip V and Francis), which are the parts the called reigning brothers actually ruled. This may imply a level of co-regency between each group of brothers.
Philip VI the Younger	4 October 1551; First son of John I and Anna of Lippe	9 April 1567 – 9 November 1579	County of Landau	Unmarried	9 November 1579; Darmstadt aged 28	Children of John I, ruled jointly. As neither of them left descendants, Landau was reabsorbed in Eisenberg.
Francis III	27 June 1553; Cloppenburg; Second son of John I and Anna of Lippe	9 April 1567 – 12 March 1597	County of Landau	Unmarried	12 March 1597 aged 43	Children of John I, ruled jointly. As neither of them left descendants, Landau was reabsorbed in Eisenberg.
Landau was reabsorbed into Eisenberg
Daniel	1 August 1530; Third son of Philip IV and Margaret of East Frisia	30 November 1574 – 7 June 1577	County of Wildungen	Barbara of Hesse; 11 November 1568; Kassel no children	7 June 1577; Waldeck aged 46	Left no heirs, and was succeeded by his brother Henry.
Josias I	18 March 1554; Eisenberg; First son of Wolrad II and Anastasia Günthera of Schwarzburg-Blankenburg	15 April 1575 – 6 August 1588	County of Eisenberg	Marie of Barby-Mühlingen; 8 March 1582 four children	6 August 1588; Eisenberg aged 34	Children of Wolrad II, ruled jointly.
Wolrad III	16 June 1563; Waldeck; Second son of Wolrad II and Anastasia Günthera of Schwarzburg-Blankenburg	15 April 1575 – 12 November 1587	County of Eisenberg	Unmarried	12 November 1587; Anneau aged 24	Children of Wolrad II, ruled jointly.
Henry IX	10 December 1531; Fourth son of Philip IV and Margaret of East Frisia	7 June – 3 October 1577	County of Wildungen	Anna of Viermund-Nordenbeck; 19 December 1563; Korbach no children	3 October 1577; Werbe aged 45	Died shortly after his brother, and didn't have children as well.
Günther	19 June 1557; Friedrichstein; Son of Samuel and Anna Maria of Schwarzburg-Blankenburg	3 October 1577 – 23 May 1585	County of Wildungen (at Friedrichstein since 1570)	Margaret of Waldeck-Landau (1559-20 October 1580); 15 December 1578; Bad Wildungen no children Margaret of Gleichen (28 May 1556 – 14 January 1619); 20 May 1582; Gräfentonna one child	23 May 1585; Friedrichstein aged 27	His second marriage brought the county of Bad Pyrmont back to Waldeck control.
Regency of Margaret of Gleichen (1585-1598)						His death determined the extinction of the main branch of the House of Waldeck.
William Ernest	8 June 1584; Son of Günther and Margaret of Gleichen	23 May 1585 – 16 September 1598	County of Wildungen	Unmarried	16 September 1598; Tübingen aged 14	His death determined the extinction of the main branch of the House of Waldeck.
Wildungen briefly annexed to Eisenberg
Christian	25 December 1585; Eisenberg; First son of Josias I and Maria of Barby-Mühlingen	6 August 1588 – 31 December 1637	County of Wildungen (in Eisenberg in co-rulership until 1607)	Elisabeth of Nassau-Siegen; 18 November 1604; Bad Wildungen fifteen children	31 December 1637; Waldeck aged 52	Children of Josias I, divided their inheritance in 1607.
Wolrad IV the Pious	7 June 1588; Eisenberg; Second son of Josias I and Maria of Barby-Mühlingen	6 August 1588 – 6 October 1640	County of Eisenberg	Anna of Baden-Durlach; 8 September 1607; Durlach ten children	6 October 1640; Bad Arolsen aged 52	Children of Josias I, divided their inheritance in 1607.
Philip VII	25 November 1613; Eisenberg; Second son of Christian and Elisabeth of Nassau-Siegen	31 December 1637 – 24 February 1645	County of Wildungen	Anna Catharina of Sayn-Wittgenstein; 26 October 1634; Frankfurt am Main six children	24 February 1645; Jankov aged 31	Children of Christian, divided their inheritance
John II	7 November 1623; Waldeck; Fourth son of Christian and Elisabeth of Nassau-Siegen	31 December 1637 – 10 October 1668	County of Landau	Alexandrine Maria of Vehlen-Meggen (d.27 February 1662); 17 December 1644 no children Henriette Dorothea of Hesse-Darmstadt; 10 November 1667; Merlau no children	10 October 1668; Landau aged 44	Children of Christian, divided their inheritance
Landau reannexed to Wildungen
Philip Theodore	2 November 1614; Bad Arolsen; Second son of Wolrad IV and Anna of Baden-Durlach	6 October 1640 – 7 December 1645	County of Eisenberg	Maria Magdalena of Nassau-Siegen; 25 August 1639; Culemborg two children	7 December 1645; Korbach aged 31	
Regency of George Frederick, Count of Waldeck-Eisenberg (1645-1659)						Left no heirs, and was succeeded by his uncle and previous regent.
Henry Wolrad	28 March 1642; Culemborg; Son of Wolrad IV and Anna of Baden-Durlach	7 December 1645 – 15 July 1664	County of Eisenberg	Juliane Elisabeth of Waldeck-Wildungen; 27 January 1660 no children	15 July 1664; Graz aged 22	Left no heirs, and was succeeded by his uncle and previous regent.
Regencies of Anna Catharina of Sayn-Wittgenstein (1645-1660) and Henry Wolrad, Count of Waldeck-Eisenberg (1659-1660)						Children of Philip VII, ruled jointly.
Christian Louis	29 July 1635; Waldeck; First son of Philip VII and Anna Catharina of Sayn-Wittgenstein	24 February 1645 – 12 December 1706	County of Wildungen (1645–92) County of Waldeck and Pyrmont (1692–1706)	Anna Elisabeth of Rappoltstein (7 March 1644 – 6 December 1676); 2 July 1658 fifteen children Johanna of Nassau-Idstein (14 September 1657 – 14 March 1733); 6 June 1680; Idstein ten children	12 December 1706; Bad Arolsen aged 71	Children of Philip VII, ruled jointly.
Josias II	2 July 1636; Bad Wildungen; Second son of Philip VII and Anna Catharina of Sayn-Wittgenstein	24 February 1645 – 8 August 1669	County of Wildungen (1645–92) County of Waldeck and Pyrmont (1692–1706)	Wilhelmine Christine of Nassau-Siegen; 26 January 1660; Bad Arolsen seven children	8 August 1669; Heraklion aged 33	Children of Philip VII, ruled jointly.
George Frederick	31 January 1620; Bad Arolsen; Third son of Wolrad IV and Anna of Baden-Durlach	15 July 1664 – 19 November 1692	County of Eisenberg (1664–82) Principality of Eisenberg (1682–92)	Elisabeth Charlotte of Nassau-Siegen; 29 November 1643; Culemborg nine children	19 November 1692; Bad Arolsen aged 72	In 1682, he received the title of Prince. Left no surviving male heirs. The principality was inherited by Wildungen, which was kept as a county until a few years later.
Eisenberg (except Culemborg) was definitely annexed to Wildungen
Louise Anna	18 April 1653; Berlin; Daughter of George Frederick and Elisabeth Charlotte of Nassau-Siegen	19 November 1692 – 30 June 1714	County of Eisenberg (at Culemborg)	George IV, Count of Erbach-Fürstenau; 22 August 1671; Arolsen four children	30 June 1714; Bad Arolsen aged 61	Kept the lordship of Culemborg. As she survived all her children, the lordship was inherited, after her death, by her nephew, Ernest, Duke of Saxe-Hildburghausen.
Culemborg was inherited by Saxe-Hildburghausen
Frederick Anton Ulrich	26 November 1676; Waldeck; Son of Christian Louis and Anna Elisabeth of Rappoltstein	12 December 1706 – 1 January 1728	County of Waldeck and Pyrmont (1706–12) Principality of Waldeck and Pyrmont (1712–28)	Louise of the Palatinate-Birkenfeld; 22 October 1700; Hanau eleven children	1 January 1728; Bad Arolsen aged 51	Children of Christian Louis. Frederick Anton was elevated in 1712 to hereditary prince by Emperor Charles VI. On 30 September 1695, their father had changed the primogeniture house law of the Waldeck house, which he had enacted in 1685 and modified in 1687, insofar as he issued a paragium under the established suzerainty of the ruling line of the house, consisting of the three villages of Bergheim, Königshagen and Welle. This paragium, or vassal line, was inherited by Christian Louis' second son, Josias I.
Josias I	20 August 1696; Bad Arolsen; Son of Christian Louis and Johanna of Nassau-Idstein	12 December 1706 – 2 February 1763	County of Bergheim	Dorothea Sophia of Solms-Rödelheim (27 January 1698 – 6 February 1774); 17 January 1825 seven children	2 February 1763; Bergheim aged 66	
Christian Philip	13 October 1701; Edertal; First son of Frederick Anton Ulrich and Louise of the Palatinate-Birkenfeld	1 January – 17 May 1728	Principality of Waldeck and Pyrmont	Unmarried	17 May 1728; Mannheim aged 26	Survived his father for a few months, and left no descendants. He was succeeded by his brother.
Charles August	24 September 1704; Hanau; Second son of Frederick Anton Ulrich and Louise of the Palatinate-Birkenfeld	17 May 1728 – 29 August 1763	Principality of Waldeck and Pyrmont	Christiane Henriette of Palatinate-Birkenfeld; 19 August 1741; Zweibrücken seven children	29 August 1763; Bad Arolsen aged 58	
Frederick Charles August	25 October 1743; Zweibrücken; Second son of Charles August and Christiane Henriette of Palatinate-Birkenfeld	29 August 1763 – 24 September 1812	Principality of Waldeck and Pyrmont	Unmarried	24 September 1812; Bad Arolsen aged 68	Left no heirs and was succeeded by his brother.
George	20 July 1732; Bergheim; Second son of Josias I and Dorothea Sophia of Solms-Rödelheim	2 February 1763 – 9 April 1771	County of Bergheim	Christine of Isenburg-Meerholz (22 November 1742 – 20 March 1808); 31 August 1766 no children	9 April 1771; Bergheim aged 38	Left no heirs and was succeeded by his brother.
Josias II	16 October 1733; Bergheim; Third son of Josias I and Dorothea Sophia of Solms-Rödelheim	9 April 1771 – 4 January 1788	County of Bergheim	Christine Wilhelmine of Isenburg-Büdingen (24 June 1756 – 13 November 1826); 5 March 1772 no children	4 January 1788; Bergheim aged 54	
Josias III	13 May 1774; Bergheim; First son of Josias II and Christine Wilhelmine of Isenburg-Büdingen	4 January 1788 – 9 June 1829	County of Bergheim	Wilhelmine of Löwenstein-Wertheim-Freudenberg (23 April 1774 – 25 June 1817); 10 January 1802 no children	9 June 1829; Bergheim aged 55	Left no heirs and was succeeded by his brother.
George I	6 May 1747; Bad Arolsen; Third son of Charles August and Christiane Henriette of Palatinate-Birkenfeld	24 September 1812 – 9 September 1813	Principality of Waldeck and Pyrmont	Augusta of Schwarzburg-Sondershausen; 12 September 1784; Otterwisch three children	9 September 1813; Rhoden aged 66	
George II	20 September 1789; Weil am Rhein; Son of George I and Augusta of Schwarzburg-Sondershausen	9 September 1813 – 15 May 1845	Principality of Waldeck and Pyrmont	Emma of Anhalt-Bernburg-Schaumburg-Hoym; 26 June 1823; Schaumburg five children	15 May 1845; Bad Arolsen aged 55	
Charles	17 November 1778; Bergheim; Fourth son of Josias II and Christine Wilhelmine of Isenburg-Büdingen	9 June 1829 – 21 January 1849	County of Bergheim	Karoline Schilling von Canstatt (2 February 1798 – 7 October 1866); 25 April 1819 six children	21 January 1849; Bergheim aged 70	
Regency of Emma of Anhalt-Bernburg-Schaumburg-Hoym (1845-1858)						
George Victor	14 January 1831; Bad Arolsen; Son of George II and Emma of Anhalt-Bernburg-Schaumburg-Hoym	15 May 1845 – 12 May 1893	Principality of Waldeck and Pyrmont	Helena of Nassau; 26 September 1853; Wiesbaden seven children Louise of Schleswig-Holstein-Sonderburg-Glücksburg; 29 April 1891; Luisenlund one child	12 May 1893; Mariánské Lázně aged 62	
Adalbert I	19 February 1833; Bergheim; Son of Charles and Karoline Schilling von Canstatt	21 January 1849 – 24 July 1893	County of Bergheim	Agnes Caroline of Sayn-Hohenstein (18 April 1834 – 18 February 1886); 3 August 1858 seven children Ida Charlotte of Sayn-Wittgenstein-Hohenstein (25 February 1837 – 7 May 1922); 18 October 1887 no children	24 July 1893; Bergheim aged 60	
Frederick	20 January 1865; Bad Arolsen; Son of George Victor and Helena of Nassau	12 May 1893 – 13 November 1918	Principality of Waldeck and Pyrmont	Bathildis of Schaumburg-Lippe; 9 August 1895; Náchod four children	26 May 1946; Bad Arolsen aged 81	Brother of Queen Emma of the Netherlands. Abolition of the monarchy in 1918.
Adalbert II	6 January 1863; Bergheim; Son of Adalbert I and Agnes Caroline of Sayn-Hohenstein	24 July 1893 – 13 November 1918	County of Bergheim	Unmarried	23 February 1934; Bergheim aged 71	Abolition of the monarchy in 1918.

== See also ==
- Arolsen Castle
