= Otto III of Waldeck =

Otto III, Count of Waldeck
- Born: c. 1389
- Died: 1458 or 1459
- Noble family: House of Waldeck
- Spouse: Anna of Oldenburg
- Father: Adolph III, Count of Waldeck
- Mother: Agnes of Ziegenhain

Otto III, Count of Waldeck-Landau (c. 1389 – 1458 or 1459) was the second ruling count of the elder Waldeck-Landau line, which had started. He was the son of Count Adolph III, who had founded the elder Waldeck-Landau in 1397, and his wife, Agnes of Ziegenhain.

== Life ==
Like his father, Otto III resided at Landau Castle in the town of Landau, which is now part of Bad Arolsen. During his reign the Landgraves of Hesse consolidated their power in Central and Lower Hesse, and suppressed the influence of the Archbishopric of Mainz. Otto's officials acts were often the result of the circumstances created by this power struggle. On 8 October 1431, shortly after he had inherited his county from his father, he transferred the City of Landau and Landau Castle to Landgrave Louis I of Hesse and then accepted them from the Landgrave as a Hessian fief for himself and his sons John and Henry. Until then the Counts of Waldeck — and Ziegenhain — had managed to maintain their independence by carefully maneuvering between Hesse and Mainz. However, after Mainz had been defeated at Fritzlar in July 1427 and at Fulda in August, and had admitted defeat in the Mainz-Hesse War in the peace treaty of Frankfurt of December 1427, this was no longer an option, and even Mainz had had to accept nearly all of its possessions in Central and Lower Hesse as Hessian fiefs.

In 1431 Otto III pledged the village of Ehringen (now part of Volkmarsen) to Landgrave Louis I. The amount he received for the village was later increased several times, in 1455, 1472 and again in 1534. This later led to a controversy between Waldeck and Hesse, which was only resolved with a compromise in 1635, andconfirmed in the Peace Treaty of Westphalia of 1648. The compromise was that Waldeck ceded sovereignty over Ehringen to Hesse, but retained all other rights (mill right, prebendary of the church, etc.).

On 30 August 1438, Otto renewed and expanded his feudal pledge to Landgrave Louis I. He promised that if his relatives in the Waldeck-Waldeck line would ask his permission to submit themselves to another Prince, or to sell of pledge their half of Waldeck, he would withhold his consent. Simultaneously, Otto III lent 3100 Rhenish guilders to Louis I, who gave Otto as securities Schöneberg Castle and the district of Hofgeismar (excluding the town of Hofgeismar, which was still held by Mainz). This possessions were still held by Waldeck-Landau when Otto's son Otto IV died in 1495.

In 1450, Count John II of Ziegenhain and Nidda died without a mail heir. Landgrave Louis I impounded his inheritance, despite objections of John II's relatives. This caused a dispute, which lasted until 1495. Otto III, whose sister Elisabeth was John II's widow, and his son Otto IV renounced their claims on Ziegenhain and Nidda, the Lordship of Lißberg and Lißberg Castle on 30 September 1455 orally and in writing before a tribunal chaired by the Hessian marshall John of Meisenburg, allegedly in return for a financial compensation. The deed mentions that they received in 1000 guilders in return, plus he village of Twiste in the Twistetal valley, plus an annual sum, and that they had also lend Louis I 1000 guilders — a relatively small sum for the renunciation of their rights to such a large inheritance.

His only remarkable domestic policy was his care for the Béguinage in Mengeringhausen, which he strengthened economically.

== Family ==
In 1424, Otto III married Anna of Oldenburg. They had at least three sons: John, Henry and Otto IV (d. 1495). John and Henry were mentioned as co-vassals in the deed of enfeoffemment of 8 October 1431, but were absent in the renewed deed of 31 August 1438; this suggests that they had already died at that time. Otto IV would later succeed his father as Count of Waldeck-Landau.

== Footnotes ==
Otto III of Waldeck House of Waldeck
Preceded by Adolph III	Count of Waldeck-Landau; 1431-1459	Succeeded by Otto IV
