= Adolph III =

Adolph III may refer to:

- Adolf III of the Marck (1334–1394)
- Adolph III, Count of Waldeck (1362–1431)
