= Henry IV of Waldeck =

Count of Waldeck

Henry IV, Count of Waldeck
- Born: c. 1282/1290
- Died: 1 May 1348
- Buried: Marienthal Abbey in Netze
- Noble family: House of Waldeck
- Spouse: Adelaide of Cleves
- Father: Otto I, Count of Waldeck
- Mother: Sophie of Hesse

Henry IV, Count of Waldeck (c. 1282/1290 – 1 May 1348) was the ruling Count of Waldeck from 1305 to 1344. He was the second ruling count named "Henry", which is why some authors call him "Henry II". However, two earlier non-ruling members of the House of Waldeck are usually called Henry II and Henry III, and the subject of this article is commonly called Henry IV.

He was the eldest son of Otto I and his wife Sophie, the daughter of Landgrave Henry I of Hesse.

== Reign ==
Like his father, Henry served the Archbishopric of Mainz as Amtmann in northern Hesse and the Eichsfeld.

Immediately after the start of his reign in 1306, Henry began the construction of Wetterburg Castle. This gave rise to a dispute with Archbishop Henry II of Cologne, who argued that the castle was located in Westphalia, which he held. Henry II demanded that the castle be demolished. Henry IV argued that his family had held a castle on that site for a long time, and he was just rebuilding it. A lengthy legal battle ensued. In 1310, Duke Eric I, Duke of Saxe-Lauenburg of Saxe-Lauenburg ruled in favour of Mainz. However, Henry IV appealed. Arbitration by a neighbouring nobleman was not possible, as they were all biased. Cologne then occupied Marsberg and also claimed Medebach and Canstein. Henry IV strenuously objected. Bishop Louis II of Münster, who was a member of the House of Hesse and thus a distant relative of Henry IV, nevertheless ruled that the occupation of Marsberg was justified and that Cologne was entitled to demolish Wetterburg Castle. In 1325, a compromise was reached, in which Waldeck and Cologne would share ownership of Wetterburg Castle

For unknown reasons, Henry IV was taken prisoner by Archbishop Peter of Mainz in 1307. A deed sealed by King Albert I of Germany from March 1308 mentions that Peter and Henry IV have reconciled their differences. Henry was then released from prison.

In 1312, he promised Landgrave Otto I to support him in his dispute with the Duchy of Brunswick-Lüneburg. The Dukes of Brunswick-Lüneburg were also fighting a feud against the Archbishopric of Mainz, whose Amtmann Henry IV had been since 1305. Close to Brunswick's Schonenberge Castle, Henry IV built a castle of his own, in order to neutralize Schoeneberge. In 1313, he made an alliance with Archbishop Peter of Mainz against Brunswick-Lüneburg. In 1315, Henry IV and Count William of Arnsberg divided the County of Rüdenberg, which until then they had administered jointly, between themselves.

As a reward for loyal his service, Emperor Louis IV made Henry IV patron of the Imperial City of Dortmund and supervisor of the Jews in the city. In 1337, he was also made supervisor of the Jews in the bishoprics of Münster and Osnabrück. He was tasked to collect imperial taxes from the Jews. In 1332, the Lords of Grafschaft sold him a 50% share in Nordenau Castle. He later purchased another share.

In 1344, Henry wanted to retire from government for health reasons. With the consent of his sons an inheritance contract was completed, which provided that in future the county would not be divided and there could only be a single of Count of Waldeck at any one time. This agreement, however, did not last long, and Waldeck was divided several times after Henry's death.

Henry died in 1348 and was buried in the "Waldeck Chapel" in the Marienthal Abbey in Netze (now part of Waldeck). His grave stone can still be found there.

== Marriage and issue ==
In 1304, he married Adelaide of Cleves (d. after 26 July 1327), daughter of Dietrich VII, Count of Cleves. He had several children with her:

- Otto II was the eldest and succeeded as Count of Waldeck
- Dietrich was canon in Cologne, Münster and Mainz
- Henry V was also canon and held prebendaries in Cologne and Minden, where he was a Dean
- Elisabeth of Waldeck (d. before 22 June 1385), married Count John, Count of Nassau-Hadamar of Nassau-Hadamar (d. 20 January 1365), the son of Count Emicho I
- Armgard, married a Count of Diepholz
- Matilda
