= Adolf II of Waldeck =

Rulign Count of Waldeck and later Roman Catholic bishop

Adolf II of Waldeck (c. 1250 – 13 December 1302) was count of Waldeck from 1270 to 1276 and prince-bishop of Liège from 1301 to 1302.

== Life ==
Adolf was a son of Count Henry III and of Mechthild of Cuyk-Arnsberg. In 1270 he succeeded his grandfather Adolf I of Waldeck as Count of Waldeck. He arranged a treaty with his brothers Otto and Gottfried, which stipulated that one brother would marry Sophia of Hesse (a daughter of Landgrave Henry I of Hesse), and that the other brother would follow suit and also marry. The brother to marry Sophia eventually turned out to be Otto. In 1276 Adolf fell from Otto's favour and became a priest, at first a canon (domheer) of Liège Cathedral, and later a provost (domproost) in the cathedrals of Trier and Utrecht. His other brother Gottfried also entered the church, becoming a canon in Cologne and Liège Cathedrals, treasurer (thesaurarius) in Münster Cathedral and in 1304 bishop of Minden. On the death of William II, Adolf was initially his intended successor as bishop of Utrecht but, under pressure from count John II of Holland, Adolf found his claims overridden in favour of appointing John's brother Guy of Avesnes. Through Pope Boniface VIII he was granted the bishopric of Liège instead, but he died shortly afterwards.

Adolphus II of Waldeck House of Waldeck Born: c. 1250 Died: 13 December 1302
Regnal titles
Preceded by Adolf I of Waldeck	Count of Waldeck; 1270–1276	Succeeded by Otto I of Waldeck
Catholic Church titles
Regnal titles
Preceded by Hugh of Chalon	Prince-Bishop of Liège; 1301–1302	Succeeded by Theobald
