= Otto II of Waldeck =

Count of Waldeck

Otto II, Count of Waldeck
- Born: Before 1307
- Died: 1369
- Noble family: House of Waldeck
- Spouses: Matilda of Brunswick-Lüneburg; Margaret
- Father: Henry IV, Count of Waldeck
- Mother: Adelaide of Cleves

Otto II, Count of Waldeck (before 1307 – 1369) was the count of Waldeck from 1344 until his death.

== Family ==
Otto was the son of Count Henry IV of Waldeck and his wife Adelaide of Cleves. He married in 1339 or 1340 to Matilda, a daughter of Duke Otto III of Brunswick-Lunebürg. They had at least two children:

- Henry VI, Otto's successor
- Sophie, a nun at Volkhardinghausen monastery

Matilda died in 1357 or earlier. Soon after her death, Otto married his second wife, Margaret, the widow of Heinemann of Itter (d. 1356). No children from this marriage are known.

== Reign ==
Otto II was co-regent with his father from 1332. His father withdrew from government in 1344, allowing Otto II to rule alone. In 1345, he concluded an everlasting covenant with Archbishop Henry III of Mainz. Just as during his father's reign, there were disputes with the archbishops of Cologne in their capacity as dukes of Westphalia. A compromise was reached in 1346.

In 1349, Emperor Charles IV enfeoffed Otto with the County of Waldeck. This implied that he was elevated to Imperial Count. After his father-in-law, Duke Otto III of Brunswick-Lüneburg, died without a male heir, Otto claimed his inheritance. However, Otto III's younger brother William II managed to secure the Principality of Lüneburg. Emperor Charles IV ordered William II to pay Otto II an indemnity of 100,000 marks, which was about half the principality's value. However, William II never paid.

After Archbishop Gerlach of Mainz and Landgrave of Hesse had taken the larger part of the Lordship of Itter in 1357, Gerlach mortgaged his share to Otto II for 1,000 marks carat silver. In 1381, Otto mortgaged this share of Itter to Thile I Wolf of Guldenberg, who mortgaged the Hesse share of Itter two years later. His descendants retained Itter well into the 16th century. Waldeck finally redeemed the mortgage in 1542, Hesse in 1562.

On 8 July 1358, Otto, who was still reeling from the plague epidemic of 1349, commissioned the Knights Hospitaller at Wiesenfeld (now part of Burgwald to establish a hospital in Niederwildungen. He donated his old Mill Court on the Wilde river between Altwildungen and Niederwildungen for this purpose. Construction of the hospital lasted from 1358 to 1369 and became a commandry of the order in 1372.

In 1368, the Archbishop of Mainz and the Landgrave of Hesse formed an alliance against Otto II and his son Henry VI, to take his castle at Wildungen. A tribunal convicted the counts of Waldeck of violating their covenant with Mainz and ordered them to pay damages.

Otto II died in 1369. It is not known where he was buried.
