= 2020 Volkmarsen ramming attack =

Vehicle attack in Volkmarsen, Germany

Volkmarsen ramming attack
- Volkmarsen (Hesse) Volkmarsen (Germany)
- Location: 51.4098°N 9.1177°E; Volkmarsen, Hesse, Germany
- Date: February 24, 2020; 6 years ago
- Attack type: Vehicle-ramming attack
- Weapon: Mercedes-Benz station wagon
- Deaths: 0
- Injuries: 88
- Perpetrator: Maurice Pahler
- Convictions: 89 counts of attempted murder; causing grievous bodily harm; dangerous interference with road traffic

On 24 February 2020, a man rammed his car against a crowd at a carnival parade in Volkmarsen, Hesse, Germany, injuring 88 people. In total, 150 people were considered "negatively affected or traumatized by the incident", and it was later described to the courts as a "miracle" that no one had been killed. The attack came only days after nine people were killed in a terrorist shooting spree in Hanau, near Frankfurt.

The perpetrator, 29-year-old Maurice Pahler, was found to have filmed and extensively planned the attack. In 2021, Pahler was sentenced to life in prison for attempted murder with a particular severity of guilt, meaning that he would not be automatically eligible for parole. He refused to give any motive or reasoning for the crime.

== Attack ==
At about 2:45 p.m., a silver Mercedes car was driven first through plastic barricades set up for the parade and then into a crowd at a carnival parade celebrating Rosenmontag in Volkmarsen, Hesse, Germany. Eyewitnesses informed BBC News that the driver sped up to attack the civilians, and seemed to target children. 88 people were injured, 35 of them seriously. Twenty of those injured were children, the youngest of whom was a two-year-old.

Once the car initially crashed, bystanders rushed to the car. A woman tried to take the keys from the man, but was choked and had her hair pulled; the suspect tried to restart the car, but three men assaulted the suspect to disable him. 88 people were physically injured in the attack, while 150 in total were "negatively affected or traumatized by the incident".

== Aftermath ==
Hesse authorities cancelled all carnival parades as a precaution that day, and reconvened them on the following morning with enhanced security. Chancellor Angela Merkel said her thoughts were with the injured and their relatives and thanked the police and medical services.

On the one year anniversary of the attack, an ecumenical service was held in a local Protestant church to remember the victims.

=== Legal proceedings ===
The attacker was identified as Maurice Pahler, a 29-year-old local man known to police for crimes including assault. He was initially detained and arrested on suspicion of attempted homicide. A motive for the attack was not immediately obvious determined as the suspect was said to not be in a fit state of mind to be questioned. A second person who filmed the attack was arrested; it is not clear if he was involved in the attack. As of 24 February, Pahler was receiving medical treatment for injuries sustained in the incident but would later be brought before an investigating judge.

The attack came only days after the terrorist attack in Hanau, and there was initially suspicion as to whether the motive was similar. It was initially reported that the attacker was under the effect of alcohol and drugs, but this was later corrected as false. The court found that he had planned the attack extensively and described it as a "miracle" that no one had been killed. Pahler filmed the attack with a dash-cam he had bought to record the crimes.

Pahler was sentenced to life in prison for attempted murder, causing grievous bodily harm, and dangerous interference with road traffic. He was sentenced with a particular severity of guilt, meaning that he would not be automatically eligible for parole. He was diagnosed with a "severe" personality disorder with narcissistic, paranoid, and schizoid traits, but was found to be fully culpable for his actions. He refused to give any motive or reasoning for his attack.
