= Henry VII of Waldeck =

Count of Waldeck from 1397 until his death

Henry VII, Count of Waldeck
- Died: after 1442
- Noble family: House of Waldeck
- Spouse: Margaret of Nassau-Wiesbaden-Idstein
- Father: Henry VI, Count of Waldeck
- Mother: Elizabeth of Berg

Henry VII of Waldeck (died after 1442) was Count of Waldeck from 1397 until his death, after which he acted several times as bailiff for the Electorate of Mainz in Upper and Lower Hesse.

== Life ==
He was the second son of the Count Henry VI of Waldeck and Elizabeth of Berg and was considered a belligerent man.

Even before his father, he attacked the Bishopric of Paderborn. He was accused of having destroyed the castle and town of Blankenrode. In 1395, he was made to swear that he would never again invade Paderborn, and Waldeck had to transfer its share in the castle and town of Liebenau to Paderborn.

After his father's death, the county of Waldeck was divided between Henry and his brother Adolph III. Thus, Adolph III founded the older line of Waldeck-Landau and Henry founded the Waldeck-Waldeck line. He resided at Waldeck Castle.

In 1399, he was appointed bailiff of the districts Fritzlar, Hofgeismar, Battenberg, Rosenthal, Elenhog and Wetter of the Electorate of Mainz. Henry reckoned that this office provided him with enough power that he could afford to break his alliance with the Landgraviate of Hesse. At Whitsuntide 1400, he marched his troops to Kassel. He could not take the city. He did, however, set fire to several neighbouring villages. He lost his office in 1404, but was re-appointed temporarily in 1406. In 1410, he was again appointed bailiff in Upper and Lower Hesse. He then attacked Hesse and destroyed the city of Kirchhain, whereupon Landgrave Hermann II persuaded Archbishop John II of Mainz to relieve henry of his duties. Peace was restored in 1420 and Henry made an alliance with Landgrave Louis I that would last until his death.

On 5 June 1400, Henry and his men, who included Friedrich von Hertingshausen and Konrad von Falkenberg, attacked Duke Frederick I of Brunswick-Wolffenbüttel at Kleinenglis, south of Fritzlar. A fierce battle followed and the Duke was killed. Duke Frederick had been on his way home from a congress of princes in Frankfurt, where King Wenceslaus had been deposed. Frederick thought that he had a good chance to succeed Wenceslaw, but Archbishop John II of Mainz favoured the election of Rupert, the Elector Palatine. The newly elected King Rupert investigated the attack on Duke Frederick and Henry was sentenced to the foundation of an altar with perpetual requiem mass at the St. Peter's Church in Fritzlar.

Henry also had disputes with his brother Adolph, some of them violent. In 1421, they settled their disputes and confirmed the division of the county. They also agreed the neither of them would be allowed to pledge or sell off parts of the county without knowledge and consent of the other. Deeds relating to either half of the county were to be archived in a common archive at Waldeck Castle. Completed fiefs would revert to joint ownership. Future disputes were to be investigated and settled by the burgmannen and councils. In later years, this treaty was renewed and refined.

Henry led numerous feuds with neighboring nobles, including the Lords of Padberg and the Bengler League. The Padberg Feud, also known as Korbach Feud, lasted from 1413 to 1418. Every year on the day of Saint Regina's feast on June 20 a mass and a procession are held in the Hanseatic City of Korbach in remembrance of this feud.

In 1424, Henry and his son Wolrad pledged half of their territory for life to Landgrave Louis I for 22000guilders. Louis paid up and the burgmannen, vassals, burghers and peasants of the affected area paid him homage. However, Archbishops Conrad of Mainz and Dietrich of Cologne, in his capacity as administrator of the Archdiocese of Paderborn objected and Henry and Wolrad recanted, claiming they had promised the land to Mainz in an earlier treaty, and in 1426, they pledged the land to Mainz for 18000guilders instead, opening their castles to the Archbishops of Mainz and Cologne. This was one of the causes of the Mainz-Hessian War of 1427. Conrad offered Louis to refund him his 22000guilders, but Louis turned the offer down. He declared war on the archbishop on 21 July 1427. Henry and Wolrad fought on the Mainz side in this war. Hesse won the war and Henry had to refund the 22000guilders. In 1438, Henry saw himself forced to acknowledge Landgrave Louis as his liege lord.

== Marriage and issue ==
In 1398, Henry married Margaret of Nassau-Wiesbaden-Idstein. They had three children:

- Wolrad, who would succeed him as Count of Waldeck
- Elizabeth
- Margaret

== Footnotes ==
Henry VII of Waldeck House of Waldeck Died: c. 1444
Preceded by Henry VI as Count of Waldeck	Count of Waldeck-Waldeck; 1397 – c. 1444	Succeeded by Wolrad I
