= Otto I of Waldeck =

Count of Waldeck (c.1262 – 1305)

Otto I, Count of Waldeck
- Born: c. 1262
- Died: 11 November 1305
- Noble family: House of Waldeck
- Spouse: Sophia of Hesse
- Father: Henry III, Count of Waldeck
- Mother: Matilda of Cuyk-Arnsberg

Otto I, Count of Waldeck (c. 1262 – 11 November 1305) was the count of Waldeck from 1275/76 until his murder in November 1305.

Otto was the youngest son of Henry III of Waldeck and Matilda of Cuyk-Arnsberg, a daughter of Count Gottfried III of Arnsberg and heiress of Wewelsburg. Henry III died in 1267, a few years before his father, Count Adolf I of Waldeck, and therefore the inheritance of Waldeck went from Adolf I to his grandsons. Henry III's eldest son Adolf II of Waldeck served as regent of the County of Waldeck upon his grandfather's death in 1270. However, at the time of Henry III's death, his three sons with their mother Matilda decided that the County of Waldeck should descend to whoever of the three sons were to marry the then underage Sophia, daughter of Henry I, Landgrave of Hesse. Ultimately, it was Henry III's youngest son Otto who married Sophia of Hesse in 1275/76. Upon the marriage of Otto and Sophia, Adolf II abdicated rule of the County of Waldeck in favor of his brother Otto and entered the clergy, later becoming Bishop of Liège in 1301. Henry III's second son, Gottfried, became Bishop of Minden in 1304. Their sister Adelheid married Simon I of Lippe in Detmold in 1276.

During the 45-year reign of Adolf I, he made Waldeck a viable territory. He founded the cities of Waldeck, Sachsenhausen and Freienhagen. He began building the castle and town of Rhoden and gained the rule of Korbach. He also gained influence over Lichtenfels Castle with the cities of Fürstenberg and Sachsenberg. Otto I continued his grandfather's policy of expansion to the west against the Duchy of Westphalia which was owned by the Archbishops of Cologne. During the War of the Limburg Succession, he sided with Duke John I of Brabant in the war against Archbishop Siegfried of Westerburg. During this war, Otto destroyed the Cologne city of Hallenberg. The war ended in the decisive victory of Duke John's side in the Battle of Worringen. As a result of the war, Otto gained Volksmarsen, half of Kugelsburg and Canstein Castle. In 1298 Otto acquired the Nordenau Castle and became a threat to the Cologne city of Winterburg. Count Otto I's efforts led to significant success in expanding the territory controlled by Waldeck.

In 1305, a feud broke out in Eichsfeld, where Otto's enemies, the Lords of Strive and Adelebsen, were opposing the city of Heiligenstadt. Otto, who had served the Archbishopric of Mainz as bailiff for Eichsfeld since 1303, was obligated to assist Heiligenstadt. During this feud, Otto was captured by his enemies, put in a dungeon and strangled against the rules of martial law. He is buried in the grave chapel of St. Nicholas in the Marienthal monastery in Netze, next to his parents and grandparents. His grave slab is the oldest monument still preserved in the monastery. The monastery had been donated by the Waldeck family in 1228. Otto's father Henry III was the first member of the Waldeck family to be buried there.

== Family ==
Otto I married prior to 14 November 1276 to Sophia (c.1264 – 1340), daughter of Henry I, Landgrave of Hesse. They had nine children:

- Henry IV (died 1348), who succeeded his father, married Adelheid of Cleves, daughter of Dietrich VII, Count of Cleves
- Adolf III (died 1348), who became Canon at Hildesheim
- Gottfried (died after 1337), who became Canon at Mainz
- Eberhard (died 1334), who became Canon in Minden
- Ludwig (died 1354), who became Canon in Münster
- Matilda (died after 1340), married Eberhard III of Breuberg
- Elizabeth (died 1371), married Count Dietrich III from Hohnstein zu Klettenberg
- Adelheid (1290–1329), married Count Wilhelm I of Katzenelnbogen
- Otto, the youngest son, died in 1310

== Ancestry ==
Ancestors of Otto I of Waldeck

8. Henry I of Waldeck and Schwalenberg
4. Adolf I of Waldeck
9. Heseke of Dassel
2. Henry III of Waldeck
5. Sophie
1. Otto I, Count of Waldeck
12. Gottfried II of Arnsberg
6. Gottfried III of Arnsberg
13. Agnes of Rüdenberg
3. Matilda of Cuyk-Arnsberg
14. Henry I of Blieskastel
7. Adelheid of Blieskastel
15. Agnes of Sayn
