= Wolrad I of Waldeck =

Count of Waldeck-Waldeck

Wolrad I, Count of Waldeck
- Born: c. 1399
- Died: after 1 February 1475
- Noble family: House of Waldeck
- Spouse: Barbara of Wertheim
- Father: Henry VII, Count of Waldeck
- Mother: Margaret of Nassau-Wiesbaden-Idstein

Count Wolrad I of Waldeck (c. 1399 – after 1 February 1475) was a son of Count Henry VII of Waldeck and his wife Margaret of Nassau-Wiesbaden-Idstein. He was named after his maternal grandfather, and was the first Wolrad in the House of Waldeck. He succeeded his father as the reigning Count of Waldeck-Waldeck in 1442 – whether this was before or after his father's death is still unclear. The House Waldeck had been split since 1397 into the senior Waldeck-Landau line and the junior Waldeck-Waldeck line.

== Life ==
Before he took office in Waldeck, Wolrad was appointed by Archbishop Conrad III of Mainz as magistrate and bailiff of the towns and castles of Amöneburg, Battenberg, Neustadt, Rosenthal, Hausen in Knüllwald, Fritzlar, Jesberg, Hofgeismar, Naumburg, Wetter and Rhoden near Diemelstadt, plus the associated villages and bailiwicks, in Electoral Mainz. In 1438, Count John II of Ziegenhain succeeded him on this post. John II was in turn succeeded in 1439 by Landgrave Louis I of Hesse.

Wolrad died in 1475 and was succeeded by his son Philip I. When Philip I died later that year, his younger brother Philip II became regent for Philip I's minor son Henry VIII. In 1486, Henry VIII and Philip II decided to split the county: Henry VIII received Waldeck-Wildungen, the southern part, and Philip II received the northern part, Waldeck-Eisenberg.

== Marriage and issue ==
In March 1440 Wolrad married Barbara of Wertheim, a daughter of Count Michael I of Wertheim and Sophie von Henneberg. Wolrad and Barbara joined the Kalands Brethren in Korbach.

They had three children:

- Philip I (1445–1475), Count of Waldeck-Waldeck
- Philip II (born: 3 March 1453; died: 26 October 1524), canon, acted from 1475 as the regent of his nephew, Henry VIII of Waldeck-Waldeck; became Count of Waldeck-Eisenberg in 1486
- Elizabeth (born: c. 1455; died: 15 March 1513), married on 15 October 1471 Duke Albert II of Brunswick-Grubenhagen (1419–1485) lived and after his death on the Old Castle at Osterode am Harz.

Wolrad I of Waldeck House of Waldeck Born: c. 1399 Died: after 1 February 1475
Preceded by Henry VII	Count of Waldeck-Waldeck c. 1444-1475	Succeeded by Philip I
