= Philip II of Waldeck =

Count of Waldeck-Eisenberg

Philip II of Waldeck-Eisenberg
- Born: 3 March 1453
- Died: 26 October 1524 (aged 71); Sparrenberg Castle in Bielefeld
- Noble family: House of Waldeck
- Spouses: Catherine of Solms-Lich; Catherine of Querfurt
- Father: Wolrad I, Count of Waldeck
- Mother: Barbara of Wertheim

Count Philip II of Waldeck-Eisenberg (3 March 1453 – 26 October 1524 at Sparrenberg Castle in Bielefeld) was count of Waldeck-Eisenberg. His parents were Count Wolrad I of Waldeck and Barbara of Wertheim (b. 1422).

As a younger son, Philip was originally destined for a career in the church, but after his elder brother Philip I died, he left the clergy for dynastic reasons and ruled the County of Waldeck as regent for his underage nephew Henry VIII. In 1486, Philip and his nephew divided the county, with Philip II receiving Waldeck-Eisenberg and Henry VIII receiving Waldeck-Widlungen.

In 1499, a very rich gold vein was discovered in Eisenberg, and after three years there was a long dispute between the Counts of Waldeck and the Lord of Viermund about the mining rights on Mount Eisenberg.

In 1505, Duke William IV of Jülich-Berg allowed Philip II as his governor to operate mines in the districts of Ravensberg and Sparrenberg. Apart from Philip, the board of the mining company included two bailiffs for William IV, representatives of the City of Bielefeld, including both mayors, and a mining expert from Thuringia.

In 1507, he acquired Steffenburg Castle, which had been constructed in Adorf by Curd von Ense in the early 16th Century. He was an ally of Archbishop Albert of Mainz, which was why his was taken prisoner in March 1516 in Padberg by Götz von Berlichingen, who was fighting a feud against Albert at the time. After a long stay in captivity, Philip was released, in exchange for a ransom of 8900 ducats.

== Marriage and issue ==
On 3 November 1478, he married his first wife, Catherine (d. 1492), the daughter of Count Kuno of Solms-Lich and Walpurgis of Dhaun. He had six children with her:

- George (1483–1504)
- Anna (b. 1485)
- Philip III (9 December 1486 in Waldeck – 1539)
- Clara (b. 1487)
- Francis (7 July 1488 Sparrenberg – 15 July 1553 in Wolbeck), bishop of Osnabrück and Münster and administrator of Minden
- Elizabeth (b. 1489)

In 1497, he married Catherine of Querfurt (died: 1521 in Kelbra), the widow of Count Günther XXXVIII of Schwarzburg-Blankenburg. This marriage remained childless.
