= Henry VI of Waldeck =

Count of Waldeck

Henry VI, Count of Waldeck
- Born: c. 1340
- Died: 16 February 1397; Waldeck Castle
- Buried: Marienthal Monastery in Netze (now part of Waldeck)
- Noble family: House of Waldeck
- Spouse: Elizabeth of Berg
- Father: Otto II, Count of Waldeck
- Mother: Matilda of Brunswick-Lüneburg

Count Henry VI of Waldeck, nicknamed of Iron, (c. 1340 – 16 February 1397 at Waldeck Castle, was Count of Waldeck from 1369 to 1397. The nickname of Iron refers to the fact that, due to his involvement in numerous wars and feuds, he often wore armour. Although he was only the third reigning Count named Henry, he is generally known as Henry VI, because there had earlier been non-ruling counts of Waldeck named Henry II, Henry III and Henry V.

== Life ==
His father was Count Otto II; his mother was Matilda of Brunswick-Lüneburg. Before coming to power in 1356, Henry made a pilgrimage to Jerusalem. After his return, he had Landau Castle rebuilt. He lived there at first; however, he later moved to Waldeck Castle.

He was co-ruler with his father from 1356. In 1366, he acted with great force against the city of Korbach, to punish it for disobedience. He captured the city and took hostages to Landau. After long negotiations, Korbach submitted to him. He later acted quite favourably towards the city, granting the citizens numerous rights and allowing them to fortify the city.

In 1369, his father died and Henry VI began ruling alone. As his mother's heir, he was a candidate to inherit the Principality of Lüneburg after the death of Duke William II, also in 1369. A delegation of the Estates of Brunswick-Lüneburg even travelled to Waldeck to meet him. However, when they learned about his treatment of Korbach, they returned immediately. The inheritance of Lüneburg was therefore left in doubt, leading to the Lüneburg War of Succession.

In 1370, Henry VI sold the possessions Bigge, Rüdenberg and Olsberg and his share of Rappelstein Castle and some possessions around Medelon to the Lords of Gaugreben. In 1371, he created an alliance with Landgrave Henry II of Hesse to fight the robber barons of Padberg. In 1374, he joined the Westphalian Peace Alliance.

During his reign, he participated in numerous feuds and other disputes. He besieged the Hessian capital Kassel twice.

Henry died in 1397 of the plague. He was buried in the Waldeck chapel in Marienthal Monastery in Netze (now part of Waldeck). His sons divided Waldeck: Adolph III started the elder line of Waldeck-Landau and Henry VII started the Waldeck-Waldeck line.

== Marriage and issue ==
On 16 December 1363, he married Elizabeth of Berg (c. 1340 - 4 October 1388). With her, he had the following children:

- Adolph III
- Henry VII
- Margaret, married Bernard VI, Lord of Lippe
- Elizabeth, married a Count of Gleichen
- Irmgard, married a Count of Everstein
- Matilda, abbess at Heerse Abbey
- Elizabeth, abbess at Kaufungen Abbey

He also had an illegitimate daughter:

- Gutha von Waldeck, married Nikolaus von Wallenrodt, and had issue
