= Adolph III of Waldeck =

Count of Waldeck-Landau

Adolph III, Count of Waldeck
- Born: 1362
- Died: 19 April 1431
- Noble family: House of Waldeck
- Spouse: Agnes of Ziegenhain
- Father: Henry VI, Count of Waldeck
- Mother: Elisabeth of Berg

Adolph III, Count of Waldeck (1362 – 19 April 1431) was Count of Waldeck-Landau from 1397 until his death. He was the founder of the elder Waldeck-Landau line.

== Life ==
Adolph III was a son of Count Henry VI and his wife Elisabeth of Berg. His older brother was Henry VII of Waldeck-Waldeck. In 1387, Adolph married Agnes, the daughter of Count Gottfried VIII of Ziegenhain. The marriage produced a son, Otto III, who would later succeed Adolph. Adolph III and his family lived at Landau Castle, which his father had assigned to him, and remained there after the county had been divided into Waldeck-Landau and Waldeck-Waldeck after his father's death in 1397.

His reign was marked with conflicts with Henry VII. He disagrees with Henry's attack on the area around Kassel in 1400, which destroyed the alliance Waldeck had had with the Landgraviate of Hesse. Hesse responded by invading Waldeck. Adolph tried to restore good relations with Hesse. In 1406, Henry published nineteen complaints about Adolph and proposed to have the issue arbitrated by the mayors and councillors from Korbach and Niederwildungen. Adolph, in turn, accused Henry of selling Schartenberg to the Archbishop of Cologne without his consent. Attempts to mediate between the brothers were unsuccessful.

It was not until 1421 that Adolph's brother-in-law, Count John II of Ziegenhain, managed to mediate a compromise between the two brothers and theirs sons, Otto III and Wolrad. The division of the county was confirmed, however, the brothers also agreed that no land would be sold off or mortgaged without knowledge and consent from the other family branch. Deeds relating to either half of the county were to be archived in a common archive at Waldeck Castle. Completed fiefs would revert to joint ownership. Future disputes were to be investigated and settled by the burgmannen and councils. In later years, this agreement was renewed and refined.

Adolph III of Waldeck House of Waldeck Born: 1362 Died: 19 April 1431
Preceded by Henry VI as Count of Waldeck	Count of Waldeck-Landau; 1397-1431	Succeeded by Otto III
