= Diemelstadt =

- Town
- Coat of arms

- Location of Diemelstadt within Waldeck-Frankenberg district
- Interactive map of Diemelstadt
- Location within Germany Location within Hesse
- Coordinates: 51°27′36″N 08°58′48″E
- Country: Germany
- State: Hesse
- Admin. region: Kassel
- District: Waldeck-Frankenberg
- Subdivisions: 9 Stadtteile

Government
  - Mayor (2023–29): Andreas Fritz (Ind.)

Area
  - Total: 82.55 km^{2} (31.87 sq mi)
- Elevation: 304 m (997 ft)

Population (2025-12-31)
  - Total: 5,211
  - Density: 63.13/km^{2} (163.5/sq mi)
- Time zone: UTC+01:00 (CET)
  - Summer (DST): UTC+02:00 (CEST)
- Postal codes: 34474
- Dialling codes: 05694, 05641, 05642, 02992
- Vehicle registration: KB
- Website: www.diemelstadt.de

Diemelstadt (German pronunciation: [ˈdiːml̩ˌʃtat]) is a small town in Waldeck-Frankenberg district in Hesse, Germany.

== Geography ==
=== Location ===
Diemelstadt lies in a small "bay" of Hesse that thrusts into, and is surrounded on three sides by, North Rhine-Westphalia. The River Diemel, the town's namesake, does not cross through the municipal area, forming only parts of the town limits, and at the same time parts of the boundary between Hesse and North Rhine-Westphalia. One river that does cross through the municipal area, however, is the Orpe, a north-flowing tributary to the Diemel that empties into the larger river at the northern town limits. Diemelstadt lies 12 km north of Bad Arolsen, and 31 km southeast of Paderborn.

=== Neighbouring municipalities ===
Diemelstadt borders in the north and east on the town of Warburg (Höxter district in North Rhine-Westphalia), in the southeast on the town of Volkmarsen, in the south on the town of Bad Arolsen (both in Waldeck-Frankenberg), and in the west on the town of Marsberg (Hochsauerlandkreis in North Rhine-Westphalia).

=== Constituent municipalities ===
The town consists of the following centres:

- Ammenhausen (89 inhabitants)
- Dehausen (92 inhabitants)
- Helmighausen (320 inhabitants)
- Hesperinghausen (452 inhabitants)
- Neudorf (193 inhabitants)
- Orpethal (164 inhabitants)
- Stadt Rhoden (administrative seat) (1901 inhabitants)
- Wethen (423 inhabitants)
- Wrexen (1540 inhabitants)

(population figures as of 2018)

== History ==
The town of Diemelstadt came into being on 1 November 1970 through the voluntary merger of the town of Rhoden (Stadt Rhoden – The centre is still known as such, although it is no longer an independent town) and the smaller municipality of Wrexen. Later the same year, Ammenhausen, Dehausen, Helmighausen, Neudorf and Wethen also joined, with Hesperinghausen and Orpethal following the next year.

== Politics ==
=== Town council ===
The town council's 25 seats are apportioned thus, in accordance with municipal elections held on 26 March 2006:

SPD	10 seats
CDU	8 seats
FWG	5 seats
FDP	1 seat
BL-Bürgerliste für Diemelstadt	1 seat

Note: FWG and BL are citizens' coalitions.

=== Town partnerships ===
Diemelstadt maintains partnership links with the following:

- (Germany) Kranichfeld, Thuringia, since 1990

== Culture and sightseeing ==
=== Music ===
- Gesangverein 1865 Wrexen (singing club)
- Gesangverein "Concordia" (Rhoden) (singing club)
- Posaunenchor Rhoden (trombone choir)
- Posaunenchor Helmighausen (trombone choir)
- Shanty-Chor Hesperinghausen 1993

=== Buildings ===
- Rhoden stately home and hereditary princely tomb
- Gaulskopf settlement (early mediaeval fortification works)
- Alt-Rhoden church ruins
- Mediaeval Old Town in Rhoden with half-timbered buildings

== Economy and infrastructure ==
=== Transport ===
==== Highway ====
- A 44 (Kassel – Dortmund)
- Bundesstraße 252 (Gießen – East Westphalia)
- Bundesstraße 68 (Paderborn)
- Bundesstraße 7 (Ruhr area – Kassel – Eisenach)

Note: Bundesstraße = Federal Highway.

==== Railway ====
- ICE station in Warburg, Westphalia (about 15 min. away) (hub, trains to Berlin/Düsseldorf, Halle, Hagen, Hamm, Münster, Paderborn, Kassel)
- Station in Scherfede (about 5 min. away) (regional trains to Hagen/Warburg)
- Station in Bad Arolsen (about 10 min. away) (regional trains to Kassel/Korbach)

==== Airports ====
- Paderborn Lippstadt Airport (about 30 min. away)
- Kassel-Calden Airport (about 25 min. away)

=== Established businesses ===
- Schnitzmeier & Sänger Gbr. – motor vehicle electrics and vehicle technology, in Diemelstadt-Rhoden (Warburger Weg 3)
- Smurfit Kappa C. D. Haupt Papier- und Pappenfabrik GmbH & Co. KG
- Sprick GmbH Bielefelder Papier- und Wellpappenwerke & Co. (branch plant)
- Hewe Fensterbau GmbH & Co. KG
- Jäkel GmbH & Co. KG machine knife factory

=== Education ===
- Grundschule Wrexen (primary school)
- Schlossbergschule Rhoden ("coöperative comprehensive school")

== Personalities ==
=== Sons and daughters of the town ===
- Wilhelm Dietzel, politician and Hessian State Minister for the Environment, Rural Space and Consumer Protection
