= Volkmarsen =

- Town
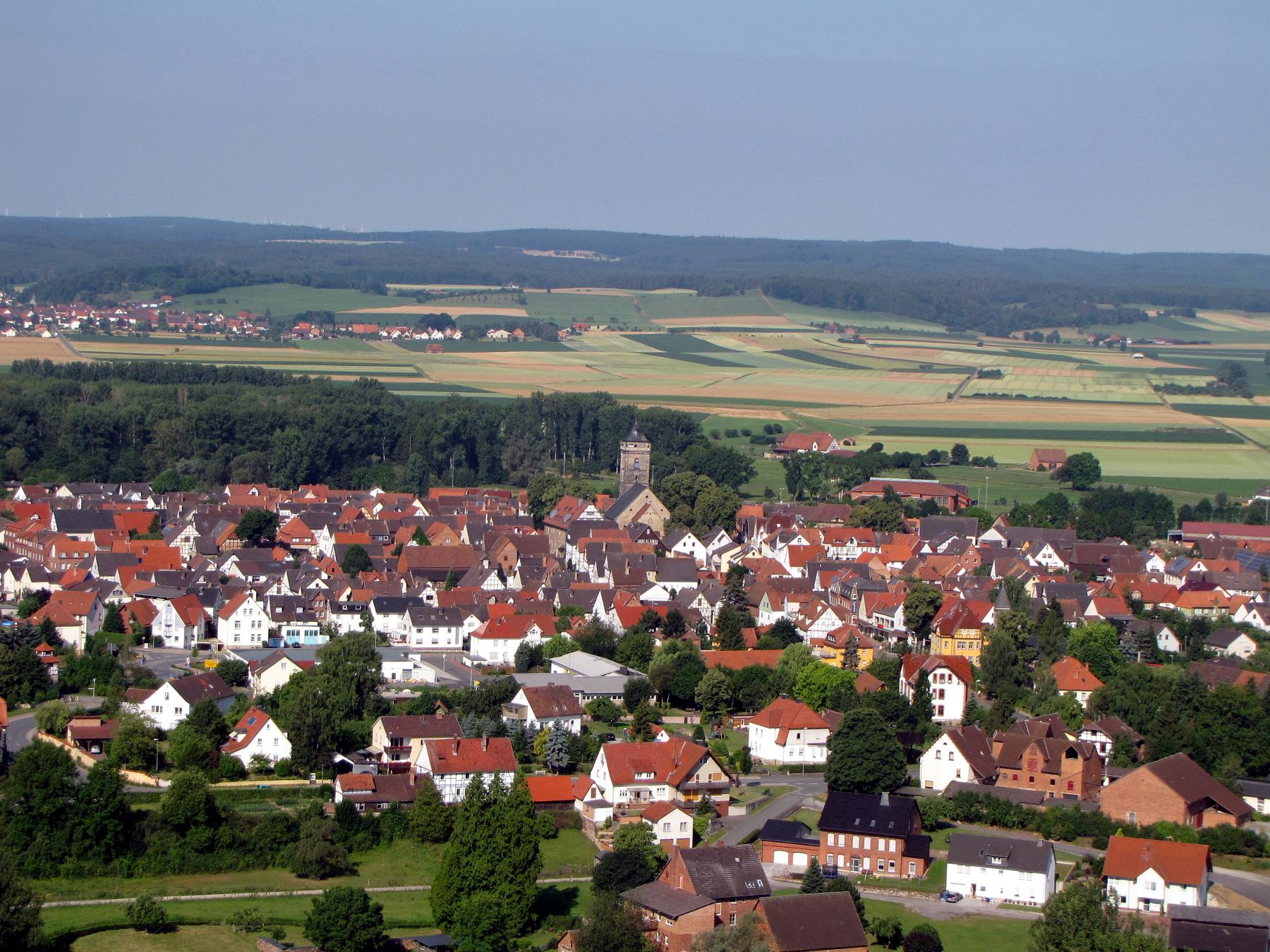
- July 2009 view from the castle Kugelsburg on the town Volkmarsen

- Coat of arms

- Location of Volkmarsen within Waldeck-Frankenberg district
- Interactive map of Volkmarsen
- Location within Germany Location within Hesse
- Coordinates: 51°23′N 9°7′E
- Country: Germany
- State: Hesse
- Admin. region: Kassel
- District: Waldeck-Frankenberg
- Subdivisions: 5 Ortsteile

Government
  - Mayor (2022–28): Hendrik Vahle

Area
  - Total: 67.47 km^{2} (26.05 sq mi)
- Elevation: 259 m (850 ft)

Population (2025-12-31)
  - Total: 6,442
  - Density: 95.48/km^{2} (247.3/sq mi)
- Time zone: UTC+01:00 (CET)
  - Summer (DST): UTC+02:00 (CEST)
- Postal codes: 34471
- Dialling codes: 05693
- Vehicle registration: KB
- Website: www.volkmarsen.de

Volkmarsen (German pronunciation: [ˈfɔlkˌmaʁzn̩]) is a small town in Waldeck-Frankenberg district in northern Hesse, Germany. It is home to 6840 residents.

== Geography ==
=== Location ===
Volkmarsen lies on the northern edge of the Waldeck Plateau, where it flattens out into the Diemel Valley, some 28 km northwest of Kassel and 7 km northeast of Bad Arolsen.

=== Neighbouring municipalities ===
Volkmarsen borders in the north on the town of Warburg (Höxter district in North Rhine-Westphalia), in the east on the municipality of Breuna and the town of Wolfhagen (both in Kassel district), in the south and west on the town of Bad Arolsen and in the northwest on the town of Diemelstadt (both in Waldeck-Frankenberg).

=== Constituent municipalities ===
Besides the main town, which bears the same name as the whole, the town of Volkmarsen consists of the centres of Ehringen, Herbsen, Hörle, Külte and Lütersheim.

== History ==
Volkmarsen's first documentary mention came in 1155. In a safe-conduct from Pope Gregory IX in 1233, Volkmarsen was first described as a town.

On 24 February 2020, a car drove into a crowd at a carnival parade, injuring 88 people.

== Politics ==
=== Town council ===
The town council's 31 seats are apportioned thus, in accordance with municipal elections held in 2006:

CDU	13 seats
SPD	9 seats
FWG	5 seats
Greens	2 seats
FDP	2 seats

Note: FWG is a citizens' coalition.

- Elections in March 2016:
- CDU = 12 seats
- SPD = 8 seats
- FDP = 1 seats
- FW = 5 seats
- AfD = 3 seats
- Unabhängige (Independents) = 2

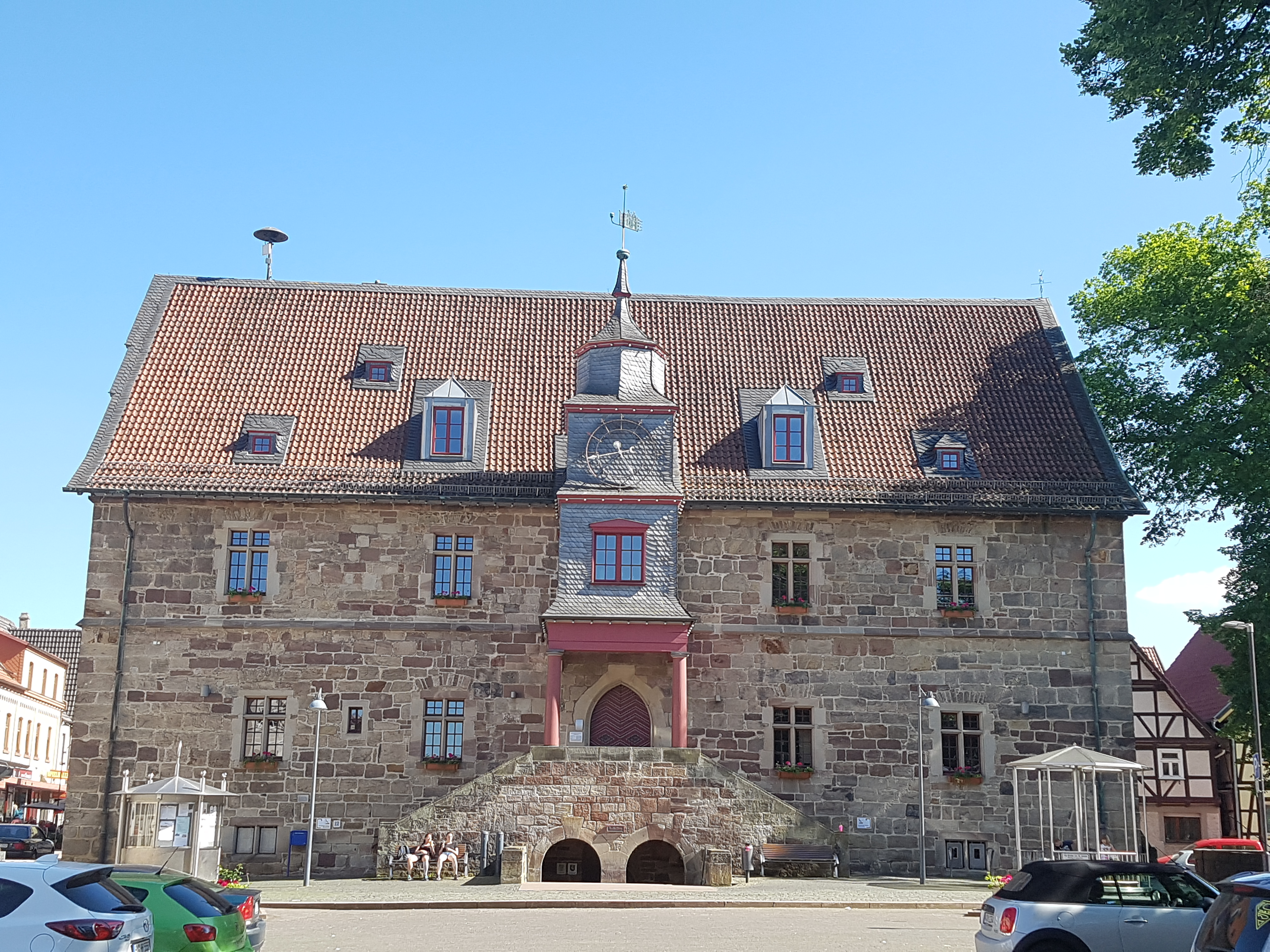
Town-Hall of Volkmarsen

=== Coat of arms ===
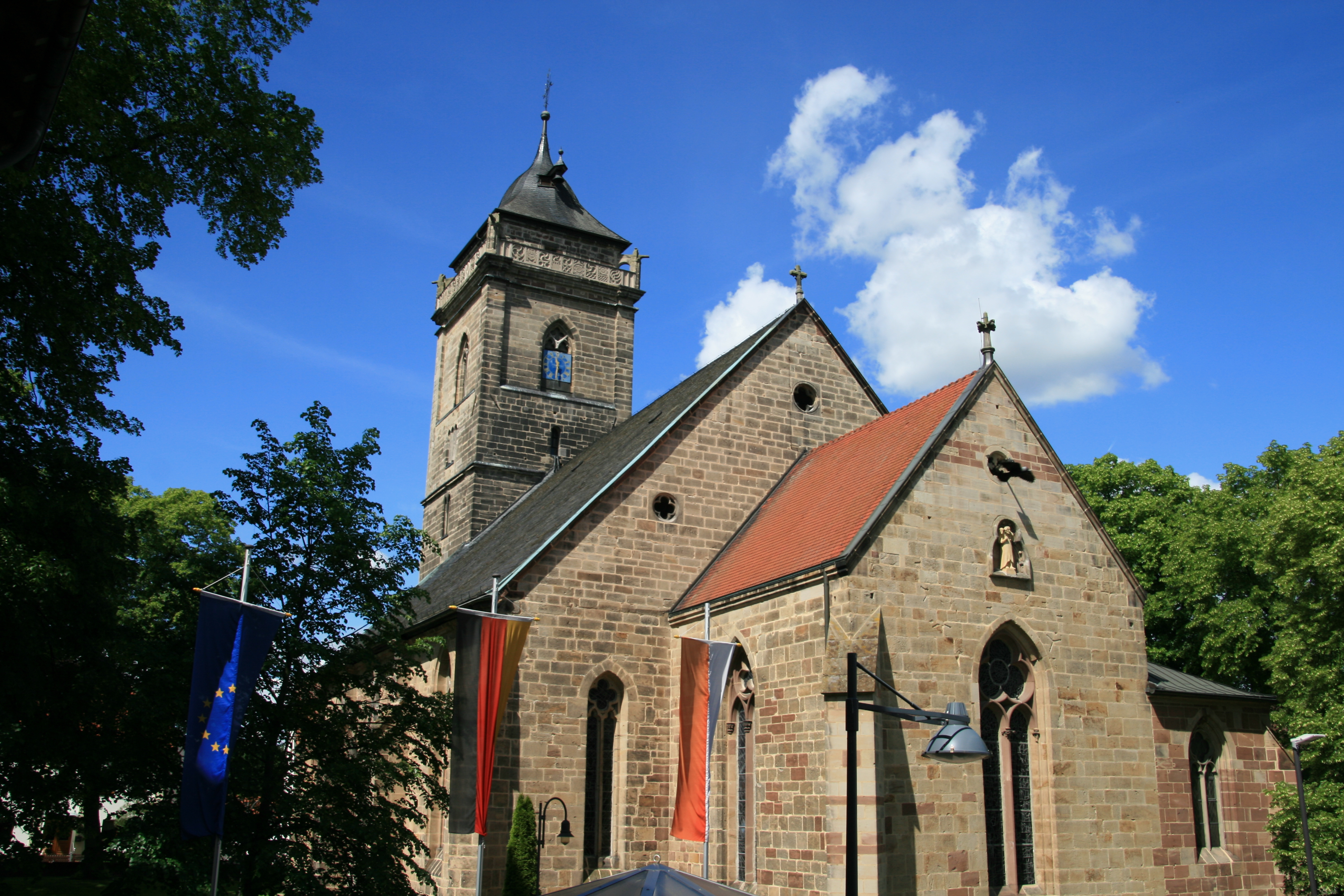
catholic Church St. Mary

Volkmarsen's oldest seal dates from 1272. Like the current coat of arms, it shows two men, but sitting on a bench, the Count of Everstein and the Abbot of Corvey, the town's two overlords at the time. Another seal from the mid 14th century shows the now familiar church with two windows with religious figures in each one, believed to have been the Archbishop of Cologne and once again the Abbot of Corvey, reflecting the new ruling arrangement over the town. The two figures in the arms nowadays, however, are Saint Peter (holding the key) and Saint Paul (holding the sword). This became the arms in the 19th century.

=== Town partnerships ===
Volkmarsen maintains partnership links with the following:

- (Germany) Buttelstedt, Thuringia since 1990

== Culture and sightseeing ==
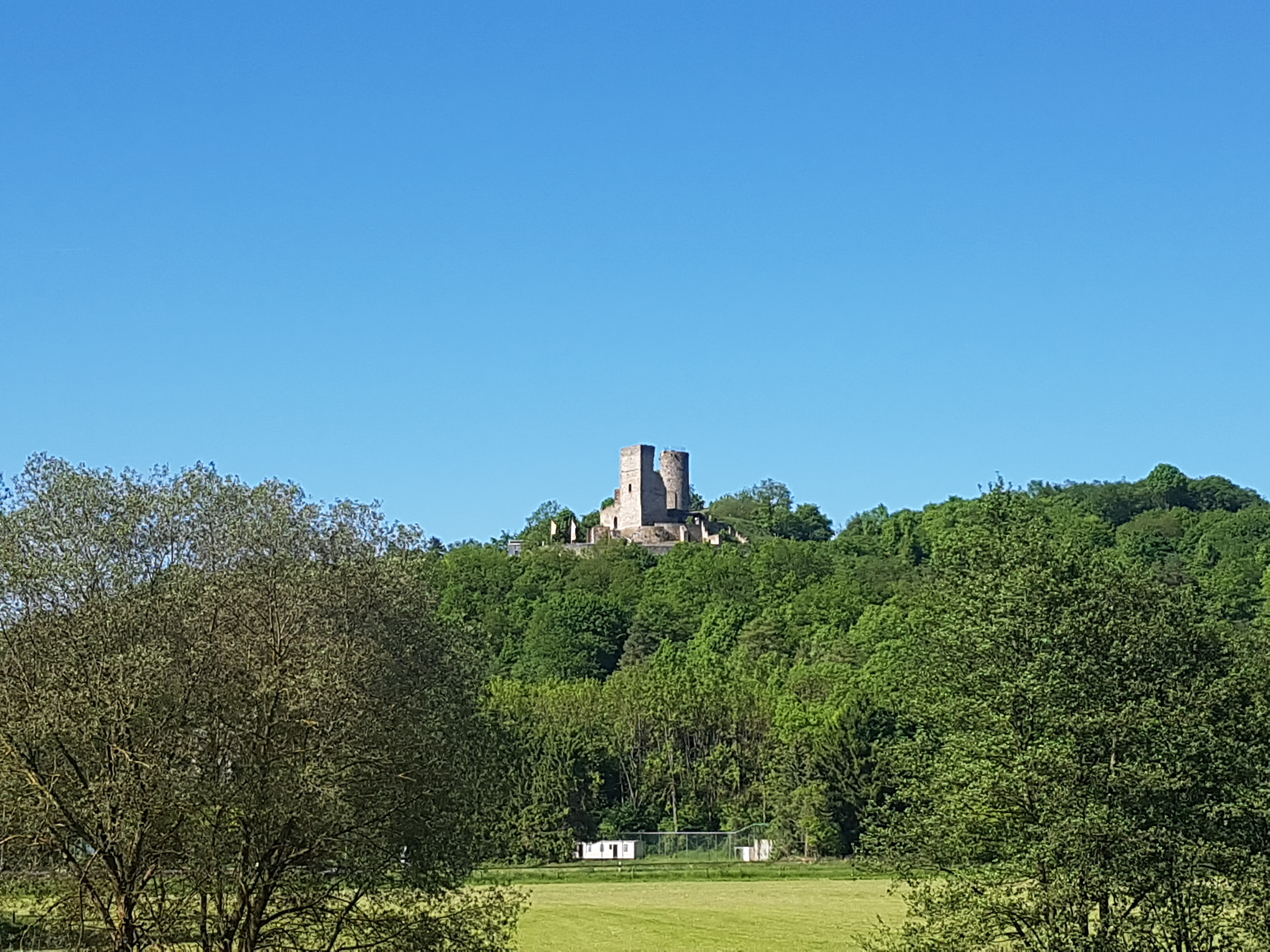
Kugelsburg-Castle

=== Buildings ===
- The castle Kugelsburg, built about 1200, destroyed in the Seven Years' War.
- Catholic Church St. Mary (built 1260)
- Lutheran Church (built 1845-1848)
- Memorial Wall at the Jewish Cemetery
- St. Elisabeth-Hospital

== Economy and infrastructure ==
=== Transport ===
Volkmarsen lies on Autobahn A44 Dortmund – Kassel and on the Warburg-Sarnau railway and offers hourly connections to Kassel.

=== Established businesses ===
- Henkelmann - genuine Waldeck sausage specialities
- Phönix Armaturen-Werke Bregel GmbH
- Semtek - lighting, show technology, set-up rental
- Teich Beratung Seele - Teichservice und Reinigung
- Volkmarsen fire brigade

== Personalities ==
=== Sons and daughters of the city ===
- Katja Eichinger (* 1971), journalist and author, widow of Bernd Eichinger

=== Other personalities associated with the city ===
- Hans Schäfer (* 1927), World champion 1954 in Bern, played a season 1947/48 with the VfR Volkmarsen
