= Wolrad IV of Waldeck-Eisenberg =

German count (1588–1640)

Wolrad IV, Count of Waldeck-Eisenberg

Count of Waldeck-Eisenberg
- Coat of arms
- Reign: 1588–1640
- Predecessor: Josias I
- Successor: Philip Theodor
- Full name: Wolrad IV Count of Waldeck-Eisenberg
- Native name: Wolrad IV Graf von Waldeck-Eisenberg
- Born: 7 July 1588; Eisenberg Castle
- Baptised: 4 August 1588; Eisenberg Castle
- Died: 6 October 1640 (aged 52); Arolsen
- Buried: St. Kilian Church, Korbach
- Noble family: House of Waldeck
- Spouse: Anne of Baden-Hochberg
- Issue Detail: Mary Elisabeth; Philip Theodor; John Louis; George Frederick; James; Wolrad V
- Father: Josias I of Waldeck-Eisenberg
- Mother: Mary of Barby and Mühlingen

Count Wolrad IV 'the Pious' of Waldeck-Eisenberg (7 July 1588 – 6 October 1640), German: Wolrad IV. 'der Fromme' Graf von Waldeck-Eisenberg, official titles: Graf zu Waldeck und Pyrmont, was since 1588 Count of Waldeck-Eisenberg. He founded of the new line of Waldeck-Eisenberg.

Never before was the independence of the County of Waldeck more threatened by Hesse than during the reign of Count Wolrad IV. Together with his elder brother Christian, however, he later successfully continued the sovereignty-oriented territorial policy of their father Josias I. They made use of the legal possibilities and chose during the for Waldeck disastrous Thirty Years' War the for them favourable side of Sweden. However, neither count lived to see the end of the war and with it the conflict with Hesse.

== Biography ==
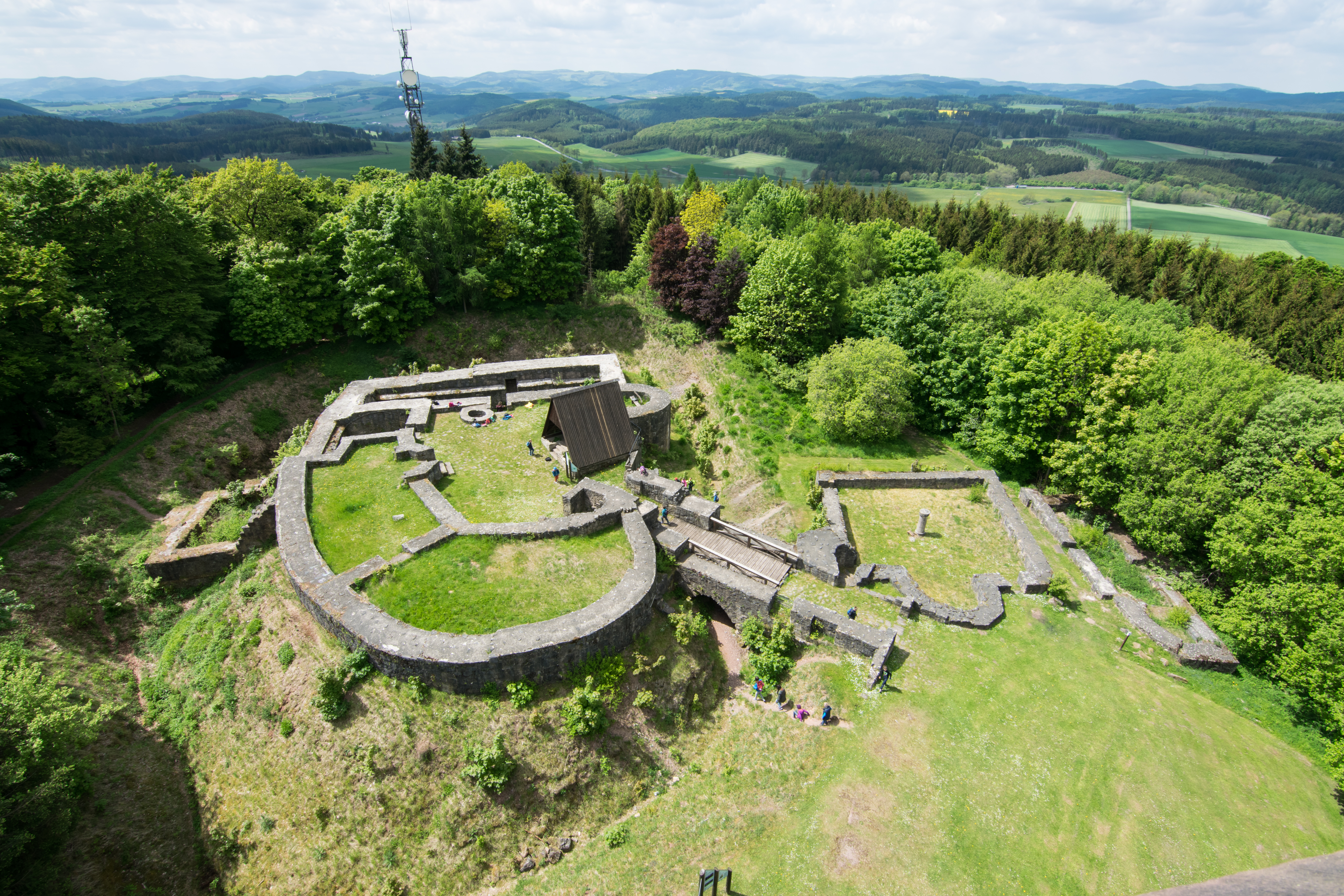
The ruins of Eisenberg Castle, 2015.

Wolrad was born at Eisenberg Castle on 7 July 1588 as the second son of Count Josias I of Waldeck-Eisenberg and Countess Mary of Barby and Mühlingen. He was baptised at Eisenberg Castle on 4 August. Two days later, on 6 August, his father died suddenly and unexpectedly there, where the guests for the baptism of Wolrad were still staying. Because Wolrad and his elder brother Christian were still minors, they were under the custody and regency of their mother and Count Francis III of Waldeck-Landau. The reforms started by their father were not continued, to the advantage of the estates of the realm, which had come under pressure. The other cadet branches of the House of Waldeck became extinct shortly after each other. Count William Ernest of Waldeck-Wildungen died young on 16 September 1598 of dysentery. With Count Francis III of Waldeck-Landau, who had opposed Hesse like no other before him, the cadet branch Waldeck-Landau also became extinct on 12 March 1597. As he had no descendants, Francis III bequeathed his share of the County of Waldeck by will and testament to the children of Count Josias I.

At a young age Wolrad and Christian witnessed how the hitherto dormant conflict over the sovereignty over the County of Waldeck developed from 1604 – the year in which Christian took over the government – into an open and later belligerent dispute which was dramatic for Waldeck. After the death of Landgrave Louis IV of Hesse-Marburg, his cousin Maurice of Hesse-Kassel inherited part of the land. Although a change of religion was excluded by the will and testament and the Peace of Augsburg did not allow it, territorial lord Maurice, who converted to Calvinism in 1605, introduced the Reformed confession and exerted both political and religious pressure on Waldeck. Wolrad and Christian responded by making Lutheranism the religion for the entire county.

Wolrad came of age in 1607. In that same year the County of Waldeck was divided up again. For although Wolrad and Christian clearly acted jointly in government, they are said to have quarrelled regularly. Wolrad got the northern part, with the cities of Arolsen and Rhoden and Christian obtained Wildungen, Waldeck, Landau and Wetterburg. They jointly owned the city of Korbach.

From the beginning of their reigns in 1607 and 1604 respectively, Wolrad and Christian followed their father's policy entirely. After the long years of regency and thus the lack of an active policy adapted to the needs of the time, this would turn out to be very unpleasant for the young counts. Due to the long period of political stagnation, the now revived attempts to reorganise the country internally and at the same time the limitation of the feudal rights externally acted as a sharp caesura for the County of Waldeck.

Both counts had their imperial immediacy confirmed shortly after Matthias' coronation as Emperor on 20 January 1612, at which Christian was present. But this did not secure the county's sovereignty. The long absence of a strong territorial policy in the whole country led after 1607, when Christian and Wolrad tried to bring the County of Waldeck back in line with 'modern' developments, to such a large number of serious conflicts, that from 1614 onwards one can clearly speak of a deep governmental crisis. The number of sessions of the Landtag since then alone is proof of the tensions that existed in the county. But even more worrying was the external pressure that had been exerted on the county and its rulers by the completely unpredictable Landgrave Maurice, since the attack on the border town Freienhagen in 1615. From the increasing dangers from outside Wolrad and Christian drew the consequence that in the same year they sought to join the Wetterauer Grafenverein, in which smaller states united against Hesse and to which the Counts of Waldeck had already sought support during the time of Count Phillip II of Waldeck-Eisenberg. Furthermore, they did everything possible to introduce the defence measures, that had been implemented in the neighbouring counties, in Waldeck too. In view of Waldeck's feudal links with Hesse, Landgrave Maurice considered joining to be impossible. But Christian, through his marriage to Elisabeth, daughter of Count John VII 'the Middle' of Nassau-Siegen, had the counts of the Wetterauer Grafenverein on his side, even though Maurice was a son-in-law of John VII 'the Middle' too. But it was not until the attempts of Wolrad and Christian to gain dominion over the city of Korbach that provoked Landgrave Maurice to such an extent that he invaded and occupied the country.

Apart from the landgraviate of Hesse-Kassel, Christian and Wolrad also had disputes with the city of Korbach, the main domestic opposition. From 1610 onwards Wolrad and Christian had continued their father's efforts to control the largest and most influential city in the county. The controversial question of the highest jurisdiction in Waldeck, which the counts had answered in their favour, led initially to the Reichskammergericht. The judicial mills grinded slowly. A deduction drafted and published in 1619 by chancellor Zacharias Viëtor, which once again emphasised Waldeck's imperial immediacy, shows how dangerous the situation was for the independence of the County of Waldeck. In the summer of 1620 (Note: Menk (1992), p. 14 dates the start of the occupation in November 1621.) the situation had become so intense that Landgrave Maurice occupied the county – with the exception of Waldeck Castle and Arolsen. The county was to be annexed by Hesse. Waldeck was in danger of losing its independence more than ever before. The two Counts of Waldeck did not give up. The Wetterauer Grafenverein had sent soldiers to Waldeck, who were trapped in the castle together with Count John VII 'the Middle'. While Wolrad won Prince Maurice of Orange, one of the most successful military commanders of the time, as an ally and thus dragged the Dutch Republic into the conflict, Christian tried to win over Emperor Ferdinand II, whose life Christian had saved during a hunt. The policy of Landgrave Maurice did not go unnoticed in the Holy Roman Empire, despite the fact that the Bohemian-Palatinate War was of greater importance. Under pressure from the Emperor and others and threats of disadvantages, the landgrave ended the occupation of Waldeck in the summer of 1621. (Note: Menk (1992), p. 14 dates the end of the occupation in 1622.)

After the acute threat to the county had been averted, Wolrad and Christian did not give up and tried, through the Reichskammergericht and the Reichshofrat, to get legally closer to their goal. Moreover, they demanded compensation for the damage that the soldiers of the Hessian landgrave had caused in Waldeck during the occupation. After lengthy negotiations, Emperor Ferdinand II obliged Landgrave Maurice in 1630 to pay. The negotiations ended in a settlement in Kassel in 1632. The subjugation of Korbach in February 1624, where a commissioner of the counts was appointed by treaty, thus eliminating the economic power that was still the strongest competitor in the county, contributed to a certain relaxation of the situation in the county.

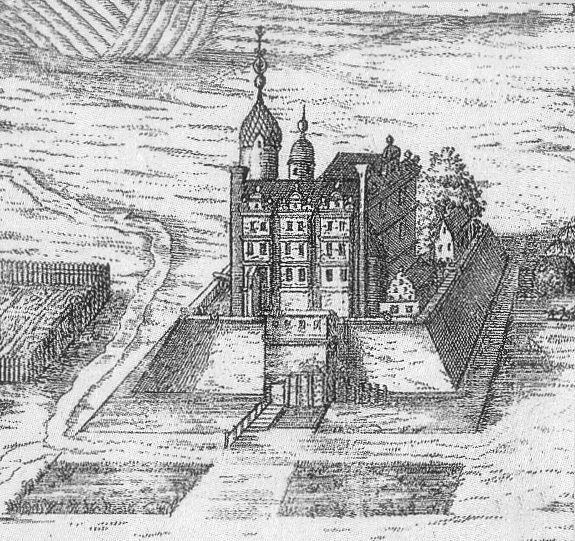
Copper engraving of Pyrmont Castle from 1698, presumably in the state before the Thirty Years' War.

Even territorial gains were made in what were difficult times. The County of Pyrmont became part of Waldeck. After the death of Count Philip Ernest of Gleichen on 18 November 1619, his younger brother Hans Louis ruled in Pyrmont. When it became clear that he would have no descendants, he signed a succession treaty with his relatives Wolrad and Christian from Waldeck and ceded the County of Pyrmont to them in 1625. Hans Louis died on 15 January 1631. Wolrad and Christian took the title of Count of Pyrmont in early 1630.

In contrast to the favourable developments for the counts, there were the devastating consequences of the Thirty Years' War. The acquisition of the County of Pyrmont, which lies almost 90 kilometres north of the County of Waldeck, proved to be difficult, because, as in previous years, the Prince-Bishopric of Paderborn laid claim to it. Prince-bishop Ferdinand I had the county occupied in 1629 and besieged Pyrmont Castle, forcing its surrender after ten months. However, in 1631 Christian met King Gustavus II Adolphus of Sweden, changed sides during the war and secured the county's support from the great power. After Sweden's victory over the imperial forces in June 1633 at the Battle of Oldendorf, Pyrmont was also taken a short time later and returned to Sweden's ally Waldeck.

However, Waldeck's ties to Sweden could not prevent hardship and misery. Troops passing through almost bled the County of Waldeck dry. Moreover, in the middle of the 1630s the plague broke out. Imperial troops retook possession of Pyrmont Castle on 26 September 1636. Wolrad and Christian did not live to see the recapture. Wolrad died in Arolsen on 6 October 1640, and was succeeded by his eldest surviving son Philip Theodor.

== Marriage and issue ==
Wolrad married in Durlach on 8 September 1607 to Margravine Anne of Baden-Hochberg (Hochberg, 13 November 1587 – 11 March 1649), daughter of Margrave James III of Baden-Hochberg and Countess Elisabeth of Culemborg.

From the marriage of Wolrad and Anne the following children were born:

1. Mary Elisabeth (Eisenberg Castle, 2 September 1608 – Basel, 19 February 1643), was since 2 October 1620 Stiftsfrau in Gandersheim Abbey, became deaconess on 30 March 1626. Was since 1623 also Abbess of Schaaken Abbey. Married at Karlsburg Castle on 12 January 1634 to Margrave Frederick V of Baden-Durlach (Sulzburg, 6 July 1594 – Karlsburg Castle, 8 September 1659).
2. Josias Floris (Arolsen, 23 juli 1612 – Eilhausen, 1 February 1613).
3. Count Philip Theodor (2 November 1614 – Korbach, 7 December 1645), succeeded his father in 1640. Married in Culemborg on 25 August 1639 to Countess Mary Magdalene of Nassau-Siegen (Siegen Castle, 21 October 1622 (Note: "Born on the 26th in Europäische Stammtafeln and Dek (1970), but a notification of birth, dated Siegen 1-11-1622, says: «jüngsthin den 21. abgelaufenen Monats 8bris». The place of birth must therefore be Siegen, where the parents lived until 1625 (see Menk (1967)). The inscription on the coffin reads: «nata XX Octobris MDCXXII ad fontes spadanos» (i.e. Spa, sic!). See Leiss (1928), p. 108.") – Spa, 20/30 August 1647 (Note: "See State Archives Wiesbaden (130^{II} 7826), notification of death, Spa 20/30‑8‑1647: «heut früe umb halbvier Uhr, alhir zu Spa».")).
4. John Louis (Arolsen, 20 November 1616 – near Wouw, 17 July 1638), served in the Dutch States Army.
5. Fürst George Frederick (Arolsen, 31 January 1620^{Jul.} – Arolsen, 9 November 1692^{Jul.}), succeeded his nephew Henry Wolrad in 1664, was elevated to Reichsfürst in 1682. Married in Culemborg on 29 November/9 December 1643 (Note: "See State Archives Wiesbaden (170^{III}), invitation from Culemborg 24-11-1643 for the wedding that will be celebrated «nächtskommenden Mittwoch den 29 November alten Kalenders auf meinem Hause». See the princely archives in Schloss Wittgenstein, F. 320 III, notification dated Culemborg 4-12-1643: «am verschienen Mittwoch 29. Novemberbris».") to Countess Elisabeth Charlotte of Nassau-Siegen (Emmerich, 11 March 1626 (Note: "Born on 11-2-1626 at Europäische Stammtafeln I, 117; on 8-2-1626 at Europäische Stammtafeln I, 139 and on 11-3-1626 at Dek (1970). The latter date is confirmed by a notification preserved in the State Archives Marburg (115, Waldeck, 2) and dated Emmerik 12-3-1626: «gestriges tagks umb zwo Uhren vormittags».") – Culemborg, 16 November 1694^{Jul.} (Note: "See State Archives Wiesbaden (130^{II} 2183): notification of death «allhier den 16. dieses früh morgens zwischen 3 und 4 Uhr». The notification is dated Culemborg, unfortunately the date of dispatch is difficult to read: 10/20 or 18/28, making it impossible to establish the style of the death date with certainty. Hoffmeister (1883) wrongly claims it is the new style. There is in fact another notification (kept in the State Archives Karlsruhe Abt. 47 Nr. 1410) dated Culemborg 18-11 and stating that the Fürstin died «den 16/26 dieses früh morgens zw. 3 u. 4 Uhr». Therefore, it is 16 o.s.")).
6. James (Arolsen, 2 May 1621 – near Walbeck, 3 June 1645), served in the Dutch States Army.
7. Christian (Arolsen, 17 March 1623 – Arolsen, 21 October 1623).
8. Anne Juliane (Arolsen, 15 January 1624 – Arolsen, 20 August 1624).
9. Wolrad V (Arolsen, 25 November 1625 – Bartenstein, 29 January 1657), was major general in the army of Brandenburg.
10. Charlotte (Arolsen, 4 February 1629 – Arolsen, 3 July 1629).

== Ancestors ==
Ancestors of Count Wolrad IV of Waldeck-Eisenberg
Great-great-grandparents	Philip II of Waldeck-Eisenberg (1452/53–1524) ⚭ 1481; Catherine of Solms-Lich (?–1492)	Otto IV of Hoya (1425–1497) ⚭ Anne of Lippe (1452–1533)	Günther XXXIX of Schwarzburg-Blankenburg (1455–1531) ⚭ 1493; Amelia of Mansfeld (?–1517)	William VI of Henneberg-Schleusingen (1478–1559) ⚭ Anastasia of Brandenburg (1478–1557)	Burchard of Barby and Mühlingen (1454–1505) ⚭ 1482; Magdalene of Mecklenburg (?–1532)	Gebhard VII of Mansfeld-Hinterort (1478–1558) ⚭ 1510; Margaretha of Gleichen (ca. 1495–1567)	Ernest of Anhalt-Zerbst (?–1516) ⚭ 1494; Margaret of Münsterberg (1473–1530)	Joachim I Nestor of Brandenburg (1484–1535) ⚭ 1502; Elisabeth of Denmark (1485–1555)
Great-grandparents	Philip III of Waldeck-Eisenberg (1486–1539) ⚭ 1503; Adelaide of Hoya (1475–1513)		Henry XXXII of Schwarzburg-Blankenburg (1499–1538) ⚭ 1524; Catherine of Henneberg-Schleusingen (1508–1567)		Wolfgang of Barby and Mühlingen (1502–1564) ⚭ 1526; Agnes of Mansfeld-Hinterort (1511–1558)		John II of Anhalt-Zerbst (1504–1551) ⚭ 1534; Margaret of Brandenburg (1511–1577)	
Grandparents	Wolrad II of Waldeck-Eisenberg (1509–1578) ⚭ 1546; Anastasia Günthera of Schwarzburg-Blankenburg (1526–1570)				Albrecht X of Barby and Mühlingen (1534–1588) ⚭ 1559; Mary of Anhalt-Zerbst (1538–1563)			
Parents	Josias I of Waldeck-Eisenberg (1554–1588) ⚭ 1582; Mary of Barby and Mühlingen (1563–1619)							

== Literature ==
- Varnhagen, Johann Adolf Theodor Ludwig (1853). Grundlage der Waldeckischen Landes- und Regentengeschichte (in German). Vol. Zweiter Band. Arolsen: Verlag der Speyer'schen Buchhandlung.

== Sources ==
- Behr, Kamill (1854). Genealogie der in Europa regierenden Fürstenhäuser (in German). Leipzig: Verlag von Bernhard Tauchnitz.
- Curtze, L. (1850). Geschichte und Beschreibung des Fürstenthums Waldeck. Ein Handbuch für Vaterlandsfreunde (in German). Arolsen: Speyer'sche Buchhandlung. pp. 611 ff.
- Dek, A.W.E. (1968). "De afstammelingen van Juliana van Stolberg tot aan het jaar van de Vrede van Münster". Spiegel der Historie. Maandblad voor de geschiedenis der Nederlanden (in Dutch). 1968 (7/8): 228–303.
- Dek, A.W.E. (1970). Genealogie van het Vorstenhuis Nassau (in Dutch). Zaltbommel: Europese Bibliotheek.
- von Ehrenkrook, Hans Friedrich; Förster, Karl & Marchtaler, Kurt Erhard (1928). Ahnenreihen aus allen deutschen Gauen. Beilage zum Archiv für Sippenforschung und allen verwandten Gebieten (in German). Görlitz: Verlag für Sippenforschung und Wappenkunde C.A. Starke.
- Haarmann, Torsten (2014). Das Haus Waldeck und Pyrmont. Mehr als 900 Jahre Gesamtgeschichte mit Stammfolge. Deutsche Fürstenhäuser (in German). Vol. Heft 35. Werl: Börde-Verlag. ISBN 978-3-981-4458-2-4.
- Hoffmeister, Jacob Christoph Carl (1883). Historisch-genealogisches Handbuch über alle Grafen und Fürsten von Waldeck und Pyrmont seit 1228 (in German). Cassel: Verlag Gustav Klaunig.
- Huberty, Michel; Giraud, Alain & Magdelaine, F. & B. (1981). l'Allemagne Dynastique (in French). Vol. Tome III: Brunswick-Nassau-Schwarzbourg. Le Perreux: Alain Giraud.
- Huberty, Michel; Giraud, Alain & Magdelaine, F. & B. (1987). l'Allemagne Dynastique (in French). Vol. Tome V: Hohenzollern-Waldeck-Familles alliées A-B. Le Perreux-sur-Marne: Alain Giraud.
- Leiss, Albert (1928). "Die gräflich und fürstlich waldeckischen Begräbnisstätten zu Corbach". Geschichtsblätter für Waldeck und Pyrmont (in German). Vol. Band XXV. pp. 98–114.
- Menk, Friedhelm (1967). "Wilhelm Graf zu Nassau-Siegen (1592–1642)". Siegerland (in German). Band XLIV (Heft 2): 53–59.
- Menk, Gerhard (1992). Georg Friedrich von Waldeck 1620–1692. Eine biographische Skizze. Waldeckische Historische Hefte (in German). Vol. Band 3. Arolsen: Waldeckischer Geschichtsverein e.V. ISBN 3-9802226-5-9.
- Wackie Eysten, J. (1914). "Waldeck, George Friedrich". In Molhuysen, P.C. & Blok, P.J. (eds.). Nieuw Nederlandsch Biografisch Woordenboek (in Dutch). Vol. Derde deel. Leiden: A.W. Sijthoff. pp. 1377–1378.
- Wurzbach, Constant von (1885). "Christian Graf Waldeck". Biographisches Lexikon des Kaiserthums Oesterreich, enthaltend die Lebenskizzen der denkwürdigen Personen, welche seit 1750 in de österreichischen Kronländern geboren wurden oder darin gelebt und gewirkt haben (in German). Vol. Zweiundfünfzigster Theil. Wien: Verlag der k.k. Hof- und Staatsdruckerei. p. 172.

Wolrad IV of Waldeck-Eisenberg House of Waldeck Born: 7 July 1588 Died: 6 October 1640
Preceded by Josias I	Count of Waldeck-Eisenberg; 1588–1640	Succeeded by Philip Theodor
Preceded by Hans Louis of Gleichen	Count of Pyrmont; 1625–1640	Succeeded by Philip Theodor of Waldeck-Eisenberg
