= Christian, Count of Waldeck-Wildungen =

German count (1585–1637)

Count of Waldeck-Eisenberg (until 1607) Count of Waldeck-Wildungen (since 1607)
- Coat of arms
- Reign: 1588–1637
- Predecessor: Josias I of Waldeck-Eisenberg
- Successor: Philip VII of Waldeck-Wildungen; John II of Waldeck-Landau
- Full name: Christian Count of Waldeck-Wildungen
- Native name: Christian Graf von Waldeck-Wildungen
- Born: Christian Graf von Waldeck-Eisenberg; 24/25 December 1585; Eisenberg Castle
- Died: 31 December 1637; Waldeck Castle
- Buried: Marienthal Abbey, Netze (now part of Waldeck)
- Noble family: House of Waldeck
- Spouse: Elisabeth of Nassau-Siegen
- Issue Detail: Philip VII of Waldeck-Wildungen; John II of Waldeck-Landau
- Father: Josias I of Waldeck-Eisenberg
- Mother: Mary of Barby and Mühlingen

Count Christian of Waldeck-Wildungen (24/25 December 1585 – 31 December 1637), German: Christian Graf von Waldeck-Wildungen, official titles: Graf zu Waldeck und Pyrmont, was since 1588 Count of Waldeck-Eisenberg and after the division with his brother in 1607 Count of Waldeck-Wildungen. He founded the new cadet branch of Waldeck-Wildungen and is the progenitor of the princes of Waldeck and Pyrmont.

Never before was the independence of the County of Waldeck more threatened by Hesse than during the reign of Count Christian. Together with his younger brother Wolrad IV, however, he later successfully continued the sovereignty-oriented territorial policy of their father Josias I. They made use of the legal possibilities and chose during the for Waldeck disastrous Thirty Years' War the for them favourable side of Sweden. However, neither count lived to see the end of the war and with it the conflict with Hesse.

== Biography ==
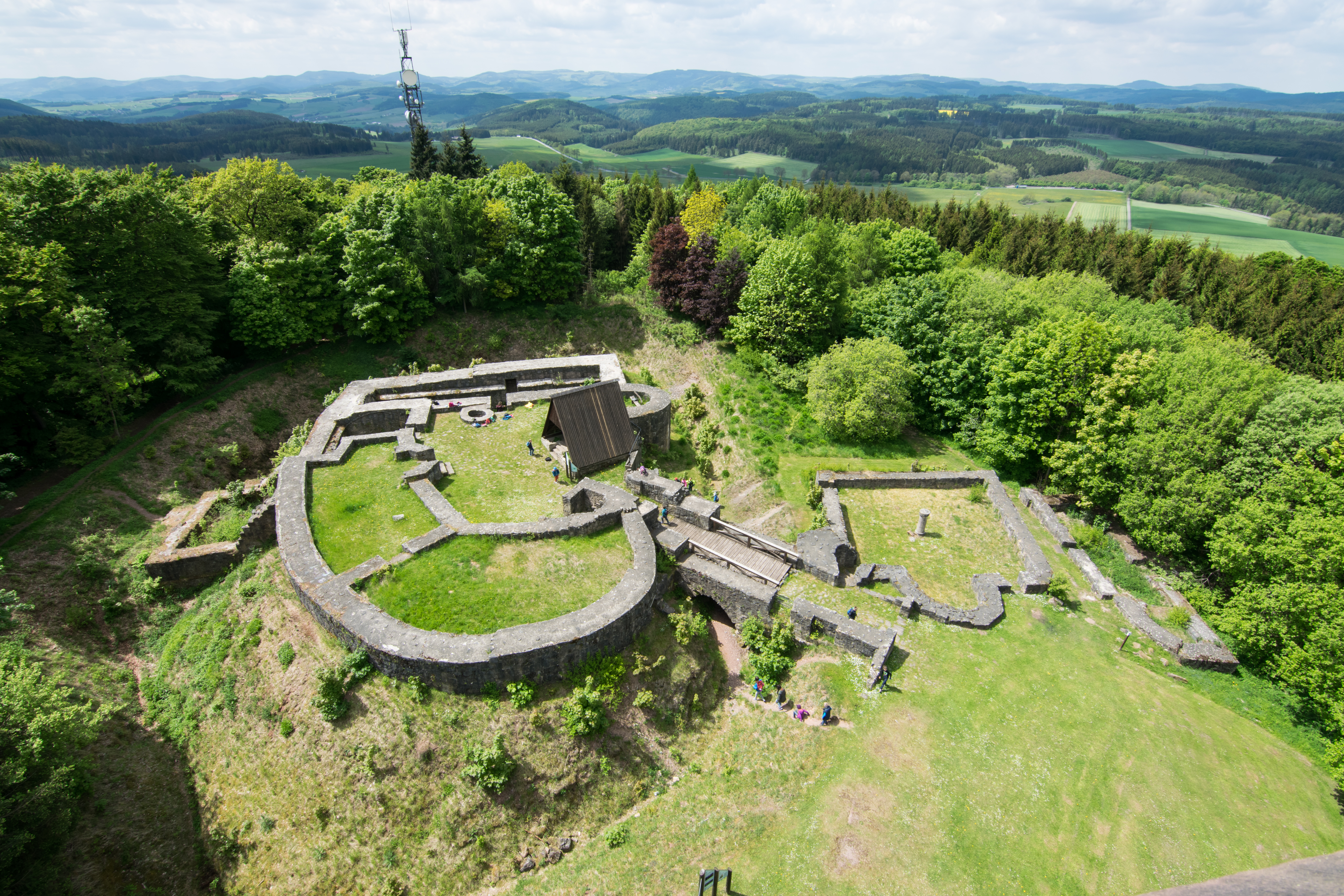
The ruins of Eisenberg Castle, 2015.

Christian was born at Eisenberg Castle on 24/25 December 1585, (Note: Hoffmeister (1883), p. 58 states that he was born on 25 December 1585 on Christmas Eve, between 12 am and 1 am (i.e. on the 25th, not on 24 December).) the eldest son of Count Josias I of Waldeck-Eisenberg and Countess Mary of Barby and Mühlingen. When Josias I died suddenly and unexpectedly at Eisenberg Castle on 6 August 1588, where the guests for the baptism of his fourth child Wolrad were still staying, Christian and Wolrad were still minors. The reforms started by their father were not continued, to the advantage of the estates of the realm, which had come under pressure. The two young counts were under the custody and regency of their mother and Count Francis III of Waldeck-Landau. The other cadet branches of the House of Waldeck became extinct shortly after each other. Count William Ernest of Waldeck-Wildungen died young on 16 September 1598 of dysentery. With Count Francis III of Waldeck-Landau, who had opposed Hesse like no other before him, the cadet branch Waldeck-Landau also became extinct on 12 March 1597. As he had no descendants, Francis III bequeathed his share of the County of Waldeck by will and testament to the children of Count Josias I.

At a young age Christian and Wolrad witnessed how the hitherto dormant conflict over the sovereignty over the County of Waldeck developed from 1604 – the year in which Christian took over the government – into an open and later belligerent dispute which was dramatic for Waldeck. After the death of Landgrave Louis IV of Hesse-Marburg, his cousin Maurice of Hesse-Kassel inherited part of the land. Although a change of religion was excluded by the will and testament and the Peace of Augsburg did not allow it, territorial lord Maurice, who converted to Calvinism in 1605, introduced the Reformed confession and exerted both political and religious pressure on Waldeck. Christian and Wolrad responded by making Lutheranism the religion for the entire county.

Wolrad came of age in 1607. In that same year the County of Waldeck was divided up again. For although Christian and Wolrad clearly acted jointly in government, they are said to have quarrelled regularly. Christian obtained Wildungen, Waldeck, Landau and Wetterburg together with the corresponding territories. His brother Wolrad IV got the northern part, with the cities of Arolsen and Rhoden. They jointly owned the city of Korbach.

From the beginning of their reigns in 1604 and 1607 respectively, Christian and Wolrad followed their father's policy entirely. After the long years of regency and thus the lack of an active policy adapted to the needs of the time, this would turn out to be very unpleasant for the young counts. Due to the long period of political stagnation, the now revived attempts to reorganise the country internally and at the same time the limitation of the feudal rights externally acted as a sharp caesura for the County of Waldeck.

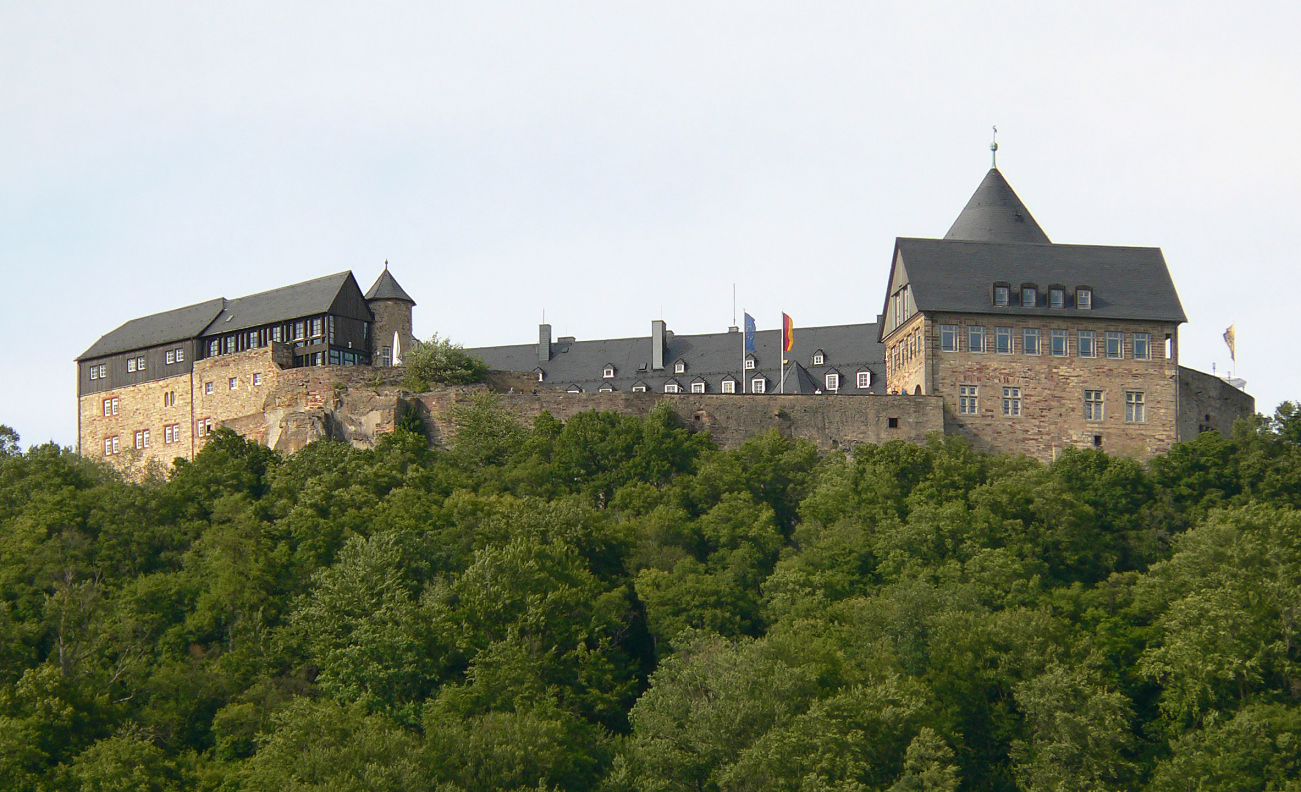
Waldeck Castle. Photo: Axel Hindemith, 2012.

Both counts had their imperial immediacy confirmed shortly after Matthias' coronation as Emperor on 20 January 1612, at which Christian was present. But this did not secure the county's sovereignty. The long absence of a strong territorial policy in the whole country led after 1607, when Christian and Wolrad tried to bring the County of Waldeck back in line with 'modern' developments, to such a large number of serious conflicts, that from 1614 onwards one can clearly speak of a deep governmental crisis. The number of sessions of the Landtag since then alone is proof of the tensions that existed in the county. But even more worrying was the external pressure that had been exerted on the county and its rulers by the completely unpredictable Landgrave Maurice, since the attack on the border town Freienhagen in 1615. From the increasing dangers from outside Christian and Wolrad drew the consequence that in the same year they sought to join the Wetterauer Grafenverein, in which smaller states united against Hesse and to which the Counts of Waldeck had already sought support during the time of Count Phillip II of Waldeck-Eisenberg. Furthermore, they did everything possible to introduce the defence measures, that had been implemented in the neighbouring counties, in Waldeck too. In view of Waldeck's feudal links with Hesse, Landgrave Maurice considered joining to be impossible. But Christian, through his marriage to Elisabeth, daughter of Count John VII 'the Middle' of Nassau-Siegen, had the counts of the Wetterauer Grafenverein on his side, even though Maurice was a son-in-law of John VII 'the Middle' too. But it was not until the attempts of Christian and Wolrad IV to gain dominion over the city of Korbach that provoked Landgrave Maurice to such an extent that he invaded and occupied the country.

Apart from the landgraviate of Hesse-Kassel, Christian and Wolrad also had disputes with the city of Korbach, the main domestic opposition. From 1610 onwards Christian and Wolrad had continued their father's efforts to control the largest and most influential city in the county. The controversial question of the highest jurisdiction in Waldeck, which the counts had answered in their favour, led initially to the Reichskammergericht. The judicial mills grinded slowly. A deduction drafted and published in 1619 by chancellor Zacharias Viëtor, which once again emphasised Waldeck's imperial immediacy, shows how dangerous the situation was for the independence of the County of Waldeck. In the summer of 1620 (Note: Menk (1992), p. 14 dates the start of the occupation in November 1621.) the situation had become so intense that Landgrave Maurice occupied the county – with the exception of Waldeck Castle and Arolsen. The county was to be annexed by Hesse. Waldeck was in danger of losing its independence more than ever before. The two Counts of Waldeck did not give up. The Wetterauer Grafenverein had sent soldiers to Waldeck, who were trapped in the castle together with Count John VII 'the Middle'. While Wolrad IV won Prince Maurice of Orange, one of the most successful military commanders of the time, as an ally and thus dragged the Dutch Republic into the conflict, Christian tried to win over Emperor Ferdinand II, whose life Christian had saved during a hunt. Christian was also chamberlain to the Emperor. The policy of Landgrave Maurice did not go unnoticed in the Holy Roman Empire, despite the fact that the Bohemian-Palatinate War was of greater importance. Under pressure from the Emperor and others and threats of disadvantages, the landgrave ended the occupation of Waldeck in the summer of 1621. (Note: Menk (1992), p. 14 dates the end of the occupation in 1622.)

After the acute threat to the county had been averted, Christian and Wolrad did not give up and tried, through the Reichskammergericht and the Reichshofrat, to get legally closer to their goal. Moreover, they demanded compensation for the damage that the soldiers of the Hessian landgrave had caused in Waldeck during the occupation. After lengthy negotiations, Emperor Ferdinand II obliged Landgrave Maurice in 1630 to pay. The negotiations ended in a settlement in Kassel in 1632. The subjugation of Korbach in February 1624, where a commissioner of the counts was appointed by treaty, thus eliminating the economic power that was still the strongest competitor in the county, contributed to a certain relaxation of the situation in the county.

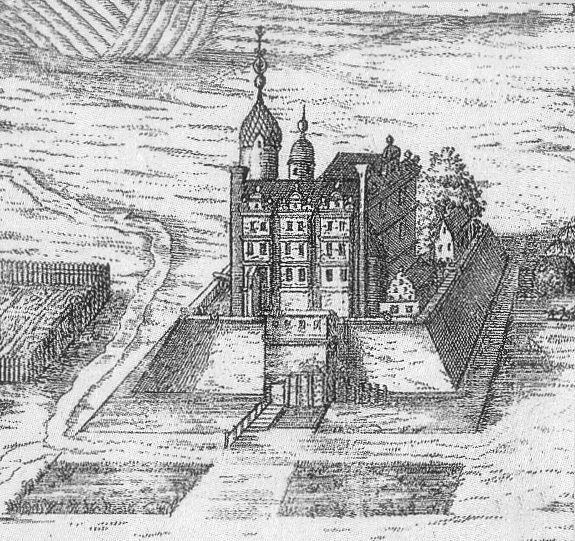
Copper engraving of Pyrmont Castle from 1698, presumably in the state before the Thirty Years' War.

Even territorial gains were made in what were difficult times. The County of Pyrmont became part of Waldeck. After the death of Count Philip Ernest of Gleichen on 18 November 1619, his younger brother Hans Louis ruled in Pyrmont. When it became clear that he would have no descendants, he signed a succession treaty with his relatives Christian and Wolrad IV from Waldeck and ceded the County of Pyrmont to them in 1625. Hans Louis died on 15 January 1631. Christian and Wolrad took the title of Count of Pyrmont in early 1630.

In contrast to the favourable developments for the counts, there were the devastating consequences of the Thirty Years' War. The acquisition of the County of Pyrmont, which lies almost 90 kilometres north of the County of Waldeck, proved to be difficult, because, as in previous years, the Prince-Bishopric of Paderborn laid claim to it. Prince-bishop Ferdinand I had the county occupied in 1629 and besieged Pyrmont Castle, forcing its surrender after ten months. However, in 1631 Christian met King Gustavus II Adolphus of Sweden, changed sides during the war and secured the county's support from the great power. After Sweden's victory over the imperial forces in June 1633 at the Battle of Oldendorf, Pyrmont was also taken a short time later and returned to Sweden's ally Waldeck.

However, Waldeck's ties to Sweden could not prevent hardship and misery. Troops passing through almost bled the County of Waldeck dry. Moreover, in the middle of the 1630s the plague broke out. Imperial troops retook possession of Pyrmont Castle on 26 September 1636. Christian did not live to see the recapture. Christian died at Waldeck Castle on 31 December 1637, and was succeeded by his son Philip VII.

== Witch Trials ==
Christian was responsible for the particularly violent series of witch trials in Wildungen, which began in 1629. Until 1632, the trials cost the lives of 29 victims, including Elisabeth Kotzenberg, the wife of Günther Samuel, who was Christian's secretary. She was tortured and died at City Hall on 3 July 1630.

He loved the arts and sciences, and was kind to all scholars. He loved the Word of God and diligently supported churches, schools and hospitals provided and promised that he would eagerly stay with the Protestant religion. But after all, he could not resist the insistence of the clergy, and in 1630 he gave the order to apply extreme measures eradicate the 'vice that is magic'

— Klettenberg, Eichler, p. 123

== Marriage and issue ==
Christian married in Wildungen in November 1604 (Note: "Wildungen 19-11-1604 in Dek (1962) (date confirmed in Europäische Stammtafeln I, 117). Wildungen 29-11-1604 (new style?) in von Ehrenkrook, et al. (1928) I, 195 and 409. Europäische Stammtafeln I, 139 on the other hand places the marriage on 18-11-1604, which is the date Hoffmeister (1883) states. However, an original copy of the latter work with handwritten notes by various archivists, which is in the State Archives Marburg, states that the following inscription about Elisabeth is on the baptismal font at Arolsen: «dicta Ao 1604 19 Novemb. et Nuptiae Wildungen celebratae».") to Countess Elisabeth of Nassau-Siegen (1584–1661) (Dillenburg Castle, 8 November 1584 – Landau, 26 July 1661), the eldest daughter of Count John VII 'the Middle' of Nassau-Siegen and his first wife Countess Magdalene of Waldeck-Wildungen.

From this marriage the following children were born:

1. Mary Magdalene (Wildungen, 27 April 1606 – Schwalenberg, 28 May 1671), married on 27 April 1623 to Count Simon VII of Lippe-Detmold (Brake Castle near Lemgo, 30 December 1587 – Detmold, 26 March 1627).
2. Sophie Juliane (Wildungen, 1 April 1607 – Ziegenhain, 15 September 1637), married in Waldeck on 31 December 1633 to her first cousin Landgrave Herman of Hesse-Rotenburg (Kassel, 15 August 1607 – Rotenburg an der Fulda, 25 March 1658).
3. Anne Augusta (Landau, 31 March 1608 – Wittgenstein, 27 May 1658), married on 30 June 1627 to Count John VIII of Sayn-Wittgenstein-Hohenstein (14 October 1601 – Cologne, 2 April 1657).
4. Elisabeth (Waldeck, 25 April 1610 – Osnabrück, 29 May 1647), married in Waldeck on 28 October 1634 to her first cousin Count William Wirich of Daun-Falkenstein (1 January 1613 – 22 August 1682).
5. Maurice (Waldeck, 15 August 1611 – Waldeck, 1 March 1617).
6. Catherine (20 October 1612 – Cologne, 24 November 1649), married:
  1. on 19 June 1631 to Count Simon Louis of Lippe-Detmold (Brake Castle near Lemgo, 14 March 1610 – Detmold, 8 August 1636).
  2. on 15 November 1641 to Duke Philip Louis of Schleswig-Holstein-Sonderburg-Wiesenburg (House Beck, 27 October 1620 – Schneeberg, 10 March 1689).
7. Count Philip VII (Eisenberg Castle, (Note: Dek (1968), pp. 260 and 275 mentions born in Wildungen.) 25 November 1613 – near Jankowitz, Bohemia, 24 February 1645), succeeded his father as Count of Waldeck-Wildungen. He married in Frankfurt on 26 October 1634 to Countess Anne Catherine of Sayn-Wittgenstein (Simmern, 27 July 1610 – Kleinern, December 1690 (Note: Haarmann (2014), p. 48 mentions died on 1 December 1650 (sic). Dek (1968), pp. 260 and 275 mentions died in Kleinern, December 1690. Hoffmeister (1883), p. 61 mentions died in December 1690.)).
8. Christine (29 December 1614 – Homburg, 7 May 1679), married in Waldeck on 1 September 1642 to Count Ernest of Sayn-Wittgenstein-Homburg (Berleburg, 29 March 1599 – Homburg, 20 March 1649).
9. Dorothy (2 February 1617 – ?), married in Falkenstein am Donnersberg on 26 November 1641 to Count Emich XIII of Leiningen-Dagsburg-Falkenburg (12 June 1612 – Speyer, 1 March 1657).
10. Agnes (1 or 2 March 1618 – Emichsburg, 29 November 1651), married on 5 February 1651 to Count John Philip III of Leiningen-Dagsburg-Emichsburg (19 February 1622 – 19 February 1666).
11. Sibylle (25 May 1619 – Hartenburg, 30 September 1678), married on 10 January 1644 to Count Frederick Emich of Leiningen-Dagsburg-Hartenburg (9 February 1621 – 26 July 1698).
12. Joanne Agathe (Waldeck, 6 June 1620 – 20 May 1638).
13. Gabriel (Waldeck, 1 July 1621 – Waldeck, 6 January 1624).
14. Count John II (Waldeck, 7 November 1623 – Landau, 10 October 1668), succeeded his father as Count of Waldeck-Landau. He married:
  1. on 17 December 1644 to Alexandrine Maria Gräfin von Vehlen und Meggen (? – Thorn, 27 February 1662).
  2. at Merlau Castle on 10 November 1667 to Landgravine Dorothy Henriette of Hesse-Darmstadt (Darmstadt, 14 October 1641 – Landau, 22 December 1672).
15. Louise (Waldeck, 28 January 1625 – 4 October 1665), married to Gerhard Ludwig Freiherr von Effern.
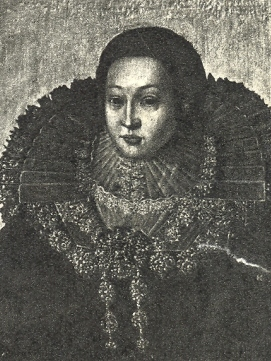
Mary Magdalene of Waldeck-Wildungen (1606–1671).

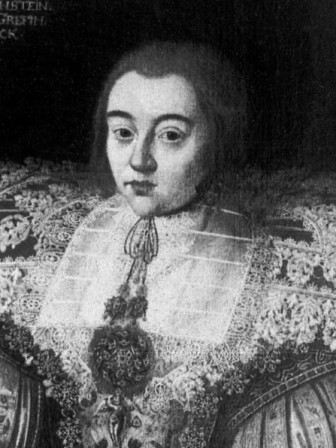
Anne Augusta of Waldeck-Wildungen (1608–1658).

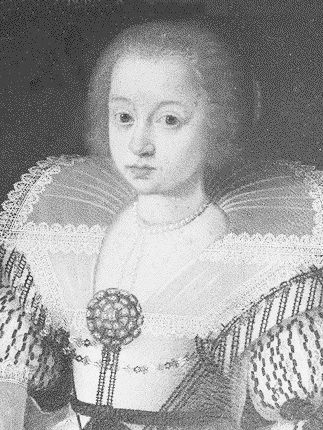
Agnes of Waldeck-Wildungen (1618–1651).

== Ancestors ==
Ancestors of Count Christian of Waldeck-Wildungen
Great-great-grandparents	Philip II of Waldeck-Eisenberg (1452/53–1524) ⚭ 1481; Catherine of Solms-Lich (?–1492)	Otto IV of Hoya (1425–1497) ⚭ Anne of Lippe (1452–1533)	Günther XXXIX of Schwarzburg-Blankenburg (1455–1531) ⚭ 1493; Amelia of Mansfeld (?–1517)	William VI of Henneberg-Schleusingen (1478–1559) ⚭ Anastasia of Brandenburg (1478–1557)	Burchard of Barby and Mühlingen (1454–1505) ⚭ 1482; Magdalene of Mecklenburg (?–1532)	Gebhard VII of Mansfeld-Hinterort (1478–1558) ⚭ 1510; Margaretha of Gleichen (ca. 1495–1567)	Ernest of Anhalt-Zerbst (?–1516) ⚭ 1494; Margaret of Münsterberg (1473–1530)	Joachim I Nestor of Brandenburg (1484–1535) ⚭ 1502; Elisabeth of Denmark (1485–1555)
Great-grandparents	Philip III of Waldeck-Eisenberg (1486–1539) ⚭ 1503; Adelaide of Hoya (1475–1513)		Henry XXXII of Schwarzburg-Blankenburg (1499–1538) ⚭ 1524; Catherine of Henneberg-Schleusingen (1508–1567)		Wolfgang of Barby and Mühlingen (1502–1564) ⚭ 1526; Agnes of Mansfeld-Hinterort (1511–1558)		John II of Anhalt-Zerbst (1504–1551) ⚭ 1534; Margaret of Brandenburg (1511–1577)	
Grandparents	Wolrad II of Waldeck-Eisenberg (1509–1578) ⚭ 1546; Anastasia Günthera of Schwarzburg-Blankenburg (1526–1570)				Albrecht X of Barby and Mühlingen (1534–1588) ⚭ 1559; Mary of Anhalt-Zerbst (1538–1563)			
Parents	Josias I of Waldeck-Eisenberg (1554–1588) ⚭ 1582; Mary of Barby and Mühlingen (1563–1619)							

== Literature ==
- Karl Eichler: "Die Wildunger Hexenprozesse", in: Geschichtsblätter für Waldeck und Pyrmont, issue 24, 1927, pp. 103–126 (in particular pp. 104, 106, 111 and 112).
- Klettenberg, Friedrich August von (1713). Reichs-Gräflich-Waldeckischer Helden- und Regenten-Saal (in German). Frankfurt am Main: Hocker. pp. 154–173.
- Varnhagen, Johann Adolf Theodor Ludwig (1853). Grundlage der Waldeckischen Landes- und Regentengeschichte (in German). Vol. Zweiter Band. Arolsen: Verlag der Speyer'schen Buchhandlung.

== Sources ==
- Behr, Kamill (1854). Genealogie der in Europa regierenden Fürstenhäuser (in German). Leipzig: Verlag von Bernhard Tauchnitz.
- Dek, A.W.E. (1962). Graf Johann der Mittlere von Nassau-Siegen und seine 25 Kinder (in German). Rijswijk: Krips Repro.
- Dek, A.W.E. (1968). "De afstammelingen van Juliana van Stolberg tot aan het jaar van de Vrede van Münster". Spiegel der Historie. Maandblad voor de geschiedenis der Nederlanden (in Dutch). 1968 (7/8): 228–303.
- Dek, A.W.E. (1970). Genealogie van het Vorstenhuis Nassau (in Dutch). Zaltbommel: Europese Bibliotheek.
- von Ehrenkrook, Hans Friedrich; Förster, Karl & Marchtaler, Kurt Erhard (1928). Ahnenreihen aus allen deutschen Gauen. Beilage zum Archiv für Sippenforschung und allen verwandten Gebieten (in German). Görlitz: Verlag für Sippenforschung und Wappenkunde C.A. Starke.
- Haarmann, Torsten (2014). Das Haus Waldeck und Pyrmont. Mehr als 900 Jahre Gesamtgeschichte mit Stammfolge. Deutsche Fürstenhäuser (in German). Vol. Heft 35. Werl: Börde-Verlag. ISBN 978-3-981-4458-2-4.
- Hoffmeister, Jacob Christoph Carl (1883). Historisch-genealogisches Handbuch über alle Grafen und Fürsten von Waldeck und Pyrmont seit 1228 (in German). Cassel: Verlag Gustav Klaunig.
- Huberty, Michel; Giraud, Alain & Magdelaine, F. & B. (1981). l'Allemagne Dynastique (in French). Vol. Tome III: Brunswick-Nassau-Schwarzbourg. Le Perreux: Alain Giraud.
- Huberty, Michel; Giraud, Alain & Magdelaine, F. & B. (1987). l'Allemagne Dynastique (in French). Vol. Tome V: Hohenzollern-Waldeck-Familles alliées A-B. Le Perreux-sur-Marne: Alain Giraud.
- Menk, Gerhard (1992). Georg Friedrich von Waldeck 1620–1692. Eine biographische Skizze. Waldeckische Historische Hefte (in German). Vol. Band 3. Arolsen: Waldeckischer Geschichtsverein e.V. ISBN 3-9802226-5-9.
- Textor von Haiger, Johann (1617). Nassauische Chronik (in German). Herborn: Christoph Raab.
- Vorsterman van Oyen, A.A. (1882). Het vorstenhuis Oranje-Nassau. Van de vroegste tijden tot heden (in Dutch). Leiden/Utrecht: A.W. Sijthoff/J.L. Beijers.
- von Wurzbach, Constant (1885). "Christian Graf Waldeck". Biographisches Lexikon des Kaiserthums Oesterreich, enthaltend die Lebenskizzen der denkwürdigen Personen, welche seit 1750 in de österreichischen Kronländern geboren wurden oder darin gelebt und gewirkt haben (in German). Vol. Zweiundfünfzigster Theil. Wien: Verlag der k.k. Hof- und Staatsdruckerei. p. 172.

Christian, Count of Waldeck-Wildungen House of Waldeck Born: 24/25 December 1585 Died: 31 December 1637
Preceded by Josias I	Count of Waldeck-Eisenberg; 1588–1607	County divided
Newly created	Count of Waldeck-Wildungen; 1607–1637	Succeeded by Philip VII of Waldeck-Wildungen; John II of Waldeck-Landau
Preceded by Hans Louis of Gleichen	Count of Pyrmont; 1625–1637	Succeeded by Philip VII of Waldeck-Wildungen
