= John II of Waldeck-Landau =

German count and general in the Swedish Army (1623–1668)

John II, Count of Waldeck-Landau

Count of Waldeck-Landau
- Coat of arms
- Reign: 1638–1668
- Predecessor: Christian of Waldeck-Wildungen
- Successor: Christian Louis of Waldeck-Wildungen
- Full name: John II Count of Waldeck-Landau
- Native name: Johann II. Graf von Waldeck-Landau
- Born: 7 November 1623; Waldeck
- Died: 10 October 1668 (aged 44); Landau
- Noble family: House of Waldeck
- Spouses: Alexandrine Maria Gräfin von Vehlen und Meggen; Dorothy Henriette of Hesse-Darmstadt
- Issue: –
- Father: Christian of Waldeck-Wildungen
- Mother: Elisabeth of Nassau-Siegen
- Occupation: Major general in the Swedish Army

Count John II of Waldeck-Landau (7 November 1623 – 10 October 1668), German: Johann II. Graf von Waldeck-Landau, official titles: Graf zu Waldeck und Pyrmont, Herr zu Tonna, was since 1638 Count of Waldeck-Landau. He served in the Swedish Army.

== Biography ==
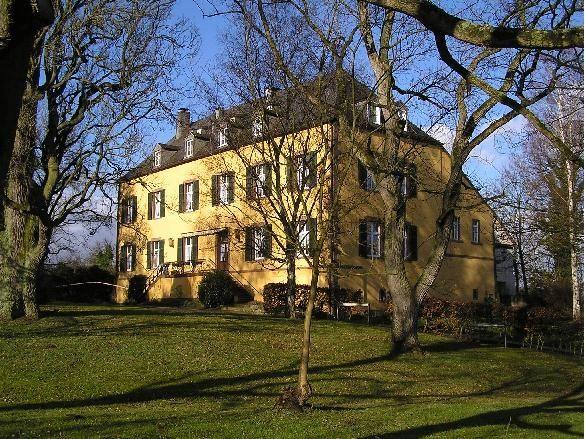
Landau Castle. Photo: Ralph Busch, 2007.

John was born on 7 November 1623 in Waldeck as the fourteenth child of Count Christian of Waldeck-Wildungen and his wife Countess Elisabeth of Nassau-Siegen.

John's eldest brother, Philip VII, succeeded their father early 1638 as Count of Waldeck-Wildungen, while John became Count of Waldeck-Landau. He had his Residenz in Landau since then. The entire County of Waldeck, was heavily in debt. The financial difficulties of the county did not change when the counts of Waldeck acquired the Lordship of Tonna in 1640. The lordship was sold to Duke Frederick I of Saxe-Gotha-Altenburg in 1677.

John served as major general in the Swedish Army. He died in Landau on 10 October 1668. As he was childless, the county of Waldeck-Landau was inherited by his nephew Christian Louis of Waldeck-Wildungen.

== Marriages ==
John married firstly on 17 December 1644 to Alexandrine Maria Gräfin von Vehlen und Meggen (? – Thorn, 27 February 1662). She was the widow of Count Emich of Daun-Falkenstein.

John remarried at Merlau Castle on 10 November 1667 to Landgravine Dorothy Henriette of Hesse-Darmstadt (Darmstadt, 14 October 1641 – Landau, 22 December 1672), daughter of Landgrave George II of Hesse-Darmstadt and Princess Sophia Eleonore of Saxony.

== Ancestors ==
Ancestors of Count John II of Waldeck-Landau
Great-great-grandparents	Philip III of Waldeck-Eisenberg (1486–1539) ⚭ 1503; Adelaide of Hoya (1475–1513)	Henry XXXII of Schwarzburg-Blankenburg (1499–1538) ⚭ 1524; Catherine of Henneberg-Schleusingen (1508–1567)	Wolfgang of Barby and Mühlingen (1502–1564) ⚭ 1526; Agnes of Mansfeld-Hinterort (1511–1558)	John II of Anhalt-Zerbst (1504–1551) ⚭ 1534; Margaret of Brandenburg (1511–1577)	William I 'the Rich' of Nassau-Siegen (1487–1559) ⚭ 1531; Juliane of Stolberg-Wernigerode (1506–1580)	George III of Leuchtenberg (1502–1555) ⚭ 1528; Barbara of Brandenburg-Ansbach (1495–1552)	Henry VIII of Waldeck-Wildungen (1465–1513) ⚭ before 1492; Anastasia of Runkel (?–1502/03)	Salentin VII of Isenburg-Grenzau (before 1470–1534) ⚭ Elisabeth of Hunolstein-Neumagen (ca. 1475–1536/38)
Great-grandparents	Wolrad II of Waldeck-Eisenberg (1509–1578) ⚭ 1546; Anastasia Günthera of Schwarzburg-Blankenburg (1526–1570)		Albrecht X of Barby and Mühlingen (1534–1588) ⚭ 1559; Mary of Anhalt-Zerbst (1538–1563)		John VI 'the Elder' of Nassau-Siegen (1536–1606) ⚭ 1559; Elisabeth of Leuchtenberg (1537–1579)		Philip IV of Waldeck-Wildungen (1493–1574) ⚭ 1554; Jutta of Isenburg-Grenzau (?–1564)	
Grandparents	Josias I of Waldeck-Eisenberg (1554–1588) ⚭ 1582; Mary of Barby and Mühlingen (1563–1619)				John VII 'the Middle' of Nassau-Siegen (1561–1623) ⚭ 1581; Magdalene of Waldeck-Wildungen (1558–1599)			
Parents	Christian of Waldeck-Wildungen (1585–1637) ⚭ 1604; Elisabeth of Nassau-Siegen (1584–1661)							

== Sources ==
- Behr, Kamill (1854). Genealogie der in Europa regierenden Fürstenhäuser (in German). Leipzig: Verlag von Bernhard Tauchnitz.
- Dek, A.W.E. (1968). "De afstammelingen van Juliana van Stolberg tot aan het jaar van de Vrede van Münster". Spiegel der Historie. Maandblad voor de geschiedenis der Nederlanden (in Dutch). 1968 (7/8): 228–303.
- Dek, A.W.E. (1970). Genealogie van het Vorstenhuis Nassau (in Dutch). Zaltbommel: Europese Bibliotheek.
- von Ehrenkrook, Hans Friedrich; Förster, Karl & Marchtaler, Kurt Erhard (1928). Ahnenreihen aus allen deutschen Gauen. Beilage zum Archiv für Sippenforschung und allen verwandten Gebieten (in German). Görlitz: Verlag für Sippenforschung und Wappenkunde C.A. Starke.
- Haarmann, Torsten (2014). Das Haus Waldeck und Pyrmont. Mehr als 900 Jahre Gesamtgeschichte mit Stammfolge. Deutsche Fürstenhäuser (in German). Vol. Heft 35. Werl: Börde-Verlag. ISBN 978-3-981-4458-2-4.
- Hoffmeister, Jacob Christoph Carl (1883). Historisch-genealogisches Handbuch über alle Grafen und Fürsten von Waldeck und Pyrmont seit 1228 (in German). Cassel: Verlag Gustav Klaunig.
- Huberty, Michel; Giraud, Alain & Magdelaine, F. & B. (1981). l'Allemagne Dynastique (in French). Vol. Tome III: Brunswick-Nassau-Schwarzbourg. Le Perreux: Alain Giraud.
- Huberty, Michel; Giraud, Alain & Magdelaine, F. & B. (1987). l'Allemagne Dynastique (in French). Vol. Tome V: Hohenzollern-Waldeck-Familles alliées A-B. Le Perreux-sur-Marne: Alain Giraud.
