= Philip Dietrich, Count of Waldeck =

Count of Waldeck-Eisenberg (1614-1645)

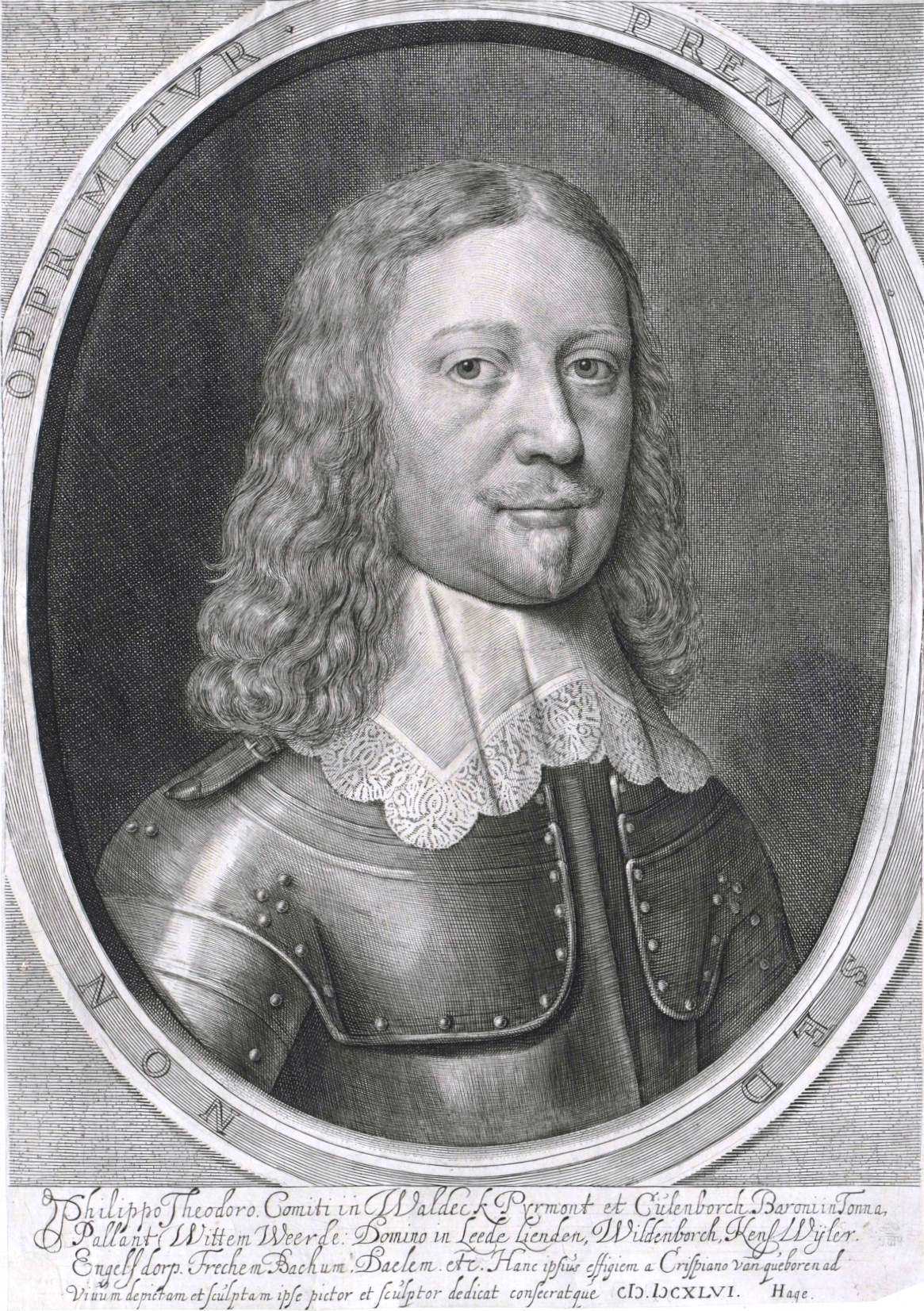
- Engraving of Philip Dietrich of Waldeck
- Born: 2 November 1614; Arolsen
- Died: 7 December 1645 (aged 31); Korbach
- Noble family: Waldeck
- Spouse: Maria Magdalena of Nassau-Siegen
- Issue: Henry Wolrad, Count of Waldeck; Countess Amalia Katharina of Waldeck-Eisenberg
- Father: Wolrad IV, Count of Waldeck-Eisenberg
- Mother: Anna of Baden-Durlach

Philip Dietrich (also known as Philip Theodore) (2 November 1614 in Arolsen – 7 December 1645 in Korbach), was the ruling Count of Waldeck-Eisenberg from 1640 until his death.

== Early life and ancestry ==
Philip Dietrich was the son of Count Wolrad IV of Waldeck-Eisenberg and Magravine Anna of Baden-Durlach, heir to the County of Culemborg in today's Netherlands.

== Marriage and issue ==
In 1639 in Culemborg, Philip married Countess Maria Magdalena of Nassau-Siegen (1622-1647), daughter of William, Count of Nassau-Siegen. With her, he had several children, including his successor as ruler, Henry Wolrad. Another son, Florent William died as a baby in 1643. His eldest child and only daughter Amalia Katharina married in 1664 to George Louis I, Count of Erbach-Erbach.

== Life ==
From the inheritance claims of his mother's, Philip received the Lordships of Kinsweiler, Engelsdorf, Frechen and Bachem in the Eifel area. He made several journeys to France and served in the Dutch army for a long time.

In 1639, Count Floris of Pallandt died, the holder of the Lordships of Cuylenburg, Werth, Pallandt and Wittem. Philip Dietrich inherited these possessions via his mother. In 1640, he inherited Waldeck-Eisenberg.

He alternated his residence between Eisenberg Castle and Culemborg. He fought a protracted legal battle about his mother's claims in the Eiffel. In the end, he did not receive them, but had to accept a monetary compensation.

== Death ==
Count Philip Dietrich, Count of Waldeck died on 7 December 1645 in Korbach. He was interred, alongside his wife, in the Nicolaikirche, Korbach, Hesse, Germany.
