= Josias I of Waldeck-Eisenberg =

German count (1554–1588)

Josias I, Count of Waldeck-Eisenberg

Count of Waldeck-Eisenberg
- Coat of arms
- Reign: 1578–1588
- Predecessor: Wolrad II
- Successor: Christian; Wolrad IV
- Full name: Josias I Count of Waldeck-Eisenberg
- Native name: Josias I. Graf von Waldeck-Eisenberg
- Born: Josias Graf von Waldeck-Eisenberg; 18 March 1554; Eisenberg Castle
- Died: 6 August 1588 (aged 34); Eisenberg Castle
- Buried: 9 August 1588; Saint Nicholas Church, Korbach
- Noble family: House of Waldeck
- Spouse: Mary of Barby and Mühlingen
- Issue Detail: Christian; Wolrad IV
- Father: Wolrad II of Waldeck-Eisenberg
- Mother: Anastasia Günthera of Schwarzburg-Blankenburg

Count Josias I of Waldeck-Eisenberg (German: Josias I. Graf von Waldeck-Eisenberg; 18 March 1554 – 6 August 1588) was a German nobleman who was Count of Waldeck-Eisenberg from 1578 until his death.

In the ten years of his short reign, Josias began the long overdue reform of the state administration, including the regulation of the churches, which aimed to strengthen the internal affairs of the state and thus achieve a clear independence of the county and a separation from Hesse. To solve the problems of the time, however, a longer reign of Josias would have been necessary, as well as a like-minded attitude of the other counts of Waldeck. Among them he took the leading position.

== Biography ==
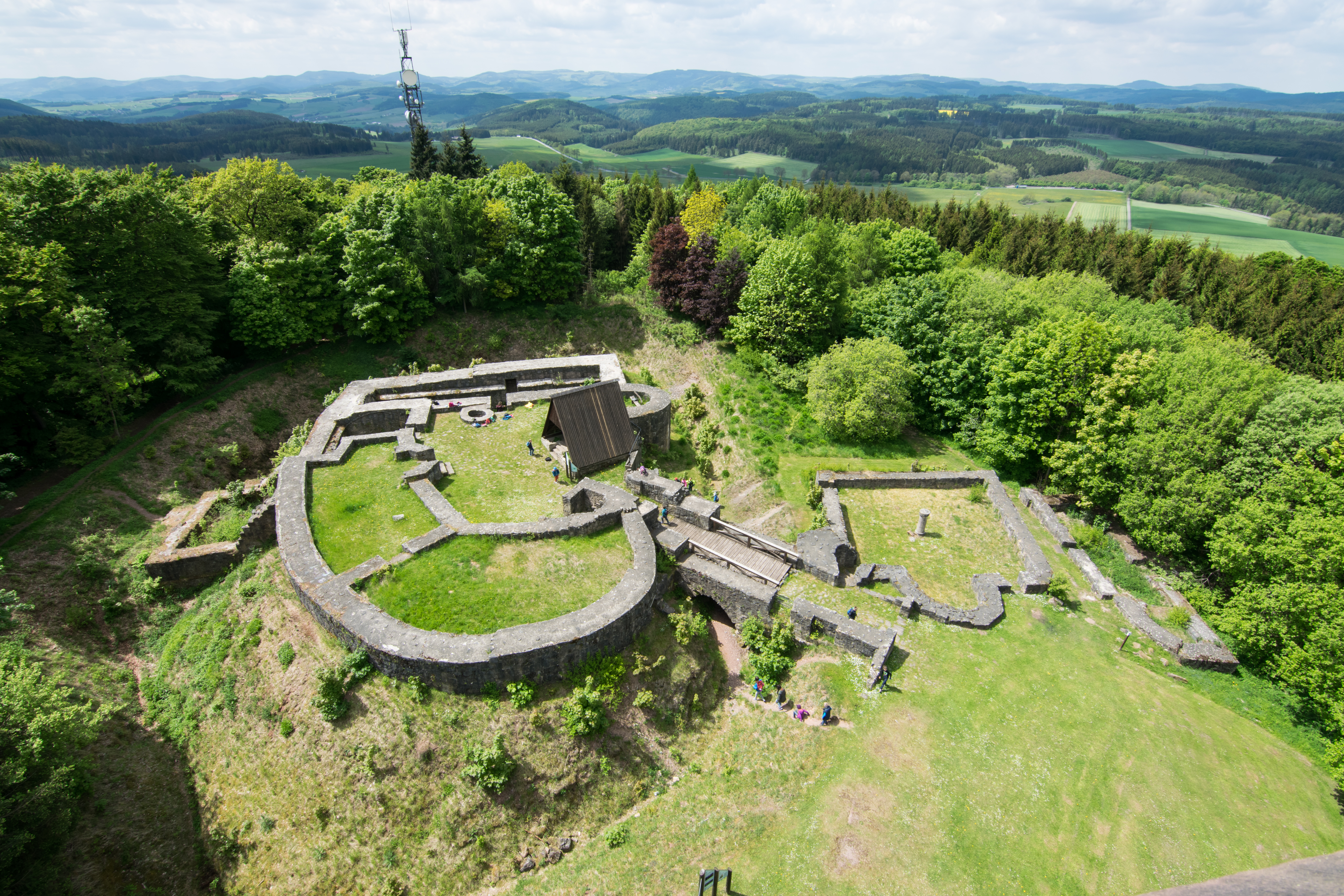
The ruins of Eisenberg Castle, 2015.

Josias was born at Eisenberg Castle on 18 March 1554 as the sixth child of Count Wolrad II 'the Scholar' of Waldeck-Eisenberg and Countess Anastasia Günthera of Schwarzburg-Blankenburg. Josias' two older brothers, Francis and Henry William, died at a young age. Josias was well educated and disciplined. From his youth he rejected excessive drinking and is said to have forbidden it to others. He entered the court in Kassel in 1570 and initially served Landgrave William IV of Hesse-Kassel. There he met Elector Augustus of Saxony, who employed him only a few months later. Josias took part in military campaigns in East Frisia. He did not return to Waldeck until February 1577. After the death of his father in 1578, Josias took over the government of the part of the county that was allocated to him. He moved the chancellery from Eilhausen to Korbach. Furthermore, he was still in the service of the Elector of Saxony and travelled to Dresden several times.

Already at the beginning of his reign, he succeeded in creating an important accent, whose unifying direction was, however, tempered by confessional differences. For the foundation of a modern state school in the former Franciscan monastery of Korbach, a Gymnasium Illustre according to the Strasbourg model, he not only got the consent of the other counts of Waldeck, the cadet branches Waldeck-Landau and Waldeck-Wildungen, but also of the estates of the realm and the cities with which he was otherwise in constant conflict. To finance the state school the properties of Berich Abbey, which had previously been administered by the count's family, were sold. The 15-year old Count Wolrad III himself attended the school which was opened in 1579. (Note: The school still exists: the Alte Landesschule Korbach.) Because of the Protestant orientation, however, there were differences of opinion, as a result of which some of the renowned professors left the school in 1586 and moved to the Calvinist-oriented Academia Nassauensis in Herborn. (Note: This college was founded in 1584 by Count John VI of Nassau-Dillenburg. The school was discontinued in 1817.) Josias, on the other hand, oriented himself towards orthodox Lutheranism.

A contribution to the internal consolidation of the county and its sovereignty was the land ordinance of 1581, which, however, was only a police ordinance and not yet comprehensive legislation, which was only worked on in the 17th century. In order to strengthen his desire for independence, Josias had appointed qualified civil servants who no longer acted in the interests of Hesse but in the interests of the county.

Josias could not finish his work. He died suddenly and unexpectedly on 6 August 1588 at Eisenberg Castle, where guests from the baptism of his fourth child, Wolrad IV, were still staying. Josias was buried in the Saint Nicholas Church in Korbach on 9 August 1588. He was succeeded by his underage sons Christian and Wolrad IV, who were under the custody and regency of their mother and Count Francis III of Waldeck-Landau.

== Marriage and issue ==
Josias married in 1582 (Note: The sources do not mention an exact date of the marriage.) to Countess Marie of Barby and Mühlingen (Magdeburg, 8 April 1563 – Waldeck Castle, 19/29 December 1619), daughter of Count Albrecht X of Barby and Mühlingen and Princess Mary of Anhalt-Zerbst. Josias' widow remarried on 19 November 1592 to Count George III of Erbach. She was buried next to Josias in the Saint Nicholas Church in Korbach on 5 January 1620.

From the marriage of Josias and Marie, the following children were born:

1. Maria Anastasia (31 March 1584 – 5 March 1585).
2. Count Christian (Eisenberg Castle, 24/25 December 1585 – Waldeck Castle, 31 December 1637), succeeded his father as Count of Waldeck-Eisenberg in 1588. Married in Wildungen in November 1604 (Note: "Wildungen 19-11-1604 in Dek (1962) (date confirmed in Europäische Stammtafeln I, 117). Wildungen 29-11-1604 (new style?) in von Ehrenkrook, et al. (1928) I, 195 and 409. Europäische Stammtafeln I, 139 on the other hand places the marriage on 18-11-1604, which is the date Hoffmeister (1883) states. However, an original copy of the latter work with handwritten notes by various archivists, which is in the State Archives Marburg, states that the following inscription about Elisabeth is on the baptismal font at Arolsen: «dicta Ao 1604 19 Novemb. et Nuptiae Wildungen celebratae».") to Countess Elisabeth of Nassau-Siegen (Dillenburg Castle, 8 November 1584 – Landau, 26 July 1661).
3. Juliane (11 April 1587 – Erbach Palace, 28 February 1622), married in Erbach on 2 March 1606 to Count Louis I of Erbach (Erbach, 3 September 1579 – Erbach, 12 April 1643).
4. Count Wolrad IV (Eisenberg Castle, 7 July 1588 – Arolsen, 6 October 1640), succeeded his father as Count of Waldeck-Eisenberg in 1588. Married in Durlach on 8 September 1607 to Margravine Anne of Baden-Hochberg (Hochberg, 13 November 1587 – 11 March 1649).

== Ancestors ==
Ancestors of Count Josias I of Waldeck-Eisenberg
Great-great-grandparents	Wolrad I of Waldeck-Waldeck (1407–1475) ⚭ 1440; Barbara of Wertheim (?–?)	Cuno of Solms-Lich (?–1477) ⚭ 1457; Walpurgis of Dhaun (?–?)	Otto III of Hoya (?–1455) ⚭ Adelaide of Rietberg (?–1459)	Bernhard VII of Lippe (1429–1511) ⚭ 1452; Anne of Holstein-Schaumburg (1430–1495)	Henry XXVI of Schwarzburg-Blankenburg (ca. 1418–1488) ⚭ 1434; Elisabeth of Cleves (1420–1488)	Wolrad II of Mansfeld (1448–1499) ⚭ Margaret of Honstein (?–1508)	William V of Henneberg-Schleusingen (1434–1480) ⚭ 1469; Margaret of Brunswick-Wolfenbüttel (1451–1509)	Albrecht III Achilles of Brandenburg (1414–1486) ⚭ 1478; Anne of Saxony (1437–1512)
Great-grandparents	Philip II of Waldeck-Eisenberg (1452/53–1524) ⚭ 1481; Catherine of Solms-Lich (?–1492)		Otto IV of Hoya (1425–1497) ⚭ Anne of Lippe (1452–1533)		Günther XXXIX of Schwarzburg-Blankenburg (1455–1531) ⚭ 1493; Amelia of Mansfeld (?–1517)		William VI of Henneberg-Schleusingen (1478–1559) ⚭ Anastasia of Brandenburg (1478–1557)	
Grandparents	Philip III of Waldeck-Eisenberg (1486–1539) ⚭ 1503; Adelaide of Hoya (1475–1513)				Henry XXXII of Schwarzburg-Blankenburg (1499–1538) ⚭ 1524; Catherine of Henneberg-Schleusingen (1508–1567)			
Parents	Wolrad II of Waldeck-Eisenberg (1509–1578) ⚭ 1546; Anastasia Günthera of Schwarzburg-Blankenburg (1526–1570)							

== Literature ==
- Varnhagen, Johann Adolf Theodor Ludwig (1853). Grundlage der Waldeckischen Landes- und Regentengeschichte (in German). Vol. Zweiter Band. Arolsen: Verlag der Speyer'schen Buchhandlung.

== Sources ==
- Behr, Kamill (1854). Genealogie der in Europa regierenden Fürstenhäuser (in German). Leipzig: Verlag von Bernhard Tauchnitz.
- Dek, A.W.E. (1962). Graf Johann der Mittlere von Nassau-Siegen und seine 25 Kinder (in German). Rijswijk: Krips Repro.
- Dek, A.W.E. (1968). "De afstammelingen van Juliana van Stolberg tot aan het jaar van de Vrede van Münster". Spiegel der Historie. Maandblad voor de geschiedenis der Nederlanden (in Dutch). 1968 (7/8): 228–303.
- Dek, A.W.E. (1970). Genealogie van het Vorstenhuis Nassau (in Dutch). Zaltbommel: Europese Bibliotheek.
- von Ehrenkrook, Hans Friedrich; Förster, Karl & Marchtaler, Kurt Erhard (1928). Ahnenreihen aus allen deutschen Gauen. Beilage zum Archiv für Sippenforschung und allen verwandten Gebieten (in German). Görlitz: Verlag für Sippenforschung und Wappenkunde C.A. Starke.
- Haarmann, Torsten (2014). Das Haus Waldeck und Pyrmont. Mehr als 900 Jahre Gesamtgeschichte mit Stammfolge. Deutsche Fürstenhäuser (in German). Vol. Heft 35. Werl: Börde-Verlag. ISBN 978-3-981-4458-2-4.
- Hoffmeister, Jacob Christoph Carl (1883). Historisch-genealogisches Handbuch über alle Grafen und Fürsten von Waldeck und Pyrmont seit 1228 (in German). Cassel: Verlag Gustav Klaunig.
- Huberty, Michel; Giraud, Alain & Magdelaine, F. & B. (1981). l'Allemagne Dynastique (in French). Vol. Tome III: Brunswick-Nassau-Schwarzbourg. Le Perreux: Alain Giraud.
- Huberty, Michel; Giraud, Alain & Magdelaine, F. & B. (1987). l'Allemagne Dynastique (in French). Vol. Tome V: Hohenzollern-Waldeck-Familles alliées A-B. Le Perreux-sur-Marne: Alain Giraud.

Josias I of Waldeck-Eisenberg House of Waldeck Born: 18 March 1554 Died: 6 August 1588
Preceded by Wolrad II	Count of Waldeck-Eisenberg; 15 April 1578 – 6 August 1588	Succeeded by Christian; Wolrad IV
