= Louis I of Erbach-Erbach =

Count of Erbach-Erbach

Louis I, Count of Erbach-Erbach (3 September 1579 – 12 April 1643), was a German prince member of the House of Erbach and ruler over Erbach, Freienstein, Michelstadt, Bad König and Wildenstein.

== Early life and ancestry ==
Born in Erbach, he was the seventh child and third (but second surviving) son of George III, Count of Erbach-Breuberg by his second wife, Countess Anna of Solms-Laubach (1557-1586), the youngest daughter of Frederick Magnus, Count of Solms-Laubach-Sonnenwalde.

== Biography ==
After the death of their father, Louis I and his surviving brothers divided the Erbach domains in 1606: he received the districts of Erbach and Freienstein.

When their older brother Frederick Magnus died in 1618 without surviving male issue, the brothers divided his domains among them, but this took place only in 1623, when Louis I received Michelstadt and Bad König. In 1627, the death of another of the brother, John Casimir, unmarried and childless, caused another division of the paternal inheritance: this time, Louis I received Wildenstein. Because of his military skills, the Count Louis I was nicknamed Der Ritter (The Knight).

== Marriages and issue ==
He married firstly Countess Juliane of Waldeck-Eisenberg (1584-1622), an only surviving daughter of Josias I, Count of Waldeck-Eisenberg by his wife, Countess Marie of Barby-Mühlingen (1563-1619). Together, they had three sons:

- Count Georg Friedrich of Erbach (1607-1632), died unmarried, aged 25
- Count Gottfried of Erbach (1611-1635), died at Burg Breuberg, aged 23
- Count Friedrich Magnus of Erbach (1618-1625), died as a boy, aged 7

After the death of his first wife, Louis I married Countess Johannette of Sayn-Wittgenstein-Sayn (1604-1666), an only daughter of Wilhelm III, Count of Sayn-Wittgenstein-Sayn by his first wife, Countess Anna Elisabeth of Sayn-Sayn (1572–1608). The marriage remained childless.

== Death ==
Louis died 12 April 1643 in Erbach, aged 63. He was interred in Michelstadt. Because he died without surviving male issue, his only remaining brother, George Albert I, Count of Erbach-Schönberg inherited his domains, and with this reunited all the Erbach family lands.
