= Henry Wolrad, Count of Waldeck =

- Born: 28 March 1642; Culemborg
- Died: 15 July 1664 (aged 22); Graz
- Noble family: Waldeck
- Spouse: Elisabeth Juliane of Waldeck-Wildungen
- Father: Philip Dietrich, Count of Waldeck
- Mother: Maria Magdalena of Nassau-Siegen

Henry Wolrad, Count of Waldeck (28 March 1642 in Culemborg – 15 July 1664 in Graz) was from 1645 Count of Waldeck-Eisenberg and Lord of Culemborg.

== Life ==
He was the son of Count Philip Dietrich of Waldeck-Eisenberg and his wife Maria Magdalena of Nassau-Siegen. He married in 1660 Elisabeth Juliane, a daughter of Count Philip VII of Waldeck-Wildungen. The marriage remained childless.

He inherited Waldeck-Eisenberg when his father died in 1645, at the age of three. His uncle George Frederick took up the regency. Henry Wolrad resided at Eisenberg Castle. During his reign, the castle was once again renovated. His coat of arms and those of his wife and the number 1642 are evidence of this renovation. He tried to revive the gold mine in Eisenberg mountain by licensing a mining company, however, this was not a success.

Wolrad Henry was on his way to join the troops against the Ottoman Empire, when he suddenly died in Graz. Since he had no male heir, Waldeck-Eisenberg fell to his uncle George Frederick.
