= Schloss Pyrmont =

Coordinates: 51°59′0.8″N 9°14′54.1″E

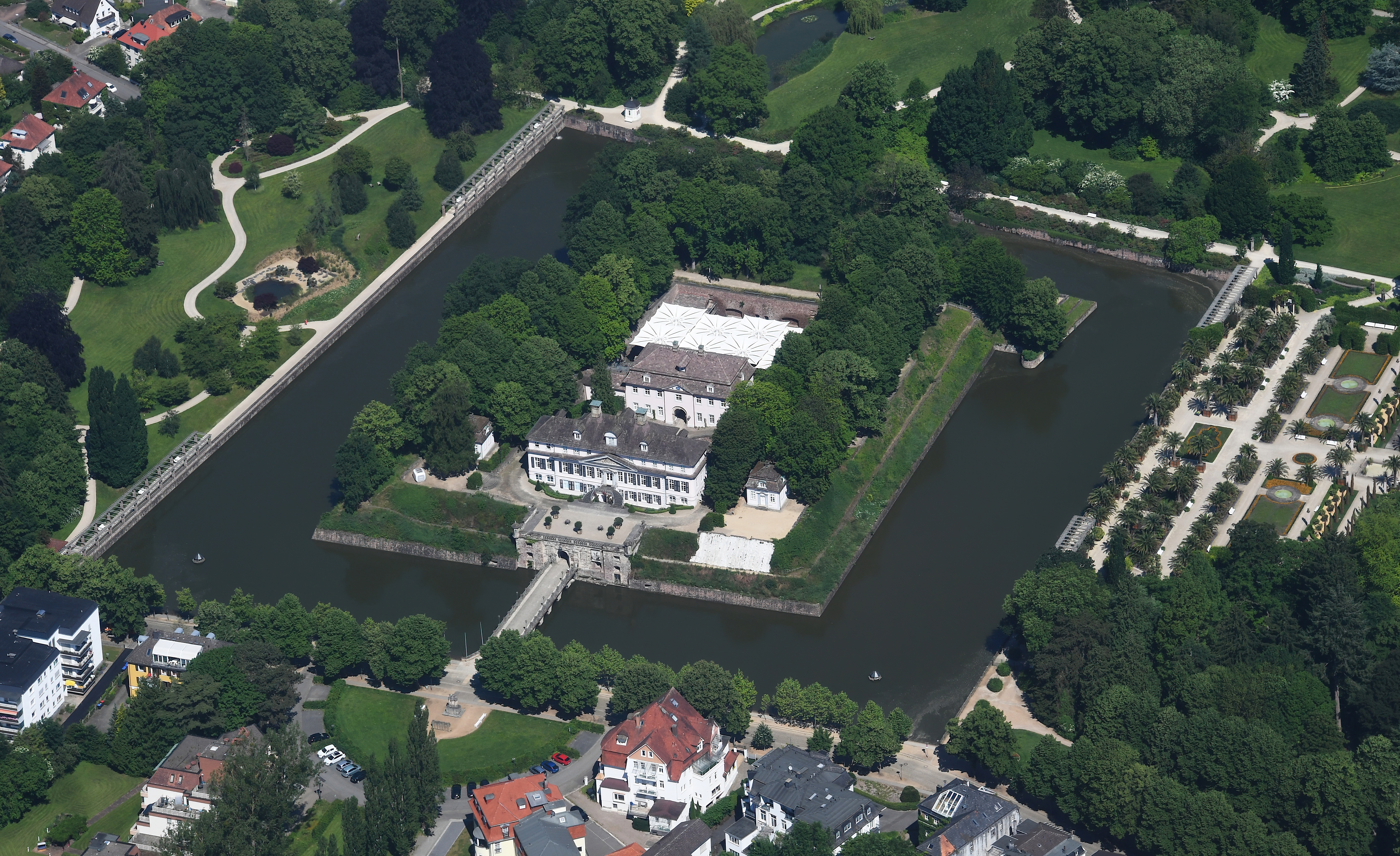
Aerial view of Schloss Pyrmont and its moat

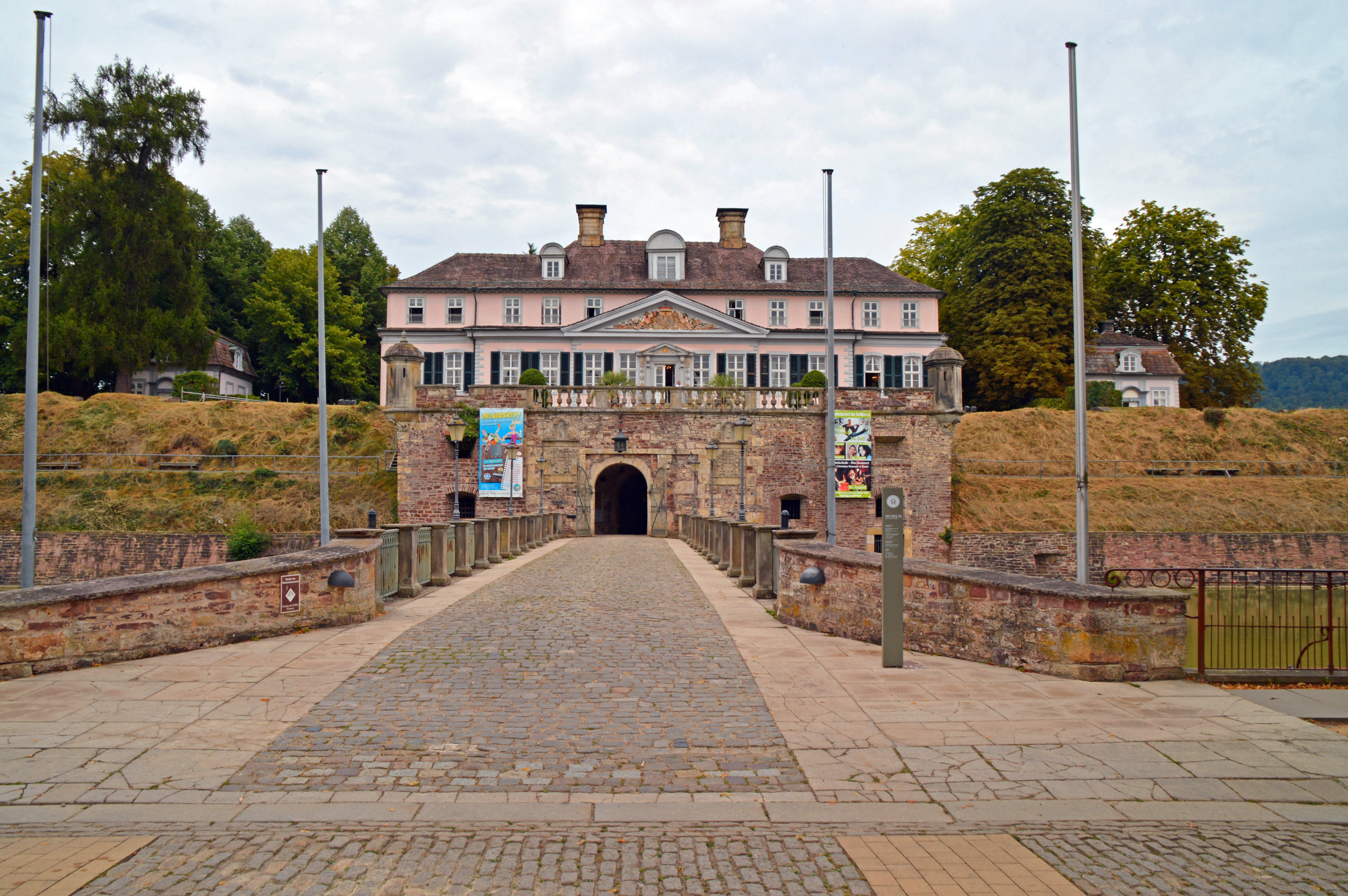
Schloss Pyrmont

Schloss Pyrmont, sometimes called Pyrmont Castle, was a schloss and the summer residence of the counts of Spiegelberg and counts of Waldeck-Pyrmont in the present-day German town of Bad Pyrmont. The current building dates to the 18th century and houses a museum. The schloss is part of Pyrmont Fortress (Festung Pyrmont) which dates to the 16th century.

== History ==
=== Fortress and Renaissance castle ===
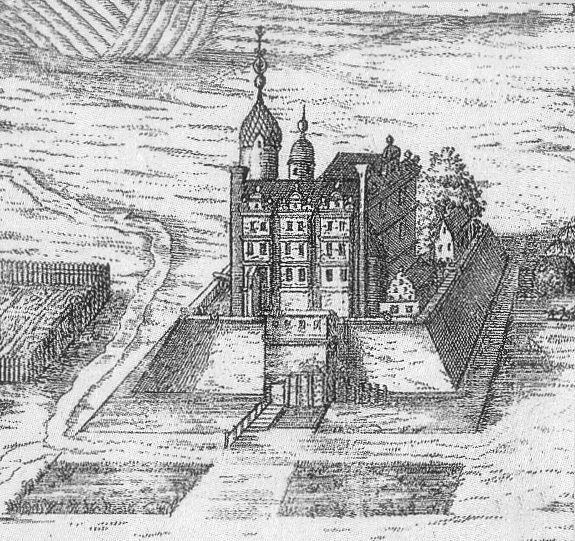
The fortress and Renaissance castle before the Thirty Years' War

Between 1526 and 1536, Count Frederick VI of Spiegelberg, overlord of the County of Pyrmont, built a fortress and schloss in valley of Pyrmont. He had experience in the construction of the fortress when he had reinforced Coppenbrügge Castle with walls and roundels. The fortress of Pyrmont was almost square in shape with a 40-metre-wide moat. The walls had casemates and a stone corner bastion, which echoes the Italian style of fortification. Access to the fortress was via a wooden bridge and later a drawbridge. Buildings were built inside the walls and, in the south-western area, the first schloss was built.

Following the completion of the castle in 1536, it was garrisoned by Count Frederick VI, who resided in neighbouring Lügde. Later the schloss became the side wing of a larger schloss, which his son, Philip, had built in 1557 in the Weser Renaissance style. According to tradition, this was a three-storey building with three wall dormers, similar to the Hämelschenburg. In addition, a tower was built for archiving documents. Philip died before the completion of the Renaissance schloss. The building was completed by the husband of his sister, Hermann Simon of Lippe. Afterwards the counts of Lippe and the counts of Gleichen resided at the schloss. In 1625, Count Hans Louis of Gleichen transferred the County of Pyrmont to the Count of Waldeck.

During the Thirty Years' War, the succession dispute between the Bishopric of Paderborn and the Counts of Waldeck revived. For the Bishopric, troops under General Pappenheim, besieged the Pyrmont fortress in 1629, and its 400-man garrison surrendered after ten months. In 1633, Swedish troops recaptured the fortress, which was reconquered in 1636 by the Imperial Army. After being taken again by the Swedes in 1646, the fortress was handed over to the Counts of Waldeck in 1649. The schloss suffered damage as a result of the sieges. Rebuilt in haste, it served as a summer residence for the counts of Waldeck, but it was also neglected in the period that followed and began to deteriorate.

When Count Anthony Ulrich of Waldeck-Pyrmont took over the regency of Waldeck and Pyrmont in 1706, master builder, Hermann Korb, built a new schloss in the Baroque style. The new building was erected between 1706 and 1710 on the basement and other parts of the earlier residence. As early as 1721, architect, Julius Ludwig Rothweil, extended the building. A commander's house, two cavalier houses and a magazine were built. The fortifications were overhauled. In addition, the Baroque gardens were redesigned. Further changes followed in 1765 under the direction of Franz Friedrich Rothweil. Between 1852 and 1855, several buildings were added and the schloss given its present appearance.

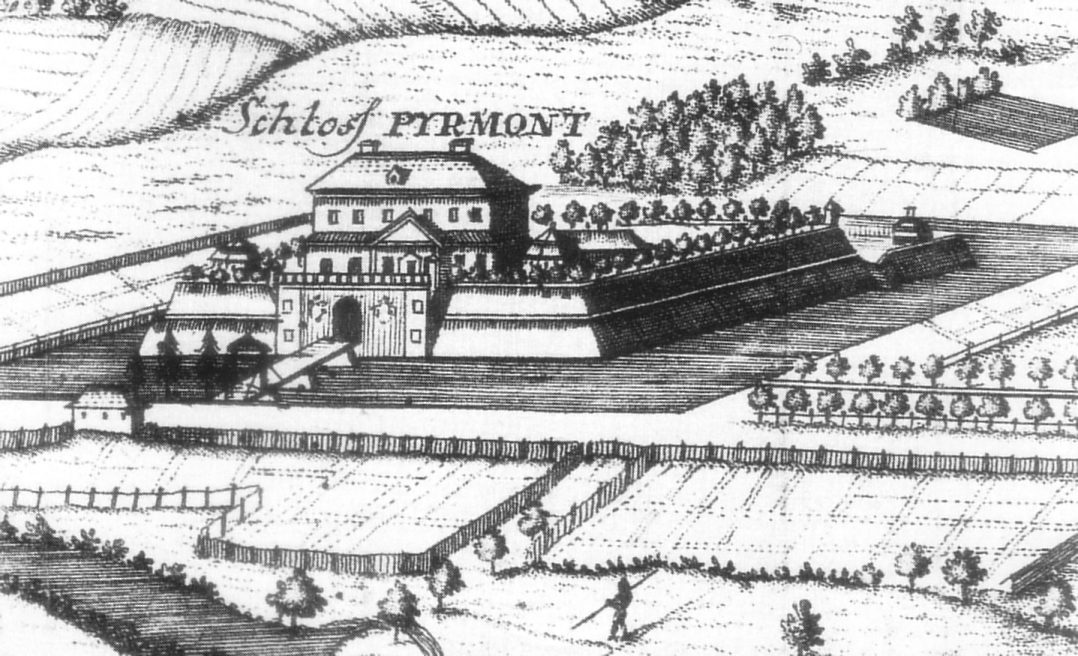
Schloss Pyrmont, 1790

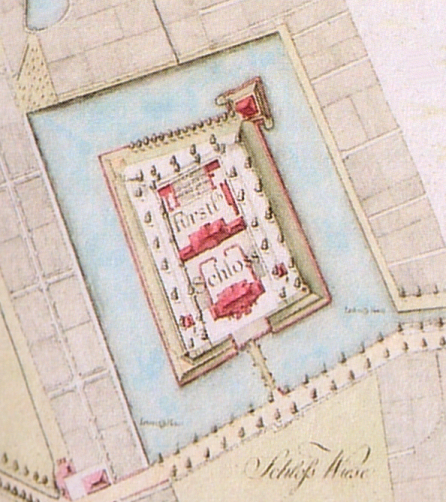
Plan of the schloss, 1790

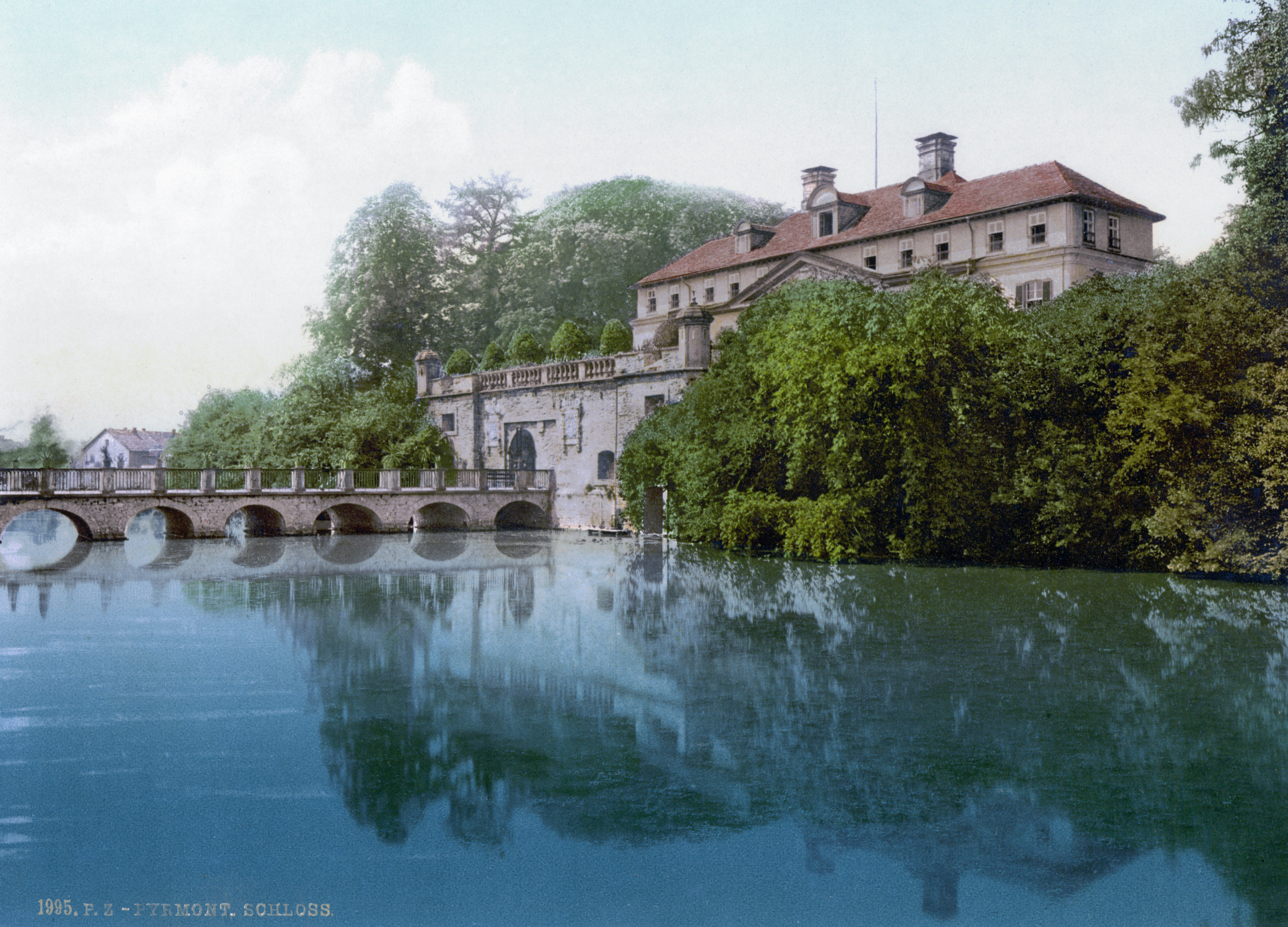
The schloss c. 1900

=== 20th Century ===
During the Second World War, a hospital was established in the schloss, because Pyrmont was a hospital town. After the war, the British Red Cross remained in the castle until 1948. In 1956, the state of Lower Saxony acquired the fortress and castle from the princely family of Waldeck and Pyrmont. The first redevelopment took place from 1960 to 1962; another followed from 1978.

From 1984 to 1987, architect Karl-Heinz Lorey renovated and redesigned the schloss and fortifications for use by the then district folk high school and as a museum. The castle grounds are also used for various events.

== Gallery ==
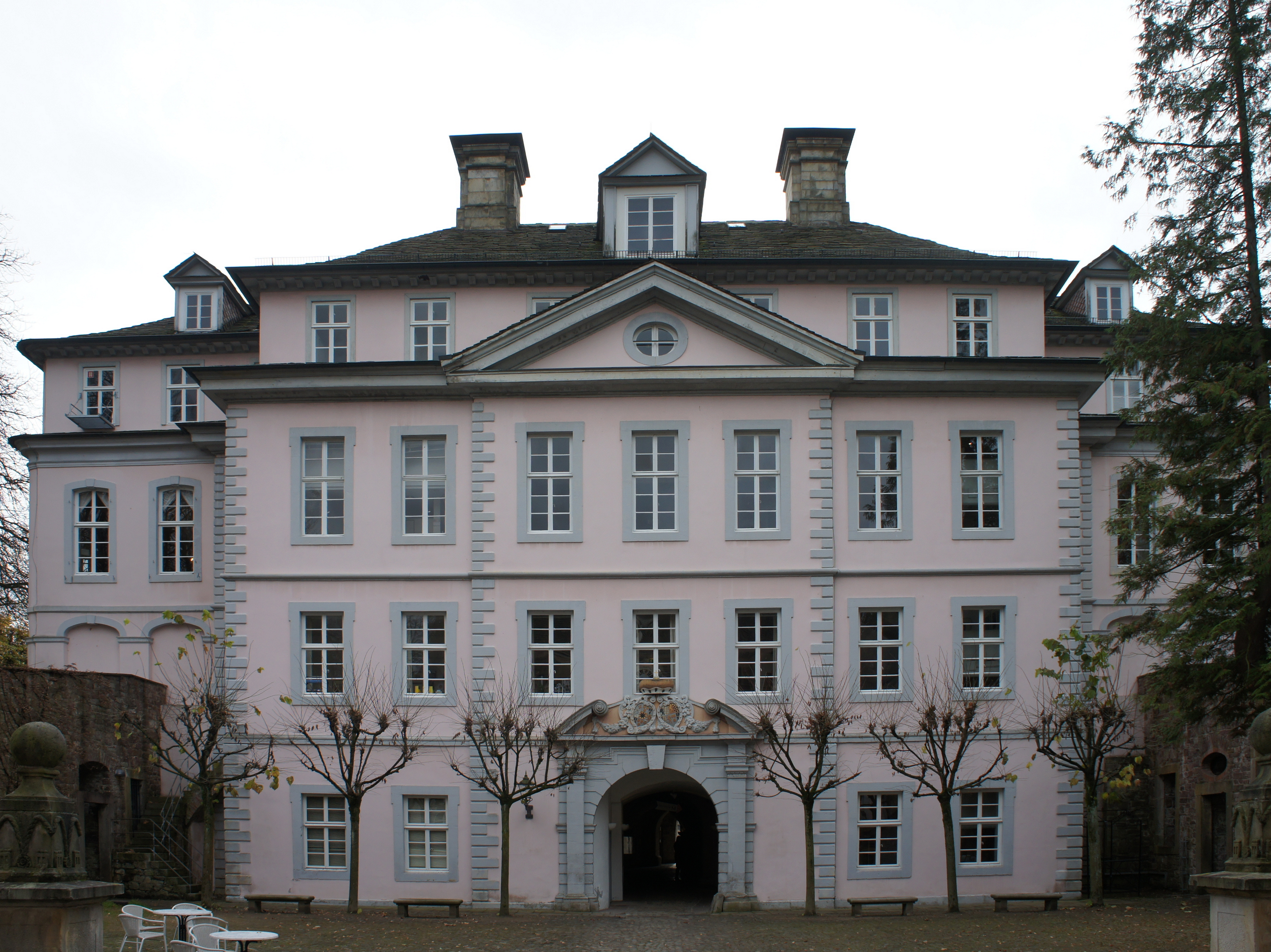
Rear of the schloss

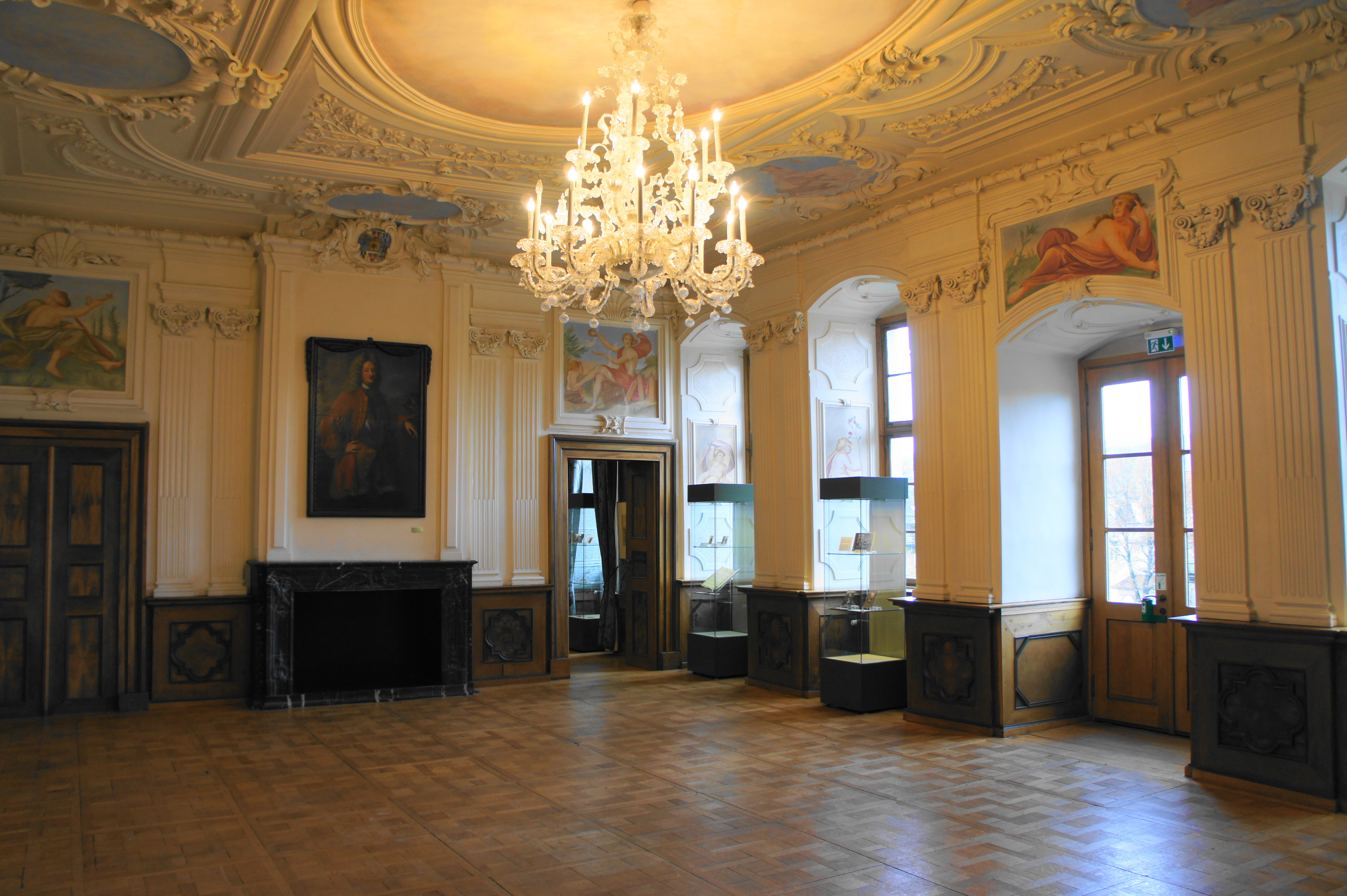
Interior of the schloss

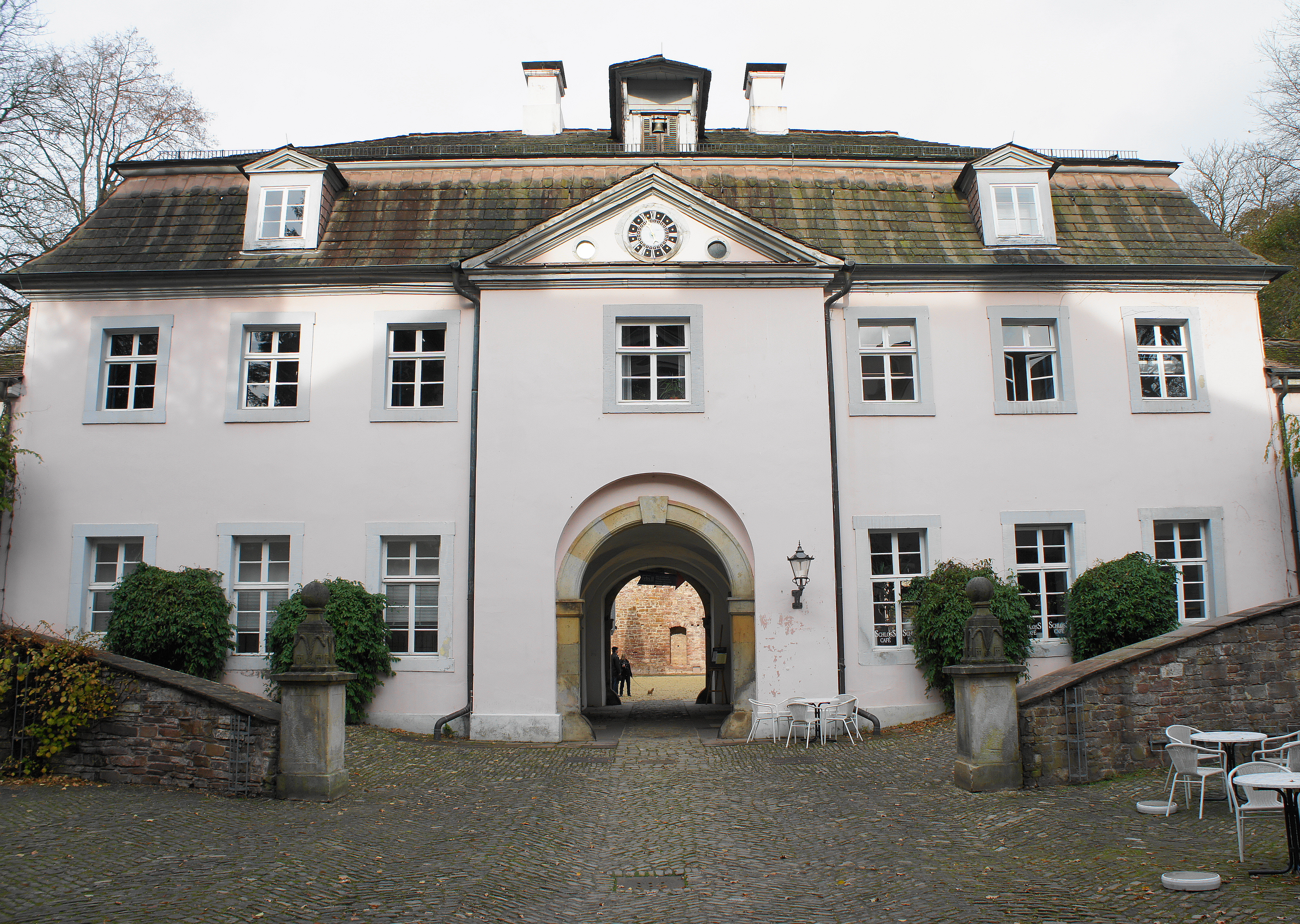
Commandant's house

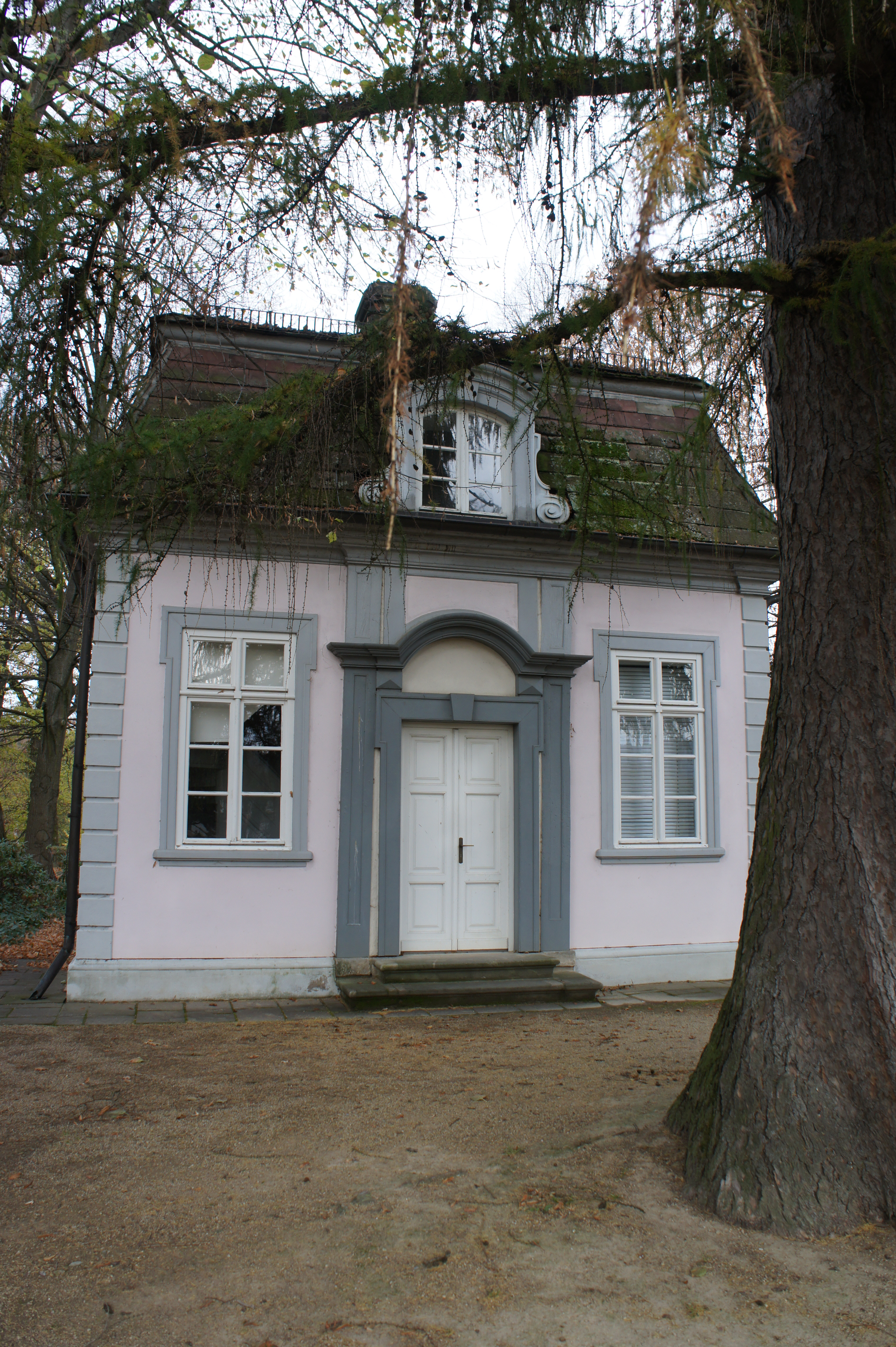
Cavalier house

== Literature ==
- Hans Härtel: Schloß Pyrmont (Große Baudenkmäler, Issue 171). 2nd edn., Munich/Berlin, 1972
- Karl Theodor Menke: Pyrmont und seine Umgebung. 2nd edition. Hameln and Pyrmont 1840, pp.128–134 (digitalised).
- Titus Malms: Belgische NS-Exilregierung im Schloss Pyrmont in: Deister- und Weserzeitung, 13 August 2005
