= Waldeck-Eisenberg =

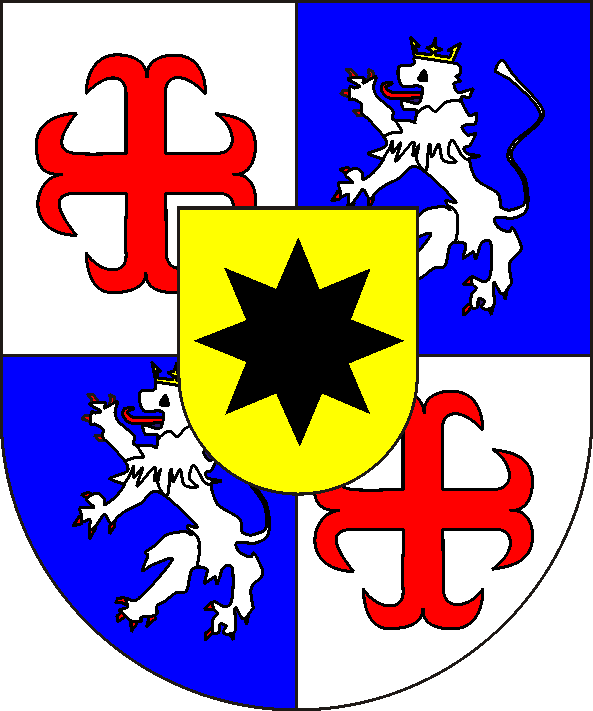
Coat of arms of Waldeck-Eisenberg

Waldeck-Eisenberg was a county and later principality in the Holy Roman Empire that belonged to the Upper Rhenish Circle.

== Waldeck-Eisenberg (1507-1598) ==
The principality of Waldeck-Eisenberg was created in 1507 when the principality of Waldeck was divided between Count Henry VIII and his uncle Philip II. Philip acquired Eisenberg, Mengeringhausen, Landau and the half of Rhoden, Wettenberg and Waldeck. The principality has been ruled by an old German House of Waldeck.

He also received a share of the Herrschaft Itter. Korbach was jointly ruled.

In 1538, Count Philip III divided the country among his two sons Wolrad II and John I. Wolrad was bestowed Eisenberg and John I got Landau.

Following the extinction of Waldeck-Landau in 1597 and Waldeck-Wildungen in 1598 Waldeck was reunited under the joint administration of the brothers Christian and Wolrad IV of Waldeck-Eisenberg.

== Waldeck-Eisenberg (1607-1692) ==
In 1607, Waldeck was divided again. Wolrad IV got Eisenberg and Christian got Wildungen thus the branches Eisenberg and Wildungen were once again created

In 1625, the county of Bad Pyrmont was inherited from the estate of the county Gleichen. Out of the same estate also came the hereditary herrschaft Tonna in Thuringia. This herrschaft was obtained in 1640 of Schenk of Tautenburg. In 1677, the Herrschaft Tonna was sold to the Duchy of Saxe-Gotha.

As a result of the marriage of Count Wolrad IV and Anna of Baden-Durlach in 1639 the county of Culemborg, the imperial county Wittem and the heerlijkheid Werth were inherited.

On June 1, 1682, Count Georg Friedrich was elevated to Prince of the Holy Roman Empire. Because he had no sons, with his death came an end to his regal title. His daughter Henriette inherited the County of Culemborg and the Herrschaft Werth. Her sister Elizabeth Albertine inherited Wittem. Waldeck-Eisenberg reverted to Waldeck-Wildungen and thus reuniting Waldeck forever.
