= Wolrad II of Waldeck-Eisenberg =

German count (1509–1578)

Wolrad II, Count of Waldeck-Eisenberg
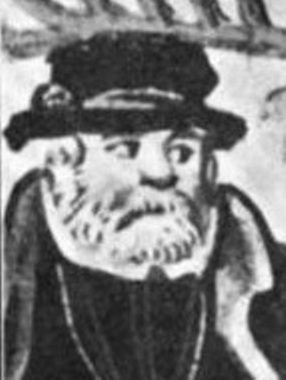
- Count Wolrad II of Waldeck-Eisenberg.

Count of Waldeck-Eisenberg
- Coat of arms
- Reign: 1539–1578
- Predecessor: Philip III
- Successor: Josias I
- Full name: Wolrad II Count of Waldeck-Eisenberg
- Native name: Wolrad II. Graf von Waldeck-Eisenberg
- Born: Wolrad Graf von Waldeck-Eisenberg; 27 March 1509
- Died: 15 April 1578 (aged 69); Eilhausen
- Buried: 20 April 1578; Saint Kilian Church, Korbach
- Noble family: House of Waldeck
- Spouse: Anastasia Günthera of Schwarzburg-Blankenburg
- Issue Detail: Josias I; Wolrad III
- Father: Philip III of Waldeck-Eisenberg
- Mother: Adelaide of Hoya
- Occupation: Canon of St. Gereon's Basilica, Cologne 1520–1544

Count Wolrad II "the Scholar" of Waldeck-Eisenberg (27 March 1509 – 15 April 1578), German: Wolrad II. 'der Gelehrte' Graf von Waldeck-Eisenberg, was Count of Waldeck-Eisenberg from 1539.

By Wolrad and his relatives from the cadet branches, the Reformation in the County of Waldeck was almost completed. They defied the Emperor, had to fight for pardon, but remained Protestant and enforced the Reformation in their county. In the process, Wolrad took a leading position in the spiritual field.

== Biography ==
Wolrad was born on 27 March 1509 (Note: The sources do not mention a place of birth.) as the second son of Count Philip III of Waldeck-Eisenberg and his first wife Countess Adelaide of Hoya. Initially, Wolrad was not on the side of the Reformation. His father sent him to the court in Kassel, where the young Landgrave Philip I of Hesse also studied. Then Wolrad studied in Bielefeld and at the court of the Prince-bishop Érard de la Marck in Liège. He travelled through France and learned to speak French perfectly. He mastered Latin and Greek. His extensive education later earned him the nickname 'the Scholar'.

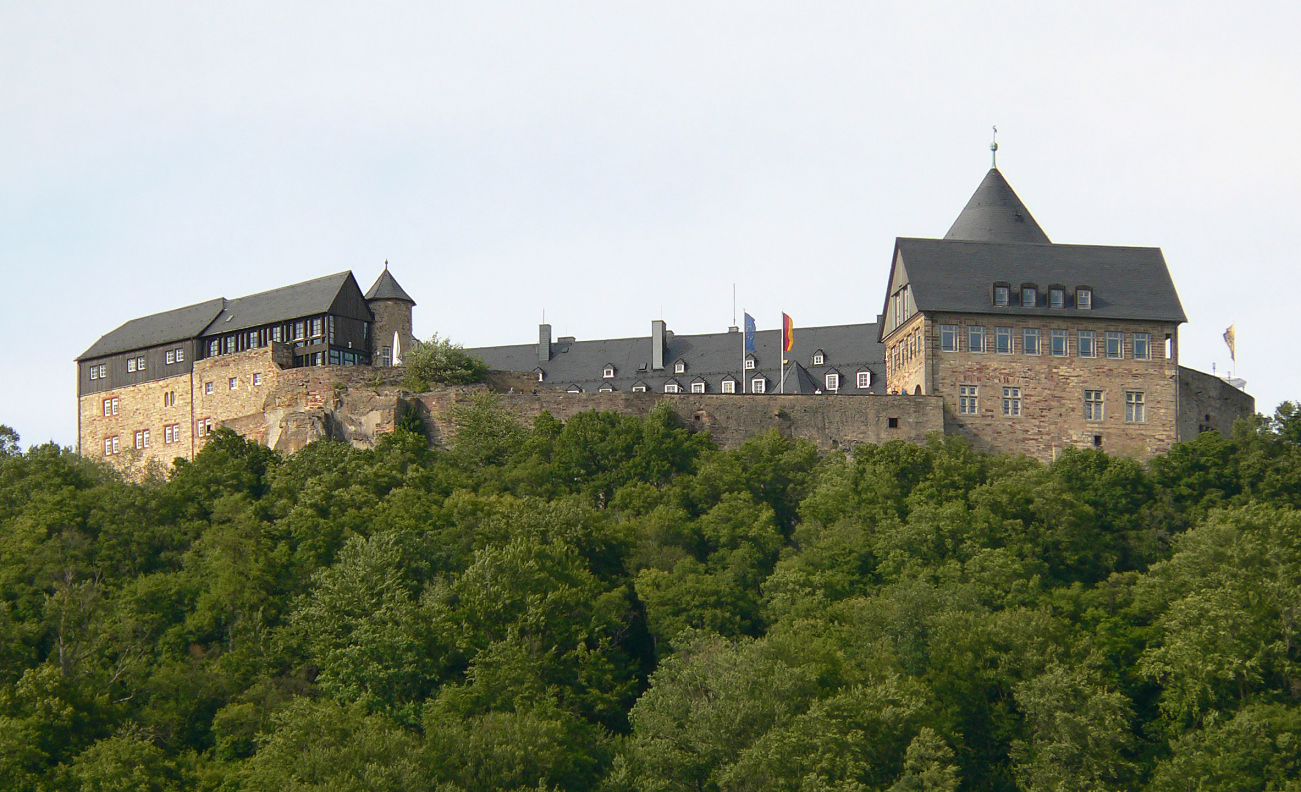
Waldeck Castle. Photo: Axel Hindemith, 2012.

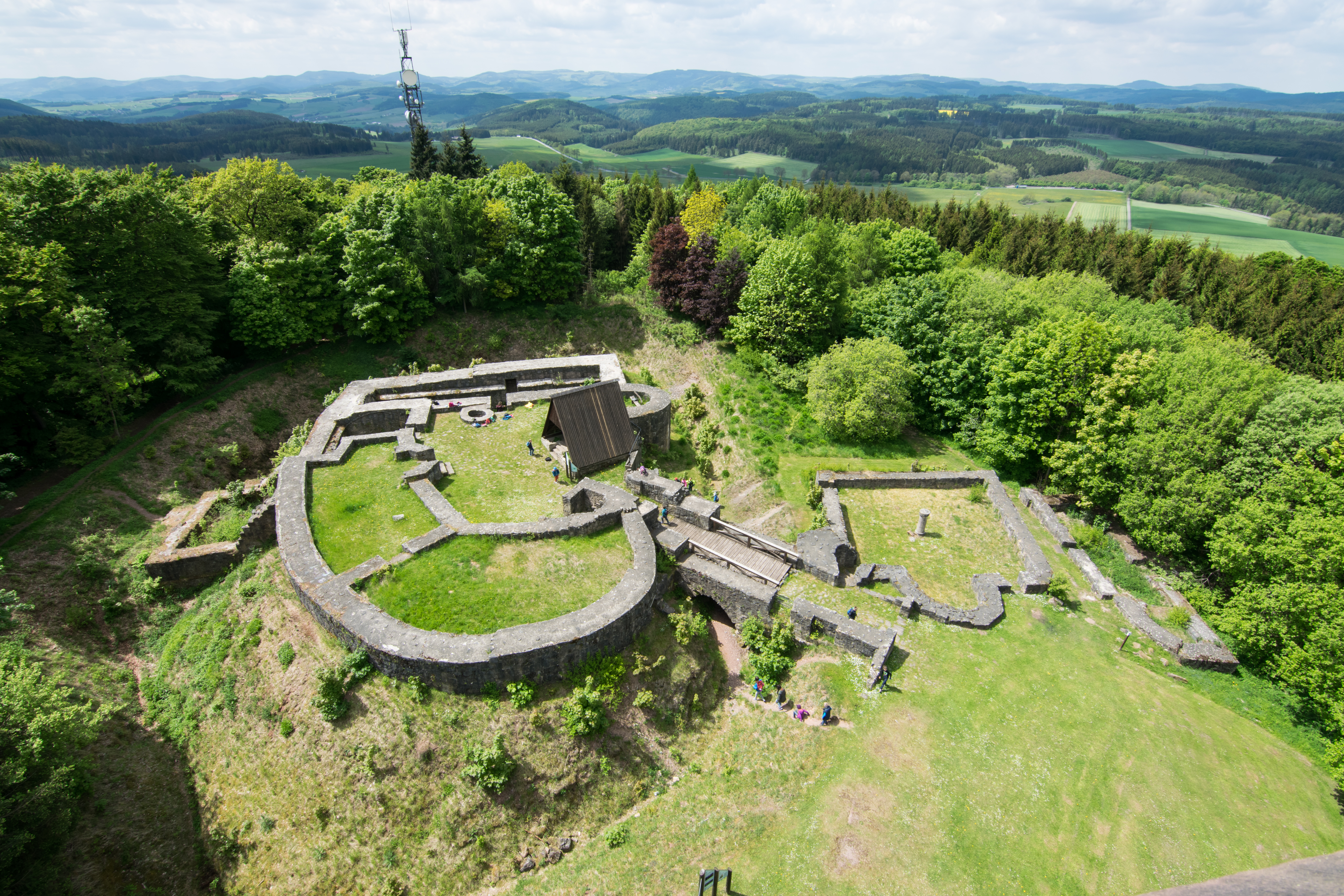
The ruins of Eisenberg Castle, 2015.

Wolrad was first a clergyman and from 1520 he was canon of St. Gereon's Basilica in Cologne, but in 1544 he resigned that position in favour of his half-brother Philip V. His ailing father called Wolrad back to the county as early as 1536 to help with the administration. With the cooperation of Landgrave Philip I of Hesse, the division of the County of Waldeck was arranged by treaty on 22 November 1538. One part was awarded to the two sons of the first marriage, Wolrad and Otto V, the other to the sons of the second marriage, Philip V, John I and Francis II. By the succession treaty Wolrad and his brother Otto obtained among others half of Waldeck Castle and half of the city of Waldeck – the other half was owned by Count Philip IV of Waldeck-Wildungen – and several villages of the district of the same name, Eisenberg Castle and Eilhausen Castle with villages, the paternal part of Sachsenhausen, Sachsenberg and Naumburg as well as Korbach and the Freigrafschaft Düdinghausen. After the death of his father in 1539, Wolrad took possession of it because his brother Otto renounced it and joined the Order of Saint John. Wolrad's Residenz was Eisenberg Castle, which he and his son Josias later expanded.

Although by 1529 the Protestant faith was widespread in most parts of the County of Waldeck, the churches and some influential citizens still remained Catholic, especially in Korbach, where the Counts of Waldeck did not manage to eliminate the religious differences. In May 1543 they brought in the Protestant Reformer Adam Krafft, who completed the Reformation in the County of Waldeck.

Because of his excellent education, Landgrave Philip I took Count Wolrad II with him as an auditor at the Regensburger Religionsgespräch in 1546. This meeting served Emperor Charles V as a distraction from his war preparations against the Reformation. On the other hand, the Schmalkaldic League, which was founded in 1531 under the leadership of Elector John Frederick I of Saxony and Landgrave Philip I by representatives of Protestant regions and cities, was preparing itself. The two leaders of the League decided to thwart the Emperor and formed an army in the middle of 1546. The Counts of Waldeck responded to the landgrave's call for support. The Emperor emerged victorious from the Schmalkaldic War on 24 April 1547 at the Battle of Mühlberg. Of the Counts of Waldeck, only Count Samuel of Waldeck-Wildungen, son of Count Philip IV, had participated; but the other Counts of Waldeck also had to come to Kassel to sign the reconciliation treaty, which the Emperor presented on 16 July 1547 to the surrendering landgrave. The subjects and servants of Hesse were also ordered to sign the treaty. Count John I of Waldeck-Landau had already signed it, his relatives followed. But the Emperor did not accept the reconciliation in the case of the Counts of Waldeck. For him they were not subjects of Hesse, but Imperial Counts and therefore immediately subordinate to him. Therefore, he summoned them under threat of the imperial ban to the Diet of Augsburg in 1548, so that they would answer for their participation in the army of the Schmalkaldic League and reconcile with him. What on the one hand had the character of a humiliation for the counts, on the other hand weakened the landgraves of Hesse and their territorial claims to the County of Waldeck. Waldeck was thus explicitly immediate.

Wolrad travelled to Augsburg with his half brothers Philip V, who as a Catholic clergyman had been on the side of the Protestants, and John I, as well as with Samuel, who had not been summoned at all. After Wolrad arrived in Augsburg on 14 April 1548, weeks passed by during which the Counts of Waldeck sought – and finally found – advocates. At the end of May, however, the Emperor declared that an apology was not enough for him. Philip and John had to pay him 5,000 guilders, Wolrad even 8,000, because he had turned against the Emperor in word and deed more than the other counts, so it was said. They were forced to waive substantial financial claims. Wolrad had a hard time getting the money together, partly by pledging, through relatives and his subjects. On top of that he had to pay for his travelling expenses and stay in Augsburg – more than 2,000 guilders. He also pledged his share of Waldeck Castle. The Emperor resented Wolrad's participation in the Regensburger Religionsgespräch. He had to wait a long time, held talks for intercession and had difficulties to be admitted to the Emperor. Charles finally granted him his mercy. On 22 June 1548 the Emperor drew up the pardon charter. The next day, after more than two months in Augsburg, Wolrad and Philip were able to return home. On 12 August the Emperor also issued a letter of protection for Countess Dowager Anne and for Wolrad, Philip and John. However, the counts did not give up Protestantism.

At the Imperial Diet, the Emperor issued the Interim – an Imperial law – to bridge the time until a general church council, which would have to include the Protestants in the Catholic Church. There was fierce resistance because it subjected the Protestants to the authority of bishops and the Pope again. Wolrad had his ministers meet on 14 August 1548 to hear their opinions and urged them not to deviate from the path of Protestantism. He assured them of his support. Only a few implemented the Interim. The Emperor withdrew it in 1552.

The weakening of Hesse as a result of the five-year imprisonment of Landgrave Philip I in the Netherlands and the high debts after the Schmalkaldic War caused the estates of the realm of Waldeck to turn away from Hesse. Confessionally the county was united, but administratively it was not. On 22 June 1549 the Reichskammergericht in Speyer decided that Hesse could not exempt Waldeck from its obligations towards the Emperor and the Empire and that the Counts of Waldeck, as immediate counts, had to pay the imperial taxes themselves. However, the collection of taxes from the estates of the realm was difficult and forced the long overdue improvement of the administration of the county.

The Counts of Waldeck had a tendency towards more independence after the Imperial and Religion Peace of Augsburg. To this end, the Imperial Estates had met in 1555. They agreed, among other things, that the respective territorial lord should determine the religion. The counts Wolrad II, Philip IV, John I and Samuel issued a church order in 1556 after a synod in Volkhardinghausen. Carefully and slowly they secularised the monasteries.

Wolrad moved his court to Eilhausen on 15 August 1577 – a few months before his death. His son Josias took over Eisenberg Castle. Wolrad died in Eilhausen on 15 April 1578 and was buried in Saint Kilian Church in Korbach on 20 April. He was succeeded by his oldest surviving son Josias.

== Marriage and issue ==
Wolrad married at Waldeck Castle on 6 June 1546 to Countess Anastasia Günthera of Schwarzburg-Blankenburg (Arnstadt, 31 March 1528 – Eisenberg Castle, 1 April 1570), daughter of Count Henry XXXII of Schwarzburg-Blankenburg and Countess Catherine of Henneberg-Schleusingen. Anastasia Günthera was buried on 5 April 1570 in the Saint Kilian Church in Korbach.

From the marriage of Wolrad and Anastasia Günthera the following children were born:

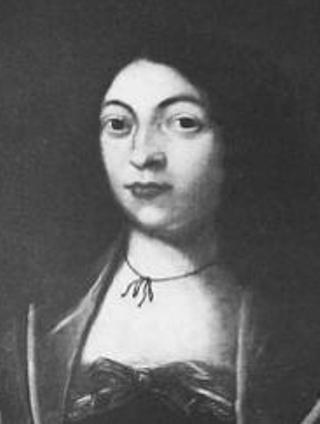
Anne Erica of Waldeck-Eisenberg (1551–1611).

1. Catherine (Waldeck Castle, 20 September 1547 – Schaaken Abbey, 16 June 1613), was since 1588 Abbess of Schaaken Abbey.
2. Francis (Korbach, 8 April 1549 – Waldeck Castle, 7 March 1552).
3. Elizabeth (Waldeck Castle, 27/28 June 1550 – Waldeck Castle, 6 March 1552).
4. Anne Erica (Korbach, 17 September 1551 – Arolsen, 15 October 1611), was since 1589 Abbess of Gandersheim Abbey.
5. Henry William (Waldeck Castle, 3 November 1552 – 28 December 1559).
6. Count Josias I (Eisenberg Castle, 18 March 1554 – Eisenberg Castle, 6 August 1588), succeeded his father as Count of Waldeck-Eisenberg in 1578. Married in 1582 to Countess Mary of Barby and Mühlingen (Magdeburg, 8 April 1563 – Waldeck Castle, 19/29 December 1619).
7. Adelaide Walpurga (Eisenberg Castle, 11 September 1555 – Eisenberg Castle, 17 June 1570).
8. Amelia (Eilhausen, 28 February 1558 – Eisenberg Castle, 18 March 1562).
9. John Günther (Eisenberg Castle, 13 July 1559 – Eisenberg Castle, 19 November 1559).
10. Jutta (Eisenberg Castle, 12 November 1560 – 1620), married on Eisenberg Castle in 1583 to Lord Henry XVIII of Reuss-Obergreiz (Glauchau, 25 July 1561 – Greiz, 8 February 1607).
11. Magdalene Lucy (Eisenberg Castle, 16 February 1562 – Arolsen, 1 April 1621).
12. Count Wolrad III (Waldeck Castle, 16 June 1563 – Anneau, 12 November 1587), served in the army of Count Palatine John Casimir.
13. Catherine Anastasia (Eisenberg Castle, 20 March 1566 – Arolsen, 8 February 1635), married on 18 October 1585 to Count Wolfgang of Löwenstein-Scharfeneck (? – 29 November 1596).

== Ancestors ==
Ancestors of Count Wolrad II of Waldeck-Eisenberg
Great-great-grandparents	Henry VII of Waldeck-Waldeck (?–after 1442) ⚭ 1398; Margaret of Nassau-Wiesbaden-Idstein (?–after 1432)	Michael I of Wertheim (?–1441) ⚭ 1413; Sophie of Henneberg-Aschach (?–1441)	John of Solms-Braunfels (?–1457) ⚭ ca. 1429; Elisabeth of Cronberg (?–1438)	John IV of Salm (?–1476) ⚭ 1432; Elisabeth of Hanau-Münzenberg (?–1446)	Otto II of Hoya (?–1428) ⚭ Mechteld of Brunswick-Wolfenbüttel (?–1433)	Konrad IV of Rietberg (?–1428) ⚭ Irmgard of Diepholz (?–1426)	Simon IV of Lippe (1404–1429) ⚭ ca. 1426; Margaret of Brunswick-Grubenhagen (1411–after 1456)	Otto II of Holstein-Schaumburg (1400–1464) ⚭ 1418; Elisabeth of Honstein-Lohra-Klettenburg (1400–1474)
Great-grandparents	Wolrad I of Waldeck-Waldeck (1407–1475) ⚭ 1440; Barbara of Wertheim (?–?)		Cuno of Solms-Lich (?–1477) ⚭ 1457; Walpurgis of Dhaun (?–?)		Otto III of Hoya (?–1455) ⚭ Adelaide of Rietberg (?–1459)		Bernhard VII of Lippe (1429–1511) ⚭ 1452; Anne of Holstein-Schaumburg (1430–1495)	
Grandparents	Philip II of Waldeck-Eisenberg (1452/53–1524) ⚭ 1481; Catherine of Solms-Lich (?–1492)				Otto IV of Hoya (1425–1497) ⚭ Anne of Lippe (1452–1533)			
Parents	Philip III of Waldeck-Eisenberg (1486–1539) ⚭ 1503; Adelaide of Hoya (1475–1513)							

== Literature ==
- Rocholl, Rudolf (1865). Graf Wolrad von Waldeck. Ein Beitrag zur Reformationsgeschichte (in German). Hannover: Carl Meyer.
- Schultze, Victor (1903). Waldeckische Reformationsgeschichte (in German). Leipzig: Deichert.
- Schultze, Victor (1910). "Das Tagebuch des Grafen Wolrad II. zu Waldeck zum Regensburger Religionsgespräch 1546". Archiv für Reformationsgeschichte (in German). 7 (2). Gütersloher Verlagshaus: 135–184.
- Tross, C.L.P. (1861). Des Grafen Wolrad von Waldeck Tagebuch während des Reichstages zu Augsburg 1548. Bibliothek des litterarischen Vereins in Stuttgart (in German). Vol. LIX. Stuttgart.
- Varnhagen, Johann Adolf Theodor Ludwig (1853). Grundlage der Waldeckischen Landes- und Regentengeschichte (in German). Vol. Zweiter Band. Arolsen: Verlag der Speyer'schen Buchhandlung.

== Sources ==
- Behr, Kamill (1854). Genealogie der in Europa regierenden Fürstenhäuser (in German). Leipzig: Verlag von Bernhard Tauchnitz.
- von Ehrenkrook, Hans Friedrich; Förster, Karl & Marchtaler, Kurt Erhard (1928). Ahnenreihen aus allen deutschen Gauen. Beilage zum Archiv für Sippenforschung und allen verwandten Gebieten (in German). Görlitz: Verlag für Sippenforschung und Wappenkunde C.A. Starke.
- Haarmann, Torsten (2014). Das Haus Waldeck und Pyrmont. Mehr als 900 Jahre Gesamtgeschichte mit Stammfolge. Deutsche Fürstenhäuser (in German). Vol. Heft 35. Werl: Börde-Verlag. ISBN 978-3-981-4458-2-4.
- Hoffmeister, Jacob Christoph Carl (1883). Historisch-genealogisches Handbuch über alle Grafen und Fürsten von Waldeck und Pyrmont seit 1228 (in German). Cassel: Verlag Gustav Klaunig.
- Huberty, Michel; Giraud, Alain & Magdelaine, F. & B. (1987). l'Allemagne Dynastique (in French). Vol. Tome V: Hohenzollern-Waldeck-Familles alliées A-B. Le Perreux-sur-Marne: Alain Giraud.

Wolrad II of Waldeck-Eisenberg House of Waldeck Born: 27 March 1509 Died: 15 April 1578
Preceded by Philip III	Count of Waldeck-Eisenberg; 20 June 1539 – 15 April 1578	Succeeded by Josias I
