= Eisenberg Castle, Korbach =

Eisenberg Castle
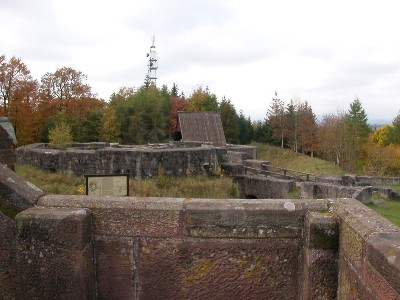
- Interactive map of the Eisenberg Castle area

General information
- Location: Korbach, Germany
- Coordinates: 51.251111°N 8.826667°E

Eisenberg Castle (German: Burg Eisenberg) is a ruin near the German town of Korbach in Hesse.

The castle was founded in the 14th century, but the names of the founders are no longer known. In the 15th century the castle was acquired by the House of Waldeck. From 1487 on the castle was inhabited by the Eisenberg branch of the House of Waldeck; the Eisenberg line went extinct in 1692, and the last resident of the castle was Heinrich Wolrad, circa 1664.
