= John II of Ziegenhain =

Last ruling Count of Ziegenhain and Nidda (1401–1450)

John II, Count of Ziegenhain
- Died: 14 February 1450
- Buried: Church of Haina Abbey
- Noble family: House of Ziegenhain
- Spouse: Elisabeth of Waldeck
- Father: Gottfried VIII, Count of Ziegenhain
- Mother: Agnes of Brunswick

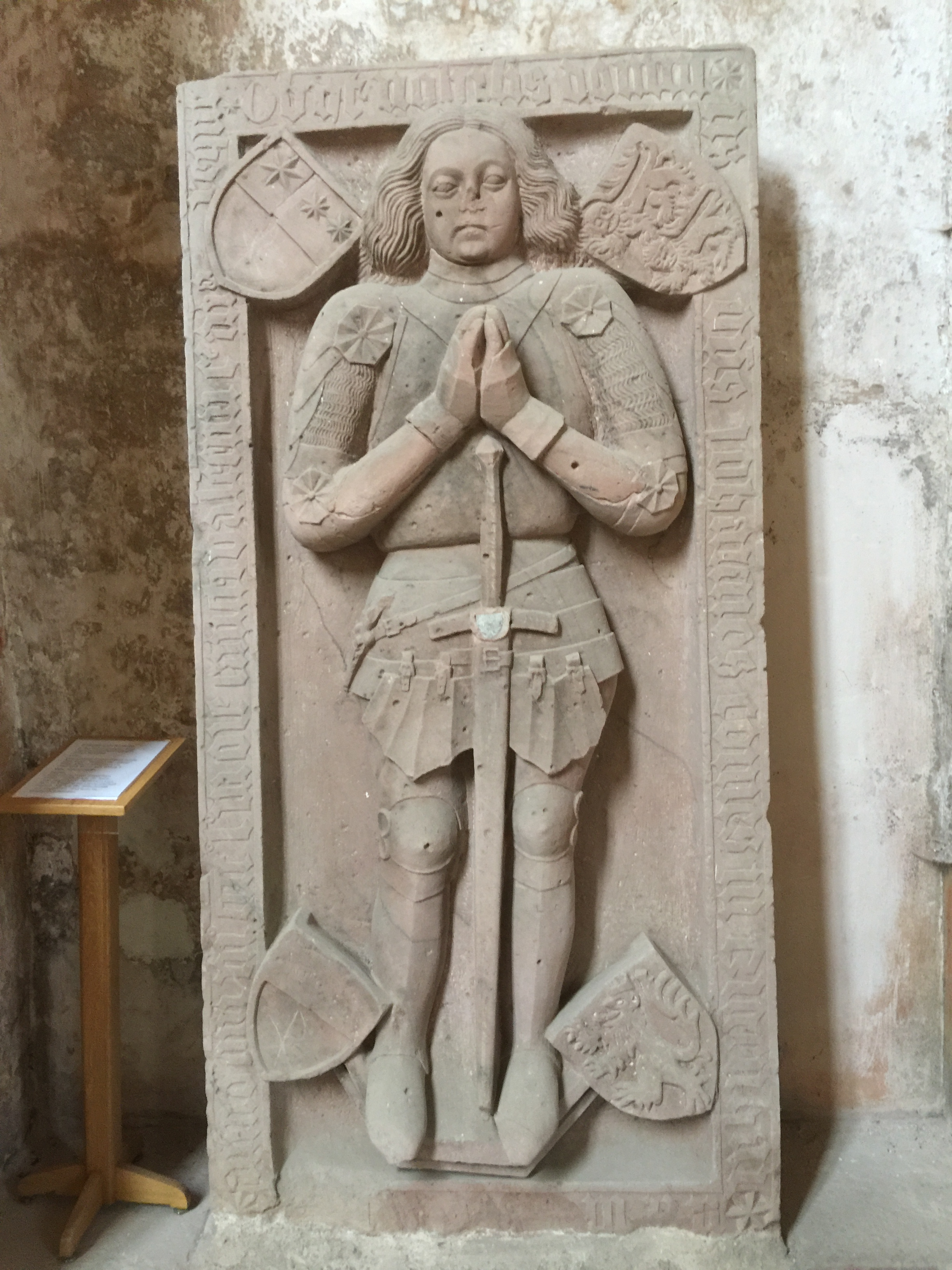
Johann II, as depicted on his tomb in the monastery church of Haina.

John II, Count of Ziegenhain (died 14 February 1450) was the second son of Count Gottfried VIII of Ziegenhain and his wife Agnes of Brunswick. He was the last reigning Count of Ziegenhain and Nidda. He probably owed His nickname the Strong to his obesity, although he is said to have possessed an extraordinary muscle strength as a young man. His younger brother Otto was Archbishop of Trier from 1419 until his death in 1430.

== Life ==
John initially pursued an ecclesiastical career. Between 1393 and 1406, he was canon in Trier and from 1403, he was a canon of Mainz. In 1394, he studied in Vienna and in 1396 in Heidelberg. After the early death of his elder brother Engelbert III in 1401, he succeeded as Count of Ziegenhain and Nidda.

On 5 January 1417, he married Countess Elisabeth of Waldeck. This marriage remained childless.

== Reign ==
In the war between Hesse and the Electorate of Mainz (1401–1405), John II supported Mainz. In 1401, he was taken prisoner by Landgrave Herman II of Hesse. He was released in January 1402, after he had promised to not act against Hesse in this conflict, and his brother Gottfried IX had promised the same.

In 1414 John II and Gottfried IX were outlawed for their involvement in a violent feud against Siegfried of Frekenhausen. In 1415, they took Lißberg Castle by force, claiming that it was a fief of Ziegenhain and that it had reverted to them when Frederick of Lißberg had died in 1396 and that Frederick's cousin John of Rodenstein had unlawfully taken possession of the castle. In 1418, they sold a 50% share of the castle to Landgrave Louis I of Hesse.

In 1420 John II gave his allodial property in the Counties of Ziegenhain and Nidda to Emperor Sigismund. In return, Sigismund enfeoffed him with the County and City of Nidda and its castle, plus the County of Ziegenhain with all the cities, villages and castles it contained and two tolls at Treysa and Gemünden. This exchange made him an imperial count, since he now held his county directly from the Emperor. Thus, he had a much stronger than before, when his feudal overlord had been the abbot of Fulda. However, his weakening of his relationship with Fulda also increased the appetite of Hesse and Mainz, who were interested in his possessions, considering that he had no male heir.

Landgrave Louis I of Hesse decisively won the Mainz-Hesse War of 1427 with a victory against Mainz' commander Gottfried of Leiningen in the Battle on the Großenenglise Plateau near Fritzlar on July 23 and against Archbishop Conrad III himself at Fulda on August 10, Louis established his territorial supremacy in Upper and Lower Hesse. This meant that Ziegenhain could no longer lean on Mainz to retain its independence from Hesse. Instead, John II concluded a defensive alliance with Hesse on 29 June 1428, that made Ziegenhain virtually a Hessian dependency. This brought Hesse much closer to its goal of annexing Ziegenhain and thereby connecting Upper and Lower Hesse geographically.

In 1434, the Abbot of Fulda John of Merlau enfeoffed Louis I of Hesse with Fulda's share of the County of Nidda. On 2 February 1437, John II enfeoffed Louis I with his two counties. His feudal overlords, the abbots of Fulda and Hersfeld approved this contract and sold their shares of the two counties to Hesse (Ziegenhain and Nidda were partly allodial possessions of the House of Ziegenhain, partly imperial fiefs, partly fiefs held from Fulda and partly fief held from Hersfeld. However, the contract specified that Hessian rule in John's counties would only begin after his death.

John II died on 14 February 1450. He was probably buried in the church of Haina Abbey.

== Succession dispute ==
Despite treaties between John II and Landgrave Louis I of Hesse that had been confirmed several times between 1437 and 1450, a long and bitter dispute about his inheritance broke out after his death. The tho claimants were:

- Landgrave Louis I of Hesse, who proclaimed that Ziegenhain and Nidda were completed Hessian fiefs, and who occupied the territory militarily.
- The Counts of Hohenlohe, who based their claim on the fact that Albert I of Hohenlohe had married Elisabeth of Hanau, who was a granddaughter of Count Gottfried VIII of Ziegenhain via her mother, Elisabeth of Ziegenhain, who had married Lord Ulrich V of Hanau.

Albert's sons Albert II and Kraft V were enfeoffed on 14 May 1450 by Emperor Frederick III with the part of Ziegenhain that was an imperial fief. They were thereby raised to imperial counts. Louis I ignored this enfeoffment and occupied the territory. The dispute lasted until 1495. After several armed conflicts and court cases, Hesse won, but only after Landgrave William II had paid the Counts of Hohenlohe 9000 guilders in compensation. The Ziegenhain territory has remained part of Hesse ever since, and members of the House of Hesse still use Count of Ziegenhain as one of their titles. However, the House of Hohenlohe retained the status of imperial counts, which they had obtained when they were enfeoffed with Ziegenhain, and they included the six-pointed start of Ziegenhain in their coat of arms.
