= Neda =

Neda may refer to:

== People ==
- Neda (given name)
- Musaed Neda (born 1983), Kuwaiti footballer
- Neda (musician), Australian singer-songwriter Tenielle Neda (born 1987)

== Places ==
- Neda, Galicia, Spain, a municipality
- Neda, Wisconsin, United States, an unincorporated community
- Neda Formation, a geologic formation in Illinois, United States
- Neda (river), Greece

== Organizations ==
- National Eating Disorders Association, United States
- National Economic and Development Authority, Philippines
- National Educational Debate Association, United States
- National Electronic Distributors Association, United States
- North-East Democratic Alliance, a political coalition in northeast India

== Other uses ==
- Neda (mythology), a nymph in Greek mythology
- Neda (beetle), a genus of beetle in family Coccinellidae

== See also ==
- Nedda, a name
- Nela (name)
