= Peter Halm =

German etcher

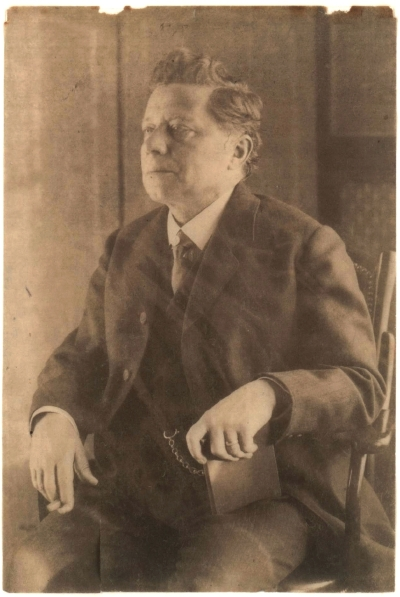
Peter Halm (1914)

Peter Ignaz Johann Halm, later Von Halm (14 December 1854, Mainz – 25 January 1923, Munich), was a German etcher who served as a professor of etching at the Academy of Fine Arts, Munich, from 1901 to 1923.

== Biography ==
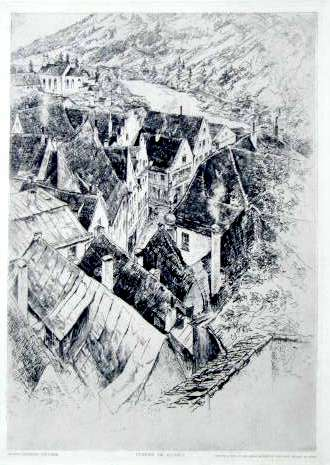
Füssen, Bavaria

He was the son of an innkeeper and brewer. Initially, he wanted to become an architect and, in pursuit of that goal, attended the Technische Universität Darmstadt. After 1875, he studied copper engraving with Johann Leonhard Raab and general art subjects with Ludwig von Löfftz, at the Munich Academy.

From 1883 to 1885, he lived in Berlin at the invitation of his friend, Karl Stauffer-Bern, where he created graphic versions of the Old Masters for Wilhelm von Bode, Director of the Berlin State Museums. His younger brother, Philipp Maria Halm (later an art historian), came under his tutelage during this time.

In 1893, he married Katharina Müller (1873–1953), the daughter of a wealthy leather merchant, and they had three sons.

He began teaching at the Munich Academy in 1896. Five years later, he was named a Professor there and eventually took over the management of the classes taught by his former mentor, Raab. His students there included René Beeh, Willi Geiger, Hugo Steiner-Prag, Hermann Kätelhön, Max Brüning and Walter Bud.

In late 1922, he became seriously ill and tendered his resignation, effective Jan. 1, 1923. He died three weeks later. A complete collection of his graphic works is maintained at the Staatliche Graphische Sammlung München. Most are landscapes and village scenes.

His son, Georg was a well known economist.

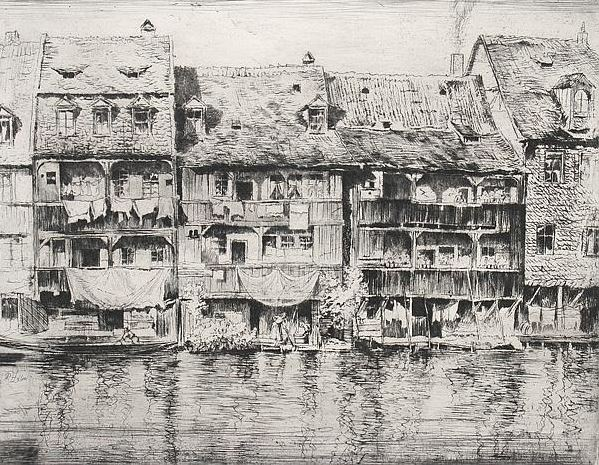
Little Venice, Bamberg
