= Gottfried VIII of Ziegenhain =

German nobleman (1350–1394)

Gottfried VIII, Count of Ziegenhain
- Coat of arms of the von Ziegenhain family
- Born: after 1350
- Died: 1394
- Noble family: House of Ziegenhain
- Spouse: Agnes of Brunswick-Göttingen
- Father: Gottfried VII of Ziegenhain and Nidda
- Mother: Agnes of Falkenstein

Gottfried VIII, Count of Ziegenhain (after 1350 – 1394) was a German nobleman. He was the ruling Count of Ziegenhain and Nidda from 1372 until his death. He is best known as the leader of the Star League, an alliance of local nobles against the Landgraves Henry II and Herman II of Hesse.

== Background ==
He was the son of Count Gottfried VII (d. October 1372) and his wife Agnes of Falkenstein. His parents had married in 1349. No record exists of his birth, nor of an elder brother. He is, however, mentioned in a document dated 28 December 1355, in which Emperor Charles IV states that he has asked Pope Innocent VI to appoint Gottfried, the son of Count Gottfried of Ziegenhain, as a canon in Mainz. In those days, an ecclesiastical career was usually planned for younger sons, while the eldest brother would inherit the county. This would suggest Gottfried had an elder brother. This hypothetical brother must have died young, as in 1360 Gottfried VIII is mentioned as the only son of Gottfried VII.

Gottfried VIII was knighted on 14 March 1371.
