= Carl Bantzer =

German painter (1857–1941)

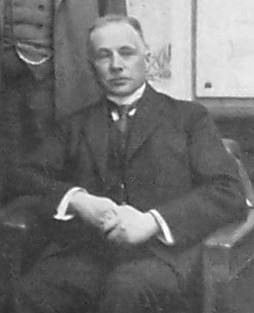
Carl Bantzer (1912)

Carl Ludwig Noah Bantzer (6 August 1857 – 19 December 1941) was a painter, professor and art critic; associated with the Willingshausen Artists' Colony.

== Biography ==
He was born in Ziegenhain to Heinrich Bantzer (1809–1863), a veterinarian. After his father's death, his mother moved the family to Marburg, where he attended the prestigious Gymnasium Philippinum. Later, he studied at the Academy of Arts, Berlin. In 1884 and 1885 he was in Schwalm, where he worked with the painter Wilhelm Claudius, from Dresden. He also spent time in Treysa, painting portraits of local notables and people in traditional costume.

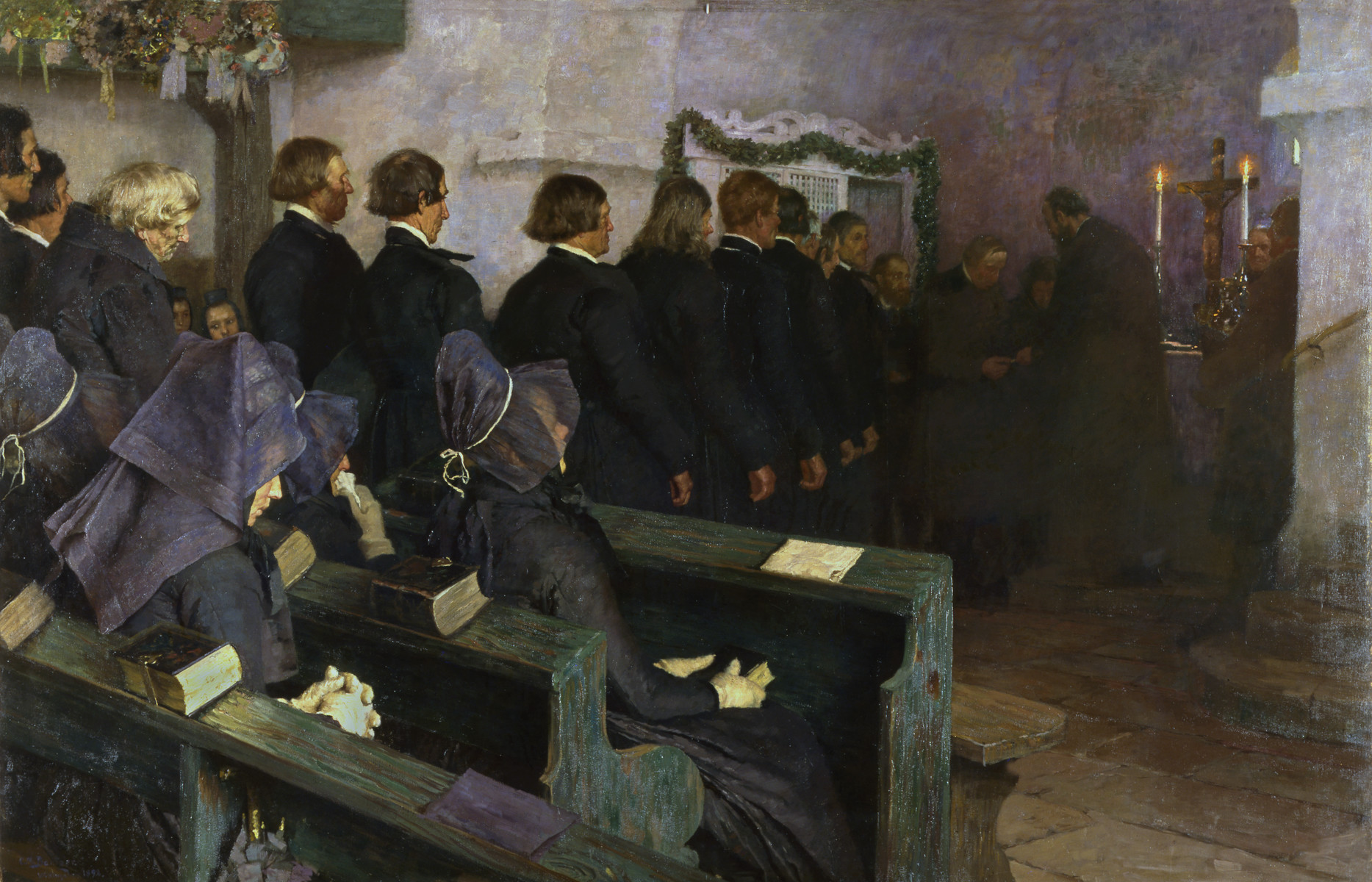
Communion in Hesse

His first wife, Claire, died in 1887, giving birth to their son Arnold. After her death, he went to Willingshausen, where he befriended the artists Hermann Kätelhön and Adolf Lins. He would return there every summer for many years. In 1890, he stayed in Paris for several months. The following year, he was in Dresden.

In 1893, he went on an extended study trip with Wilhelm Georg Ritter, visiting spas throughout central Germany, including Heilbad Heiligenstadt, Bad Sooden-Allendorf and Bad Hersfeld, as well as Schlitz, Aufenau, Kinzig and Vogelsberg. Having failed to find any suitable models for his work, he returned to Willingshausen. In 1896, he had an old wooden church disassembled and reconstructed in Marburg, to use as a studio. That same year, he was appointed a Professor at the Dresden Academy of Fine Arts.

He remarried in 1899, to Helene Francis Darbishire (1874–1953). This marriage produced five children, including Marigard Bantzer, an illustrator of children's books who married the cartoonist known as E. O. Plauen, and Carl Francis Bantzer (1900–1945), who also became a painter. Carl Francis, in turn, was the father of the actor, Christoph Bantzer, and the musician, Claus Bantzer.

From 1903, he was a member of the Deutscher Künstlerbund In 1904, he participated in their first join exhibition with the Munich Secession at the Staatliche Antikensammlungen. In 1909, Kurt Schwitters became one of his students.

In 1918, he was appointed Director of the Kunsthochschule Kassel, a position he held until 1923. He was awarded the Goethe-Medaille für Kunst und Wissenschaft in 1937. At that time, the awards were personally chosen by Hitler Two years later, he was a candidate for the German National Prize for Art and Science. He paid his last visit to Willingshausen just before his death, in 1941 in Marburg.

A school in Ziegenhain bears his name. In 2015, a statue of him, created by Ewald Rumpf, was erected in the schoolyard.

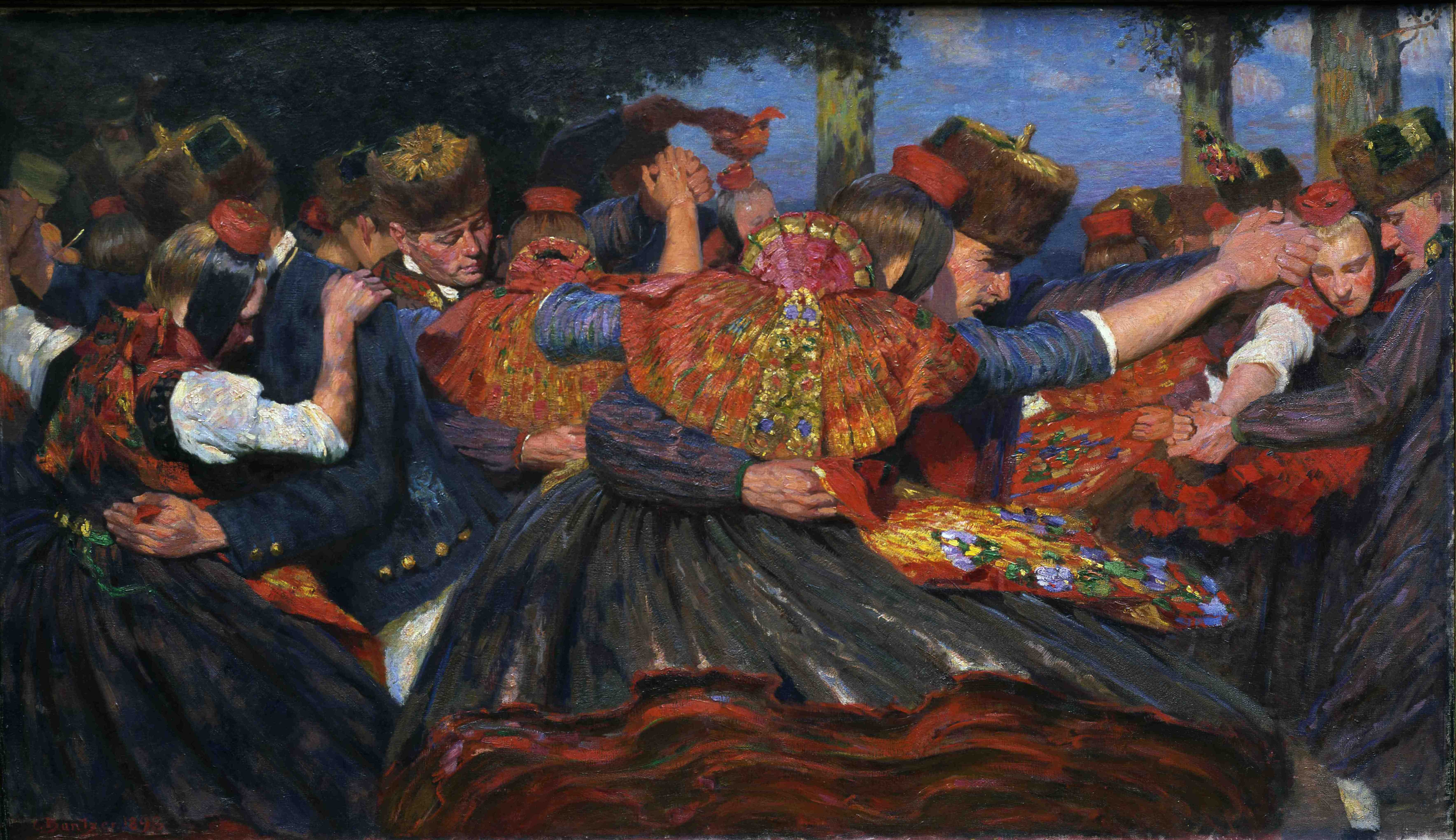
Dancing in Schwalm
