= Albin Schweri =

Swiss painter, glass painter, mosaicist and graphic designer (1885–1946)

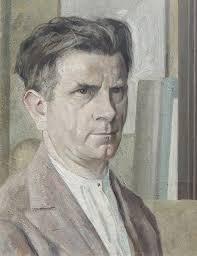
- Self-portrait 1922
- Born: 1 March 1885; Ramsen, Switzerland
- Died: 30 January 1946 (aged 60); Bern, Switzerland
- Education: Academy of Fine Arts, Munich
- Known for: Stained glass, Painting, Engraving

Philip Alfred Albin (Albinus) Schweri known as Albin Schweri (1 March 1885 – 30 January 1946) was a Swiss painter, glass painter, mosaicist and engraver.

== Biography ==
Schweri was born on 1 March 1885 in Ramsen. His parents were senior teachers and lived in Ramsen. At the early age, Schweri trained as an artist at the Zurich School of Applied Arts. In 1907 he entered the Academy of Fine Arts in Munich, where he attended the drawing school under the direction of Peter von Halms. He then worked as a figure draftsman in various German glass painting workshops in Frankfurt, Darmstadt and Wiesbaden during his studies in Munich between 1907 and 1909.

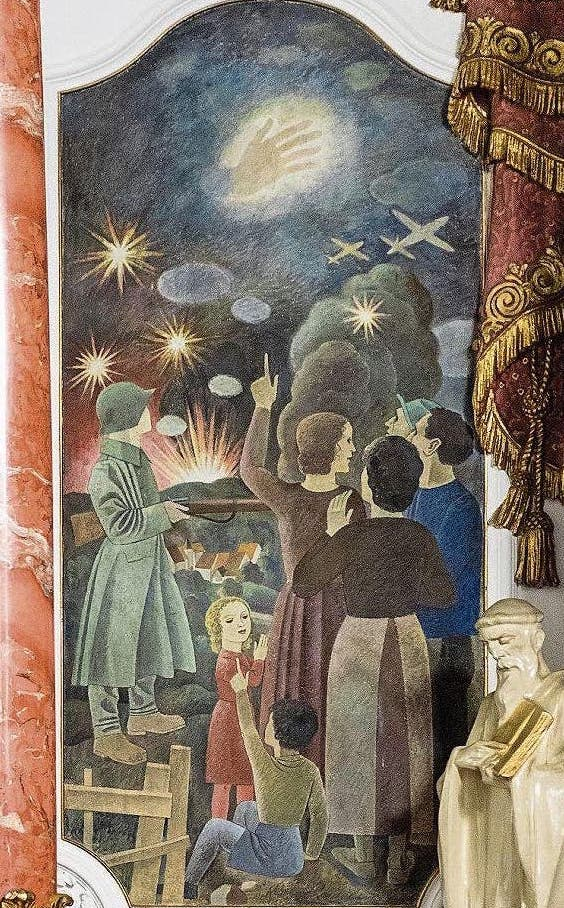
The protective hand in the sky, 1945

In 1922 he moved to Bern, the home of the glass painter Louis Halter, with whom he had been producing panes since 1918. His achievement, which made him famous in Switzerland, consisted in the resumption of the mediaeval techniques of glass painting. By 1944, Albin Schweri designed murals and mostly glass windows in over thirty churches.

Several churches have been decorated with paintings and stained glass windows by him, including the Ramsen Catholic Church, the side aisles of the Dreifaltigkeitskirche (Bern), the Marienkirche (Bern), the parish church Herz Jesu in Lungern, the side windows of the Saint-Martin Church (Saint-Imier) and the Way of the Cross in the church Brother Klaus in Zürich.

In the pilgrimage church Melchtal in Kerns, there is a wall fresco by Albin Schweri, painted in 1945, which shows the miracle named Die schützende Hand am Himmel in Baselland on the night of 13–14 May 1940: A soldier and astonished Waldenburgers look up to the sky, where the protective hand appears brightly shining. War bombers and combat fire point to the impending danger from the north.

== Works ==
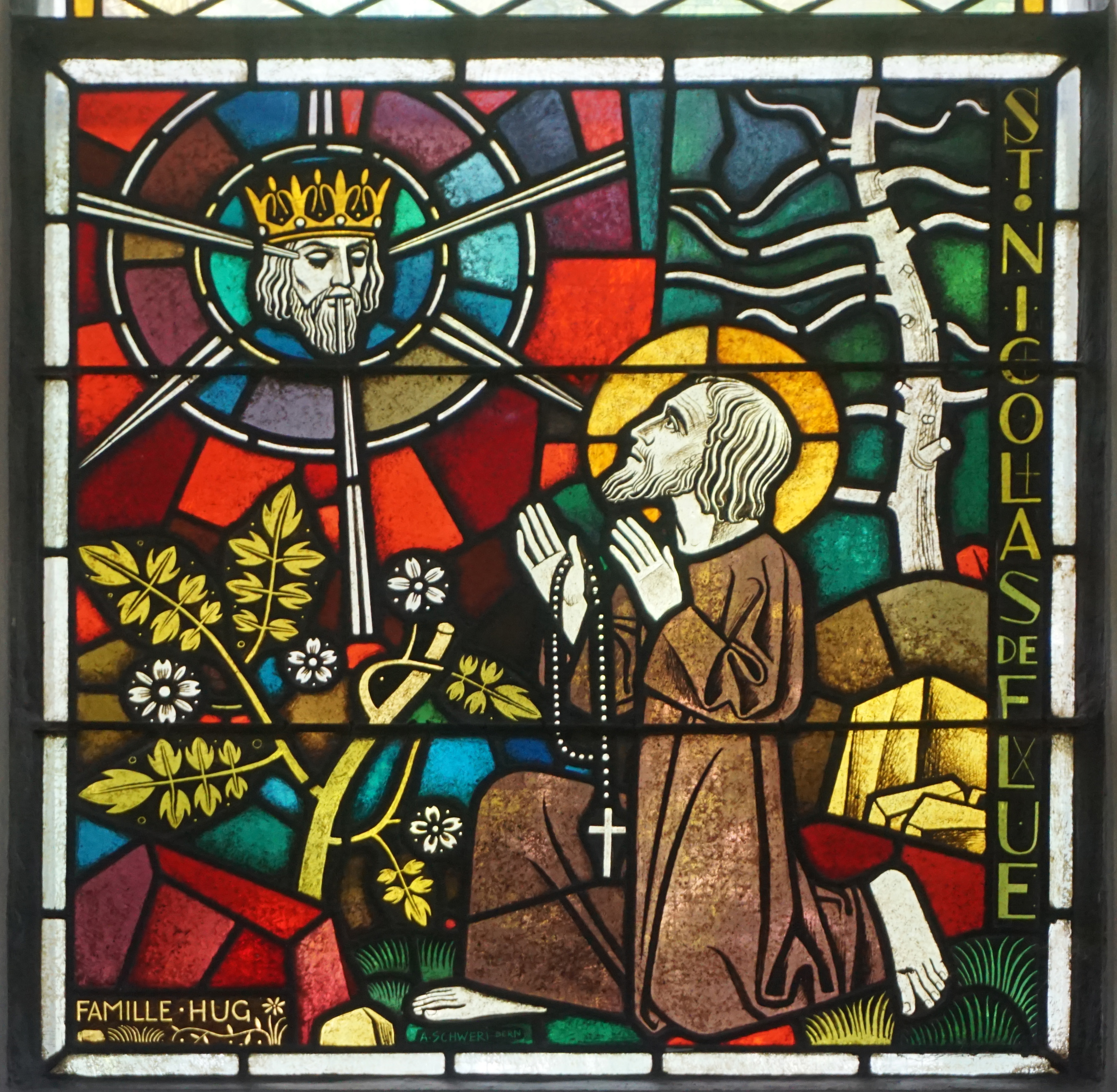
St Nikolas de Flue

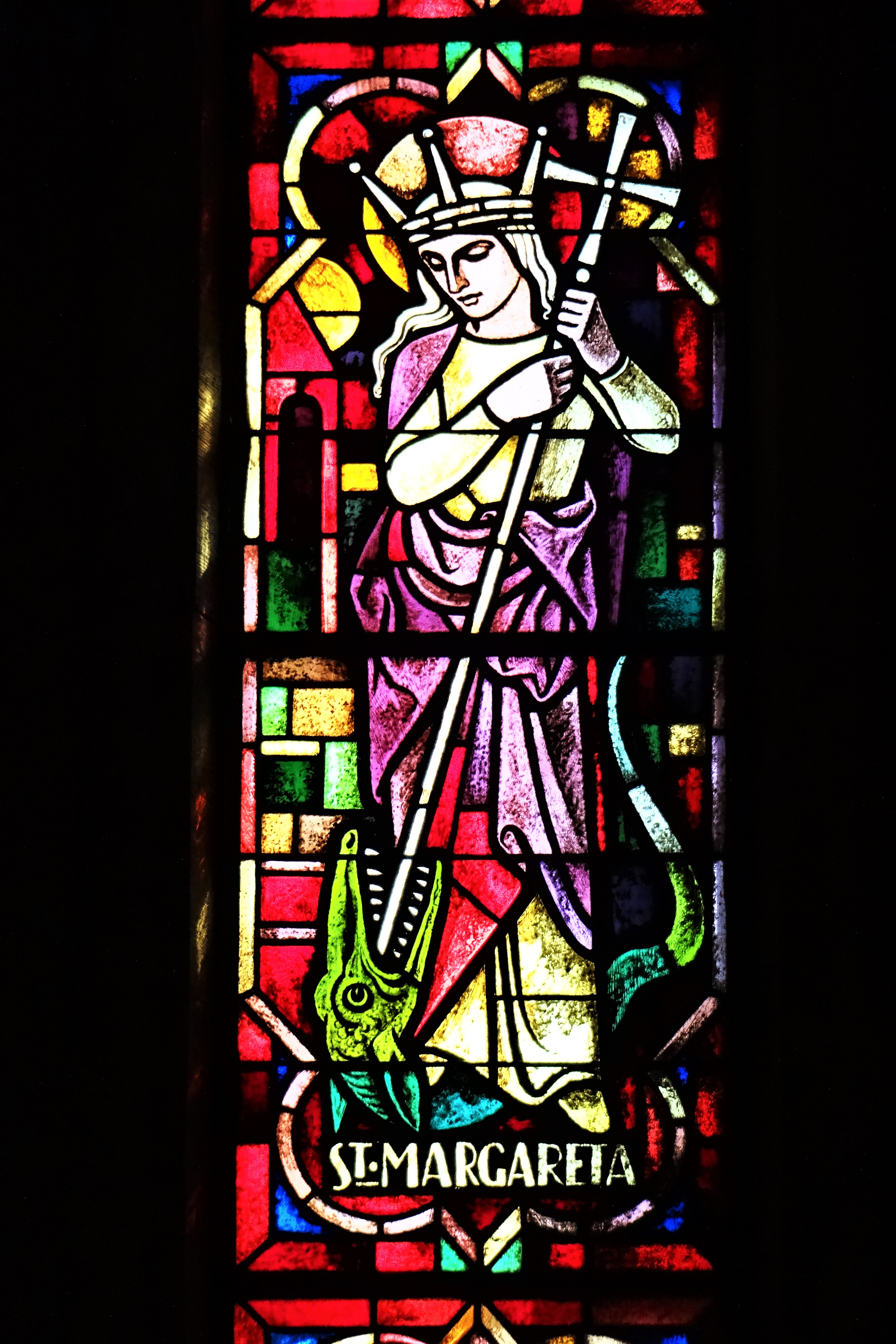
ST.MARGARETA

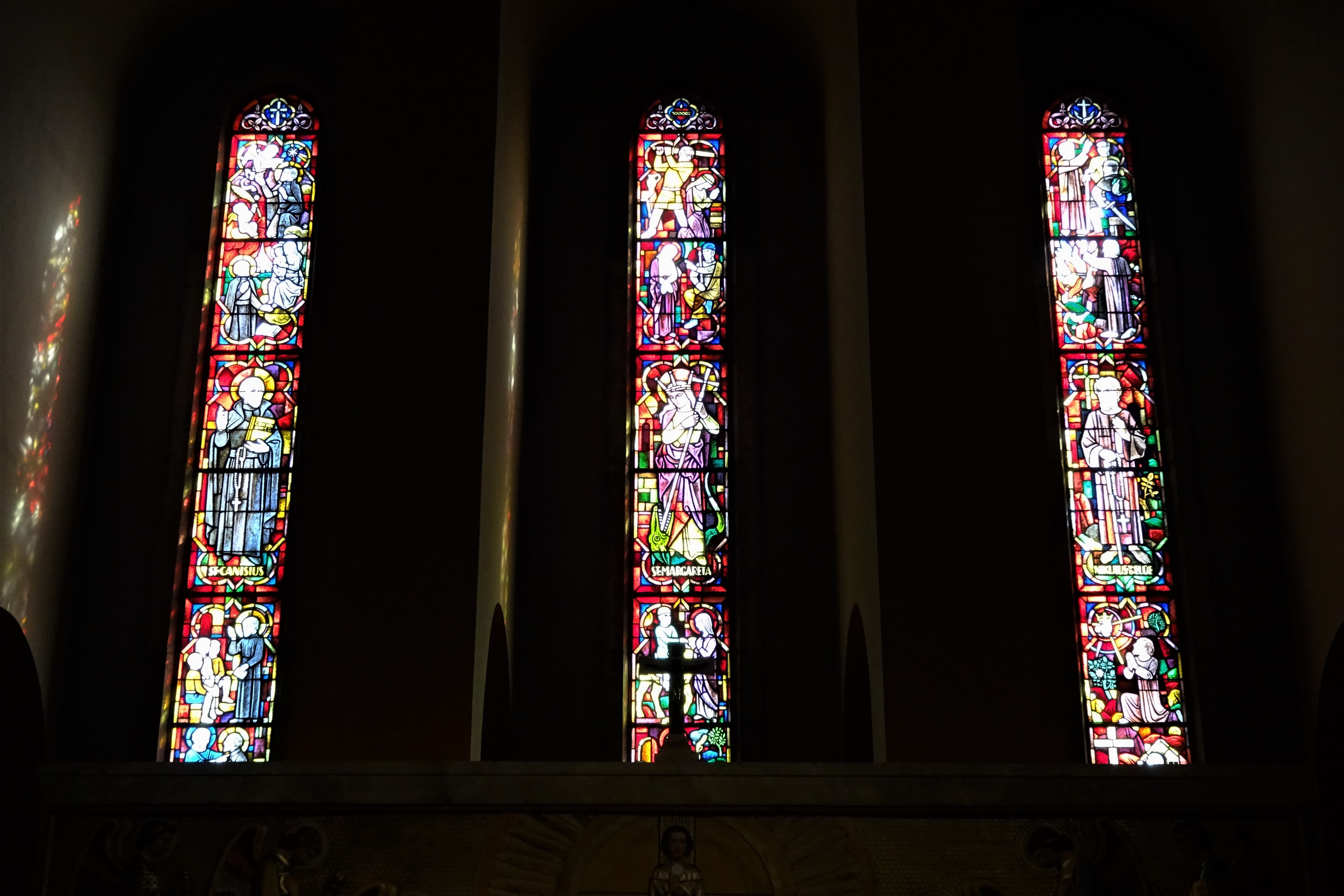
Pfarrkirche St.Margaretha

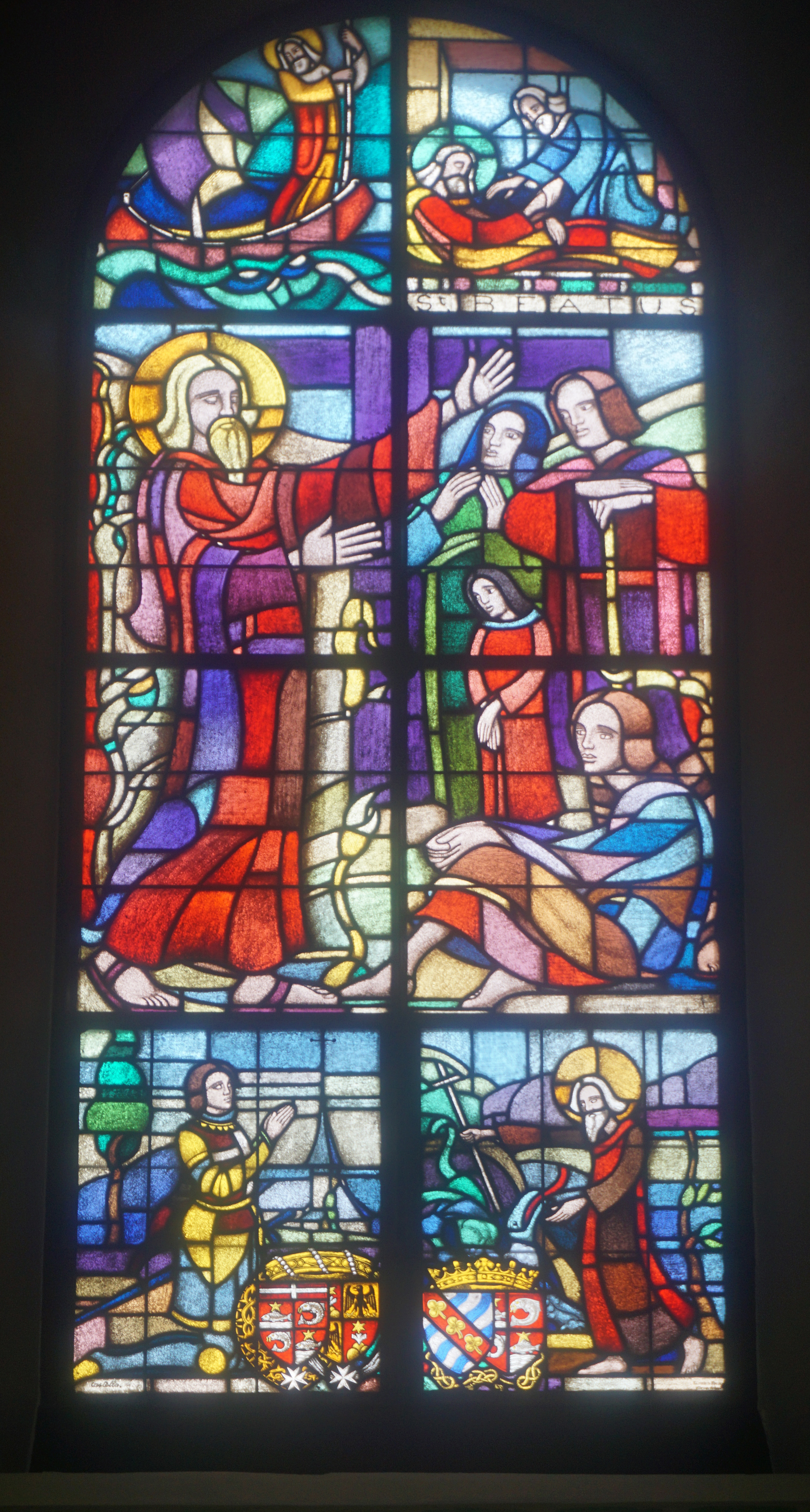
Dreifaltigkeitskirche, Bern

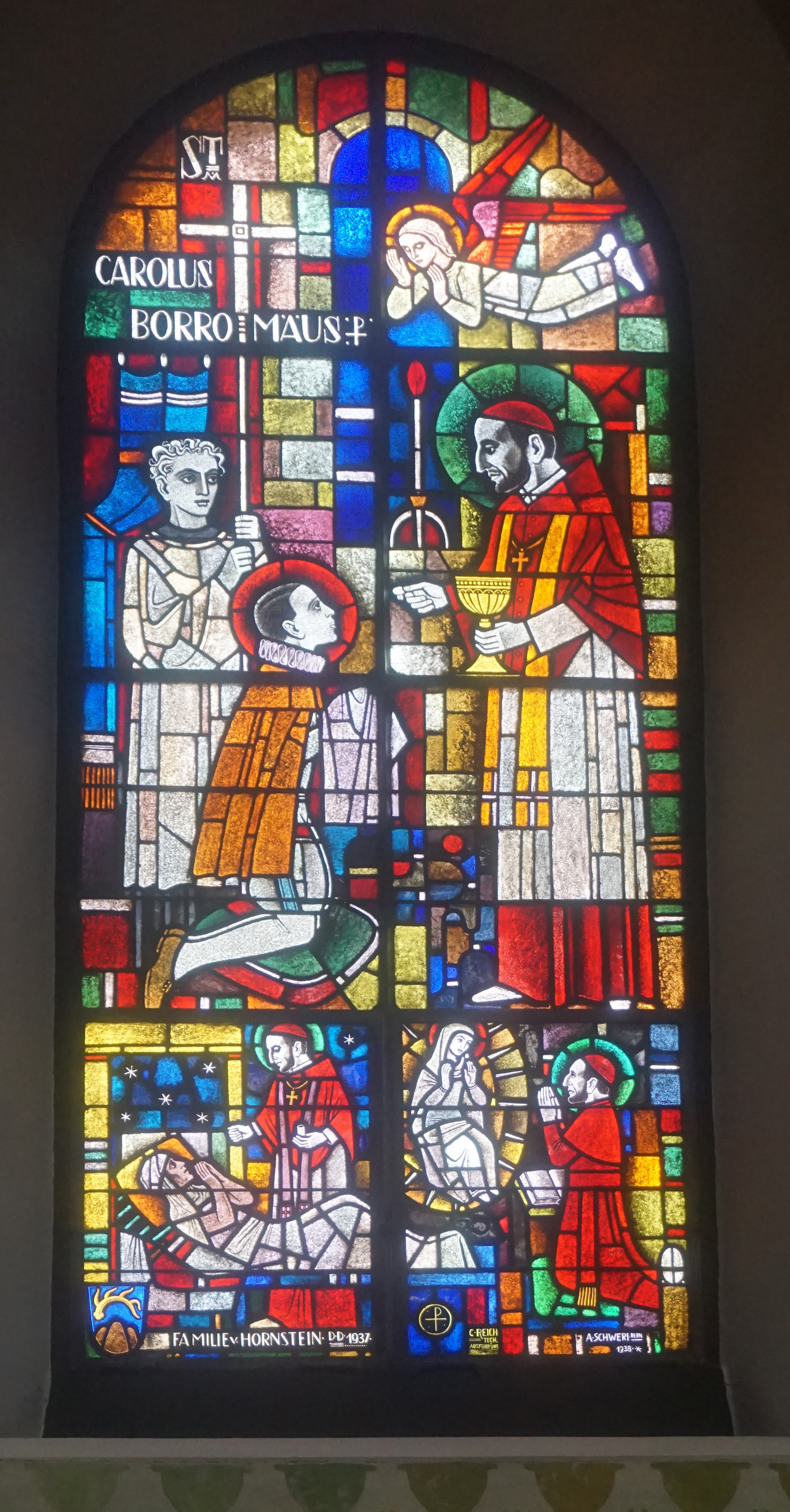
Dreifaltigkeitskirche, Bern

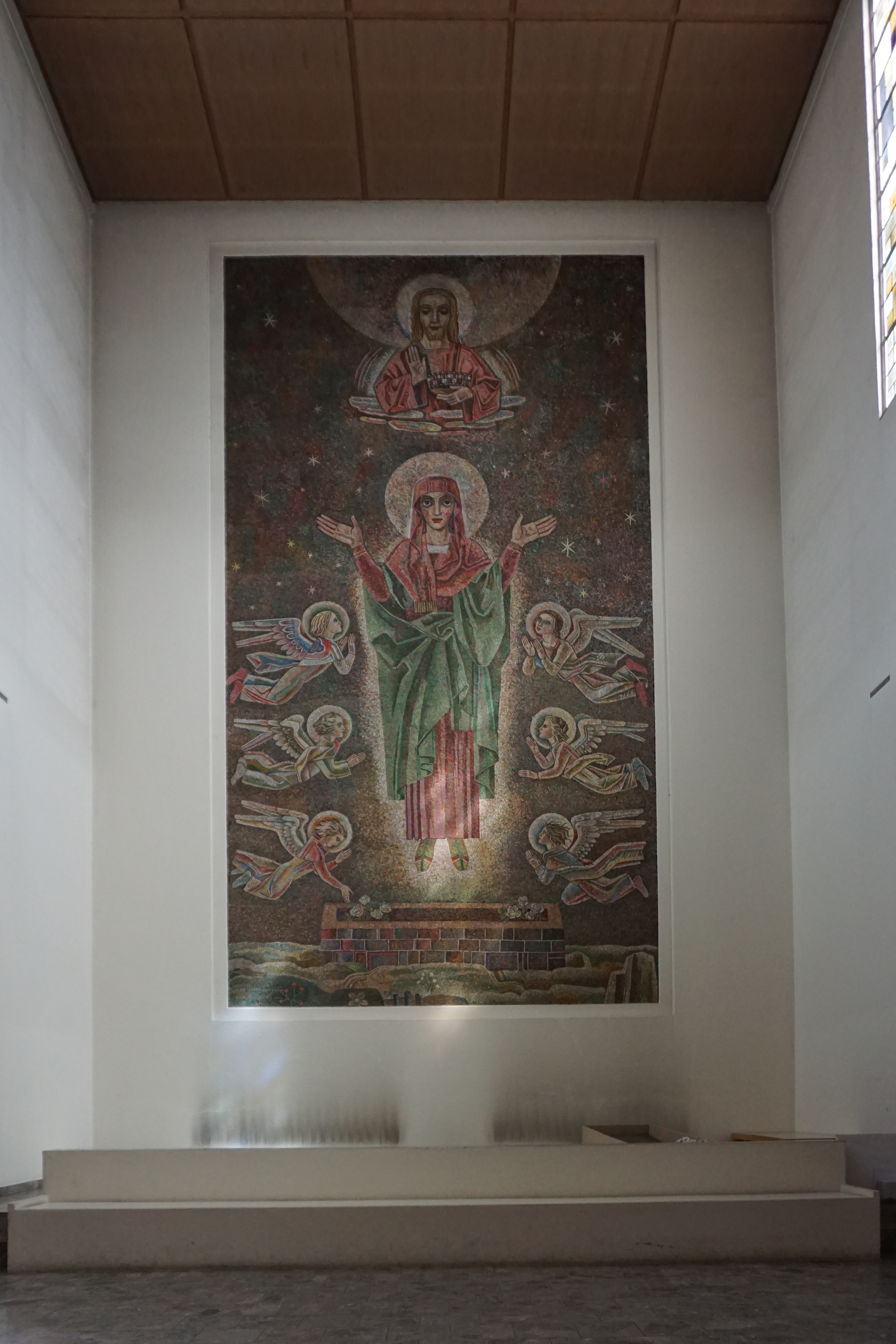
Marienkirche, Bern
