= Bantzer =

Bantzer is a surname. Notable people with the name include:

- Carl Bantzer (1857–1941), German painter, professor and art critic
- Christoph Bantzer (born 1936), German television actor
- Claus Bantzer (born 1942), German church musician, composer and director
