= Nidda =

Nidda or Niddah could refer to:

- Niddah (from Hebrew: נִדָּה nidá; alternative forms: Nidda, Nida, Nidah), a concept in Judaism, name for any woman during menstruation, or a woman who has menstruated and not yet completed the associated requirement of immersion in a mikveh (ritual bath)
- Niddah (Talmud), a tractate in the Mishna and Talmud, on the Halakha of Niddah in the order of Mishnah Tohorot.
- Nidda, Hesse, a town in Germany
- County of Nidda, medieval polity in Germany
- Nidda (river), a river in Germany
- County of Nidda, a state of the Holy Roman Empire from 1104-1450

== See also ==
- Nedda, given name
