= Neda aequatoriana =

Scientific classification
- Kingdom: Animalia
- Phylum: Arthropoda
- Clade: Pancrustacea
- Class: Insecta
- Order: Coleoptera
- Suborder: Polyphaga
- Infraorder: Cucujiformia
- Family: Coccinellidae
- Genus: Neda
- Species: N. aequatoriana

Binomial name
- Neda aequatoriana Mulsant, 1853

Synonyms
- Neda illuda Mulsant, 1853

Species of beetle

Neda aequatoriana is a species of beetle of the family Coccinellidae. It is found in Ecuador.
