= Neda areolata =

Scientific classification
- Kingdom: Animalia
- Phylum: Arthropoda
- Clade: Pancrustacea
- Class: Insecta
- Order: Coleoptera
- Suborder: Polyphaga
- Infraorder: Cucujiformia
- Family: Coccinellidae
- Genus: Neda
- Species: N. areolata

Binomial name
- Neda areolata (Gorham, 1892)

Synonyms
- Neocalvia areolata Gorham, 1892

Species of beetle

Neda areolata is a species of beetle of the family Coccinellidae. It is found in Panama.

== Description ==
Adults reach a length of about 6.6 mm (0.26 in). They are light brown with yellow spots. Six spots on the elytra leave a very thin brown net between them, and a seventh point-like spot in the intersection of the posterior three.
