= Nedda =

Nedda is a diminutive form of Antonietta and form of Antonia in use in Italy. Notable people with this name include the following:

== Given name ==
- Nedda Francy (1908–1982), Argentine actress
- Nedda Harrigan (1899–1989), American actress
- Nedda Casei (1932–2020), American operatic singer

== Fictional character ==
- Nedda, the soprano female lead of the Italian opera, Pagliacci

== See also ==
- Neda (disambiguation)
- Neddy
- Netta (disambiguation)
- Nidda (disambiguation)
