= Australoneda ruitong =

Scientific classification
- Kingdom: Animalia
- Phylum: Arthropoda
- Clade: Pancrustacea
- Class: Insecta
- Order: Coleoptera
- Suborder: Polyphaga
- Infraorder: Cucujiformia
- Family: Coccinellidae
- Genus: Australoneda
- Species: A. ruitong

Binomial name
- Australoneda ruitong Li, Ślipiński & Pang, 2009

Species of beetle

Australoneda ruitong is a species of beetle of the family Coccinellidae. It is found in Papua New Guinea.

== Description ==
Adults reach a length of about 8–8.5 mm (0.31–0.33 in). The head is brown in males, while it is brown with black marking in females. The pronotum is black with a elliptical white or yellow area. The scutellum is black and the elytra are black with a reddish crescent-shaped area and two red spots on the disc.
