= Australoneda fuerschi =

Scientific classification
- Kingdom: Animalia
- Phylum: Arthropoda
- Clade: Pancrustacea
- Class: Insecta
- Order: Coleoptera
- Suborder: Polyphaga
- Infraorder: Cucujiformia
- Family: Coccinellidae
- Genus: Australoneda
- Species: A. fuerschi

Binomial name
- Australoneda fuerschi (Bielawski, 1963)

Synonyms
- Neda fuerschi Bielawski, 1963

Species of beetle

Australoneda fuerschi is a species of beetle of the family Coccinellidae. It is found in Indonesia (Western New Guinea), Papua New Guinea and New Britain.

== Description ==
Adults reach a length of about 7.5–10 mm (0.30–0.39 in). The head is yellow or light brown and the pronotum is brown with lighter margins. The scutellum is dark brown or black and the elytra are brown with a yellowish area and a light band. The legs are yellow.
