= Australoneda taengana =

Scientific classification
- Kingdom: Animalia
- Phylum: Arthropoda
- Clade: Pancrustacea
- Class: Insecta
- Order: Coleoptera
- Suborder: Polyphaga
- Infraorder: Cucujiformia
- Family: Coccinellidae
- Genus: Australoneda
- Species: A. taengana

Binomial name
- Australoneda taengana (Bielawski, 1963)

Synonyms
- Neda taengana Bielawski, 1963

Species of beetle

Australoneda taengana is a species of beetle of the family Coccinellidae. It is found in southern Papua New Guinea.

== Description ==
Adults reach a length of about 7.5–9.6 mm (0.30–0.38 in). The head is yellow in females and also yellow in males, but with a black marking. The middle of the pronotum is black, with two large yellow lateral areas joined by a stripe. The scutellum is black and the elytra are black with a reddish crescent area.
