= Australoneda =

Scientific classification
- Kingdom: Animalia
- Phylum: Arthropoda
- Clade: Pancrustacea
- Class: Insecta
- Order: Coleoptera
- Suborder: Polyphaga
- Infraorder: Cucujiformia
- Family: Coccinellidae
- Subfamily: Coccinellinae
- Tribe: Coccinellini
- Genus: Australoneda; Iablokoff-Khnzorian, 1984

Genus of beetles

Australoneda is a genus of beetles belonging to the family Coccinellidae.

== Species ==
- Australoneda bielawskii
- Australoneda bourgeoisi
- Australoneda fuerschi
- Australoneda horni
- Australoneda karubakana
- Australoneda maai
- Australoneda ruitong
- Australoneda taengana
