= Neddy =

Neddy or Neddie may refer to:

== People ==
- Neddy Atieno (born 1992), Kenyan former footballer
- Neddie Herbert (1907–1949), American gangster
- Neddy Rose (born 1981), Seychellois footballer
- Neddy Smith (1944–2021), Australian career criminal

== Fictional characters ==
- Neddy Merrill, protagonist of the short story "The Swimmer" by John Cheever
- Neddie Seagoon, in the 1950s British radio comedy show The Goon Show
- Neddy, a recurring character in the British comedy show A Bit of Fry & Laurie, played by Hugh Laurie
- Neddy, Princess Bubblegum's brother in the animated series Adventure Time

== See also ==
- Nedda, given name
