= Neda boliviana =

Scientific classification
- Kingdom: Animalia
- Phylum: Arthropoda
- Clade: Pancrustacea
- Class: Insecta
- Order: Coleoptera
- Suborder: Polyphaga
- Infraorder: Cucujiformia
- Family: Coccinellidae
- Genus: Neda
- Species: N. boliviana

Binomial name
- Neda boliviana (Weise, 1898)

Synonyms
- Neda ostrina var. boliviana Weise, 1898

Species of beetle

Neda boliviana is a species of beetle of the family Coccinellidae. It is found in Bolivia and Ecuador.
