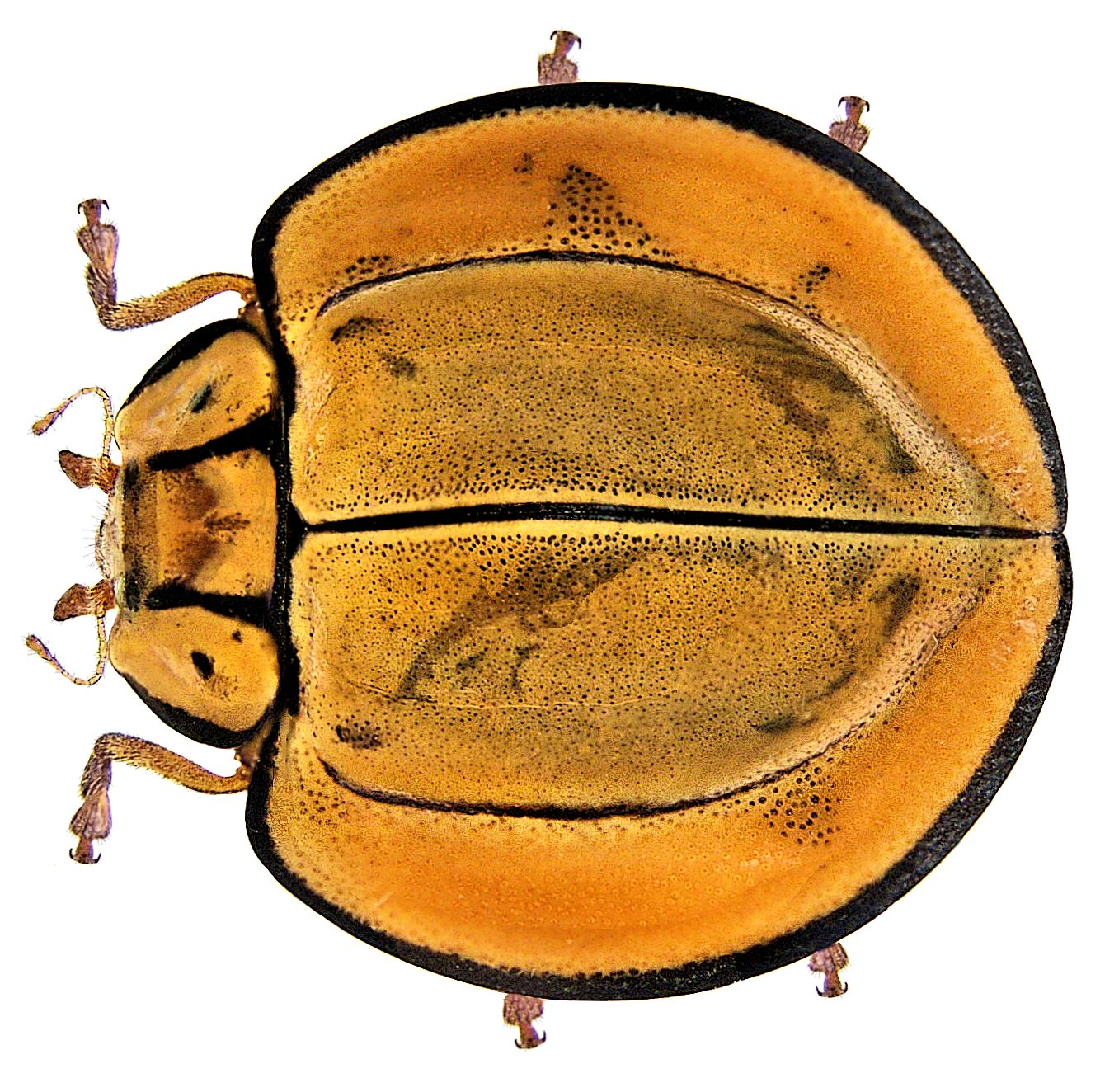

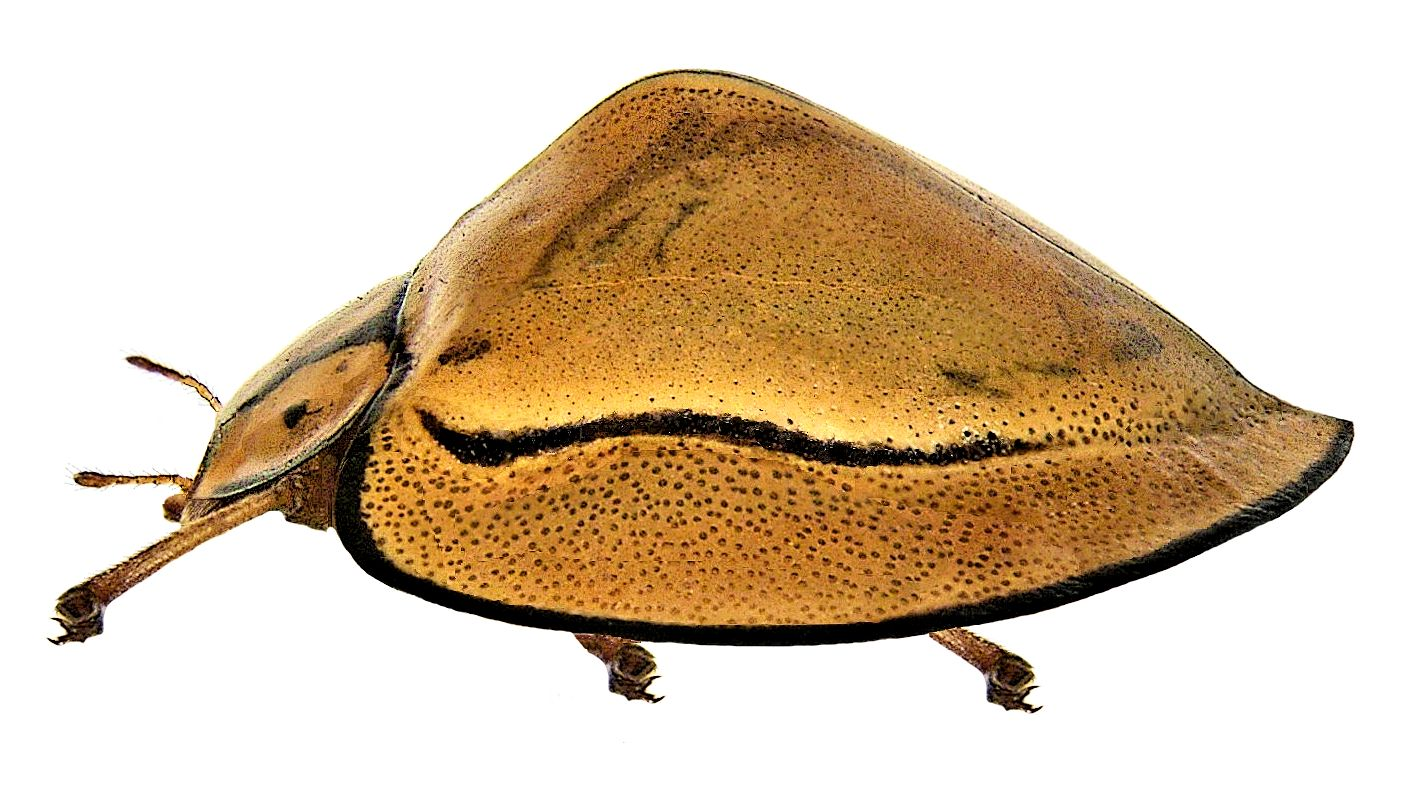

Scientific classification
- Kingdom: Animalia
- Phylum: Arthropoda
- Clade: Pancrustacea
- Class: Insecta
- Order: Coleoptera
- Suborder: Polyphaga
- Infraorder: Cucujiformia
- Family: Coccinellidae
- Genus: Australoneda
- Species: A. bielawskii

Binomial name
- Australoneda bielawskii Li, Ślipiński & Pang, 2009

= Australoneda bielawskii =

Species of beetle

Australoneda bielawskii is a species of beetle of the family Coccinellidae. It is found in Indonesia (provinces of New Guinea).

== Description ==
Adults reach a length of about 9–11.5 mm (0.35–0.45 in). The head is yellowish and the pronotum is yellow, with black lateral and posterior margins, two black bands on the disc, and a small spot on each lateral area. The scutellum is yellow with black borders and the elytra are yellowish, with black margins and suture. Each elytron has a black line separating the disc from the margins.
