= Australoneda horni =

Scientific classification
- Kingdom: Animalia
- Phylum: Arthropoda
- Clade: Pancrustacea
- Class: Insecta
- Order: Coleoptera
- Suborder: Polyphaga
- Infraorder: Cucujiformia
- Family: Coccinellidae
- Genus: Australoneda
- Species: A. horni

Binomial name
- Australoneda horni (Korschefsky, 1934)

Synonyms
- Neda horni Korschefsky, 1934

Species of beetle

Australoneda horni is a species of beetle of the family Coccinellidae. It is found in southern Papua New Guinea.

== Description ==
Adults reach a length of about 7.5–10 mm (0.30–0.39 in). The head is yellow with a black central marking. The pronotum is black with a yellow area and the scutellum is black. The elytra have black margins and the disc has markings forming a cross-like shape, with the anterior quarters yellowish and orange or brown, and posterior quarters yellow.
