= Australoneda karubakana =

Scientific classification
- Kingdom: Animalia
- Phylum: Arthropoda
- Clade: Pancrustacea
- Class: Insecta
- Order: Coleoptera
- Suborder: Polyphaga
- Infraorder: Cucujiformia
- Family: Coccinellidae
- Genus: Australoneda
- Species: A. karubakana

Binomial name
- Australoneda karubakana (Bielawski, 1963)

Synonyms
- Neda karubakana Bielawski, 1963

Species of beetle

Australoneda karubakana is a species of beetle of the family Coccinellidae. It is found in Papua New Guinea and Indonesia (Western New Guinea).

== Description ==
Adults reach a length of about 7.1–10 mm (0.28–0.39 in). The head is yellow or brown and the pronotum is black medially, with two yellow lateral areas and with a black central dot and a stripe along the anterior margin. The scutellum is black and the elytra are usually black with a reddish to yellowish crescent-shaped area, a triangular basal spot, and an apical spot.
