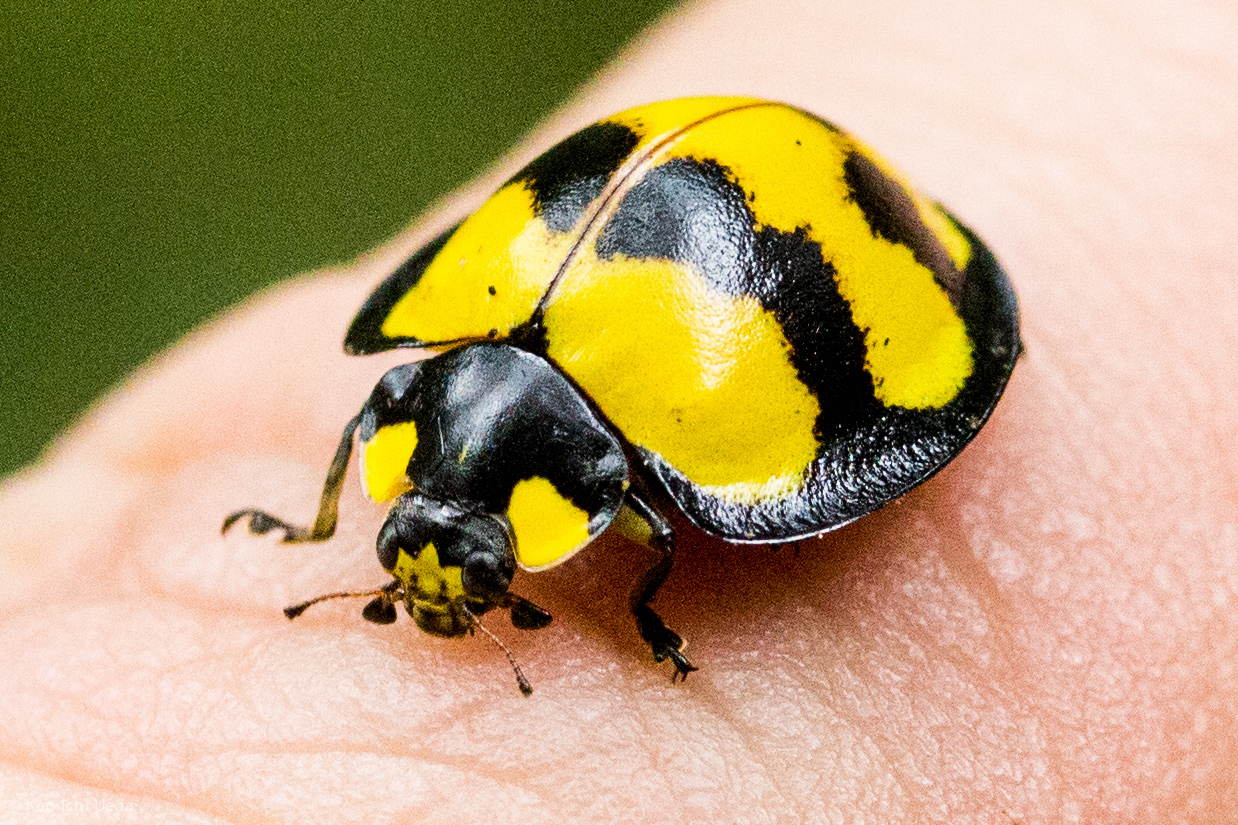
- Neda norrisii

Scientific classification
- Kingdom: Animalia
- Phylum: Arthropoda
- Clade: Pancrustacea
- Class: Insecta
- Order: Coleoptera
- Suborder: Polyphaga
- Infraorder: Cucujiformia
- Family: Coccinellidae
- Tribe: Coccinellini
- Genus: Neda; Mulsant, 1850

= Neda (beetle) =

Genus of beetles

Neda is a genus of lady beetles in the family Coccinellidae.

== Species ==
- Neda aequatoriana
- Neda amandi
- Neda areolata
- Neda boliviana
- Neda brachiata
- Neda callispilota
- Neda emiliae
- Neda jourdani
- Neda nigrobifasciata Mader, 1955
- Neda norrisii
- Neda ochracea
- Neda patula
- Neda tredecimsignata

== Selected former species ==
- Neda maai
