= County of Nidda =

County of the Holy Roman Empire

County of Nidda Grafschaft Nidda
- 1065–1333
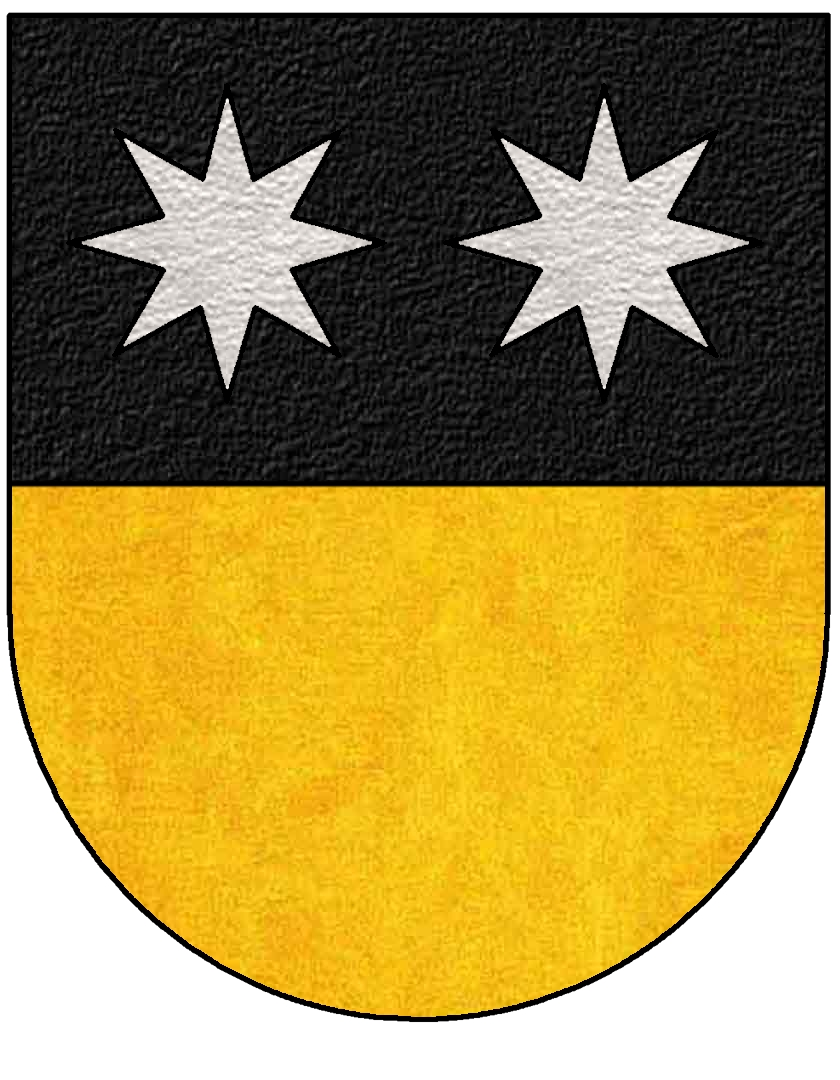
- Coat of arms

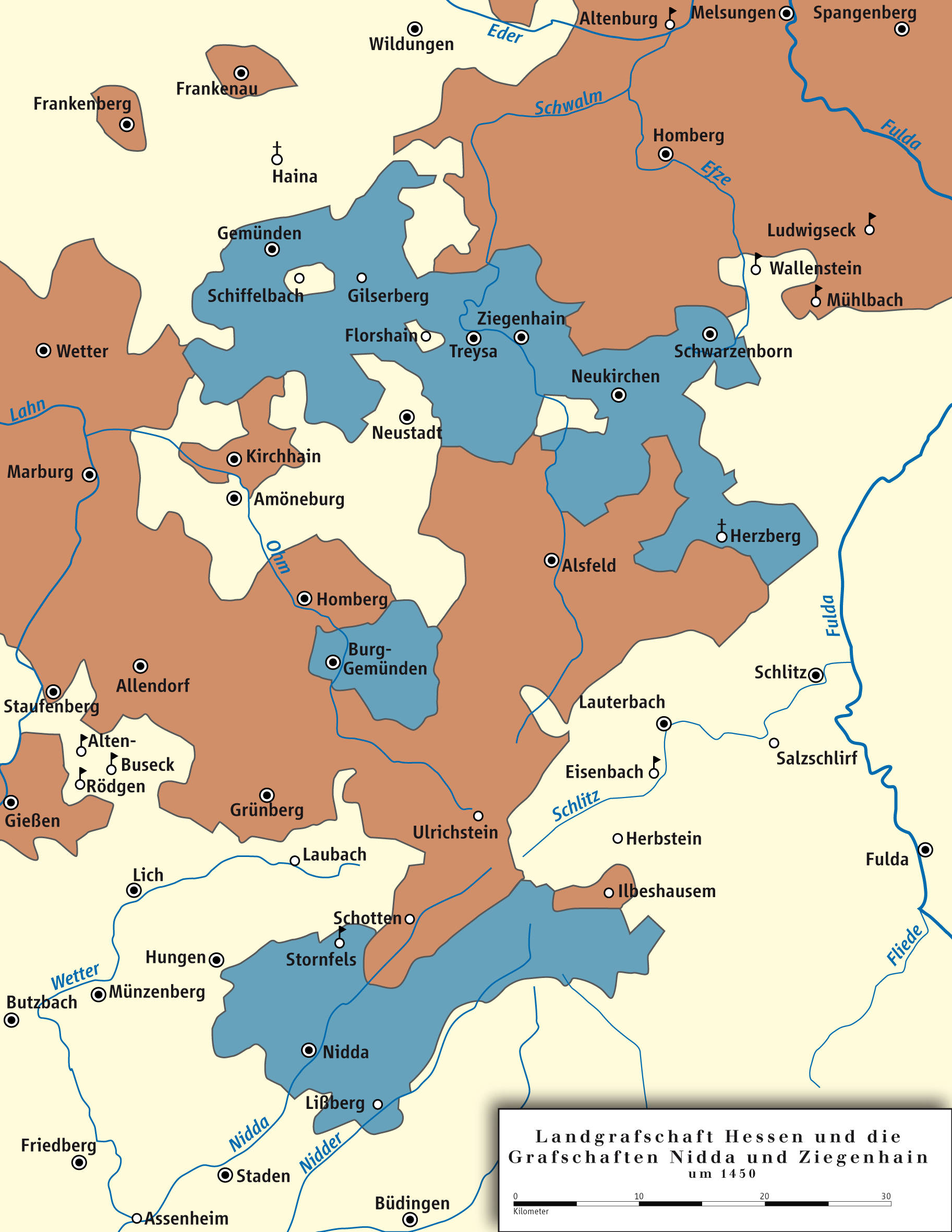
- Counties of Ziegenhain and Nidda (blue) and the County of Hesse (brown) ca. 1450
- Status: State of the Holy Roman Empire; (1065-1206, 1258-1333)
- Capital: Nidda; 50°24′46″N 9°0′33″E
- Government: County
- Count
- History
  - Established: 1065
  - Merged with County of Ziegenhain: 1206
  - Imperial immediacy for City of Nidda: 1234
  - Separated from Ziegenhain: 1258
  - Merged with County of Ziegenhain: 1333
Preceded by	Succeeded by
Princely Abbey of Fulda	County of Ziegenhain
- Today part of: Germany

The County of Nidda (German: Grafschaft Nidda was a small county of the Holy Roman Empire centred on the city of Nidda in modern Wetteraukreis, Hesse. It was located on the northern edge of the Wetterau river valley and consisted of a relatively cohesive block of land held in fief from the Abbey of Fulda.

The County was created by a decree of the Abbey of Fulda, which consolidated the Abbey's possessions in the northern Wetterau. The name "County of Nidda" had become attached to the area by the second half of the eleventh century, when the position of Vogt over the area was given as a fief to Volkold I of Malsburg. The marriage of his son, Volkold II, into the Nürings of Adelsgeschlecht around 1100 expanded the family's possessions. From these territories, the County of Nidda was created. The first reference to a member of the family as "Count of Nidda" dates to 1104, during the reign of Volkold II.

In 1155, after supporting Count palatine Hermann von Stahleck against the Archbishop Arnold of Selenhofen, the family lost Malsburg and other possessions in northern Hesse, meaning that the County was henceforth concentrated in the northern Wetterau region. An endowment of 1187 gives information on the extent of the County. At that point, it contained at least the area between the settlements of Ranstadt, Einartshausen, Wenings, and Gelnhaar. The patchy record makes it unclear what other territories belonged to the County. This document was produced in the reign of Berthold II. He died childless in 1205/6, so the county was inherited by his nephew, Louis I, son of Rudolf II, and his wife Mechthild, sister of Berthold II. Smaller sections of the county were probably given away as dowries for two of his sisters: Adelheid of Ziegenhain, who married Ulrich I of Hagen-Münzenberg, and Mechthild, who married Gerlach II, Count of Isenburg.

From 1205/06, the County of Nidda was in the possession of the Counts of Ziegenhain, for whom it had only secondary significance compared to the substantially larger County of Ziegenhain. Nidda was formally separated from Ziegenhain and passed to a junior line during the period 1259-1330, but it returned to the Ziegenhain main line after John I, Count of Ziegenhain married Lukardis (Luitgart), daughter of the last Count of Nidda, Engelbert I. After John II died childless in 1450, the County of Nidda, along with the County of Ziegenhain, passed to the Landgraviate of Hesse and ceased to exist as a separate lordship. By this point, it consisted of the Amt Nidda with the assizes of Widdersheim, Rodheim , Ulfa and Wallernhausen, the Lordship of Lissberg, the Fuldish Mark with the half vogteien of Echzell, Berstadt, Dauernheim und Bingenheim (except for the castle), and the assizes of Burkhards and Crainfeld

== Origin ==
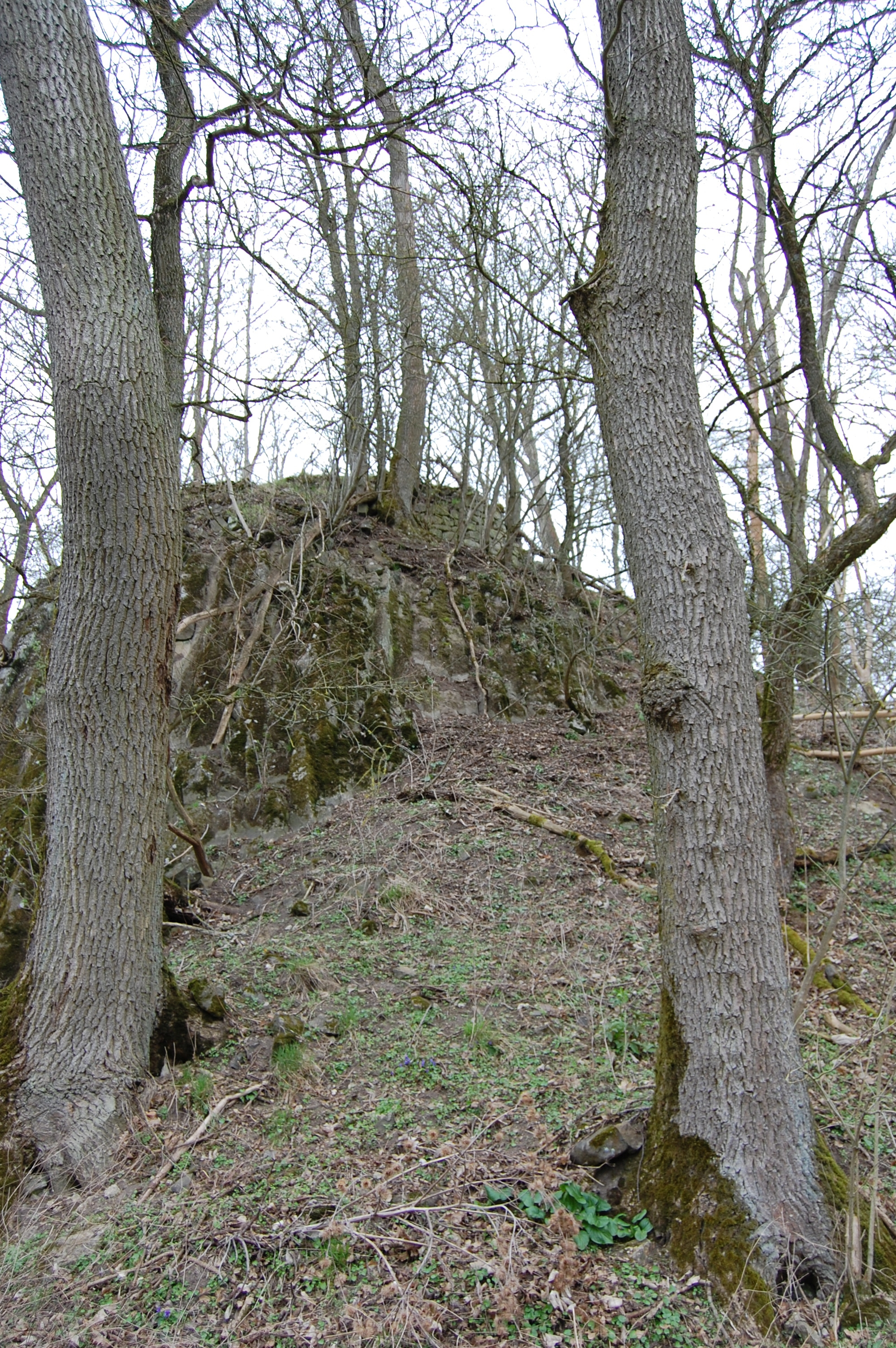
Ruins of Malsburg castle.

The Abbey of Fulda acquired substantial estates in the Wetterau region after the fall of the Conradines on the basis of various imperial rights which had been transferred to them over time. To unify these territories administratively, the Abbey established the assize of Bingenheim in 1064 around the Schloss Bingenheim. Soon after, probably under Abbot Widerad of Eppenstein (1060-1075), the region of the assize of Birgenheim was referred to as the "County of Nidda". Since the Abbey could not operate the blood court itself and required secular protection of its possessions, it established vogts for the Fuldish Mark and its possessions along the Nidda river. These vogts received the area (excepting Bingenheim castle) as a Fuldian fief. Initially, the Vogtei of the small County of Nidda was probably a fief of Fulda in the hands of the Lords of Nürings castle in the Taunus. It was transferred in whole or in part to the lords of Malsburg castle, probably by Abbot Widerad. They had also acquired the allod of the area and are named as "Counts of Nidda" from 1104.

== Counts of Nidda from House Malsburg (ca. 1065-1205) ==
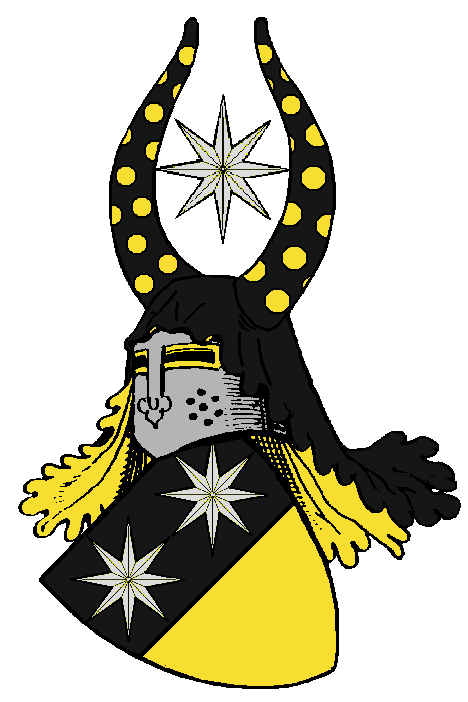
Coat of arms of the Malsburg Counts of Nidda.

=== Volkold I ===
The Vogtei of Bingenheim or the Fuldish Mark was probably entrusted to the free knight Volkold I (ca. 1040-1097) of Malsburg in whole or in part by Abbot Widerad in or shortly after 1065. Volkold, who is first attested in 1062, served as the Fuldan Vogt in Bingenheim from then on and was the founder of the relatively short-lived House of the first Counts of Nidda. Volkold's family had acquired a small lordship in the area of Zierenberg in northern Hesse in the 10th century and had established their castle at Malsburg. It is unclear whether it was Volkold I or his son Volkold II who built the water castle at Nidda. It may have been begun by the father and completed by the son. The name "County of Nidda" is attested for the fief at Bingheim in this period.

=== Volkold II ===
Volkold's son, Volkold II (ca. 1070 - ca. 1130), married Luitgart of Nürings, a daughter of Berthold of Nürings (1050-1112). The marriage brought Volkold allod in the area around Nidda, which was the basis of the County of Nidda, and probably also strengthened his claim to succeed his father as Vogt of Bingenheim, which he did in 1087. He transferred his main residence from the Fuldan castle in Bingenheim to the castle built at Nidda by him and/or his father, which he owned outright. Volkold is recorded as "Count of Nidda" from 1104 at the latest.

Subsequently, as a result of a feud, Volkold was imprisoned in Mainz and he and has brother Udalrich had to surrender their castles, Malsburg and Schartenberg to Adalbert I, Archbishop of Mainz, from whom they then received them back as fiefs. Volkold II remained at Nidda and left administration of the fiefs to his brother. After Udalrich died childless, the whole county returned to him.

=== Berthold I ===
Volkold's son, Berthold I (ca. 1110-1162) succeeded his father as Count of Nidda. He expanded his possessions around Nidda by exchanging properties that he had inherited in North Hesse and Westphalia with local properties of Helmarshausen Abbey and Abdinghofkloster. In 1154, he lost his remaining Westphalian territories at Atteln and Boke to Abdinghof Abbey in a legal case decided by Duke Henry the Lion.

In 1155, he also lost the castles of Malsburg and Schartenberg to Archbishop Arnold of Mainz, since he had taken the side of Count Palatine Hermann III of Stahleck in a feud. Several other counts who had supported the Count Palatine were convicted of breach of the peace by Emperor Frederick I Barbarossa, placed under the Imperial ban, and subjected to the humiliating punishment of the Hundetragen, but Berthold ignored the summons to Gelnhausen and the judgement. He instead established himself as a robber baron and bandit. For this, he used the Alteburg at Kohden as a base. He was finally forced to accept punishment by an Imperial command. According to folklore, after an attempt by his wife to save him, he was forced to accept punishment.

=== Berthold II ===
The next Count of Nidda, Berthold II (dead by 1205), probably Berthold I's son, was a close follower of Frederick Barbarossa. He gifted extensive possessions in Nidda, including the parish of Nitehe (Nidda) and its daughter churches in Eichelsdorf and Reichelshausen (now abandoned, east of Ober-Schmitten), as well as the revenues of twenty-six other places in the area between Einartshausen and Eschenrod in the north and Wallernhausen, Wenings und Gelnhaar in the south to the Order of St. John in 1187, for the protection of his parents' souls. The Order used this gift to establish their first commandery in Hesse (their eighth in Germany).

Berthold is last attested in 1191, as witness to the establishment of Konradsdorf Abbey. At his death the House of Malsburg was extinct in the male line.

== First unification with Ziegenhain (ca. 1205-1250) ==
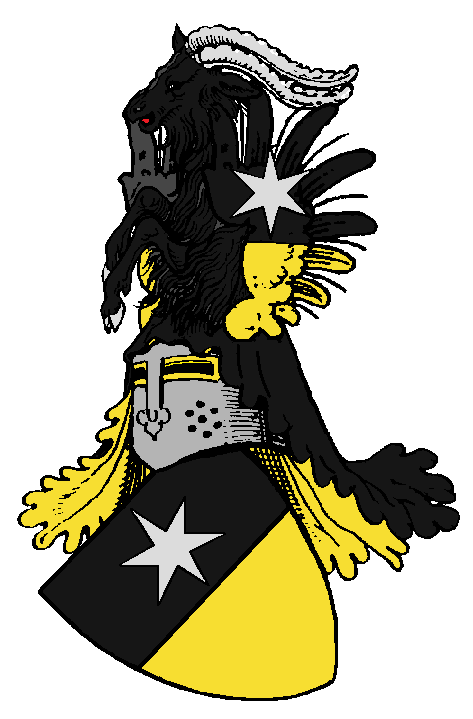
Coat of arms of the Counts of Ziegenhain

=== Louis I ===
After Berthold II's death, the County of Nidda, which remained a fief of Fulda Abbey, passed via his sister Mechthild, who had married Count Rudolf II of Ziegenhain in 1170, to their son Louis I (born 1167 in Nidda, died 1227). Louis had become the Count of Ziegenhain after the death of his older brother Gottfried II in 1205 and he therefore united the two counties.

At this time, the County of Nidda extended up the Ohm and Felda rivers in Vogelsberg and included Streubesitz at Rüdesheim in the Rheingau, as well as the Vogtei over the possessions of Fulda Abbey and some of the possessions of the Archbishopric of Mainz in the Wetterau and on the Main river. Louis also made donations in Nidda to the Knights of St John, such as Brungesrode in 1226 (near the modern Am Ruppelshof Straße). As a result of the marriages of his sisters Adelheid and Mechthild, many properties and rights of the County of Nidda passed to their husbands, Ulrich I of Münzenberg and Gerlach II of Büdingen, such as the Vogtei of Schotten. Along with his relatives in Ziegenhain and Reichenbach, Louis donated the former Reichenbach Abbey Church to the Teutonic Order - their first significant branch within the Holy Roman Empire. Louis was a reliable supporter of the Hohenstaufen dynasty and after the election of Philip of Swabia as Emperor in 1198 he is repeatedly attested in his entourage (at Nürnberg in 1205, Boppard in 1206, Gelnhausen and Jülich in 1207).

=== Berthold I and Gottfried IV ===
After Louis died in 1227, his sons Gottfried IV (died 1250) and Berthold I (born 1207, died 1257/58) ruled over both counties together, with Berthold residing in the Ziegenhain ancestral lands and Gottfried in Nidda. Both of them were supporters of the Hohenstaufen, like their father. In the decisive phase of the Hohenstaufens' conflict with the Papacy, however, they switched their support to the Pope, along with their brother Burkhart, who was Provost of Saint Peter's Church in Fritzlar from 1240 and became Archbishop of Salzburg in 1247, but died the same year, in the camp of the Papal candidate for emperor, Henry Raspe. From 1234, the brothers held the city of Nidda as an Imperial Estate, making the Counts of Nidda Imperial princes (the county of Nidda remained a fief of the Abbey of Fulda).

== Separation of Nidda and Ziegenhain (1250-1333) ==
=== Louis II ===
When Gottfried IV died in 1250, he was succeeded in the County of Nidda by his son Louis II (died between 1290 and 1294). He and his cousin, Gottfried V, Count of Ziegenhain, came into conflict soon after the latter came to power in Ziegenhain in 1258 and in the same year there was a formal partition of the two counties and an exchange of territories, mediated by Archbishop Gerhard I of Mainz, Bishop Simon I of Paderborn, and Abbot Henry IV of Fulda (who was also Abbot of Hersfeld, in which role he was the overlord of Ziegenhain and parts of Nidda). Louis II received the County of Nidda and the Amt of Neustadt, gave up the Vogtei of Burg-Gemünden in exchange for the fiefs of Rodheim and Widdersheim, and had to renounce his claims to Staufenberg, Rauschenberg, Treysa, the castle in Burg-Gemünden, Schlitz and Lissberg. Gottfried had the option to buy the Vogtei of Fulda from Louis for 175 silver marks. Gottfried could build in Nidda and Louis in Ziegenhain, but neither could damage the territory of the other. In 1259 Louis purchased the shares of Nidda castle owned by the Rhine Counts Werner II and Siegfried I of Stein. In 1263, he surrendered his right to Hornberg Castle in Neckarzimmern to the Bishop of Speyer. He established the family tradition of making donations at the Abbey of Haina. He also sold substantial territories in the city of Nidda and the wider county to the Knights of St John between 1264 and 1286, probably because he was short of money, and in 1279, he mortgaged the Fuldan Vogtei to Abbot Bertho IV of Fulda for 400 marks.

Louis II and Gottfried V both got caught up in the War of the Thuringian Succession. Louis II sought to maintain his independence against the claims of Sophie of Thuringia and her son Henry I, Landgrave of Hesse to overlordship. Therefore, he joined the side of the Archbishop of Mainz. At Neustadt, Louis built a castle around 1270, to counter the Hessian Marburg, but it was captured by troops of Henry of Hesse in 1273 - the same year in which Gottfried V's castles in Staufenberg and Burg-Gemünden were captured and destroyed. In 1288, Louis leant 350 marks to Archbishop Henry II of Mainz

=== Engelbert I ===
After Louis II's death sometime between 1290 and 1294, his son Engelbert I inherited his territory, taking the title "Count of Ziegenhain, Lord for Nidda" (Graf von Ziegenhain, Herr zu Nidda). To resolve his difficulties at Neustadt, Engelbert sold the castle and city of Neustadt, along with its dependent villages to Archbishop Gerhard II of Mainz on 12 March 1294 for 2,200 Cologne marks. For Nidda, the sale got rid of a distant estate, but for Ziegenhain it was seriously damaging, since it meant that the core region of Ziegenhain on the Schwalm river was separated from the area on the Wohra river with the Amt of Rauschenberg. In 1300, a conflict broke out between Engelbert and the Order of St. John, concerning several locations, which led to a military conflict in 1314/15 and was only resolved in 1315.

Engelbert married Heilwig, daughter of Louis I of Isenburg-Büdingen in 1286. They had a daughter, Lukardis (Luitgard), but no sons, so there was no male heir when Engelbert died on 6 September 1329. However, King Albert I had given him an assurance in 1300 that, in the absence of any sons, his fiefs would be inherited by his daughter.

=== Lukardis ===
In 1311, Lukardis married her second-cousin, John I of Ziegenhain, a great-grandson of Berthold I, who had been Count of Ziegenhain since 1304. As a dowry, Engelbert and Heilwig gave her their estates at Ulfa, Rodheim, Widdersheim, Dauernheim, Bingenheim, Echzell, Berstadt, Burghards and Crainfeld. On 4 February 1311, the day of the wedding, Lukardis and John asserted their rights and freedoms at Nidda, and they subsequently did so at Treysa and Ziegenhain as well. These assertions were probably carried out in order to ensure the smooth transition of the County to them and their heirs. On 1 April 1323, Emperor Louis IV granted John the city and castle of Nidda as Imperial fiefs (the rest of the county remained a fief of Fulda Abbey). After Engelbert died in 1329, Lukardis nominally reigned as Countess of Nidda until her death in 1333.

=== Second unification with Ziegenhain (1333-1450) ===
After Lukardis' death, Nidda passed to John and both counties were once again united under a single ruler. John had inherited the important role of Hochvogt of Fulda Abbey, but from 1279 this had not included the Vogtei over the Abbey itself. In April 1331, he managed to sign a treaty with the City of Fulda, directed against Henry of Hohenberg, the Prince-Abbot and overlord of Fulda, who had offended the city by repeatedly raising taxes. In accordance with this treaty, the Abbey, its towns, and its church were raided and pillaged. The uprising was defeated, however, and John himself only escaped capture with difficulty. John and the city of Fulda were placed under the Imperial ban. Through the mediation of Archbishop Baldwin of Trier, a peace agreement was achieved in September 1331, but it only lasted until 1339, when John had paid off the fines that had been imposed on him.

At the beginning of 1344, John attempted to exchange Nidda for the city of Neustadt, which had belonged to the County until Engelbert sold it to Mainz in 1294, in order to round out his territory in Ziegenhain and reconnect his estates on the Schwalm with those on the Wohra. This came to nothing, since in the same year, a new feud broke out between Landgrave Henry II of Hesse and Archbishop Henry III of Mainz, in which John and his son Gottfried VII allied with the Landgrave, who then captured Neustadt castle. John found himself in such financial difficulty that he sold a quarter of the Castle and City of Nidda, along with their possessions, villages, people, and fiefs to the Archbishop of Mainz on 6 February 1344, with the consent of his son Gottfried (who had already received the Castle and City of Nidda, as well as Burggemünden and Staufenberg castle, from his father).

On 5 May 1344, despite being deeply in debt, the Abbey of Fulda bought back all the remaining rights held by John over Fulda's Vogtei for 7,100 pounds in Heller. The full sum was paid in 1346. John retained only the hereditary role of Marshal of Fulda, which gave him the right to discipline the knights of Fulda, a seat in the local Landtag, and the right to call the feudatory nobles and ministeriales to arms.

The rest of Nidda remained part of Ziegenhain until 1450, when both counties passed to the Landgraviate of Hesse. When the sons of Landgrave Philip I partitioned the Landgraviate in 1567, Nidda and its castle passed to Hesse-Marburg, and then to Hesse-Darmstadt in 1604.

== List of counts of Nidda ==
=== House Malsburg (ca. 1064–1205/06) ===
- Volkold I (ca. 1064-1097)
- Volkold II, son of Volkold I (1097-1130)
- Berthold I, son of Volkold II (1130-1162)
- Berthold II, son of Berthold I (1162-1205/06)

=== House Ziegenhain (1206–1250) ===
- Louis I (1205-1227), son of Rudolf II of Ziegenhain, son-in-law of Berthold II, also Count of Ziegenhain from 1200.
- Gottfried IV (1227-1250) and Berthold III (1227-1257/58), sons of Louis I., together (Gottfried in Nidda, Berthold in Ziegenhain)

=== House Ziegenhain-Nidda (1250-1333) ===
- Louis II (1250-1289/1294), son of Gottfried IV.
- Engelbert I (1289/1294-1329), son of Louis II.
- Lukardis (1329-1333), daughter of Engelbert I

=== House Ziegenhain reunited (1333-1450) ===
- John I (1333-1353), husband of Lukardis, also Count of Ziegenhain from 1304.
- Gottfried VII (1353-1372), son of John I, also Count of Ziegenhain.
- Gottfried VIII (1372-1394), son of Gottfried VII, also Count of Ziegenhain.
- Engelbert III (1394-1401), son of Gottfried VIII, also Count of Ziegenhain.
- John II (1401-1450) and Gottfried IX (1401-1425), sons of Gottfried VIII, together, also Counts of Ziegenhain.

== Bibliography ==
- Ottfried Dascher (ed.), Nidda: die Geschichte einer Stadt und ihres Umlandes. 2nd Edition. Niddaer Heimatmuseum e.V., Nidda 2003, ISBN 3-9803915-8-2.
- Karl E. Demandt, Geschichte des Landes Hessen. 2nd Edition. Kassel 1972, ISBN 3-7618-0404-0. (Grafschaft Nidda: p. 159)
- Angela Metzner, Reichslandpolitik, Adel und Burgen – Untersuchungen zur Wetterau in der Stauferzeit. Büdingen 2008/2009, ISBN 978-3-00-026770-3, pp. 136–141 (Büdinger Geschichtsblätter 21).
- Martin Röhling, Die Geschichte der Grafen von Nidda und der Grafen von Ziegenhain. Hrsg.: Niddaer Heimatmuseum e.V., Nidda 2005, ISBN 3-9803915-9-0. (= Niddaer Geschichtsblätter 9.)
- Wilhelm Wagner, 1025 Jahre Nidda – die Geschichte einer alten, liebenswerten Stadt. Nidda 1976.
- Friedrich-Wilhelm Witzel, Die Reichsabtei Fulda und ihre Hochvögte, die Grafen von Ziegenhain im 12. und 13. Jahrhundert. 1963. (= Veröff. des Fuldaer Geschichtsvereins 41)
- Gerhard Köbler, Historisches Lexikon der deutschen Länder. Die deutschen Territorien vom Mittelalter bis zur Gegenwart. 7., Revised edition. C.H. Beck, München 2007, ISBN 978-3-406-54986-1.
