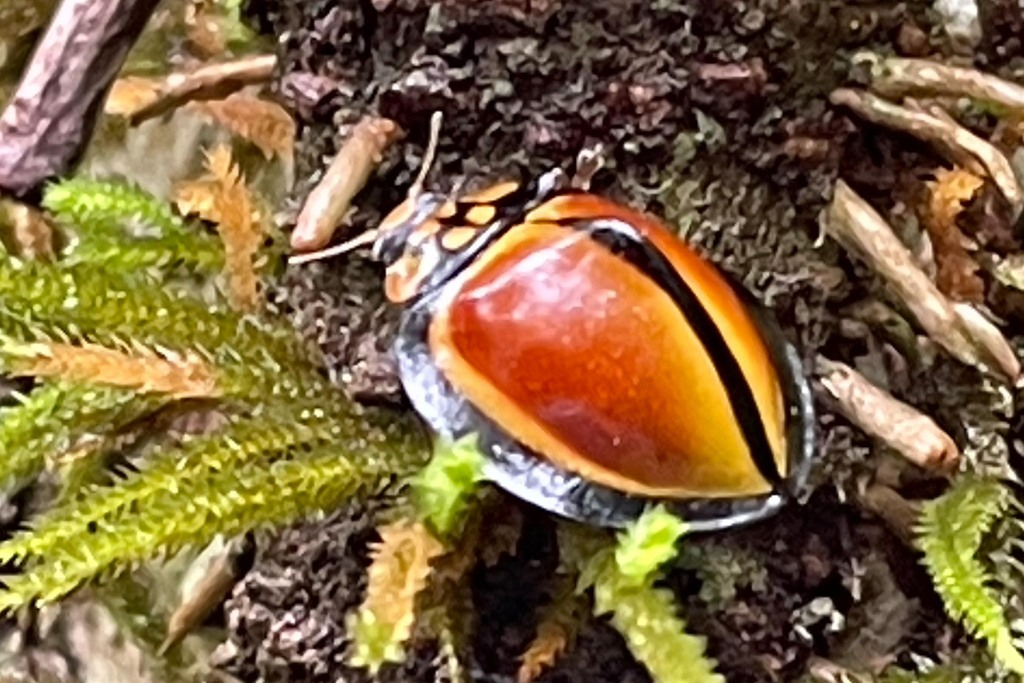

Scientific classification
- Kingdom: Animalia
- Phylum: Arthropoda
- Clade: Pancrustacea
- Class: Insecta
- Order: Coleoptera
- Suborder: Polyphaga
- Infraorder: Cucujiformia
- Family: Coccinellidae
- Genus: Australoneda
- Species: A. bourgeoisi

Binomial name
- Australoneda bourgeoisi (Gadeau de Kerville, 1884)

Synonyms
- Neda bourgeoisi Gadeau de Kerville, 1884

= Australoneda bourgeoisi =

Species of beetle

Australoneda bourgeoisi is a species of beetle of the family Coccinellidae. It is found in Australia (southern Queensland, northern New South Wales).

== Description ==
Adults reach a length of about 8.5–11 mm (0.33–0.43 in). The head is yellow in males and darker in females. The pronotum is yellow, with a black central pattern and lateral and posterior borders. The scutellum is black and the margins and a sutural area on the elytra are black, while the disc is orange, with a yellow band.
