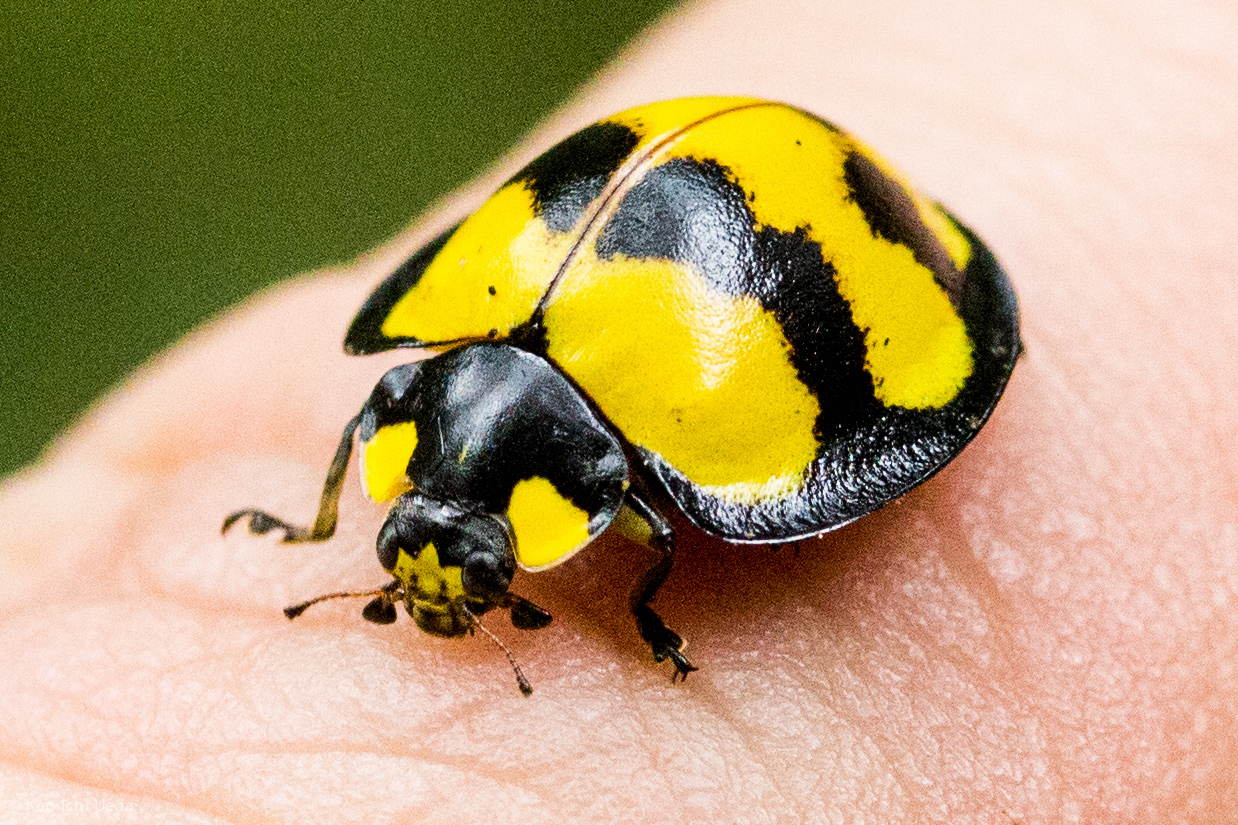

Scientific classification
- Kingdom: Animalia
- Phylum: Arthropoda
- Clade: Pancrustacea
- Class: Insecta
- Order: Coleoptera
- Suborder: Polyphaga
- Infraorder: Cucujiformia
- Family: Coccinellidae
- Genus: Neda
- Species: N. norrisii

Binomial name
- Neda norrisii (Guérin-Méneville, 1844)

Synonyms
- Coccinella norrisii Guérin-Méneville, 1844; Coccinella chevrolatii Guérin-Méneville, 1844; Neda bremei Mulsant, 1850; Neda finitima Mulsant, 1850; Neda fasciolata Mulsant, 1850; Neda subdola Mulsant, 1850; Neda perfida Mulsant, 1850

= Neda norrisii =

Species of beetle

Neda norrisii is a species of beetle of the family Coccinellidae. It is found in Colombia and Ecuador.
