= Neda (given name) =

Neda is a unisex given name. It may refer to:

- Neda (princess), ruler of the medieval South Slavic state of Duklja from 1043 to 1046
- Neda Agha-Soltan (1983–2009), student shot dead during the 2009 Iranian election protests
- Neda Al-Hilali (born 1938), American fiber artist
- Neda Alijani (born 1981), Iranian physician and professor
- Neda Arnerić (1953–2020), Serbian actress
- Neda Bahi (born 1992), Tunisian Paralympic athlete
- Neda Bokan (born 1947), Serbian mathematician
- Neda Hassani (1977–2003), Iranian dissident
- Neda Kozić (born 1985), Serbian tennis coach and former tennis player
- Neda Krmpotić (1921–1974), Croatian and Yugoslav journalist
- Neda Maghbouleh, American-born Canadian sociologist and writer
- Neda Moridpour, Iranian-born American artist and activist
- Neda Naldi (1913–1993), Italian actress
- Neda Parmać (born 1985), Croatian singer and member of Feminnem
- Neda Shahsavari (born 1986), Iranian table tennis player
- Neda Soltani (born 1977), Iranian exile, mistaken for Neda Agha-Soltan
- Neda Spasojević (1941–1981), Serbian actress
- Neda Ukraden (born 1950), Croatian pop singer
- Neda Ulaby (born 1970), American journalist

== Men ==
- Neda Imasuen (born 1958), Nigerian politician and lawyer
- Neda Mohammad, Afghan politician, member of the Taliban and Minister of Higher Education since 2022
