= Australoneda maai =

Scientific classification
- Kingdom: Animalia
- Phylum: Arthropoda
- Clade: Pancrustacea
- Class: Insecta
- Order: Coleoptera
- Suborder: Polyphaga
- Infraorder: Cucujiformia
- Family: Coccinellidae
- Genus: Australoneda
- Species: A. maai

Binomial name
- Australoneda maai (Bielawski, 1963)

Synonyms
- Neda maai Bielawski, 1963

Species of beetle

Australoneda maai is a species of beetle of the family Coccinellidae. It is found in Papua New Guinea and Indonesia (Western New Guinea).

== Description ==
Adults reach a length of about 8.4 mm (0.33 in). The head is yellowish brown, with a black frontal area. The pronotum is black with a yellow area. The scutellum is black and the elytra are black, but each with two light yellow spots.
