= Walter Bud =

German painter

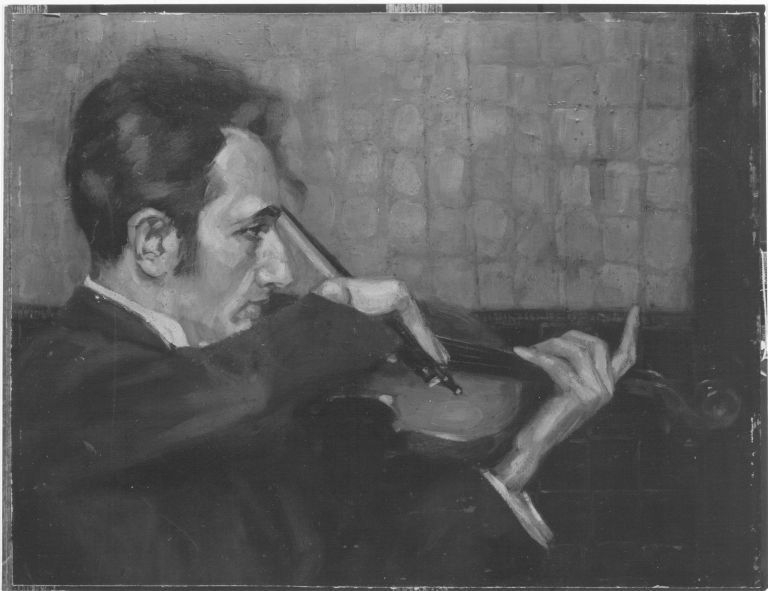
Portrait of Walter Bud by Leo Rauth (13205, Bavarian State Painting Collections)

Walter Bud (born 1 August 1890 in Leipzig; died 11 May 1915 in the Battle of Ypres) was a German painter.

== Literature ==
- Bud, Walter. In: Hans Vollmer (ed): Allgemeines Lexikon der bildenden Künstler des XX. Jahrhunderts. Band 1: A–D. E. A. Seemann, Leipzig 1953, p. 343.
- Volker Frank: Bud, Walter. In: Allgemeines Künstlerlexikon. Die Bildenden Künstler aller Zeiten und Völker (AKL). Band 15, Saur, München u. a. 1996, ISBN 3-598-22755-8, p. 11.
- Christian Lenz et al. (rev.): Deutsche Künstler von Marées bis Slevogt. Hirmer, München 2003 (= Bayerische Staatsgemäldesammlungen München: Catalogues of Paintings, vol. 8) ISBN 3777497800
