= Hermann Kätelhön =

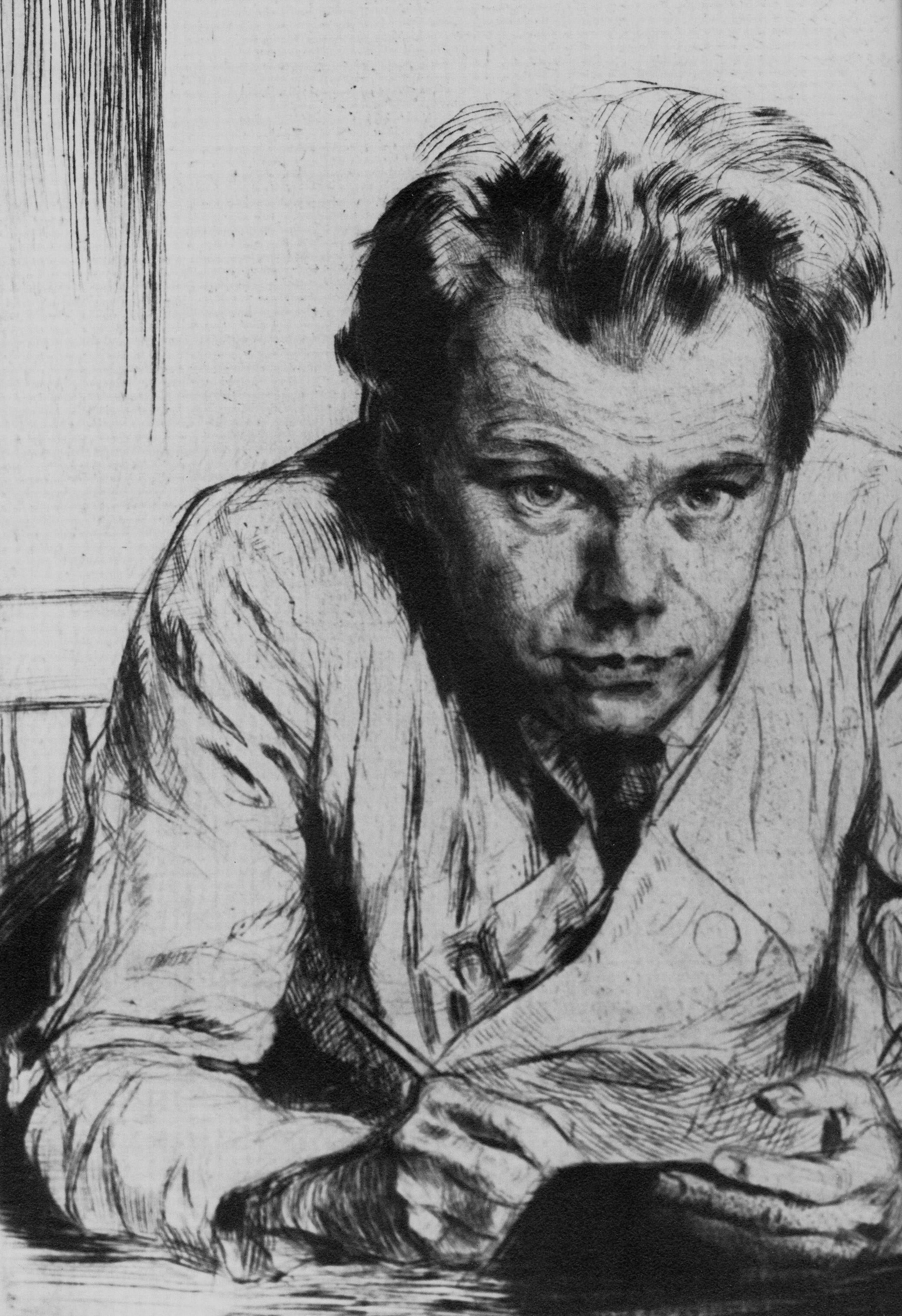
Hermann Kätelhön

Hermann Kätelhön (22 September 1884 Hofgeismar, – 24 November 1940 Munich) was a German illustrator and ceramicist noted for creating realistic etchings, lithographs and wood cuts.

Kätelhön was born in Hesse. In 1908 he joined the Willingshäuser artists colony.

He moved to Essen, in the Ruhr, where he started documenting the industrial landscape.
