= Schwalmstadt =

- Town
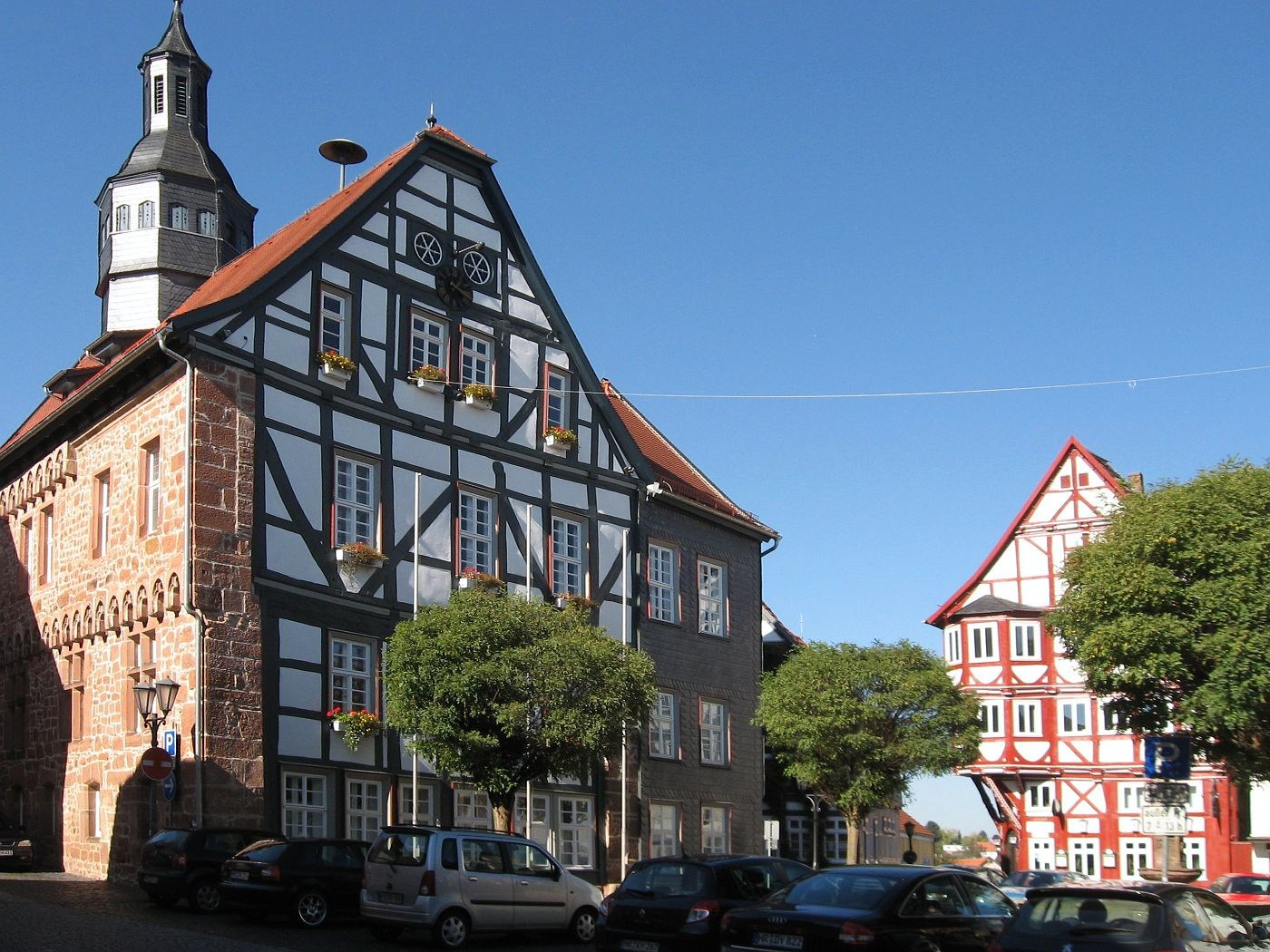
- Town hall in Treysa

- Coat of arms

- Location of Schwalmstadt within Schwalm-Eder-Kreis district
- Interactive map of Schwalmstadt
- Location within Germany Location within Hesse
- Coordinates: 50°56′N 09°13′E
- Country: Germany
- State: Hesse
- Admin. region: Kassel
- District: Schwalm-Eder-Kreis
- Subdivisions: 13 Stadtteile

Government
  - Mayor (2022–28): Tobias Kreuter

Area
  - Total: 84.79 km^{2} (32.74 sq mi)
- Elevation: 234 m (768 ft)

Population (2025-12-31)
  - Total: 18,482
  - Density: 218.0/km^{2} (564.5/sq mi)
- Time zone: UTC+01:00 (CET)
  - Summer (DST): UTC+02:00 (CEST)
- Postal codes: 34613
- Dialling codes: 06691
- Vehicle registration: HR
- Website: www.schwalmstadt.de

Schwalmstadt (German pronunciation: [ˈʃvalmˌʃtat]) is the largest town in the Schwalm-Eder district, in northern Hesse, Germany. It was established only in 1970 with the amalgamation of the towns of Treysa and Ziegenhain together with some outlying villages to form the town of Schwalmstadt.

== Geography ==
=== Location ===
Schwalmstadt lies in the Schwalm region in the western Knüll, a low mountain range. Through the town flows the river Schwalm. The nearest large towns are Kassel (about 50 km to the north), Bad Hersfeld (about 35 km to the east), Marburg (about 40 km to the southwest) and Fulda (about 70 km to the southeast).

=== Constituent communities ===
Besides the core of Treysa, Ziegenhain and Ascherode, the town consists of the centres of Allendorf an der Landsburg, Dittershausen, Florshain, Frankenhain, Michelsberg, Niedergrenzebach, Rommershausen, Rörshain, Trutzhain and Wiera.

== History ==
In the 8th century, Treise was owned by the Abbots of Hersfeld. The Counts of Cigenhagen were named in a document for the first time in 1144. In 1186, Treysa was taken over by the Counts and fortified. Treysa's landmark, the Martinskirche (Church of St. Martin), nowadays known as the Totenkirche (Church of the Dead), was built in 1230. Treysa was granted town rights sometime between 1229 and 1270, and the same rights were bestowed upon Ziegenhain in 1274. After the last Count's death in 1450, the county passed to Hesse.

The Landgraves of Hesse had the castle in Ziegenhain remodelled into a stately home in 1470, and then between 1537 and 1548, Philip I, Landgrave of Hesse had it built into a fortification with a moat.

In August 1945, the proceedings to establish the Evangelical Church in Germany (EKD) took place in Treysa in an event known as the Church Conference of Treysa. The meeting brought about the merger of the Lutheran, Reformed and United state churches. Two further church gatherings in May 1946 and June 1947 tried to start discussion about divergent perceptions of the Eucharist, and also dealt with Denazification.

As part of Hesse's municipal reforms, the two towns of Treysa and Ziegenhain, along with their outlying villages, were united in 1970 into the Town of Schwalmstadt, and ever since then they have existed only as constituent communities of a larger municipality.

In 1995, with the motto "Hessisch Willkommen", Schwalmstadt hosted the 35th Hessentag state festival.

=== Rommershausen ===
In the Marburg State Archive, Rommerhausen is first mentioned under the name "Rumershusen" in 1243. In 1360 it was called "Romirshusin" and in 1365 "Rumershusen", but it has gone by its current name since 1419.

On 3 April 1916 at 15:30, a cosmic lump of iron fell to earth in a woodlot near Rommershausen. This was later named, after the place where it was found, the Meteorite of Rommershausen, and it has gone down in German astronomic history as Germany's greatest verifiable observed meteorite impact.

Rommershausen has been part of Schwalmstadt since the municipal reforms in the 1970s.

=== Trutzhain ===
During the Second World War, Ziegenhain was home to a prisoner of war camp, Stalag IX-A (one of the French prisoners there, François Mitterrand, later became President of France), and after the war, also to a displaced persons camp at the same facility. The camp is now the constituent community of Trutzhain. Some of the barracks still stand and have been converted into houses.

== Politics ==
Schwalmstadt Town Council has 37 members. As of the municipal elections held in 2011, the council seats are apportioned thus:

=== Council ===
Parties and voting blocks		% 2011	Seats 2011	% 2006	Seats 2006
SPD	SPD	41.3	15	42.5	16
CDU	CDU	29.6	11	31.9	12
The Greens	Alliance '90/The Greens	14.4	5	8.4	3
FWG	FWG (citizens' coalition)	7.1	3	8.7	3
FDP	FDP	4.4	2	5.2	2
The Left	Left Party	3.1	1	3.4	1
Total		100.0	37	100.0	37
Voter turnout in %		46.1		46.3	

Mayor Wilhelm Kröll (SPD) was re-elected on 7 May 2006 with a share of the vote of 61.4%. On 3 June 2012, Dr. Gerald Näser (CDU) was elected new mayor with 53% of the vote. His opponent was Dr. Fabio Longo of the SPD. The turnout was 54.1%. Näser took office on 1 October 2012. He died in 2016 and was temporarily replaced by Detlef Schwierzeck (SPD). In 2016, Stefan Pinhard was elected as the new mayor and took office on 1 December 2016.

=== Coat of arms ===
Schwalmstadt's civic coat of arms might be heraldically described thus: Or a goat-headed spreadeagle sable armed, langued and attired gules, surmounted by a roundel argent in which a mullet of six of the third.

The heraldic elements are historical symbols from both former towns and the old County of Ziegenhain.

Schwalmstadt's coat of arms bears a keen likeness to both Neukirchen's and Schwarzenborn's.

=== Town partnerships ===
- Canton of Loriol-sur-Drôme, Département Drôme, France
- Zwalm, East Flanders, Belgium

== Public institutions ==
=== State institutions ===
==== Bundesanstalt Technisches Hilfswerk ====
Schwalmstadt's local THW association was founded in 1961. The local association has, among other things, a technical team (Technischer Zug) with a positioning section (Fachgruppe Ortung).

=== Educational institutions ===
- Eckhardt-Vonholt-Schule (primary school)
- Ziegenhainer Grundschule am Alleeplatz
- Brüder-Grimm-Schule Allendorf (primary school)
- Grundschule Niedergrenzebach
- Mittelpunkt Grundschule
- Herrmann-Schuchard-Schule
- Ludwig-Braun-Schule
- Schule im Ostergrund (Haupt- and Realschule)
- Friedrich-Trost-Schule
- Carl-Bantzer-Schule (comprehensive school)
- Sankt-Martin-Schule (school for learning aid)
- Schwalmgymnasium (Gymnasium)
- Berufliche Schulen Schwalmstadt (occupational school)
- Fachhochschule Hephata (Evangelische Fachhochschule Darmstadt)
- Stenografenverein 1925 Treysa e. V. (education centre, computer school)

=== Other ===
==== Sports and leisure ====
- Schwalmstadion (stadium)
- Stadion am Fünften (stadium)
- Landsburg Stadion Allendorf (stadium)
- Europabad und ein Freibad (swimming pools)
- Minigolf course
- Riding
- Inline skating path
- Youth centres
- Schwalmstadt gliding ground
- Recreational vehicle grounds
- several football fields

== Culture and sightseeing ==
=== Theatre ===
- Schwalmberg Open-Air Stage
- Totenkirche Open-Air Stage
- Castle Theatre (Burgtheater)
- Culture Hall (Kulturhalle)
- Trutzhain Theatre Club: "Trutzhainer Bühne"

=== Museums ===
- German Typewriter Museum (Deutsches Schreibmaschinenmuseum)
- Museum of the Schwalm, Ziegenhain
- Trutzhain Memorial and Museum

=== Buildings ===
- Treysa's and Ziegenhain's historic Old Towns with many half-timbered houses.
- Totenkirche with "Buttermilk Tower" in Treysa
- Town parish church
- Old Hospital in Treysa
- Hexenturm (Witches' Tower) in Treysa
- Schloss (stately home) with wall graves and parade square in Ziegenhain
- Town Hall and Johannisbrunnen (fountain) in Treysa

=== Other sights ===
- Hünengrab ("Giant's Grave") near Wiera

== Economy and infrastructure ==
=== Transport ===
Through Schwalmstadt run Federal Highways (Bundesstraßen) B 254 (from Fulda by way of Schwalmstadt to Kassel) and B 454 (from Bad Hersfeld by way of Schwalmstadt to Marburg). In the neighbouring community of Neuental ends (or begins) the Autobahn A 49.

The Main-Weser railway from Frankfurt to Kassel runs through Schwalmstadt and serves two stations: Treysa and Schwalmstadt-Wiera. There are hourly Regionalbahn trains from Kassel and the Mittelhessen-Express from Frankfurt ending at Treysa. In addition to that, Regionalexpress trains and InterCity trains between Kassel and Frankfurt stop hourly in turn. At the station of Schwalmstadt-Wiera there is an hourly connection to Frankfurt via the Mittelhessen-Express.

There was once a strategic railway running through the town between Berlin and Metz (the latter now in France), known as the Kanonenbahn, or "Cannons Railway".

=== Established businesses ===
- Erich Rohde Schuhfabriken (shoes)
- Konvekta AG (heating and air conditioning)
- Privatbrauerei Friedrich Haaß (brewery)
- Horn & Bauer Folientechnik (protective, packaging and technical films)
- Merkel-Freudenberg (gasket, packing, and sealing device manufacturing)
- Hephata Hessisches Diakoniezentrum e. V.
- Tieman (tank trucks, hoists, lifting devices)
- Heidelmann Kühlhaus und intl. Spedition (cold storage and international shipping)

=== Media ===
- Schwälmer Allgemeine (daily)
- Schwälmer Bote am Sonntag (Sundays)
- Schwälmer Bote am Mittwoch (Wednesdays)
- MAZ Mittelhessische Anzeigen Zeitung (Wednesdays)

=== Regular events ===
- Hutzelkirmes (fair in Treysa)
- Bockbieranstich (Bock beer tapping, Treysa)
- Salatkirmes (fair in Ziegenhain)
- Kirmes (fair) in Allendorf an der Landsburg
- Weindorf an der Totenkirche ("Wine village at the 'Church of the Dead'")
- Bahnhofstraßenfest ("Street Festival")
- "Ziegenhain vom Feinsten" ("Ziegenhain from its Finest")
- Schwälmer Inlinerlauf (inline skating)
- Weihnachtsmarkt (Christmas Market)
- Scherzmarkt ("Fun Market")
- Michaelismarkt
- Johannisfest ("John's Festival")
- "Sporthits für Kids" (Sportsfestival for kids)
- Kirmes in Niedergrenzebach (fair)
- Johannisfeuer (Niedergrenzebach) ("John's Fire", a midsummer festival)
- Theaterabend der Trutzhainer Bühne (Theatre Evening in Trutzhain)

== Personalities ==
=== Sons and daughters of the town ===
- Carl Bantzer, painter and art writer (born 6 August 1857 in Ziegenhain)
- Stanisław Kubicki, artist, poet, philosopher (born 1889 in Ziegenhain, died 1943 in Poland (murdered))
- Hans John, jurist and resistance fighter (born 1 August 1911 in Treysa, died 23 April 1945 in Berlin (executed))
- Guido Knopp, historian, publicist and TV moderator (born 29 January 1948 in Treysa)
- Wilhelm Böttner, Baroque painter (born 24 February 1752 in Ziegenhain, died 24 November 1805 in Kassel)
- Herbert Henck, pianist (born 28 July 1948 in Treysa)
- Roswitha Aulenkamp, composer, pianist, piano lecturer at the Musikakademie Kassel (born 20 June 19xx in Ziegenhain)
- Gereon Karl Goldmann (1916–2003) Franciscan father and former WW2 soldier and Nazi opponent.
- Alfred Hartenbach, Member of the Bundestag (SPD) (born 5 March 1948 in Niedergrenzebach)
- Gottlieb Dietrich, botanist and garden architect (born 9 March 1765 in Ziegenhain, died 2 January 1850 in Eisenach)
- Adam Dietrich, botanist (born 4 November 1711 in Ziegenhain, died 11 July 1782 in Ziegenhain)
- Albert Wigand (artist), painter (born 4 August 1890 in Ziegenhain, died 17 May 1978 in Leipzig)
- Julius Weiffenbach, jurist (born 26 April 1837 in Ziegenhain, died 29 June 1910 in Berlin)
- Konrad Wiederhold, colonel (born 20 April 1598? in Ziegenhain, died 13 June 1667 in Kirchheim)
- Klaus Stern, documentary filmmaker (born 1968 in Ziegenhain)
- Otto Stern, one of the founders and first president (1955) of the Dairy Food Association of America (Born November 21, 1897 in Ziegenhain) He fled Germany with his family in mid-1930s when Nazis revoked citizenship to Jews.
