= Treysa =

- Stadtteil of Schwalmstadt
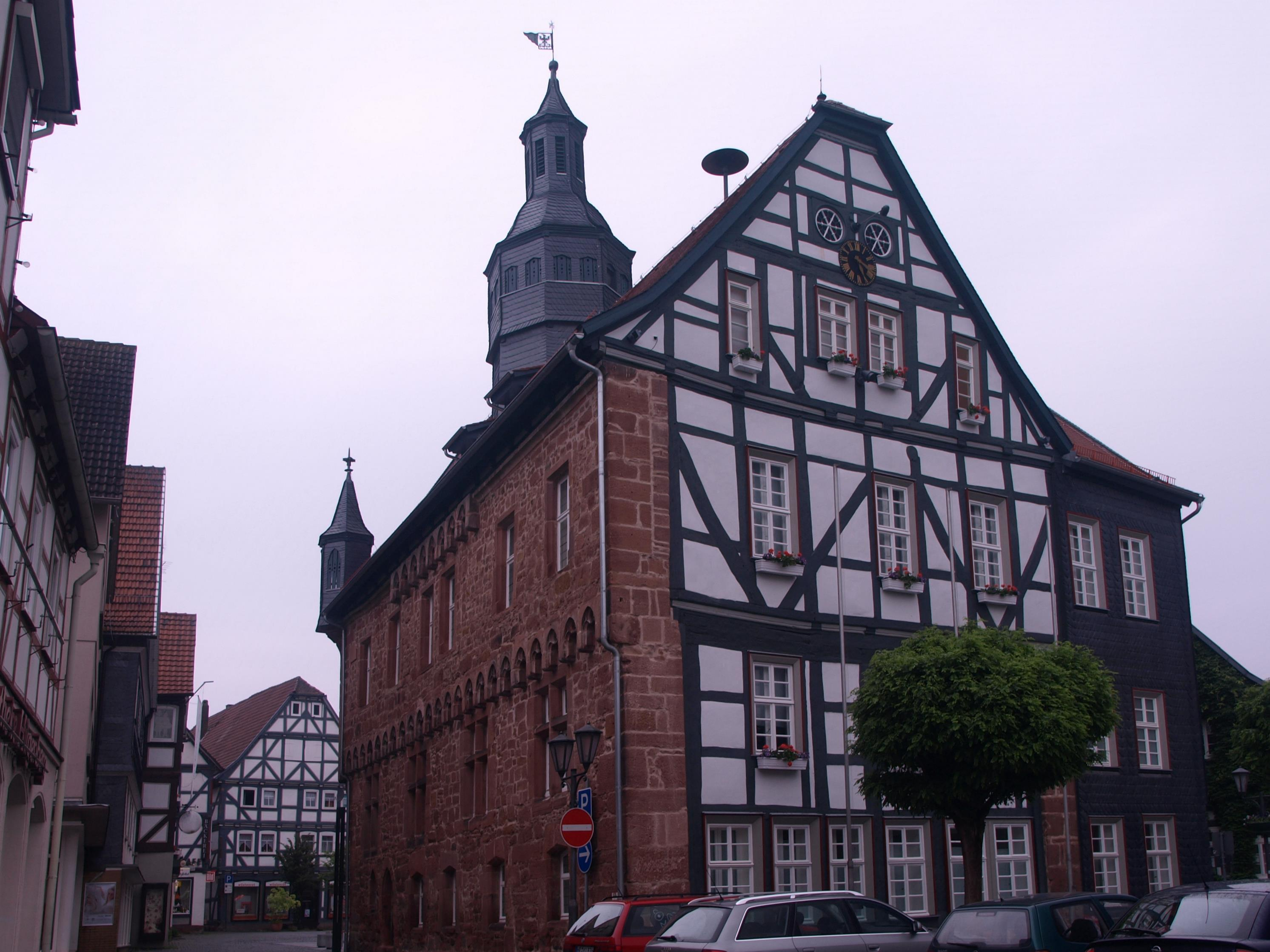

- Coat of arms
- Interactive map of Treysa
- Location within Germany Location within Hesse
- Coordinates: 50°54′N 9°11′E
- Country: Germany
- State: Hesse
- Admin. region: Kassel
- District: Schwalm-Eder-Kreis
- Town: Schwalmstadt
- Elevation: 237 m (778 ft)

Population (2018-12-31)
  - Total: 8,653
- Time zone: UTC+01:00 (CET)
  - Summer (DST): UTC+02:00 (CEST)
- Postal codes: 34613
- Dialling codes: 06691
- Vehicle registration: HR

Treysa, an independent town until 1970, is the biggest Stadtteil of the German town Schwalmstadt. It was incorporated into Schwalmstadt in December 1970. The location around Treysa and Schwalmstadt is called Schwalm. The historic city lies on a hill which is up to 35 meters higher than the valley where the river Wiera enters in the Schwalm. To protect the city of floods, a detention basin had been built.

During the 8th century, the city Treise was a part of the Hersfeld Abbey. The counts of the district Ziegenhain, who have been reeves of the Abbey, conquered Treysa in 1186. The town's landmark is the so-called Totenkirche, which has been earlier called Martinskirche and had been built in 1230. Between 1229 and 1270, Treysa received its town charter. After the death of the last count of Ziegenhain, the complete countship entered into possession of the Landgraviate of Hesse. In August 1945, there had been conferences about the founding of the Evangelical Church in Germany in Treysa. On 31 December 1970, the district Treysa had been incorporated to Schwalmstadt.

== Transport ==
Treysa station is on the Main to Weser railway from Frankfurt to Kassel. There are express trains (InterCitys of the DB Fernverkehr AG) making stops at Treysa station as do local trains.

The federal highway 454 goes through Treysa. Some bicycle routes go through Treysa. The most popular route is the bikeway R4 of Hesse.

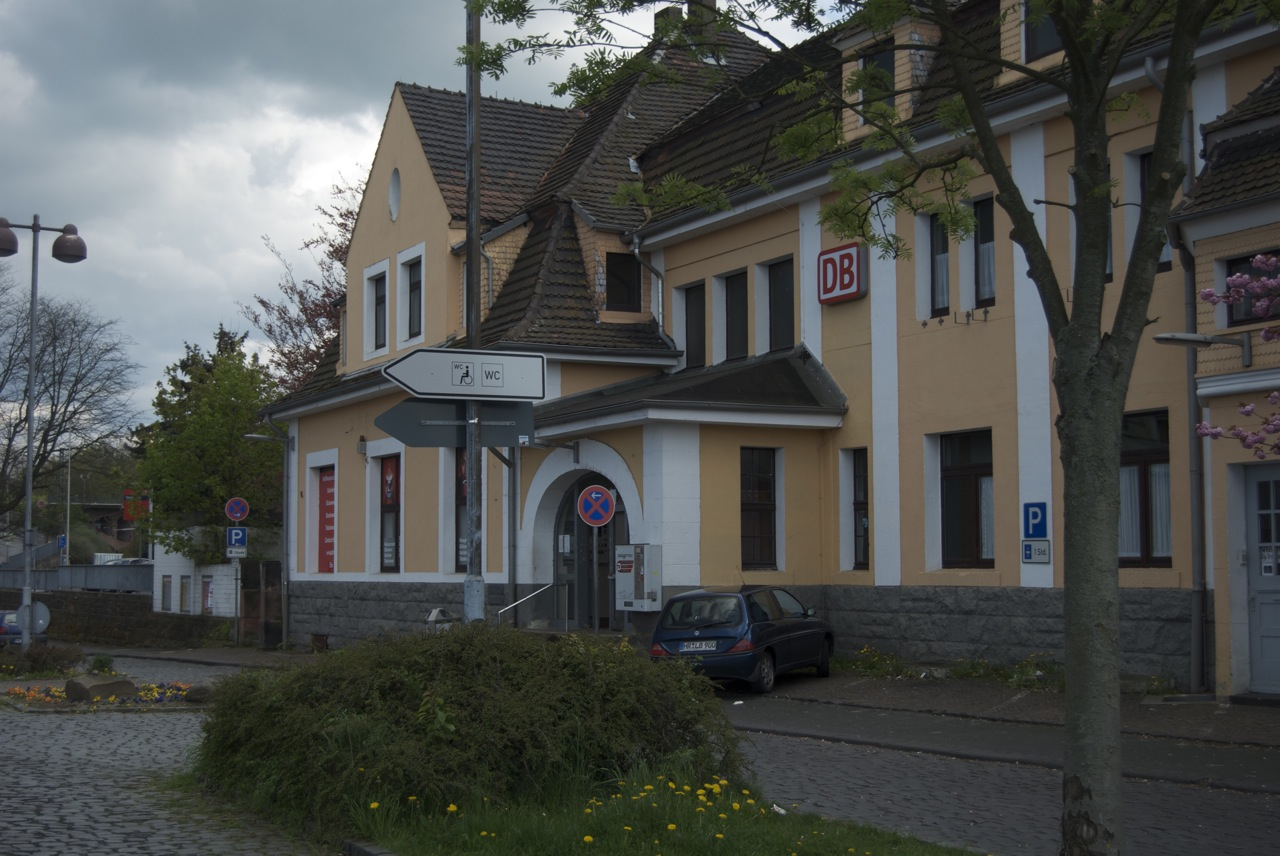
