= John VII of Nassau-Siegen =

German count and military theorist (1561–1623)

John VII, Count of Nassau-Siegen
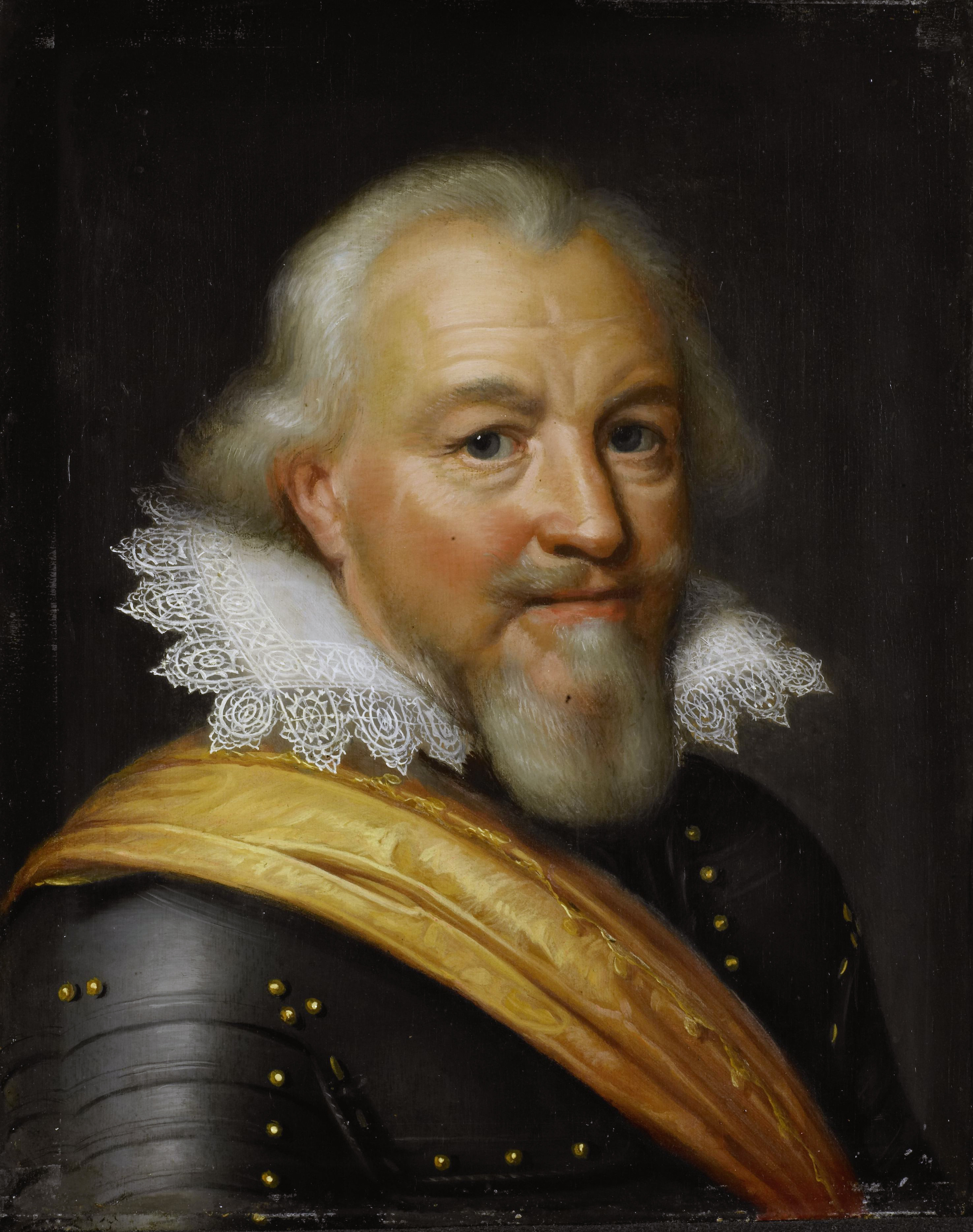
- Count John VII the Middle of Nassau-Siegen. Studio of Jan Antonisz. van Ravesteyn, c. 1610–1620. Rijksmuseum Amsterdam.

Count of Nassau-Siegen
- Coat of arms
- Reign: 1606–1623
- Predecessor: John VI the Elder
- Successor: John VIII the Younger
- Full name: John VII the Middle, Count of Nassau-Siegen
- Native name: Johann VII. der Mittlere Graf von Nassau-Siegen
- Born: Johann Graf zu Nassau, Katzenelnbogen, Vianden und Diez, Herr zu Beilstein; 7 June 1561; Siegen Castle
- Died: 27 September 1623 (aged 62); Siegen Castle
- Buried: 5/15 November 1623; St. Nicholas Church, Siegen; Reburied: 29 April 1690; Fürstengruft, Siegen
- Noble family: House of Nassau-Siegen
- Spouses: Magdalene of Waldeck-Wildungen; Margaret of Schleswig-Holstein-Sonderburg
- Issue Detail: John Ernest; John VIII the Younger; Elisabeth; Adolf; Juliane; Anne Mary; John Albert; William; Anne Joanne; Frederick Louis; Magdalene; John Frederick; John Maurice; George Frederick; William Otto; Louise Christine; Sophie Margaret; Henry; Mary Juliane; Amalie; Bernhard; Christian; Catharine; John Ernest; Elisabeth Juliane
- Father: John VI the Elder of Nassau-Siegen
- Mother: Elisabeth of Leuchtenberg
- Occupation: Colonel general of the Palatinate; Commander-in-chief of the Swedish army

Count John VII the Middle of Nassau-Siegen (7 June 1561 – 27 September 1623), German: Johann VII. der Mittlere Graf von Nassau-Siegen, official titles: Graf zu Nassau, Katzenelnbogen, Vianden und Diez, Herr zu Beilstein, was since 1606 Count of Nassau-Siegen, a part of the County of Nassau, and the progenitor of the House of Nassau-Siegen, a cadet branch of the Ottonian Line of the House of Nassau.

John was one of the most important military theorists of his time, who introduced many innovations and inventions. His Kriegsbuch contained all the military knowledge of his time, but also many new ideas, which made an essential contribution to the reform of the Dutch States Army by his cousin Maurice. John served in the Dutch States Army, was colonel general of the Palatinate and commander-in-chief of the Swedish army. His reputation reached far beyond the borders of the Holy Roman Empire. As a mediator, John successfully continued the example set by his grandfather William the Rich.

== Biography ==
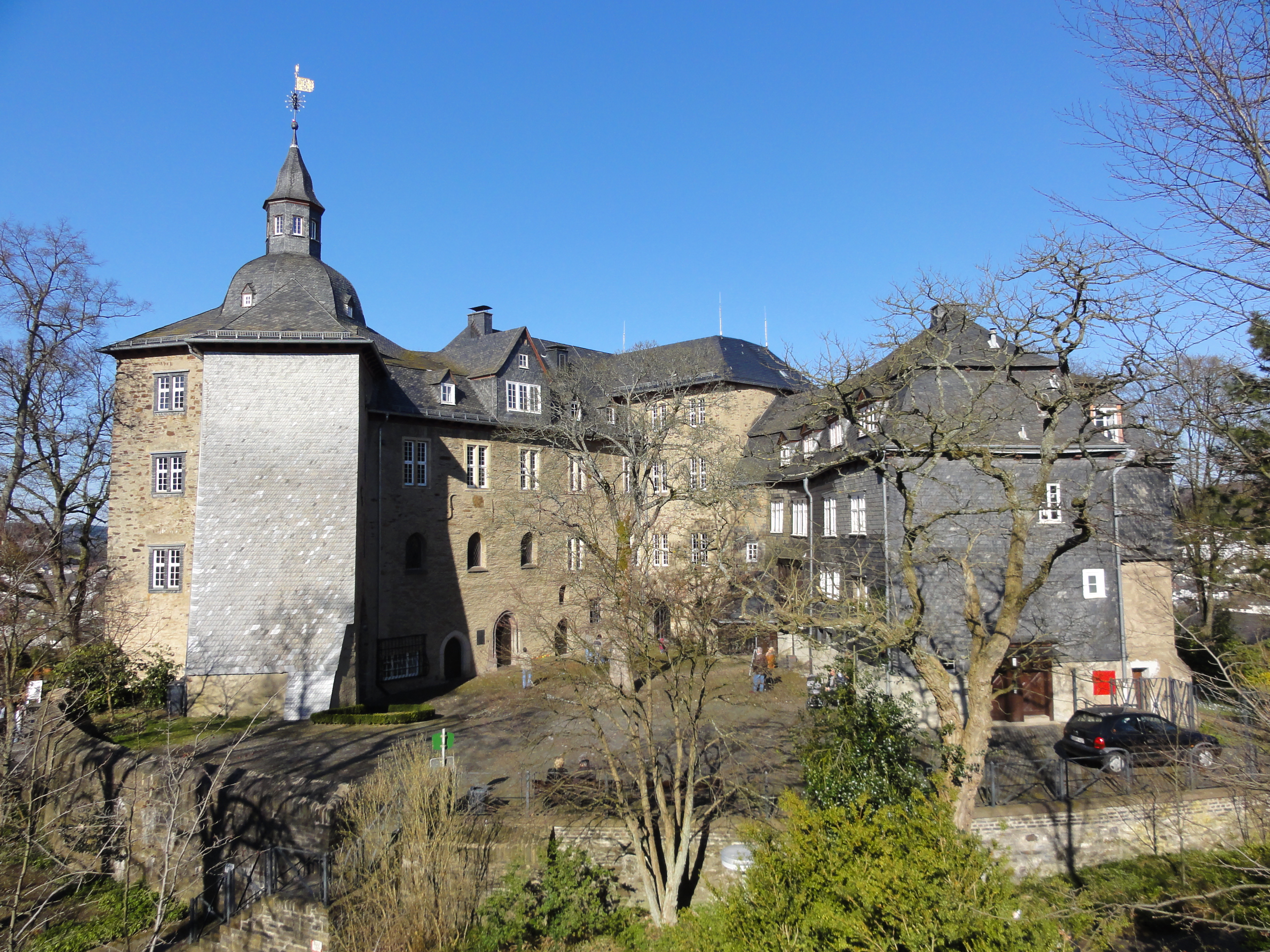
Siegen Castle, 2011.

John was born at Siegen Castle (Note: Glawischnig (1974) states that he was born in Siegen. All older sources that mention a place of birth, state that he was born in Dillenburg.) on 7 June 1561 as the second son of Count John VI the Elder of Nassau-Siegen and his first wife Landgravine Elisabeth of Leuchtenberg.

John first attended the Counts' School in Siegen and then – in 1576 – went to the Heidelberg University together with his three oldest brothers William Louis, George and Philip and his cousin Maurice of Nassau, but left the university the following year at his father's request. He did not regret his departure at all, because he found "das Studieren nicht anmutig" ("studying not graceful"). John got involved early in the administration, finances and military affairs of his father's county.

John the Elder had plans to reorganise the finances of the county of Nassau-Siegen through a rich marriage of his son, but when John the Middle declared that he had already given his heart, the father did not make the slightest attempt to let political reason prevail over the son's wish. This speaks for the characters of father and son, who always got along very well and complemented each other in the best way. By his marriage in 1581 to Countess Magdalene of Waldeck-Wildungen (like his grandmother Countess Juliane of Stolberg-Wernigerode, widow of a count of Hanau-Münzenberg), John the Middle strengthened the relations within the Wetterauer Grafenverein and thus contributed – even without a substantial financial contribution – to the strengthening of the House of Nassau.

=== Military career ===
==== Contributing to his father's military reform ====
John experienced his first military campaign under Count Palatine John Casimir in 1583, (Note: According to Dek (1970), p. 86, John already served in the army of Count Palatine John Casimir in 1578.) for which troops were assembled in the area of Siegen. At that time, John became acquainted with the practice of mercenary armies, whose disadvantages his father had described in numerous conversations.

From 1584 onwards, John was engaged in reinforcing the fortifications of Nassau Castle and Dillenburg Castle. During the military reform of John the Elder, especially his introduction of general conscription, John the Middle ensured better training. Realising that conscripted subjects should not be led helplessly to the slaughter, he ensured that the men were properly trained. He ordered standardised rifles of the same caliber for them, so that one could help the other with bullets. And he created uniform clothing, clearly aware that the men would feel like soldiers in that uniform. Uniforms and standardised armaments were something entirely new for that time. The Siegerländer Landesausschluß wore a brown hat with a feather and a blue lining, a yellow leather or linen gambeson, a red overcoat with a blue lining and a white collar. Trousers and socks were blue. This uniform corresponded with the costume which had already been acquired in 1481/82 in the Netherlands for the men of the Siegen marksmen's guild.

For weapons training, John invented the foot drill. The men were favourably inclined towards this measure, because they saw for themselves how they could gain a huge amount of time by continuous practice in handling weapons and thus had a great advantage over their opponents. In Nassau, and especially in the Siegerland where it was introduced first, there was never any protest against the general conscription, because the population considered the Counts' struggle for the freedom of the Netherlands as their own. They shared with the territorial lord the biblically founded conviction of the right of this Dutch Revolt against the rape of body and soul.

==== In the Dutch States Army ====
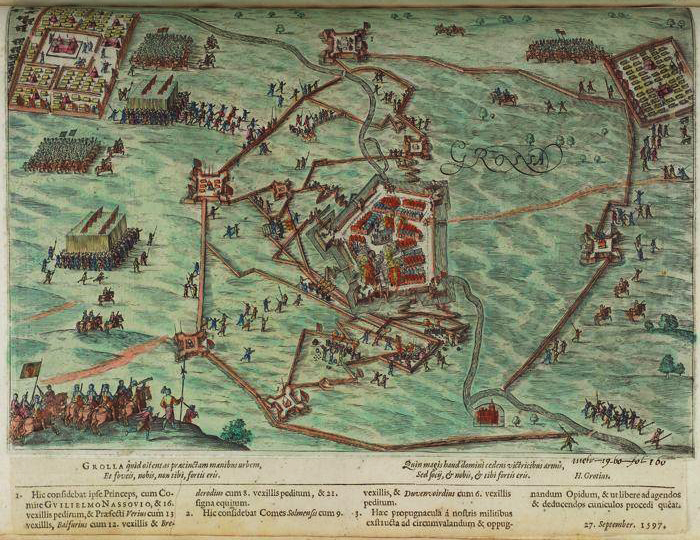
The Siege of Groenlo in 1597. From the Spieghel ofte afbeeldinghe der Nederlandtsche Geschiedenissen, 1613.

Relatively late, in 1592, John entered the Dutch Revolt. There he participated in the sieges of Steenwijk and Coevorden. With Prince Maurice, he was more like a brother than as a cousin, because they had spent their youth together in Dillenburg and Siegen. When John showed him and his brother William Louis his notes containing his thoughts on military training, it was "nun wol im anfang ein solches veracht und für Superfluum gehalten" ("despised in the beginning and thought to be superfluous"). But soon Maurice had to realise that the Ausschußmänner from the county of Nassau-Siegen and the equally trained peasants from the Westerwald were better than the Dutch soldiers. Immediately, John's approach was introduced into all garrisons of the United Provinces. A new type of mortar invented by John, together with the corresponding incendiary bullets, both of which he had made cast in Siegen, was tested at the Siege of Groenlo in 1597 and had a devastating effect.

==== Military theorist ====
John put his thoughts on paper when they occurred to him: under the titles Observationes, Landesrettungswerk, Memorial, Discours, etc. Together they form a Kriegsbuch that reflects all military knowledge of the time, but above all contains a wealth of completely new ideas, from the art of large fortifications to the most advantageous arrangement of a 'secret chamber'. John's military writings laid the foundation for the supremacy of the Dutch States Army and thus constituted an essential contribution to the victory. They were republished in 1973. (Note: See: Hahlweg, Werner (1973). Die Heeresreform der Oranier. Das Kriegsbuch des Grafen Johann von Nassau-Siegen. Veröffentlichungen der Historischen Kommission für Nassau (in German). Vol. 20. Wiesbaden: Historische Kommission für Nassau.) John was one of the most important military theorists of his time and his reputation reached far beyond the borders of the Holy Roman Empire.

==== Commander-in-Chief of the Swedish Army ====
In the great theatre of operations of the Counter-Reformation, King Sigismund III, the Catholic Vasa, had united Poland and Sweden in his hand. His uncle, the Calvinist Duke Charles of Södermanland led the opposition to Sigismund. John thought it was a matter for Protestants to support Charles. Therefore, with the consent of the Wetterauer Grafenverein, he travelled to the battlefield in Livonia. However, he first visited his brother William Louis in Friesland, and only when the latter also approved of the plan and John knew that Nassau was in the care of his brother, did he go to Charles, whom he met in Pernau on 16 July 1601. Charles immediately offered John the supreme command, (Note: According to Dek (1970), p. 86 and Dek (1968), p. 234, Charles appointed John as field marshal. According to Lück & Wunderlich (1956), p. 32 and Vorsterman van Oyen (1882), p. 115, Charles appointed John as general and field marshal. Glawischnig (1974) and Joachim (1881), p. 266 mention, like Lück (1981), p. 95, no rank, but only that it concerned the supreme command.) which he accepted "trotz der geringen Lusten" ("despite the low desire"), but only for a period of three months, because the Swedish army was in a more than poor condition. The foot soldiers, for instance, were so miserably armed that John devised and immediately ordered the production of spiked carts, which were pushed in front of the infantry and proved to be a great protection against the attacking cavalry. Such spiked carts were kept in the arsenal of Siegen for decades.

After three months, during which John had won several skirmishes and captured much material from the Poles, but had not been able to bring the Siege of Riga to a successful conclusion, Charles begged him to stay in Livonia and remain in command. John accepted his plea. Immediately afterwards, the cold became so fierce that within six weeks 40,000 people either froze or starved to death, including 4,500 of the 6,000 foot soldiers from Nassau. And again, after three months, John was persuaded to stay. Then, however, first the thaw set in and then a mutiny put an end to all military operations. John wrote in vain to get money to pay the troops. He had long since pawned his collars and jewellery for the troops' wages. Finally, he really resigned from his duties. Charles provided a Swedish naval ship for the journey to Lübeck, which had to remain on Bornholm for a long time due to violent storms. John's wages of 18,000 guilders had still not been paid by the Swedes 29 years later.

And yet the arduous northern journey had brought John something good. He met the youngest daughter of Duke John II the Younger of Schleswig-Holstein-Sonderburg (a brother of the Danish king) and married her in 1603, although he already had a son a year older than this Margaret of Schleswig-Holstein-Sonderburg. John's first wife had died in 1599.

==== In the service of the Palatinate ====
In 1599, Elector Palatine Frederick IV offered John the post of colonel general to reorganise the country's defences. In 1610 John was commander of the Palatine Union troops.

When the Upper Palatinate (where his mother came from) was threatened, the fact that John was ready with thirteen companies of cavalry and six companies of footsoldiers on the Neidenau Heath was enough to keep the enemy, the Passau-Leopoldine folk, from attacking. After this brief appearance in the Upper Palatinate, the city of Nuremberg prepared a welcome for him "wie sonst nicht leichthin geschieht und nur Wenigen widerfährt" ("as otherwise does not happen lightly and happens to only a few").

In 1621 he organised the defence of the Palatinate against the Spaniards under Spinola. However, the Spanish pressure on Nassau forced him to retreat prematurely and thus ruined his life's work.

=== Advocate of Protestant Unity ===
John was a champion of Protestant political unity against the forces of the Counter-Reformation. However, he rarely achieved greater political influence. Therefore, he lacked the necessary perseverance, despite high intelligence, diligence and agility. The extent of John's ambitious political plans and the power of a Protestant Union, as he imagined it, is best shown by the fact that in 1598 he seriously wanted to promote the idea of electing his cousin Maurice of Nassau as German king.

One of the leading Protestant figures of that time was Fürst Christian I of Anhalt-Bernburg, who, like John, aspired to a great Protestant alliance against the Habsburgs. But Emperor Rudolf II tried to lure Christian with promises. The fact that Christian did not succumb to this, but remained in the Protestant camp, was regarded by both as John's merit. Christian and John became good friends. Their common goal was to win over Elector Joachim Frederick of Brandenburg to the Protestant cause, and to this end they wanted to help him acquire the disputed duchy of Jülich-Cleves-Berg. Landgrave Maurice of Hesse-Kassel joined them, and in 1603 the latter married Juliane, the 16-year-old daughter of John.

On 25 March 1609, Duke John William of Jülich-Cleves-Berg died childless. His inheritance was claimed by Palatine Neuburg, Brandenburg, Saxony and Palatine Zweibrücken. The first two candidates were Protestants, the other two Catholics. John, who always wanted the unity of the Protestant camp, wanted to avoid a war between Brandenburg and Palatine Neuburg at all costs, and during preparatory negotiations in Siegen and on 10 June 1609 in Dortmund, he managed to get Count Palatine Wolfgang William of Neuburg and Elector John Sigismund of Brandenburg to agree on a common approach. Both asked John to take over the supreme command of their troops, in case the inheritance dispute could not be solved without force of arms. The Landesrettungsverein of the Wetterau appointed him colonel, because all trained young nobles were in foreign service. As a mediator, John successfully continued the example set by his grandfather William the Rich.

In September 1610, as an envoy of the Protestant Imperial Estates of the realm, John negotiated with the leader of the Catholic League, Duke Maximilian I of Bavaria, where they reached a mutually satisfactory agreement. In 1615, he mediated an agreement between the city Brunswick and Duke Frederick Ulrich of Brunswick-Wolfenbüttel.

When the young Elector Palatine Frederick V was urged by the Protestant Imperial Estates to accept the Bohemian crown, he did so after extensive consultation with John and Christian I of Anhalt-Bernburg. And while Frederick went to Bohemia to rule that one winter (for which he was later called the Winter King), John prepared the Palatinate for defence. He was also commissioned to draw up plans to strengthen the Rhine from Bonn to Rheinberg, to modernise the fortress of Düsseldorf and to design a system of fortifications for the Ruhr, Ems and Lippe rivers. He had to prepare the national defence for Berg, Mark and Cleves, after he had refused the post of Field Marshal in Jülich.

=== Count of Nassau-Siegen ===
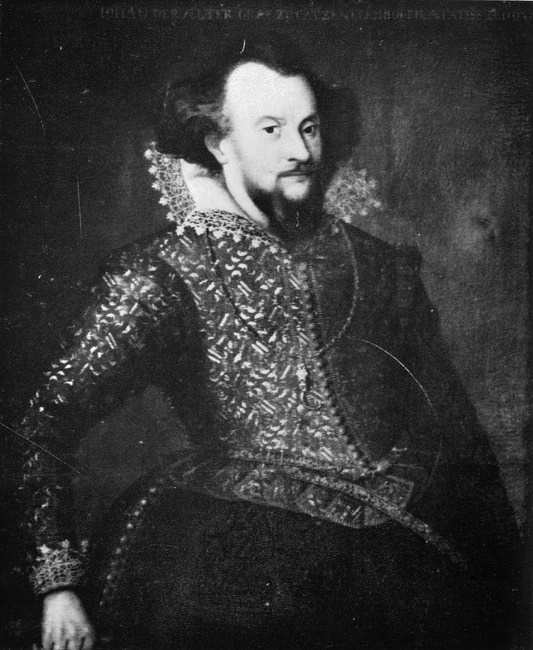
Count John VII of Nassau-Siegen. Anonymous portrait, 1611. Siegerlandmuseum, Siegen.

When his father died on 8 October 1606, John succeeded his father together with his brothers William Louis, George, Ernest Casimir and John Louis. On 30 March 1607 the brothers divided their possessions. John acquired Siegen, Freudenberg, Netphen, Hilchenbach, Ferndorf and the Haingericht. (Note: "The Haingericht was certainly located around the castle of Hainchen, which passed with its dependencies to the House of Nassau in 1313. See Historische Stätten Deutschlands III, 245.") The brothers then also signed a succession treaty. By this agreement the heirs of the brothers were explicitly forbidden to convert to a religion other than the Reformed confession. Since the partition, John has had his Residenz in Siegen Castle, which he had renovated around that time.

The sons of his first marriage caused John much and great concern. Both John Ernest and Adolf in The Hague and John the Younger in Kassel had the reputation of being gamblers and of showing a completely unseemly splendour in their clothes and appearance. John wrote letters to these young counts, full of fatherly admonitions, exhorting them to be thrifty, because he did not know what to do with his worries and debts. In a letter of 8 December 1608 he even considered the death of his son Adolf as a punishment from God and he exhorted the two others, who with "einem ärgerlichen Leben mit Verschwendung fast allem, was ich in der Welt habe, durch Ehebrechen und Hurerei, Plünderung und Beraubung armer, unschuldiger Leute hoch und niederen Standen" ("an annoying life of squandering almost everything I have in the world, through adultery and fornication, plundering and robbing poor, innocent people of high and low rank") ruined the county of Nassau-Siegen, to lead a different, better life, worthy of the name Nassau.

In 1610 John took part in the Princes' Day in Schwäbisch Hall as the representative of the entire House of Nassau and the Wetterauer Grafenverein. In 1612 he travelled to Frankfurt, with his brother George and his two sons John Ernest and John the Younger, for the coronation of Roman King Matthias, whom he congratulated as spokesman of the House of Nassau and many other counts. It was up to him to be the first to cut off a piece of the roast beef in front of the Römer and bring it to the royal table.

With his brothers he signed new succession treaties in 1611 and 1613. Noteworthy is the House Treaty with his brother George in 1618 about his not claiming the part of the county of Nassau-Dillenburg that was rightfully his. In 1619 he also signed a treaty with his brothers about the advances that had previously been paid to William the Silent. Finally, the brothers signed a treaty on the division of the lands that had become vacant after the death of William Louis of Nassau-Dillenburg and the debts attached to them.

After the outbreak of hostilities in the Thirty Years' War, he initially remained faithful to his old, long-standing connection with the Palatinate, and stayed behind as commander-in-chief of the troops stationed in the Palatinate. In this way, on the approach of the imperial troops and those of the Catholic League, he placed his own country in great danger. Yet it took the most urgent appeals of his brothers to persuade him at last to abandon his friend's cause and return to Siegen, where he, martial and capable as he was, diligently devoted himself to all preparations for the protection of town and country.

==== Foundation of the Kriegsschule ====
John's idea to give the Protestant cause good leaders for a people's army, was the reason for the Kriegsschule, founded in Siegen in 1616, probably the world's first military academy. The princes John asked for financial support, did not give him a penny. But despite the fact that he was so indebted by supporting the Dutch Revolt, that for some time he considered giving up his residence in Siegen and going to live with his brother William Louis, he nevertheless founded the school. At that time his wife Margaret wrote a letter to King Christian IV of Denmark, asking for the payment of an old debt. Possibly Danish money served to open the Kriegsschule. However, the Thirty Years' War broke out so early that the Kriegsschule in Siegen could not be effective and soon ceased to exist.

A strange twist of fate, however, made it possible for two of John's descendants to complete abroad what he was not able to complete. Count William of Schaumburg-Lippe founded the famous Portuguese War and Artillery Academy and in Schaumburg-Lippe the academy for artillery and military engineering (whose most famous pupil was Gerhard von Scharnhorst). The other descendant of John was Friedrich Wilhelm von Steuben, the organiser of the Continental Army and an important aide to George Washington.

==== Settlement of the succession by wills of 1607, 1618 and 1621 ====
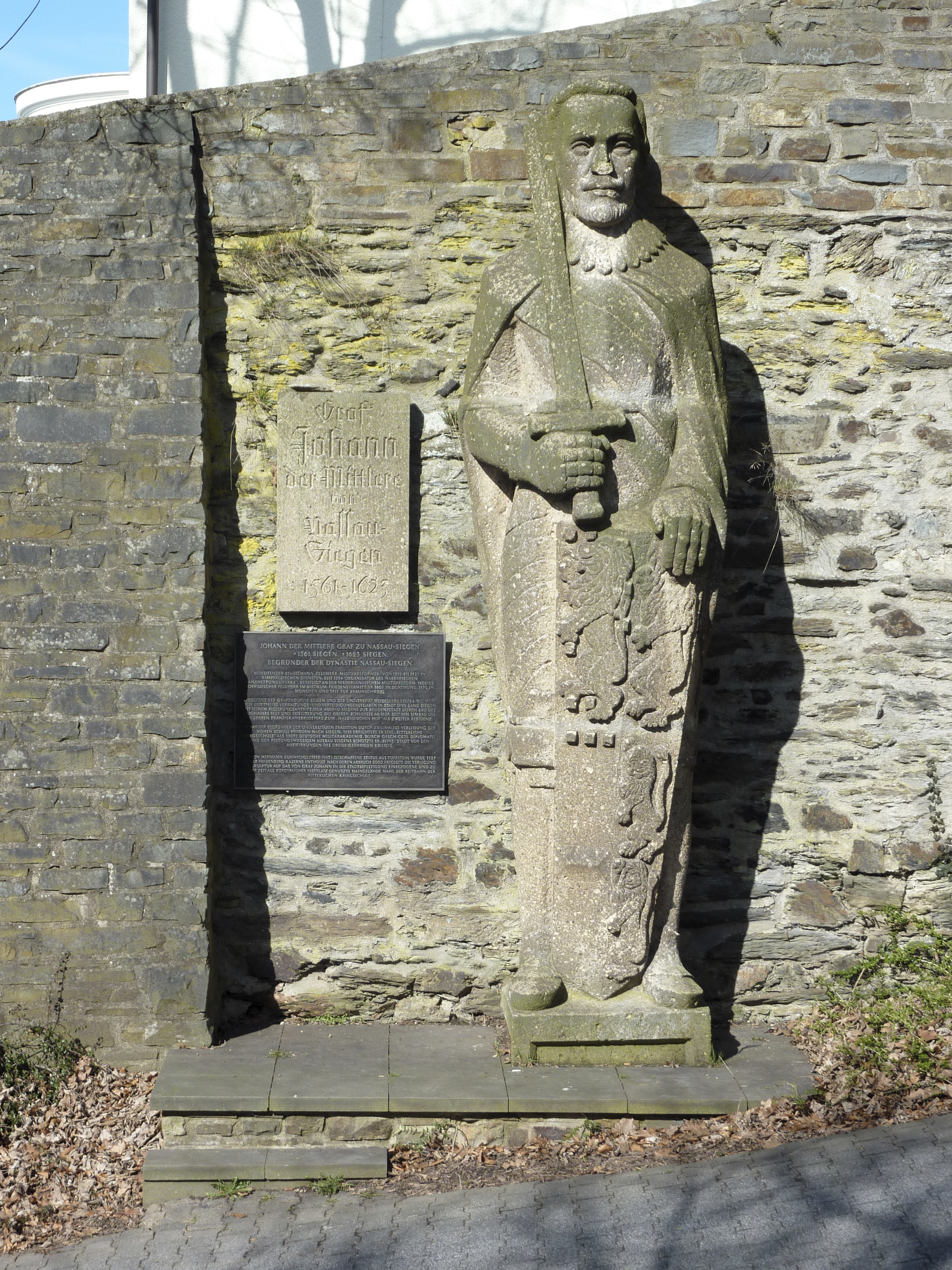
Monument and commemorative plaques for Count John VII of Nassau-Siegen on the inside of the western wall of Siegen Castle. Tuff sculpture by Hermann Kuhmichel, 1937. Photo: Frank Behnsen, 2011.

When John received the County of Nassau-Siegen in 1607, he decided that such a small country (it had about 9,000 inhabitants and yielded an annual revenue of about 13,000 guilders) should not be divided up again. In order to avoid this, he made a will and testament, which stated that only the eldest son would rule and the other children should be compensated with money or offices. As one of the most convinced advocates of Protestantism, it was particularly painful for John that his second son, John the Younger, converted to the Catholic Church in 1613. This act of his son overshadowed the last years of John's life and caused him great anxiety. In a codicil of 8 October 1613 he explicitly stipulated that his heirs had to keep the land in the Reformed confession. At first, the conversion of John the Younger to Catholicism did not change this house law established by the will, because he was not the eldest son. That was John Ernest.

To the great surprise of his relatives, John the Younger joined the Spaniards in 1617 and thus joined the opponents of the House of Nassau and the Dutch Republic. In the same year, his older brother John Ernest died in the service of the Republic of Venice. The transition of John the Younger to the political enemy hit his father as hard as the conversion to Catholicism had hit him. This new situation forced John to ask himself whether an enemy of Nassau and the Netherlands could remain his heir at all. On 15 November 1617, John declared his will of 8 April 1607 to be null and void. Abolition of the primogeniture would have meant a division of the small country, and therefore John opposed all proposals in that direction. Instead, in an amicable agreement, he had his son sign a declaration on 31 December 1617, in which the latter declared that, although he himself was and remained a Catholic, he would not force his subjects to any other than the existing religious confession. All his brothers advised John the Middle to change the primogeniture, but he firmly trusted the word, the letter and the seal of his son, whom he loved in spite of everything, as the latter loved and respected his father. It grieved them both that they had to hurt each other because of the difference in their beliefs. On 22 December 1618 John drew up a second will, which had the above-mentioned promises of his son as a condition and still held on to the primogeniture. However, he imposed the penalty of disinheritance on the introduction of 'papism'. He explicitly assumed that the Dutch branch of the House of Nassau would come to his aid, just as his father had come to William the Silent's aid. He therefore repeatedly turned to his cousin Maurice of Orange to obtain from him an assurance of assistance in the event that his son would not keep his word and would use force in Siegerland with the help of Spanish or imperial troops. But Maurice and the States General showed no interest at all in what was happening in the little County of Nassau-Siegen. This was a bitter disappointment to John, although, on the other hand, he realised that the Netherlands could not intervene everywhere and had enough problems of its own. For a while, he even considered placing a Dutch garrison in Siegen.

Why John the Middle still distrusted his son, in spite of the latter's confirmations, cannot be fully elucidated. Maybe it was because John the Younger loudly proclaimed everywhere that no power in the world could prevent him from succeeding in Nassau-Siegen, because the power of the Emperor and the King of Spain was behind him. Perhaps John the Middle also knew the influence of the de Ligne family and the Catholic clergy on his son. It is certain that such rumours were conveyed to him from all sides, and that his relatives and other Protestant Imperial Estates warned him again and again about his son. Only once he was convinced that his son was under the influence of the Jesuits and that the possibility of a Catholic area within the Nassau lands was a danger to the Protestant inhabitants, did he get persuaded to make a new will. On 3 July 1621 he drew up a third will, in which he laid down something that he had always considered to be utterly nonsensical, namely to divide the small county of Nassau-Siegen, which was barely able to support one lord, into three parts. It was an act of pure desperation. His three eldest sons, John the Younger, William and John Maurice, were to receive one third each. The administration of the city of Siegen would remain in joint ownership of the three sons.

For John the Younger, therefore, only one third of the county was provided for in the third will. On 6 August 1621, he was informed of this, with a precise statement of the reasons that had led his father to take this step. On 9 May 1623, i.e. not until two years later, John the Younger protested against this with a letter from Frankfurt to the councillors of Siegen. Of course, in the meantime he had not been idle and had not hesitated to denounce his father to the Emperor. At the time of his letter of protest he was certainly already aware of the Poenale mandatum cassatorium, which Emperor Ferdinand II officially issued some time later, on 27 June 1623, informing John the Middle that at the time of making his third will as a fellow combatant of the outlawed Winter King he was not entitled to make a will. He had to revoke it and answer to an imperial court within two months. It seems that John the Younger then shrank from having the imperial decree delivered to his seriously ill father.

=== Death, burial and reburial ===
John the Middle died at Siegen Castle (Note: The other sources that mention a place of death, state that he died in Siegen.) on 27 September 1623. (Note: All but one of the sources that mention a complete date of death, state this date. Only Glawischnig (1974) states the date 7 October 1623. It is not clear whether the author meant to convert the date mentioned by the other sources to the Gregorian calendar, nor whether the date mentioned by the other sources is according to the Julian calendar.) None of the three sons mentioned in the will were present at the death of their father. On 13 October William and John Maurice arrived in Siegen, and on 26 October John the Younger.

John the Middle had planned a dignified burial vault for the dynasty he founded, in the St. Nicholas Church in Siegen. For this, there are remarkable notes in Latin, partly in elegiac couplets, for a projected memorial and burial place of the sovereign family, from the time around 1620, with the names of all 25 children from his two marriages, also with details of birth, marriage and death of his relatives. Since the project was not carried out, the burials of the members of the sovereign family between 1607 and 1658 took place in the inadequate burial vault under the choir of the mentioned parish church. John the Middle was buried on 5/15 November 1623 in the St. Nicholas Church in Siegen. Georgius Remus wrote a Leichenpredigt for him, which was published in Herborn in 1624.

John the Middle was reburied on 29 April 1690 (Note: Lück & Wunderlich (1956), p. 27 however, state the date 26 April 1690.) with his two wives in the Fürstengruft in Siegen.

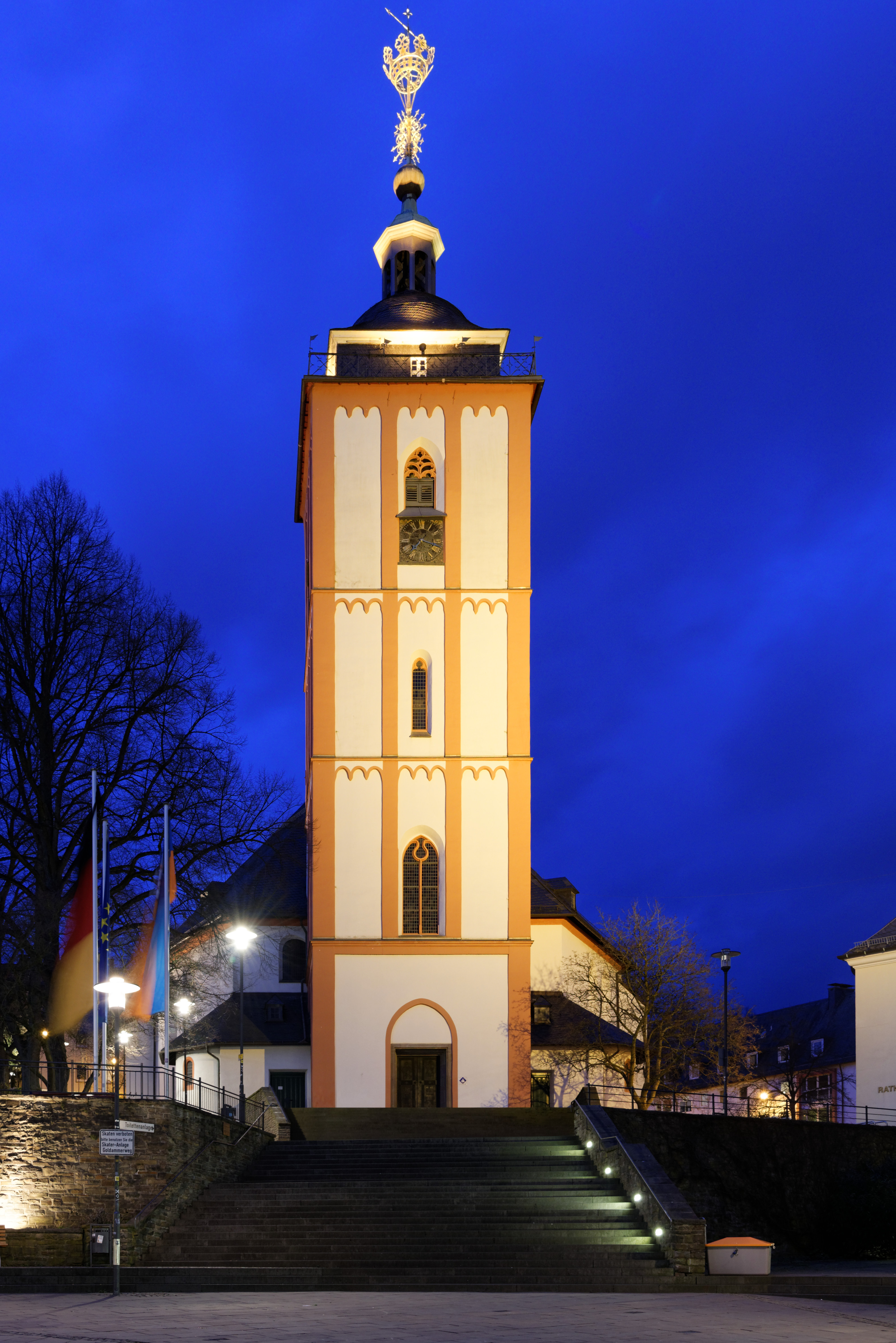
The St. Nicholas Church in Siegen. Photo: Matthias Böhm, 2016.

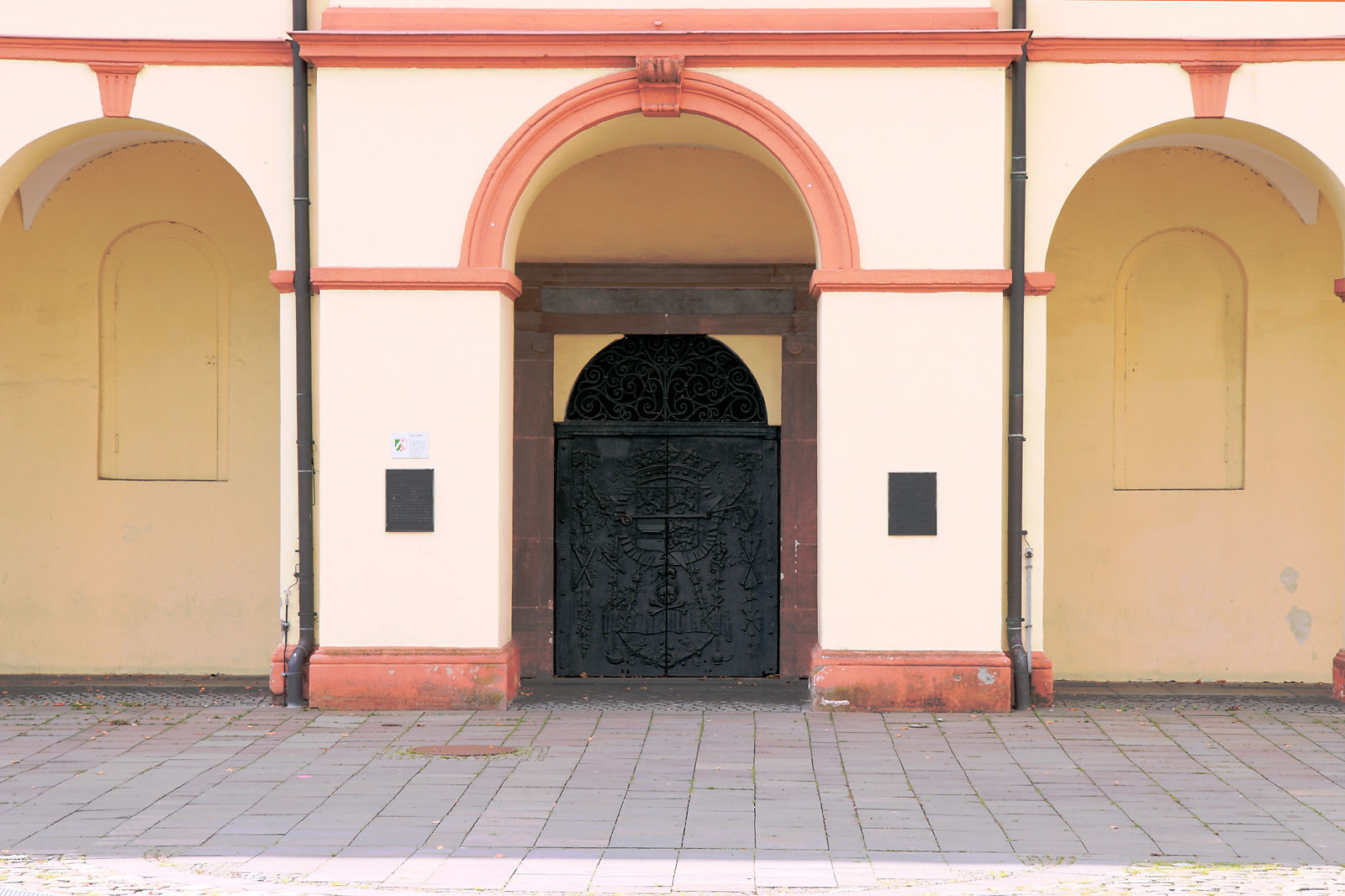
The entrance to the Fürstengruft in Siegen. Photo: Bob Ionescu, 2009.

=== Succession dispute ===
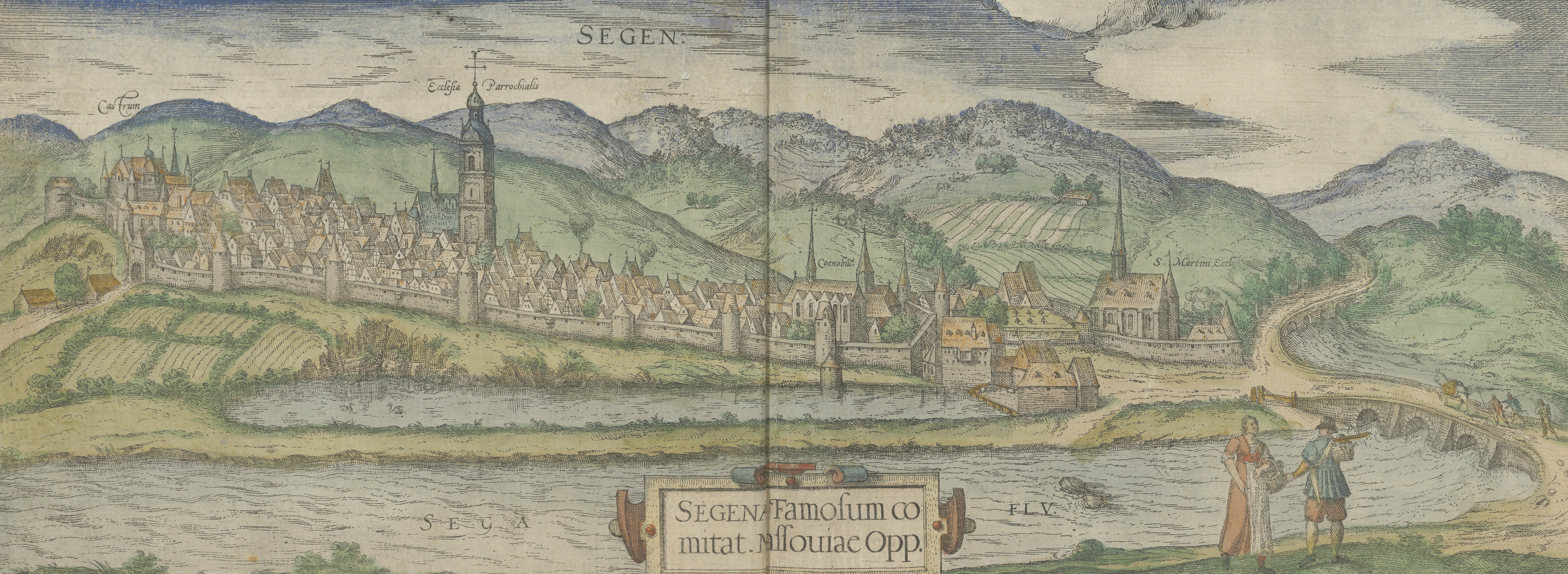
Siegen in 1617. From Braun & Hogenberg, Civitates orbis terrarum Band 6, Cologne, 1617. On the left the city castle.

Everyone knew that there would be a dispute at the reading of the will on 11 December 1623. John the Younger had the imperial decree read out, and when his brothers were not very impressed by it, he said as he stood up: "Der Kaiser wird uns scheiden!" ("The Emperor will part us!"). He had taken the precaution of obtaining a further imperial decree on 20 November 1623 against Countess Dowager Margaret and her sons, in which the Emperor strictly forbade impeding John's assumption of government, his taking possession of the land and his inauguration. On 12 January 1624, John the Younger was able to accept the homage from the city of Siegen, but only because he beforehand had secretly let a squadron of selected horsemen into the town through the castle gate (that is, not through a city gate) in a heavy snowstorm, so that they could not be seen or heard by the town guards.

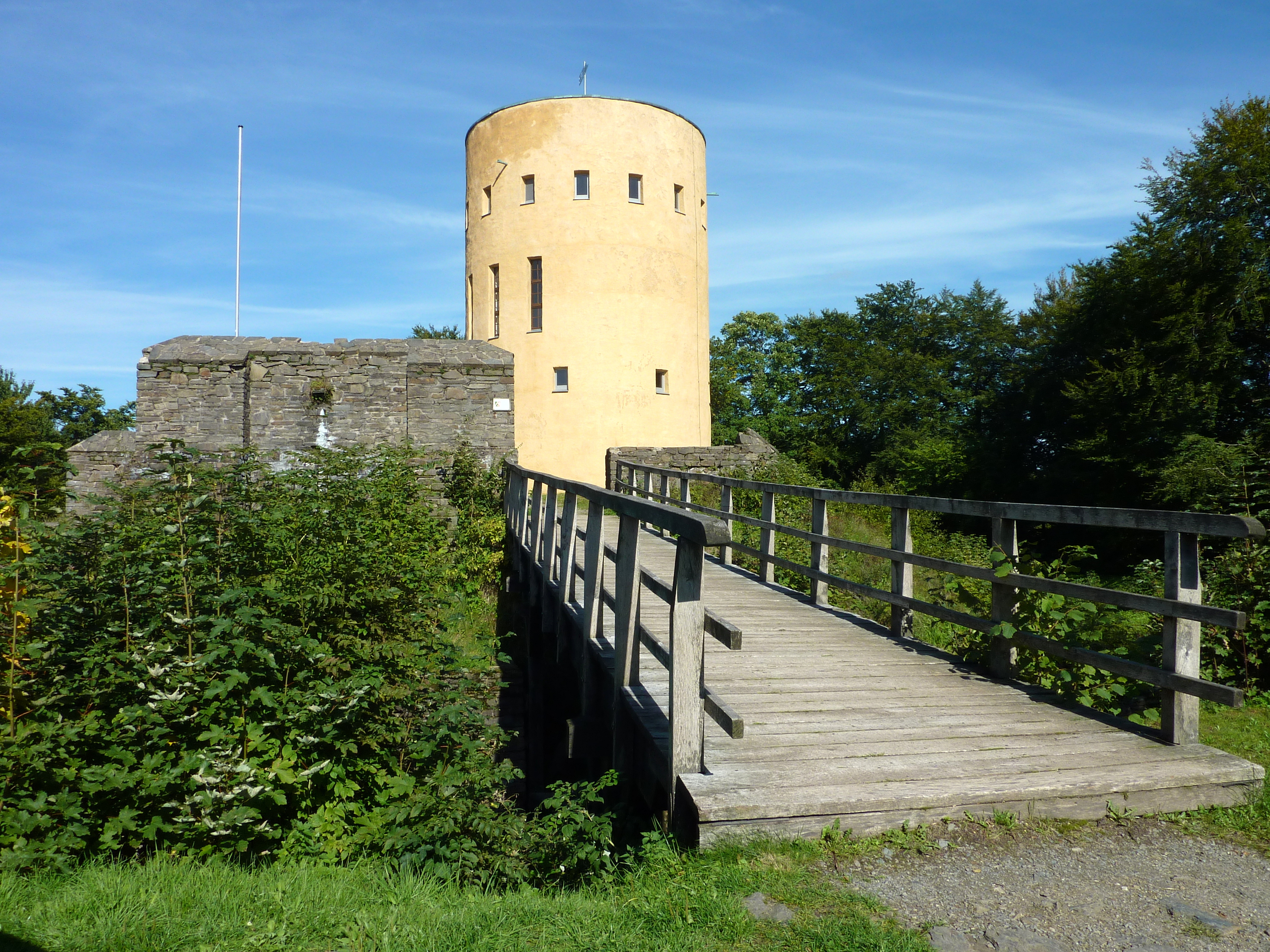
Ginsburg Castle. Photo: Frank Behnsen, 2010.

John the Younger thus received the entire inheritance, and the provisions of the will made in favour of William and John Maurice remained a dead letter. However, on 13/23 January 1624, John the Younger voluntarily ceded the sovereignty over the Hilchenbach district with Ginsburg Castle and some villages belonging to the Ferndorf and Netphen districts, to William. With the exception of John Maurice and George Frederick, the younger brothers accepted only modest appanages. Henceforth, until 1645, the county of Nassau-Siegen had two governments, one in Siegen, the other in Hilchenbach. However, for a short period (1632–1635) this situation underwent a temporary change: during the Thirty Years' War, his brothers, who were fighting on the Protestant side, rebelled against John the Younger.

Count Louis Henry of Nassau-Dillenburg entered the service of King Gustavus II Adolphus of Sweden on 1 December 1631, who had landed in Germany on 24 June 1630 to intervene in favour of the Protestants in the Thirty Years' War. Countess Dowager Margaret, through the mediation of Louis Henry, turned to Gustavus Adolphus and asked for help against the machinations of her stepson John the Younger. Consequently, on 14 February 1632 the Swedish king sent an order from Frankfurt to Louis Henry to provide military support for his first cousin John Maurice. Louis Henry then occupied the city of Siegen with his regiment of Dutch and Swedish soldiers. One day later, on 29 February, John Maurice and his brother Henry arrived in Siegen. Just as John the Younger had kept his cavalry in reserve eight years earlier, now John Maurice and Henry, supported by the presence of the Swedish regiment, negotiated with the citizens, who felt bound by the oath they had sworn to John the Younger. On 4 March, after long and difficult negotiations, the citizens paid homage to John Maurice and Henry. John Maurice obtained for himself not only the Freudenberg district, which his father had intended for him in the will of 1621, but also Netphen, which had been intended for John the Younger in the same will. William was not only confirmed in the possession of Hilchenbach, but also received Ferndorf and Krombach, as stipulated in his father's will. The city of Siegen paid homage only to William and John Maurice, who only in 1635 admitted their elder brother John the Younger back into co-sovereignty. However, the latter soon restored the old order: in 1636, he again became the sole owner of his father's property, with the exception of Hilchenbach, which he left to William, and he again governed the city of Siegen alone. John Maurice was again excluded from the county's sovereignty. However, in 1642 he inherited the territory from his brother William in accordance with his father's will.

John the Younger died in Ronse on 27 July 1638. His only son John Francis Desideratus was born in Nozeroy on 28 July 1627. His mother acted as regent until his marriage in 1651. He made several attempts to obtain the whole Siegerland. In 1646 he visited the Emperor in Vienna to protest against his uncle John Maurice's seizure of the county. On 22 January 1645, after his return from Brazil, the latter, with his brothers George Frederick and Henry and an 80-man entourage, had forcibly occupied Siegen Castle and on 15 February had received the renewed homage from the citizens, albeit this time only for two thirds of the county. In order to end the constant dispute, John Maurice wanted to adhere strictly to his father's will of 1621 and leave his nephew John Francis Desideratus the one third that was due to him. Already before his departure to Brazil, on 25 October 1635, he had explicitly authorised his subjects to recognise the then still living John the Younger as co-ruler. In 1645 John Maurice relinquished his rights to the Freudenberg district, granted by the will of 1621, in favour of his brother George Frederick. John Francis Desideratus was unsuccessful with the Emperor in Vienna, and two years later, at the Congress of Westphalia, Emperor Ferdinand III ratified the fiercely contested 1621 will of John the Middle. This left John Francis Desideratus only the Catholic third part, which is still known today as Johannland. John Maurice held both the other thirds in his hand, because his brother William had already died and left him his third part, and George Frederick had ceded all his rights to John Maurice in 1649. It was therefore the latter who continued to administer the Freudenberg district.

== Explanation of the nickname the Middle ==
In the time that John the Middle lived, it was not yet customary for reigning counts to be numbered, as was the case with kings. When father and son had the same given name and the son came of age, it was necessary to distinguish both. In this case, the father was referred to as Johann der Ältere and the son as Johann der Jüngere. This is similar to the still-used custom that, when father and son bear the same given name and surname, they are distinguished by the addition of the respective abbreviations Sr. (senior) and Jr. (junior) after the surname. That John the Middle was originally called the Younger is shown in the documents found in the 1990s in the Hessisches Hauptstaatsarchiv in Wiesbaden (HHStA 171 D 1161), in which an attempt was made to record, at least from time to time, who was buried where and when in the burial vault in Dillenburg. In these documents John's first wife is mentioned as Graf Johan des Jüngern gemahlin frau Magdalena gebohrne von Waldeck and his son, who died in 1600, as Graf Johans des Jungern söhnlein Friderich Ludwig.
But this Johann der Jüngere also had a son named John. When this son came of age, the distinction was no longer sufficient, since there were now three men from three successive generations with the same given name. The youngest was now referred to as Johann der Jüngere, and the middle one was called Johann der Mittlere. It was not until the nineteenth century that historians started to give the reigning counts a regal number. Johann der Ältere became John VI, Johann der Mittlere became John VII, and Johann der Jüngere became John VIII.

== Marriages and issue ==
=== First marriage ===
John the Middle married firstly at Dillenburg Castle (Note: The other sources that mention a place of marriage, state that they married in Dillenburg.) on 9 December 1581 (Note: All but one of the sources that mention a full date of marriage, state this date. Hoffmeister (1883), p. 27, however, states the date 24 November 1581.) to Countess Magdalene of Waldeck-Wildungen (1558 – Idstein Castle, (Note: The other sources do not mention a place of death.) 9 September 1599), the youngest daughter of Count Philip IV of Waldeck-Wildungen and his third wife Countess Jutta of Isenburg-Grenzau. (Note: Other sources that mention both parents indicate other parents.) Magdalene was the widow of Count Philip Louis I of Hanau-Münzenberg.

From the marriage of John and Magdalene the following children were born:

1. John Ernest (Siegen Castle, 21 October 1582^{Jul.} (Note: "Dek (1962) and Dek (1968) write that he was born at Dillenburg Castle, but Dek (1970) corrects this and gives Siegen as place of birth, which is confirmed by Menk (1971), p. 18. Dek (1962) indicates as date of birth Sunday 21-10-1582, which corresponds with the Julian calendar.") – Udine, 16/17 September 1617^{Jul.} (Note: "Dek (1962) indicates Udine as the place of death. See the file in the Royal House Archive of the Netherlands (4/135), entitled: «Ableben von Johann Ernst, Erbgraf zu Nassau-Siegen den 17 September stil veteri (1617) in Mitternacht zu Udine». The death announcement contained therein, as well as other announcements found in the State Archives Wiesbaden (170^{III} 1617 Sep. Dez.) or in the State Archives Marburg (File 115, Waldeck 2, Nassau 339), were all sent from Udine by the brother of the deceased on 27-9 (i.e. new style), and indicate that the death, after an illness of three or four weeks, occurred, either «heute diese Nacht umb 12 Uhr», or «le 26, environ à minuit». All this information is consistent, and we can be sure that the count died during the siege of Udine, in the night of 16 to 17-9-1617 old style. See also a document concerning his death, on the occasion of his burial on 19-4-1618 in Siegen (Royal House Archive of the Netherlands 3/1072): «27 Septembris, Anno 1617 ohngefehr umb Mitternacht … zu Udina».")), was, among other things, a general in the Venetian army, involved in the Uskok War.
2. Count John VIII the Younger (Dillenburg Castle, 29 September 1583^{Jul.} (Note: "Place of birth mentioned in Dek (1962), Dek (1968), Dek (1970) and in his biography (Royal House Archive of the Netherlands IV, 1638). Dek (1962) says he was born on Sunday 29-9-1583, so old style.") – Ronse Castle near Oudenaarde, 27 July 1638 (Note: "In Genealogisches Handbuch des Adels XXXIII, 51 it is erroneously stated that he died in Roubaix, Flanders. He died in 1638 on his estate in Ronse, near Oudenaarde in East Flanders (see De Clercq (1962), p. 132, which gives many details about his death and burial). Ronse Castle then passed to the Merode Family, and was sold and demolished in 1823 (see De Ligne (1936), p. 26). The date of death mentioned by all authors, 27-7-1638, is the one that appears in the notifications sent from Ronse, where the new calendar was in force. So it is most likely 27-7, new style.")), succeeded his father as Count of Nassau-Siegen in 1623. Married in Brussels on 13 August 1618 to Princess Ernestine Yolande de Ligne (2 November 1594 – Brussels, 4 January 1663).
3. Elisabeth (Dillenburg Castle, 8 November 1584 – Landau, 26 July 1661), married in Wildungen in November 1604 (Note: "Wildungen 19-11-1604 in Dek (1962) (date confirmed in Europäische Stammtafeln I, 117). Wildungen 29-11-1604 (new style?) in von Ehrenkrook, et al. (1928) I, 195 and 409. Europäische Stammtafeln I, 139 on the other hand places the marriage on 18-11-1604, which is the date Hoffmeister (1883) states. However, an original copy of the latter work with handwritten notes by various archivists, which is in the State Archives Marburg, states that the following inscription about Elisabeth is on the baptismal font at Arolsen: «dicta Ao 1604 19 Novemb. et Nuptiae Wildungen celebratae».") to Count Christian of Waldeck-Wildungen (Eisenberg Castle, 24/25 December 1585 – Waldeck Castle, 31 December 1637).
4. Adolf (Dillenburg Castle, 8 August 1586 – Xanten, 7 November 1608), was a captain in the Dutch States Army.
5. Juliane (Dillenburg Castle, 3 September 1587 (Note: "Birthplace in Dek (1962), with the date 3-9 also found in Europäische Stammtafeln I, 98, while Europäische Stammtafeln I, 117 states 8-9. We have chosen the first of these two dates because the Personalia in the funeral sermon (quoted by Knetsch (1931)) says that she was born at Dillenburg Castle on 3 September 1587 «abends zwischen 7 und 8 Uhr».") – Eschwege, 15 February 1643 (Note: "See Dek (1962) and Knetsch (1931). The latter mentions as sources: a) Schminke, Geschichte von Eschwege, 1857, p. 14; b) «Personalia» in the funeral sermon: «abends zwischen 5 und 6 Uhr»; c) Notification of Landgravine Amelia Elisabeth, Kassel 16‑2‑1643; d) Notification of Landgrave Herman of Hesse-Rotenburg (Dresden Archive N. 8658).")), married at Dillenburg Castle on 21 May 1603^{Jul.} (Note: "On 21‑5‑1603, in Europäische Stammtafeln I, 117. On 22‑5‑1603 in Europäische Stammtafeln I, 98 and in Dek (1962) and Dek (1970) (place of marriage: Dillenburg). Knetsch (1931) also indicates Dillenburg 22-5 (according to the Annals of the University of Marburg). According to this author (who refers to the Hessian matrimonial affairs) was it the marriage contract (pactum dotale) that was signed on 21-5; but he adds that the «présent du lendemain» (Morgengabeverschreibung) was signed on the 22nd. This information confirms that the marriage was celebrated religiously on the 21st (and was consummated on the night of the 21st to the 22nd): as we find in the State Archives Wiesbaden (130^{II} 2380^{II} d) a letter of invitation sent from Dillenburg on 11-5-1603 in which the Count of Nassau-Ottweiler was asked to arrive in Dillenburg on the 18th to attend the wedding «zur Vollziehung des ehelichen BEYLAGERS auff Sambstag den 21 hujus alhier». So there is no doubt that the date of the religious ceremony is Saturday 21-5-1603 (thus old style).") (Beilager) and in Kassel on 4 June 1603^{Jul.} (Heimführung) to Landgrave Maurice of Hesse-Kassel (Kassel, 25 May 1572 – Eschwege, 15 March 1632).
6. Anne Mary (Dillenburg Castle, 3 March 1589 – 22 February 1620), married in Dillenburg on 3 February 1611^{Jul.} (Note: "The marriage took place in Dillenburg according to Dek (1962) and Dek (1970), who place the ceremony on 2-6-1611 (2-2 in Europäische Stammtafeln I, 117 and IV, 137). See in the Royal House Archive of the Netherlands (4/134) an invitation «uff Sambstagk den 2 Tagk künftigen Monats Februari … gegen Abend zeitlich einkommen und Sontags der christliche Kirchgang und Hochzeitlich Ehrentagk gehalten werden soll». So there is no doubt about the date 3-2, old style.") to Count John Adolf of Daun-Falkenstein-Broich (c. 1581 – 13 March 1653), Count of Falkenstein and Broich.
7. John Albert (Dillenburg, 8 February 1590 (Note: "Dek (1962) and Dek (1970) say that he was born in Dillenburg on 9-2-1590. The place of birth indeed seems obvious, as the baptism took place in Dillenburg (see Royal House Archive of the Netherlands 3/1047) on 22 February. In fact, the date of birth was not the 9th but the 8th. In the Royal House Archive of the Netherlands (4/1331 II) we find documents concerning the inheritance of the first wife of John the Middle, born Countess of Waldeck: there is mention of the first of the brothers, who died in 1590 «der erste mit Todt abgegangen Anno 1590 … Herrchen Hanns Albrecht … geboren den 8 Februar 1590, auch in demselben Jahr wieder mit Todt abgangen». In the same file there is a correspondence between John the Middle and his daughter Elisabeth. In the letter of 25-2-1619 the count mentions John Albert, his son, who was born in 1590 and died in the same year.") – Dillenburg, 1590).
8. Count William (Dillenburg, 13 August 1592 (Note: "Europäische Stammtafeln says he was born on 12-8-1592, a date confirmed by Dek (1970), with mention of the place of birth. But a notification from the father sent from Siegen of 24 August 1592 (see State Archives Wiesbaden 170^{III}, Korrespondenzen) indicates the date «13 hujus».") – Orsoy, 7/17 July 1642 (Note: "See Menk (1967), p. 57. The author establishes that the death took place in Orsoy (Lower Rhine) on Thursday 7/17 July 1642, between one and two o'clock in the afternoon, and bases himself on the documents found in the Royal House Archive of the Netherlands (IV, 1444): a notification addressed to the widow from Orsoy on 7/17 July 1642 («heute den 7/17 disses …») and a death announcement from a priest from Kampen («Donnerstag, den 7/17 juli 1642 zwischen 1 u. 2 Uhr nachmittags zu Orsoy …»).")), was since 1624 count in a part of Nassau-Siegen and since 1633 field marshal of the Dutch States army. Married at Siegen Castle on 17 January 1619 (Note: "The marriage is said to have taken place on 20-8-1616, according to Europäische Stammtafeln. Dek (1970) is closer to the truth when he puts forward the date of 16-1-1619 (without place). It is in fact on 17-1-1619 that the ceremony on the occasion of the baptism of John Ernest was celebrated, which had taken place on 10-1, old style, in Siegen (see State Archives Wiesbaden 170^{III}: Count Ernst Casimir of Nassau-Diez answers to his brother John the Middle of Nassau-Siegen about the marriage that followed the recent baptism in Siegen «auf nächstabgewichener Kindstauf zu Siegen mit dem Fraulein zu Erbach sein hochzeitliches Beilager gehalten»). See also Royal House Archive of the Netherlands (4/1591 II): John the Middle writes on 2‑1‑1619 in Siegen to his daughter Juliane with the request to arrive on the evening of the 16th to attend William's wedding on the 17th. On 3-1-1619, William personally requests the Landgrave of Hesse-Kassel to arrive on the 16th in the evening to attend his wedding that would take place «den 17 dieses allhier». It is the marriage contract that was signed on the 16th, in Siegen.") to Countess Christiane of Erbach (5 June 1596 – Culemborg, 6 July 1646 (Note: "See Dek (1962). On the other hand, her daughter Mary Magdalene reports from Culemborg on 9-7-1646 that the death took place «auf den 1 huius des Vormittags um zehn Uhr».")).
9. Anne Joanne (Note: The given name Anne in Huberty, et al. (1981), p. 234. The given name Anna in Romein (1937), pp. 125–126, Van der Aa (1855), p. 1267 and Textor von Haiger (1617), p. 172.) (Dillenburg Castle, 2 March 1594^{Jul.} (Note: "She was baptised in Siegen on Sunday 17-3-1594 (see State Archives Wiesbaden 170^{III}), letter from Count Wolfgang Ernst I of Ysenburg-Büdingen. Another notification preserved in the archives of the princes of Isenburg-Büdingen-Birstein at Büdingen Castle clearly shows that the date 23-2-1594, indicated by Dek (1962) and all printed genealogies, is incorrect. The letter, dated Dillenburg 3 März 1594, states that Anne was born «verschiedenen Tag … und Sonntag Judicae den 17ten Marty … getauft». The reference to Sunday 17 March clearly indicates that the writer of the letter used the old style and that, when he speaks of a birth that took place the day before, this can only be a birth that took place on 2 March, old style. The mistake may be due to the fact that in Holland (where the countess later lived) the new style was in use. Probably, it was believed that her date of birth was calculated according to the new calendar and German authors converted it to the old calendar, which is indeed the incorrect date of 23 February.") – The Hague, December 1636 (Note: "The place of death in Dek (1970), with the date 7-12-1636 (as in Europäische Stammtafeln). However, a serious reservation must be made with this information, since the bell in the Great Church or St. James' Church in The Hague was not rung for her until 23 December 1636. See the register of fees received for opening graves or ringing the bell (church registers inv. n2. 68, f. 16v.). This information was obtained from the Municipal Archives in The Hague, according to whom no actual death certificates existed at the time.")), married at Broich Castle near Mülheim an der Ruhr on 19 June 1619 (Note: "According to Dek (1970) and Europäische Stammtafeln, the marriage took place on 14-6, but in the State Archives Wiesbaden 170^{III} we find a letter from Jakob Schickhard, addressed to John the Middle, Count of Nassau-Siegen, which recounts in full detail the ceremony celebrated in Broich on 19-6 and then the couple's departure for Vianen. This letter is dated Siegen 30 June 1619. See also Royal House Archive of the Netherlands IV/1345. The contract was signed in Siegen on 18-3-1619 (Royal House Archive of the Netherlands 4/1346 I).") to Johan Wolfert van Brederode (Heusden (?), 12 June 1599 – Petersheim Castle near Maastricht, 3 September 1655), Lord of Brederode, Vianen, Ameide and Cloetingen.
10. Frederick Louis (2 February 1595 – Dillenburg, 22 April 1600^{Jul.} (Note: "See State Archives Wiesbaden (170^{III}). John the Middle writes on 23-4-1600 from Dillenburg to his son Adolf to inform him of the death of his younger brother, Frederick Louis «den 22. dieses, am Abend ungefähr um acht Uhr». He announces the funeral for the next day, Thursday, which proves that the date of death is calculated according to the old style.")).
11. Magdalene (23 February 1596 – 6 December 1662 (Note: "The date of death given by Europäische Stammtafeln seems very plausible. On the other hand, we cannot accept the indication by Dek (1970) that the countess died in Bremen on 31-7-1661. We found a copy of the will with codicil in the State Archives Marburg (115, Waldeck 2, Nassau 343). The countess testified in Verden on 4-4-1658 and on 29-11-1662. There is therefore every reason to assume that she died in that town.")), married:
  1. in August 1631 to Bernhard Moritz Freiherr von Oeynhausen-Velmede (1602 – Leipzig, 20 November 1632);
  2. on 25 August 1642 Philipp Wilhelm Freiherr von Innhausen und Knyphausen (20 March 1591 – Bremen, 5 May 1652).
12. John Frederick (10 February 1597 (Note: "See Textor von Haiger (1617). The author writes that John Frederick was born on 10-2, between eleven and twelve o'clock in the evening.") – 1597 (Note: "See Textor von Haiger (1617): «ist von dieser Welt im selbigen Jahr wiederumb abgeschieden und in die Pfarrkirche zu Dillenburg begraben». So there is every reason to assume that birth and death took place in Dillenburg, which was also the family's residence at that time. Dek (1970) situates the death in 1598.")).
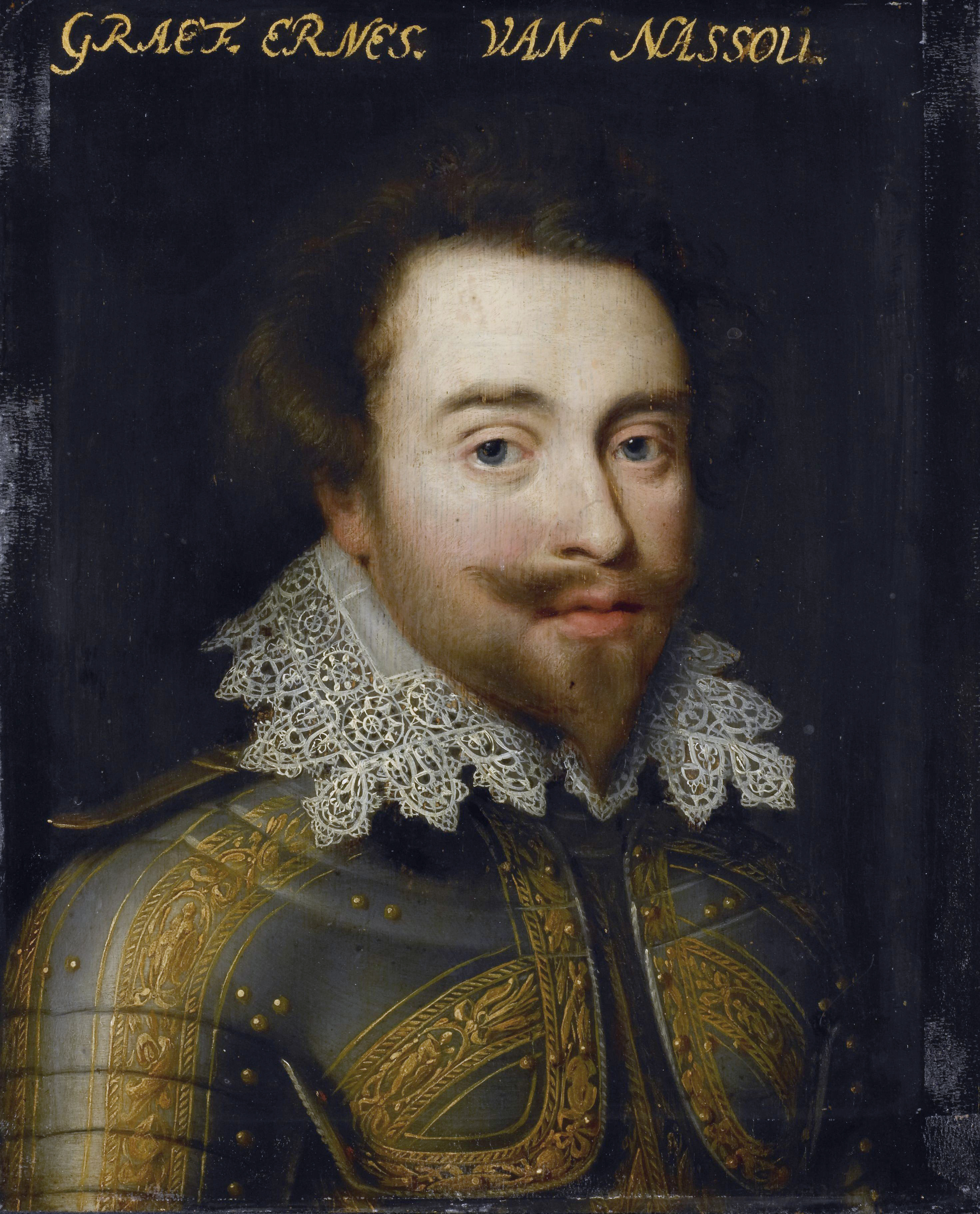
John Ernest of Nassau-Siegen (1582–1617). Studio of Jan Antonisz. van Ravesteyn, c. 1609–1633. Rijksmuseum Amsterdam.

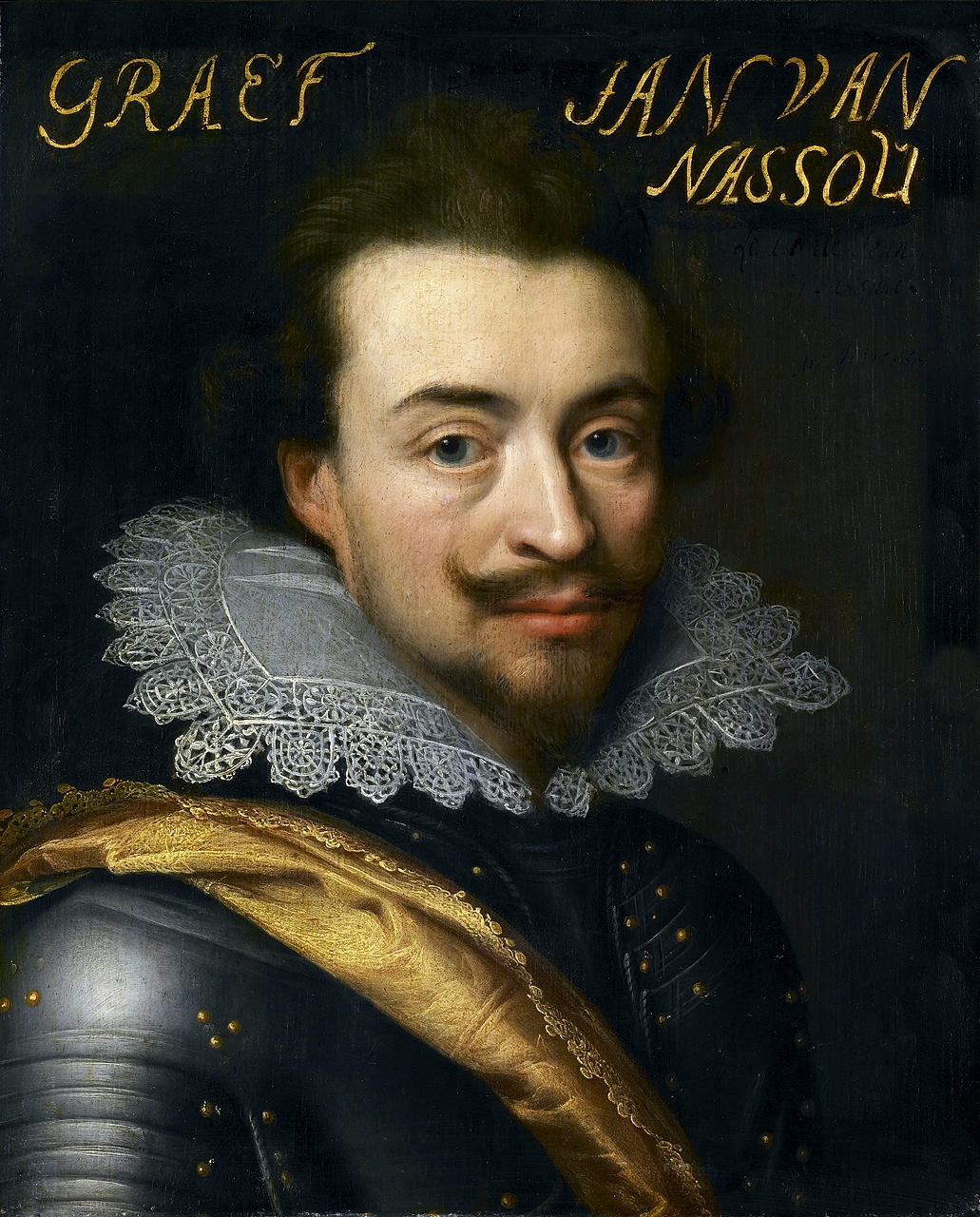
Count John VIII the Younger of Nassau-Siegen (1583–1638). Studio of Jan Antonisz. van Ravesteyn, c. 1614–1633. Rijksmuseum Amsterdam.

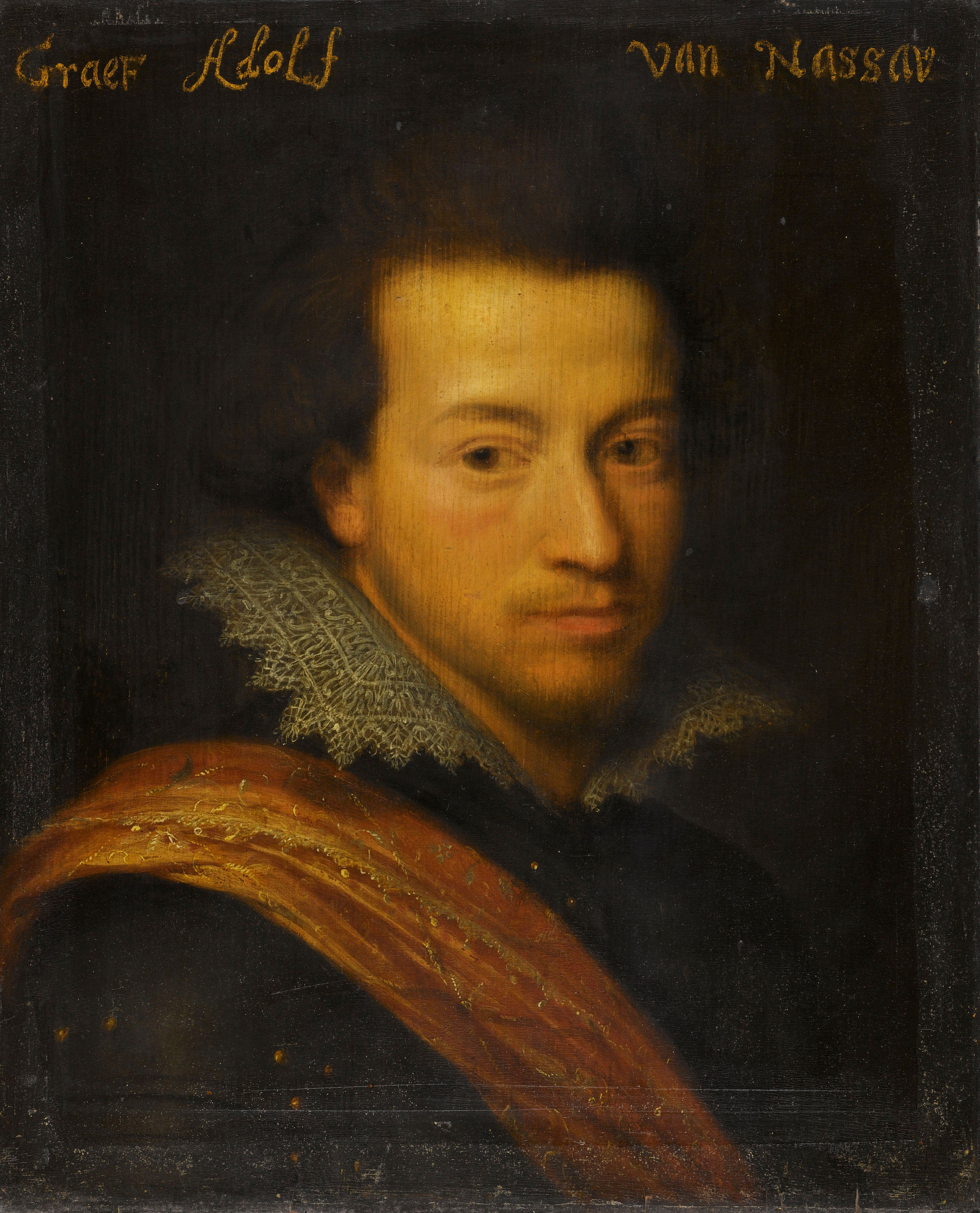
Adolf of Nassau-Siegen (1586–1608). Attributed to Jan Antonisz. van Ravesteyn, c. 1609–1633. Rijksmuseum Amsterdam.

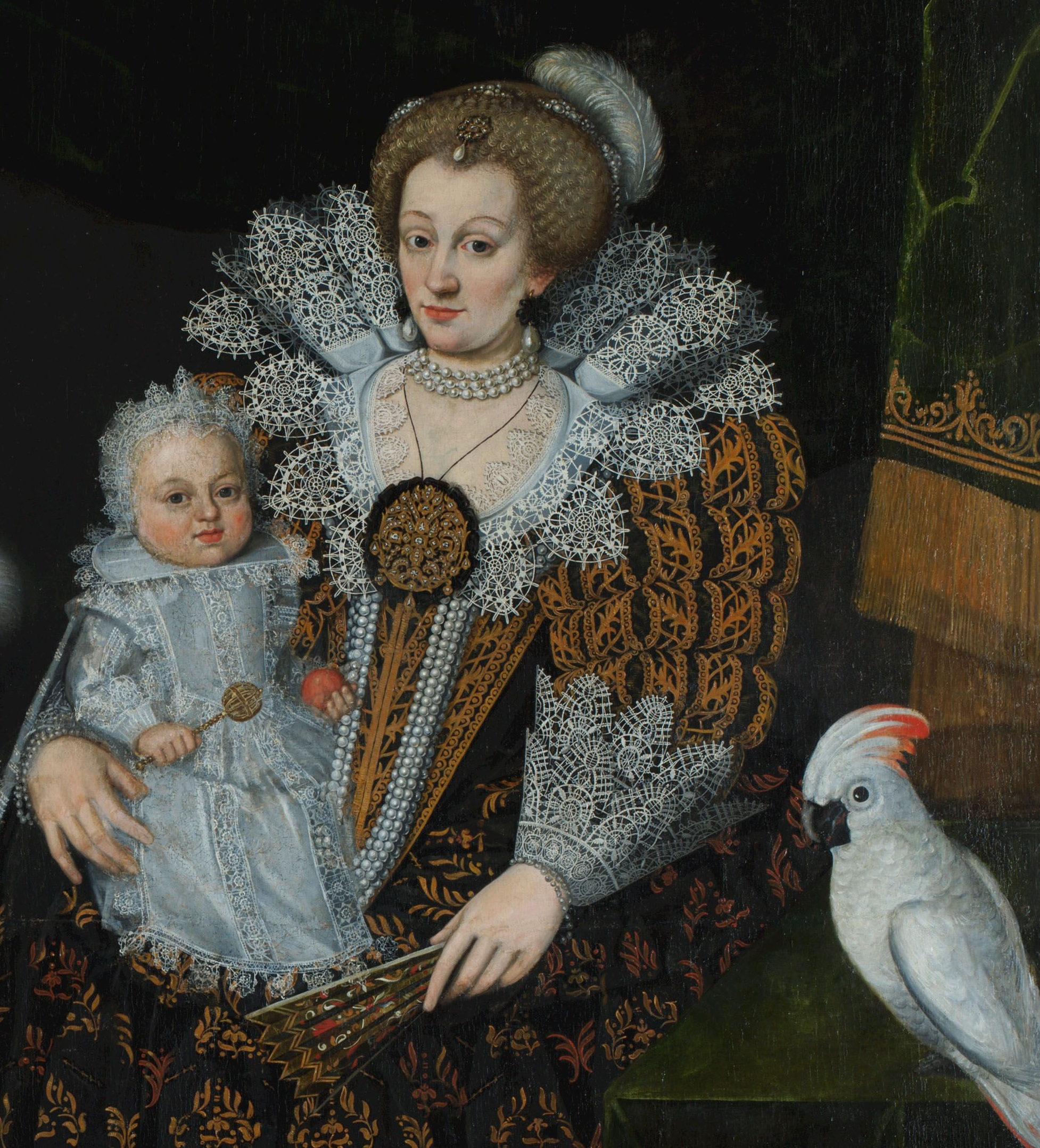
Juliane of Nassau-Siegen (1587–1643). Detail of a painting by August Erich, 1618–1628. Gemäldegalerie Alte Meister, Museumslandschaft Hessen Kassel.

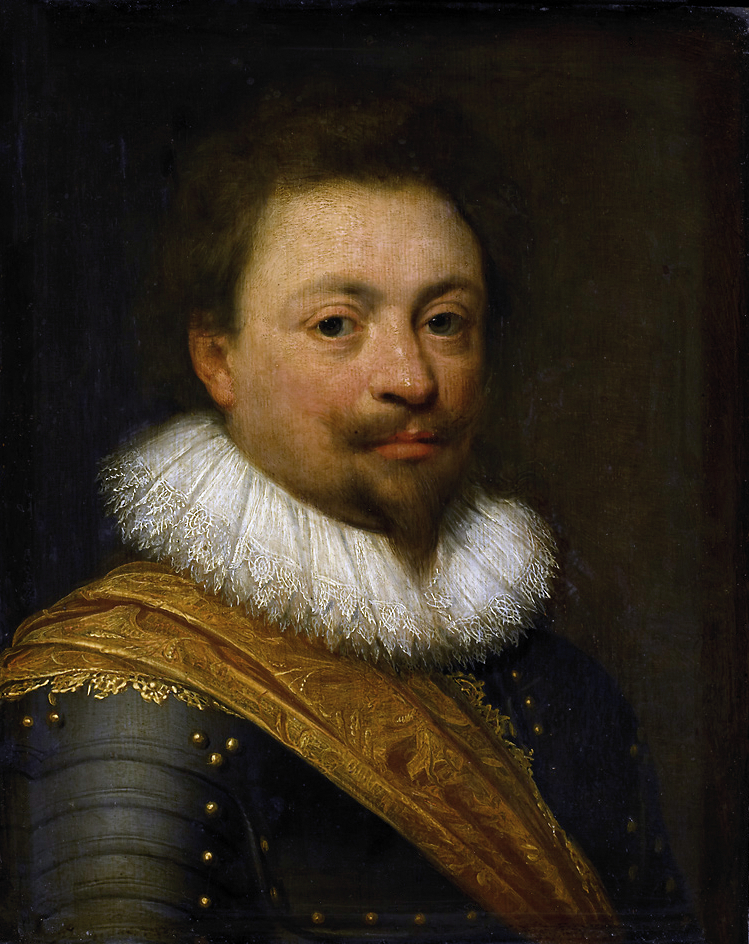
Count William of Nassau-Siegen (1592–1642). Studio of Jan Antonisz. van Ravesteyn, c. 1620–1630. Rijksmuseum Amsterdam.

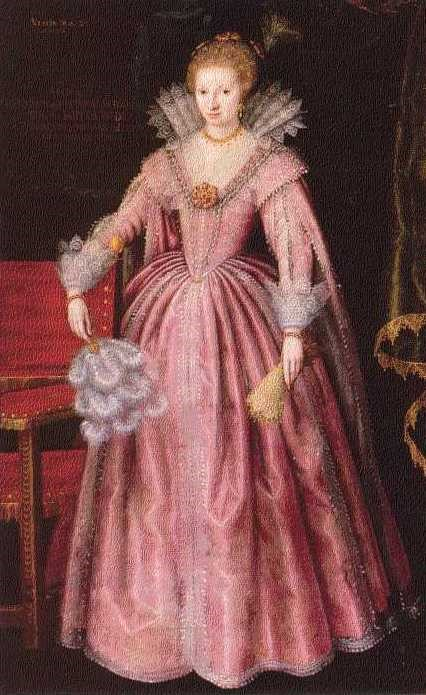
Anne Joanne of Nassau-Siegen (1594–1636). Anonymous portrait, 1620. Braunfels Castle.

=== Second marriage ===
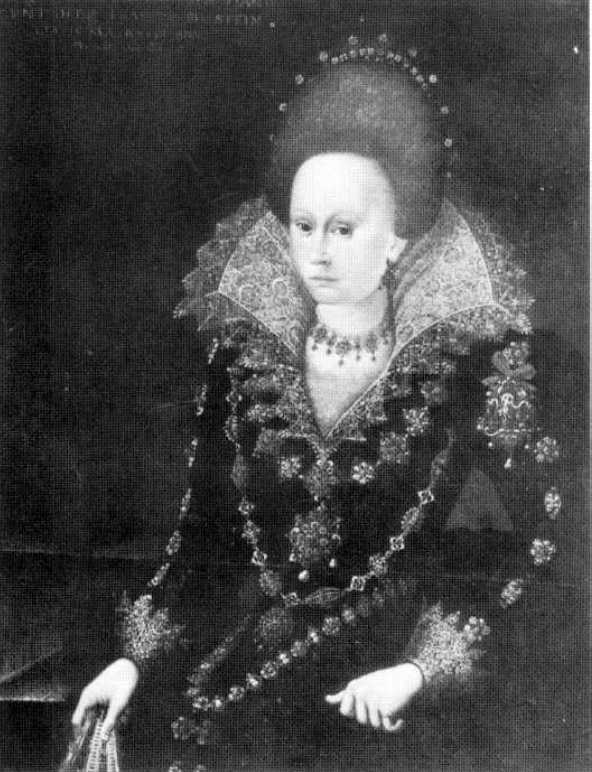
Duchess Margaret of Schleswig-Holstein-Sonderburg. Anonymous portrait, 1611. Siegerlandmuseum, Siegen.

John the Middle remarried at Rotenburg Castle (Note: Glawischnig (1974) states married in Rotenburg/Fulda. Textor von Haiger (1617), p. 153 states married in Rotenburg in Hessen and specifies that this was the Beilager and that the Heimführung took place on 3 September 1603 in Dillenburg.) on 27 August 1603 (Note: All but one of the sources that mention a full marriage date, state this date. Only Glawischnig (1974) states the date 6 September 1603. It is not clear whether the author intended to convert the date mentioned by the other sources to the Gregorian calendar, or whether the date mentioned by the other sources is according to the Julian calendar.) to Duchess Margaret of Schleswig-Holstein-Sonderburg (Haus Sandberg am Alsensund near Sonderburg, 24 February 1583 – Nassauischer Hof, Siegen, 10/20 April 1658 (Note: The other sources that mention the place and date of death, state that she died in Siegen on 10 April 1658.)), the youngest daughter of Duke John II the Younger of Schleswig-Holstein-Sonderburg and his first wife Duchess Elisabeth of Brunswick-Grubenhagen.

From the marriage of John and Margaret the following children were born:

1. Fürst John Maurice (Dillenburg Castle, 18 June 1604 (Note: "All authors indicate 17-6-1604 as the date of birth of John Maurice (including Dek (1962), where the place is indicated). Personally, we agree with the conclusions of the recent study published in Menk (1979), in which the author practically proves that the real date is 18 June. The 17th is only mentioned by the chronicler Textor von Haiger, who wrote in 1617: «Johann Moritz ist geboren den 17 Junii, zwischen 9 und 10 uhren des nachts im Jahr 1604, auf dem Schloß Dillenburg». Another unknown chronicler, whose work from after 1652 has been preserved in the Royal House Archive of the Netherlands (4 Nr. 1486a), repeats the same information, while a more recent biographer, Driesen, states that in at least one case the prince himself declared that he was born on the 17th. However, this is not conclusive proof, as there are many examples of royal persons from the 17th and 18th centuries who did not know the exact date of their birth. It should also be noted that, according to Menk (1979), a secretary of the prince had started a new biography of his master. However, the manuscript leaves the date of birth blank, which proves that there must have been some uncertainty about it. An unknown hand has added in the margin that the prince was born on … 14 June! This is difficult to imagine, because although no birth notification for John Maurice has been found (his baptismal certificate does not appear in the registers in Dillenburg, which started in 1572), we know from a congratulatory letter preserved in the State Archives Wiesbaden (170^{III}) that the notifications were sent on the 19th. Furthermore, Menk (1979) quotes two letters that are original documents, which are difficult to refute: 1) a letter from the prince's sister Elisabeth, sent on 8 July, mentioning the birth on 18 June; 2) a letter from the maternal grandmother of the young prince, who replied from Sonderburg on 16-7-1604 that she had been delighted to hear of the birth of her grandson «verschienen 18 Junii abents umb 10 Uhr». This is a reaction to the official announcement of the birth. Finally, the author formulates two more judicious considerations that help make his thesis more credible. First, it was customary for ancient chroniclers to emphasise that a birth took place on a Sunday. Textor von Haiger does not fail to point this out for the brothers of John Maurice (John Ernest, John the Younger and George Frederick). However, he says nothing about John Maurice, although 17 June 1604 (according to the old calendar, which only could be mentioned here) also was on a Sunday, which is another reason to think that he made a mistake. Furthermore, the accounts of the treasury of the child's grandfather, who also resided at Dillenburg Castle, show that on 19 June the pleased grandfather granted the sum of 1 ducat, 2 guilders and 9 albus to the midwife who came to inform him of the successful delivery of his daughter-in-law. How could anyone wait more than a day to wander through the corridors of the castle to inform the grandfather of the birth of his grandson? So it seemed wise to think outside the box once more and follow Menk (1979) in his conclusions.") – Berg und Tal near Cleves, 10/20 December 1679 (Note: "This is a place that is now part of the town of Kleve and where the prince had a modest residence that he called his «Hüttchen» (see Lück & Wunderlich (1956)). Dek (1962) speaks of the «kasteel» of Kleve. See Royal House Archive of the Netherlands (IV/1491), «Protokoll wegen Uberführung der Leiche … von Kleve nach Siegen», Siegen 2/12‑2‑1680. See also State Archives Wiesbaden (170^{III}), notification dated Siegen 13/23‑12‑1679: «am nechtsverwichenen Mittwochen den 10/20 dieses, morgens umb 9 Uhren».")), was among others governor-captain-admiral-general of Dutch Brazil 1636–1644, stadtholder of Cleves, Mark, Ravensberg and Minden since 1647, Grand Master of the Order of Saint John since 1652 and First Field Marshal of the Dutch States Army 1668–1674. Became count in two-thirds of the County of Nassau-Siegen in 1645 and was elevated to Reichsfürst in 1652.
2. George Frederick Louis (Dillenburg Castle, 23 February 1606 – Bergen op Zoom, 2 October 1674 (Note: "Europäische Stammtafeln wrongly states that he died in June 1674. For his death, see: a. official death notification in Bergen op Zoom on 2-10-1674 in State Archives Wiesbaden (130^{II}, 2200); b. official notification dated Bergen op Zoom 2‑10‑1674 in State Archives Wiesbaden (130^{II}, 2380^{III} c): «Ableben … diessen Morgen zwischen 3 u. 4 Uhren»; c. death register of the city of Bergen op Zoom for the year 1674: «1674 october 2. den governeur Graef Frits».")), was among others commander of Rheinberg and governor of Bergen op Zoom. In 1664 he was elevated to the rank and title of prince. Married in The Hague (Note: Huberty, et al. (1981), p. 234 and Dek (1968), p. 249 do not mention the place of marriage. Dek (1968), p. 245 puts the place of marriage between brackets with a question mark. The marriage is mentioned in the marriage register of the Kloosterkerk in The Hague, see: Frederick of Nassau-Siegen and Eleonora Mauritia of Portugal (church marriage).jpg.) on 4 June 1647 to Mauritia Eleonora of Portugal (Note: The given name Mauritia Eleonora in Menk (2004), p. 192, Huberty, et al. (1981), pp. 234–235, Dek (1970), p. 89, Dek (1968), p. 249, Blok (1911), p. 926 and Vorsterman van Oyen (1882), p. 119. The given name Eleonora Mauritia in Van Ditzhuyzen (2004), p. 87 and Dek (1968), p. 245. The given name Mauritia in Lück (1981), p. 100 and Poelhekke (1979), p. 547. The full name Eleonora Mauritia of Crato instead of Princess of Portugal, with the byname Mauke in Kooijmans (2000), p. 66.) (baptised Delft, 10 May 1609 – Bergen op Zoom, 15 June 1674 (Note: "Europäische Stammtafeln situates her death in 1679. Dek (1962) does not know the place of death, but Dek (1970) says «gest. Bergen op Zoom 16 juni 1674» (in contrast to 25 June in Dek (1962)). See for this death: a. the death registers of the city of Bergen op Zoom: «1674. Junius 16 de heer Governeur vrau». This is probably the date of the funeral, because: b. notification sent by the husband from Bergen op Zoom 15 June 1674 in State Archives Wiesbaden (130^{II}, 2201): «Eleonora Mauritia, Fürstin zu Nassau-Siegen, geb. Prinzessin von Portugal, heute, zwischen 3 u. 4 Uhren nachmittags»; c. two other death announcements, identical to the previous one, in State Archives Wiesbaden (130^{II}, 2380^{III} e).")).
3. William Otto (Dillenburg Castle, 23 June 1607 – near Wolfenbüttel, 14 August 1641 (Note: "See Dek (1962); State Archives Wiesbaden (170^{III}): notification addressed to Count Christian from the army camp at Wolfenbüttel 15‑8‑1641: «gestrigen Tages uff einer partey einen tödlichen Schuss bekommen, und hernach alsobalden diese Welt gesegnet».")), was an officer in the Swedish army.
4. Louise Christine (Siegen Castle, 8 October 1608 – Château-Vilain near Sirod (Jura), 29 December 1678^{Greg.} (Note: "See the death register of the parish of Sirod (Jura), which included Château-Vilain, the residence of the de Watteville family: «1685 Nobilis L.C. de Nassau, Marchionissa de Conflan, Annorum octoginta et amplius animam deo reddidit die vigesima nona decembris, cuius corpus in templo sepultum est». We are almost certain that the death took place in Château-Vilain.")), married in Nozeroy on 4 July 1627 to Philippe François de Joux dit de Watteville (c. 1605 – Bletterans, 1636), Marquis de Conflans, Comte de Bussolin.
5. Sophie Margaret (Siegen Castle, 16 April 1610 – Wisch Castle, Terborg, 8/18 May 1665 (Note: "Mary Magdalene, Countess of Nassau-Siegen, announced the death of Sophie Margaret. The letter is dated Haus Wisch, zu Terborg 11/21‑5‑1665: «morte le 8 de ce mois, entre 10 et 11 heures du soir». The death date 28-5, given by Europäische Stammtafeln, is therefore incorrect. Another notification is also sent from Cleves on 20 May 1665: «den 18 um 11 Uhr mitternachts zu der Borg (Terborg)». See State Archives Wiesbaden (170^{III}).")), married at Wisch Castle in Terborg on 13 January 1656 (Note: "The date 1636 mentioned by Europäische Stammtafeln I, 117 and IV, 39 is impossible: the first wife of the Count of Limburg-Stirum did not die until 1649, according to Geschiedenis der Graven van Limburg-Stirum volume III, 1, 9. According to the same work, the marriage took place in Terborg on 13-1-1656. See the marriage register of the reformed parish of Terborg (municipal archives Wisch), p. 16b, year 1656: «proclamert 6 Januar, kopuliert 13 Januar».") to George Ernest of Limburg-Stirum (Botmurde, 29 August 1593 – September 1661), Count of Bronckhorst, Lord of Wisch, Lichtenvoorde and Wildenborch.
6. Henry (Siegen Castle, 9 August 1611 (Note: "From Siegen, on 9-8-1611, John the Middle announced the birth of a son «heute zwischen vier und fünf Uhren vormittags». See State Archives Marburg (115, Waldeck 2, Nassau 337). See also a letter from John the Middle dated Siegen 16‑8‑1611: «den 9. dieses» (State Archives Wiesbaden 170^{III}, Korrespondenzen) and, under the same number: «Ordnung für den Ablaufder Kindtaufe auf dem Schloss (zu Siegen) Heinrich Gf. zu Nassau» (born in Siegen 9‑8‑1611, baptised Siegen, 29 Sept. 1611), Siegen, 29‑9‑1611.") – Hulst, 27 October/7 November 1652 (Note: "The genealogists usually say that he died on 27-10-1652. However, there is a notification in the State Archives Marburg (115, Waldeck 2, Nassau 339) dated 7 November 1652. From Hulst, Mary Magdalene, Countess of Nassau-Siegen, reports the death of her husband, which took place «heute morgen umb 4 Uhren».")), was among others colonel in the Dutch States Army, governor of Hulst and envoy on behalf of the States-General of the Netherlands. Married at Wisch Castle in Terborg on 19/29 April 1646 (Note: "On 9‑3‑1646 in Europäische Stammtafeln I, 117 en IV, 39. On 19‑4‑1646 in Geschiedenis der Graven van Limburg Stirum volume III, 1, 9 with indication of the place «Terborg». On 29‑4‑1646 in the Genealogisches Handbuch des Adels XXXIII, 51. 9‑3‑1646 is the date of the signing of the marriage contract (see Menk (1967), p. 2). Although a notification was sent to the princes of Holstein inviting them to the ceremony on 15/25 April, must be admitted that it was postponed to 19/29 April (see the marriage registers of Terborg, and Menk (1967), p. 2). The archives of the princes of Wittgenstein in Laasphe (F., 320^{III}) also contain a draft of a congratulatory letter to Count Henry of Nassau-Siegen on the occasion of his marriage on 19/29 April, announced on 16/26 March.") to Countess Mary Magdalene of Limburg-Stirum (Note: "Europäische Stammtafeln calls her Maria Elisabeth. On the other hand, we found Maria Magdalena in the Geschiedenis van de Graven van Limburg-Stirum volume III, 1, 9, which is confirmed by the death notification: «Maria Magdalena».") (1632 (Note: "Geschiedenis der Graven van Limburg Stirum sets the birth around 1632.") – Nassauischer Hof, Siegen, 27 December 1707 (Note: "See the parish registers of Siegen. Burial on the 29th in the royal crypt. A notification dated Siegen 27 December 1707 (State Archives Wiesbaden 130^{II}, 2380^{III} c) states that she died «heute Nachmittag zwischen 1 u. 2 Uhren». An identical notification is kept in the State Archives Marburg (4f. Nassau-Siegen, Nr. 241).")).
7. Mary Juliane (Siegen Castle, 14 August 1612 (Note: "See Dek (1962). In the Royal House Archive of the Netherlands (4/1318^{a}) we find an account of the life of John the Middle, in which it is said that Mary Juliane was born on 14 August 1612, between eleven o'clock and midnight, but without mentioning the place.") – Neuhaus an der Elbe, 21 January 1665^{Jul.} (Note: "See State Archives Dresden, Geheimes Archiv Kursachsen, 69 Lauenburgische Sachen: notification concerning Neuhaus a.d. Elbe, 1655, 22.1/1.2: «am 21. dieses morgens um 9 Uhr». It is therefore certain that the princess died in this city, where she was buried in the crypt of the church. In any case, the date of death by Europäische Stammtafeln (16-1-1655), appears to be incorrect.")), married in Treptow on 13 December 1637 (Note: "See notification (in Royal House Archive of the Netherlands 4/1350): Lübeck, 17 July 1638: «zu Treptow … in ein christliches Ehegelöbnis eingelassen und also den 13 Dezember 1637 unser Beylager … vollzogen».") to Duke Francis Henry of Saxe-Lauenburg (9 April 1604 – 26 November 1658).
8. Amalie (Siegen Castle, 2 September 1613 (Note: "According to Hæutle (1870), the grave inscription says that she was born on 12-9-1615 in Siegen, while Dek (1962) mentions Siegen, 2-9-1613 (as does Europäische Stammtafeln). It seems that this last date must be adhered to, although the indications we have about this birth differ. The paternal grandmother, widow of John the Elder, writes: «vor einer halben Stunde diese Nacht zwischen 12 u. 1 Uhr», and, no doubt because she writes at about 1 a.m., she dates her letter to 1 September (see State Archives Wiesbaden 170^{III}). The father dates his letter to 2 September 1613 (Siegen), but he places the time of delivery differently: «diese Nacht zwischen 11 und 12 Uhren», which would mean that the birth took place on the first at night (State Archives Wiesbaden 170^{III}). However, in the Lebensbeschreibung of John the Middle (Royal House Archive of the Netherlands (4/1318^{a}), is the official date of birth, given for Amalia, 2 September 1613, at night, between one and two o'clock. This is the date we have chosen.") – Sulzbach, 24 August 1669^{Greg.} (Note: "See Rigsarkivet Kobenhaven, Tyske, Kancelli II, Pfalz Sulzbach A I. 15 August 1669, Sulzbach, death notification: «gestern als den 14ten dieses, abends zwischen 6 u. 7 Uhren». Hæutle (1870) says: died in Sulzbach on 24-8-1669, mentioning that this is the new style, and he quotes the epitaph on the tomb.")), married:
  1. in Alt-Stettin on 23 April 1636 (Note: "Europäische Stammtafeln mentions 20‑4‑1636. Dek (1962), based on the marriage contract, dates the marriage in Stettin on 28-4-1636. Elgenstierna (1936): 18‑4‑1636. However, we have chosen the date 23-4 because of a notification that the groom himself sent to his mother-in-law, the widow of John the Middle: from Stralsund he reports on 7 July 1636 the marriage «jüngsthin den 23 Aprilis … zur christlichen copulation auff der Fürstl. Residentz zu A(lten) Stettin». See also Menk (1971), p. 27.") to Herman Wrangel af Salmis (Note: "Hæutle (1870) calls him Count von Wrangel. This is a mistake. See Taschenbuch der uradeligen Häuser (1924), pp. 812–813. It was his son who became count in Sweden in 1651. In the notification of her husband's death, Amalie calls herself «veuve d'Hermann Wrangel af Salmis».") (in Livonia, 29 June 1587 – Riga, 11 December 1643);
  2. in Stockholm on 27 March 1649 (Note: "Married in Stockholm, 3‑4‑1649, in Hæutle (1870) and Dek (1962); on 4‑4‑1649, according to Elgenstierna (1936). But Behr (1854), p. 194, says that according to the notification the marriage took place on 27-3-1649. Europäische Stammtafeln gives this date in his first volume, both in table 35 (Pfalzgrafen von Sulzbach) and in table 117 (Nassau-Siegen).") to Count Palatine Christian Augustus of Sulzbach (Sulzbach, 26 July 1622 – Sulzbach, 23 April 1708).
9. Bernhard (Siegen Castle, 18 November 1614 – Siegen Castle, 6 January 1617^{Jul.} (Note: "Dek (1970) says that he died on 13-1-1617 in Siegen (see also Europäische Stammtafeln). But the official death notification (State Archives Wiesbaden 170^{III}) is dated Siegen 6‑1‑1617 and says deceased «diesen Morgen, Montags, zwischen 6 u. 7 Uhr», which also confirms that it is the old style.")).
10. Christian (Siegen Castle, 16 July 1616 – near Düren, 1/11 April 1644 (Note: "Dek (1962) says he was killed in action in the battle at Neuss on 11‑4‑1644. But we find, in the Royal House Archive of the Netherlands (4/1499^{d}), a letter from the mother who from Siegen reported the death of her son. The name of the town of Neuss has been crossed out and replaced with that of Düren: «bei der Stadt Deuren in einem Treffen eine Meile wegs jenseits von Düren». Further on she clarifies «between Cologne and Düren on the Steinstrasse». The date of death is mentioned as 1/11‑4‑1644.")), was a colonel in the Imperial Army. Married c. 1641 to Anna Barbara von Quadt-Landskron-Rheinbach.
11. Catharine (Siegen Castle, 1 August 1617 – Nassauischer Hof, Siegen, 31 August 1645).
12. John Ernest (Siegen Castle, 8 November 1618^{Jul.} (Note: "See various birth notifications preserved in the State Archives Wiesbaden (170^{III}): «den achten dieses v.s. vormittags, zwischen 8 u. 9 Uhr», and another in the National Archives of the Netherlands in The Hague, Inv. ns. Staten-Generaal 6049, drawn up in the same terms.") – São Salvador da Bahia de Todos os Santos, Brazil, 23 November 1639), was a naval officer on board the 'Alkmaar'.
13. Elisabeth Juliane (Siegen Castle, 1 May 1620^{Jul.} (Note: "See State Archives Wiesbaden (170^{III}). From Siegen, on 1-5-1620, the birth is announced «heute Montag (thus old style) den 1. May des Morgens umb 3 Uhren».") – Wesel, 13 May 1665), married in the Nassauischer Hof in Siegen on 9/19 August 1647 to Count Bernhard of Sayn-Wittgenstein-Berleburg-Neumagen (30 November 1620 – Aldenghoor Castle, 13 December 1675).
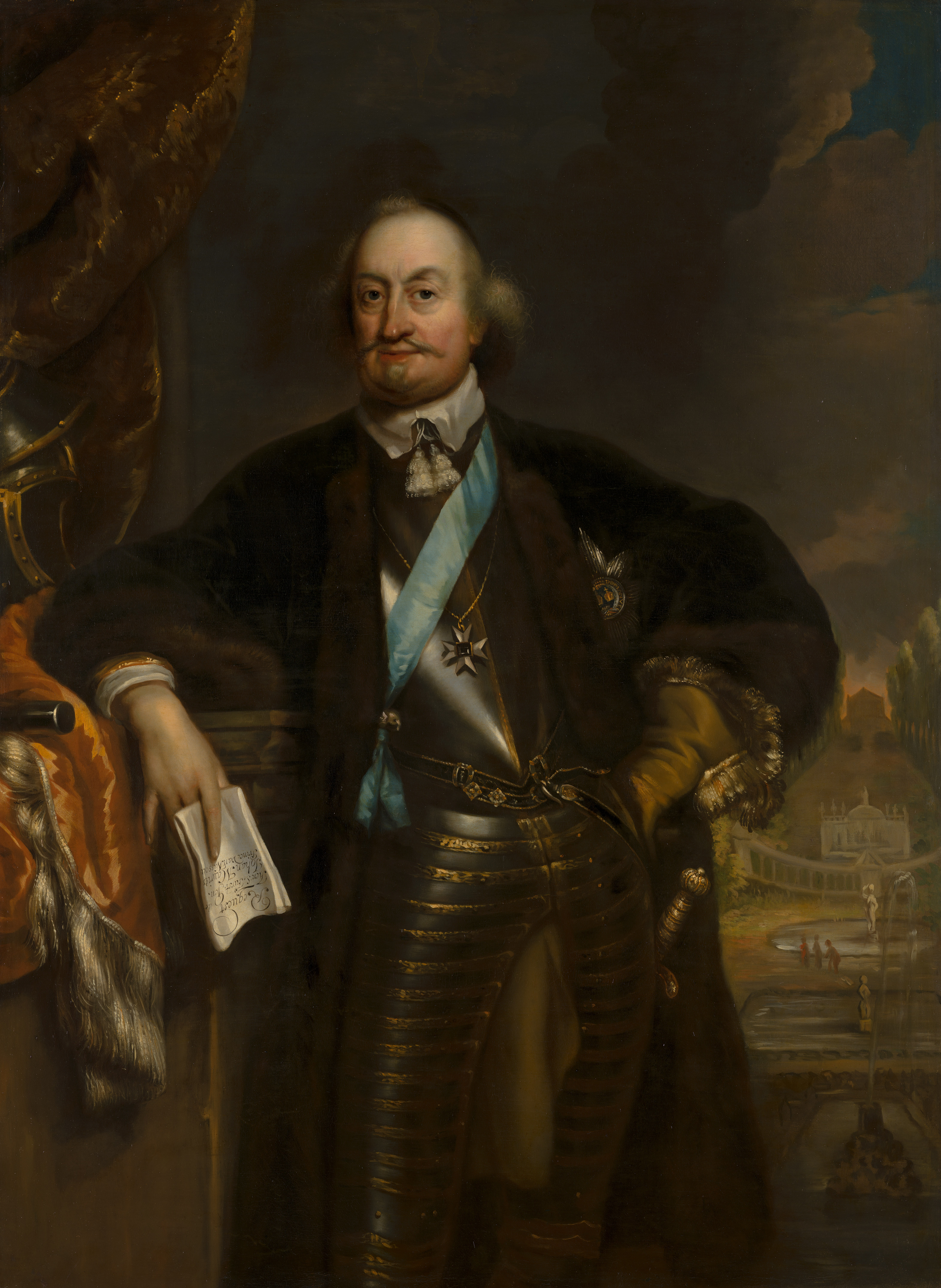
Fürst John Maurice of Nassau-Siegen (1604–1679). Portrait by Jan de Baen, c. 1668–1670. Mauritshuis, The Hague.

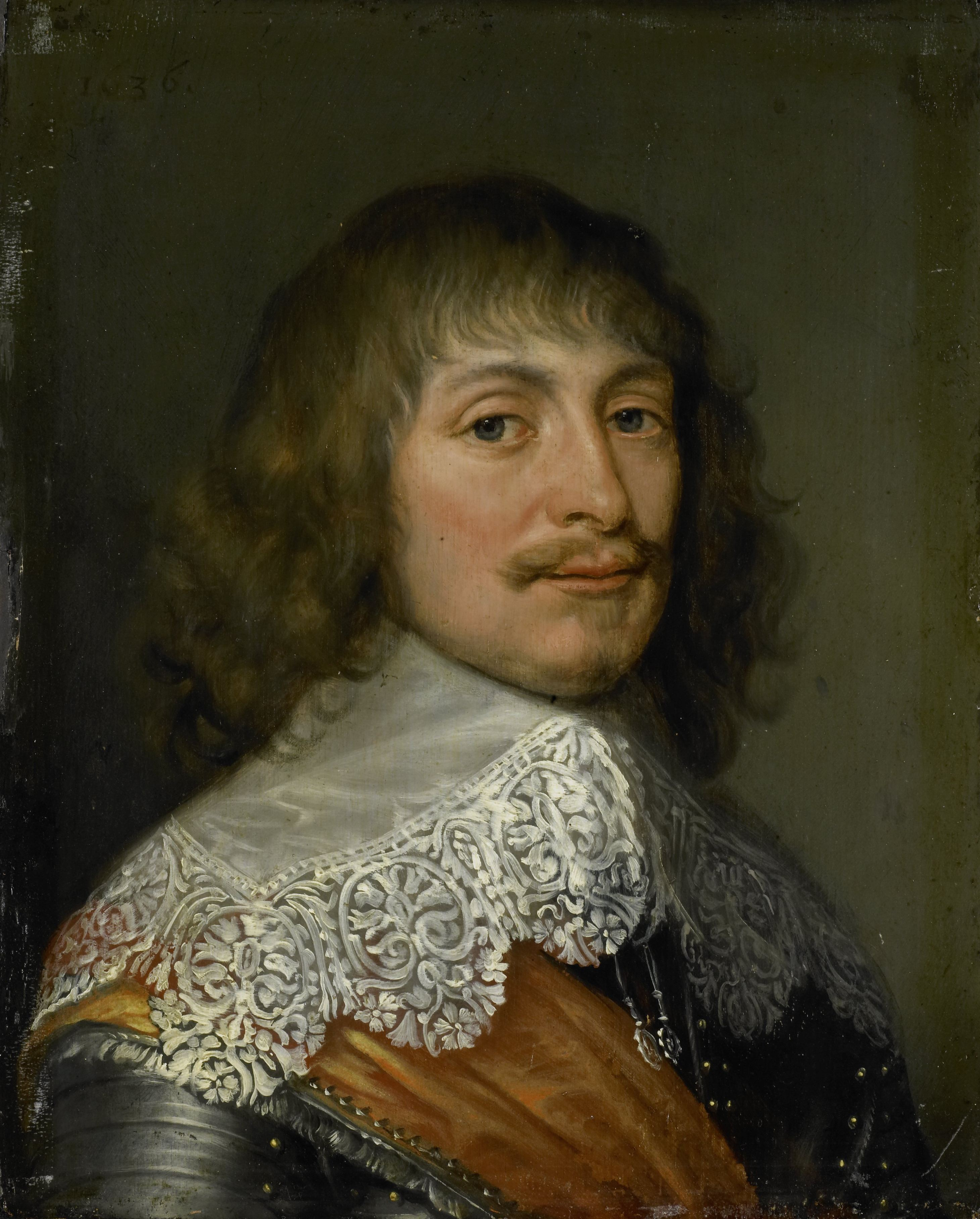
George Frederick of Nassau-Siegen (1606–1674). Anonymous portrait, 1636. Rijksmuseum Amsterdam.

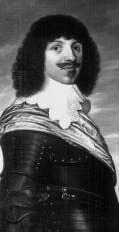
William Otto of Nassau-Siegen (1607–1641). Detail of a painting attributed to Wybrand de Geest, 1635–1640. Foundation Historical Collections of the House of Orange-Nassau, The Hague.

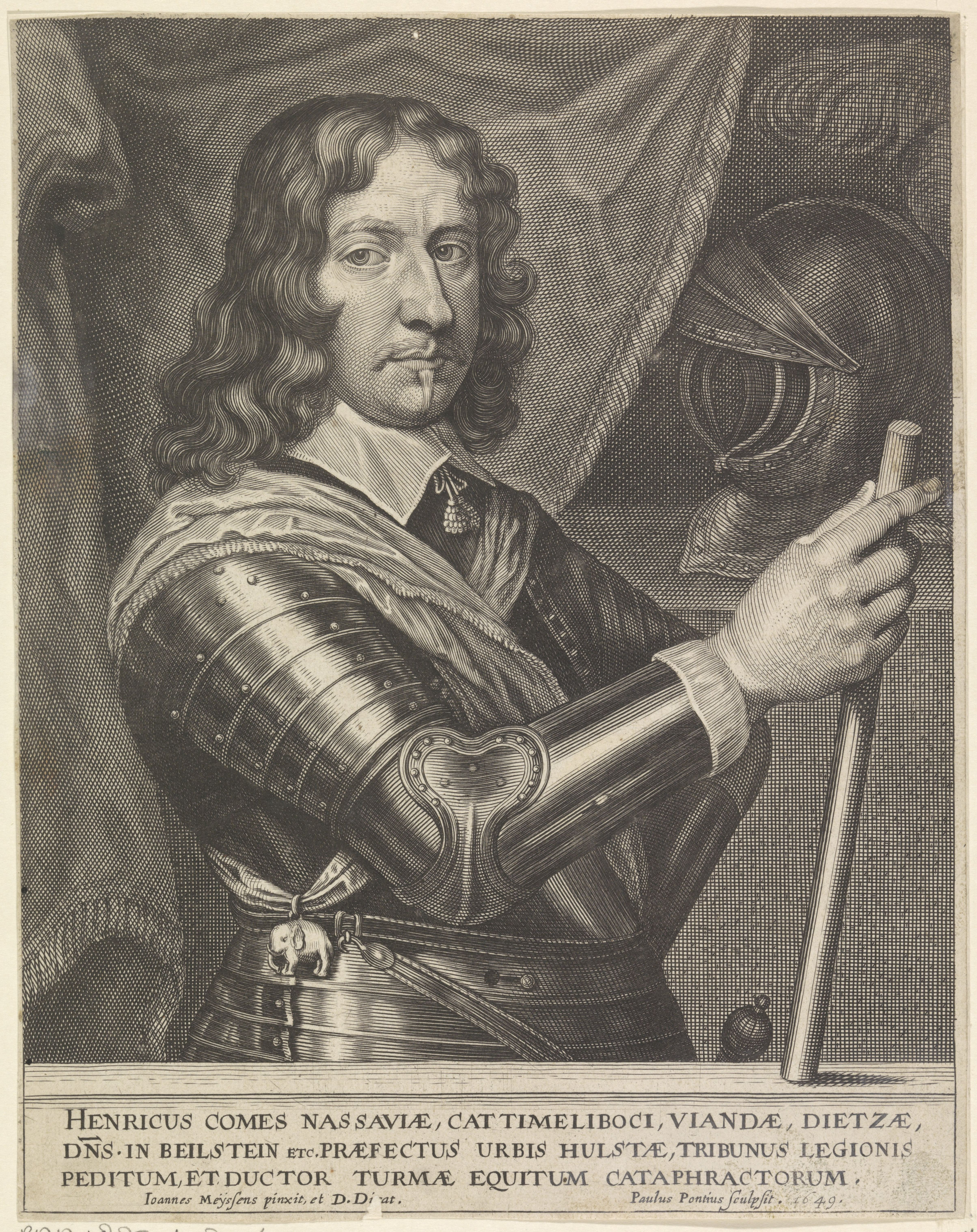
Henry of Nassau-Siegen (1611–1652). Print by Paulus Pontius after a painting by Joannes Meyssens, 1649. Rijksmuseum Amsterdam.

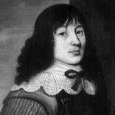
Christian of Nassau-Siegen (1616–1644). Detail of a painting attributed to Wybrand de Geest, 1635–1640. Foundation Historical Collections of the House of Orange-Nassau, The Hague.

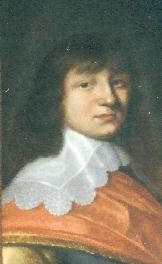
John Ernest of Nassau-Siegen (1618–1639). Detail of a painting by Gerard van Honthorst, c. 1633–1635. Stadhouderlijk Hof, Leeuwarden.

=== Known descendants ===
Although the House of Nassau-Siegen became extinct in male lineage in 1743, John the Middle has many known descendants in female lineage. Not only all reigning European monarchs are descendants of John, but also the heads of the no longer reigning royal houses of Austria, Baden, Bavaria, Greece, Lippe, Prussia, Romania and Waldeck and Pyrmont. Other known descendants are:

- the Prussian Field Marshal Fürst Leopold I of Anhalt-Dessau (der Alte Dessauer),
- the French Field Marshal Maurice of Saxony,
- the Austrian chancellor Klemens von Metternich,
- the French writer George Sand,
- the Romanian writer Carmen Sylva,
- the Norwegian explorer Fridtjof Nansen,
- the German chancellor Max von Baden, and
- the German fighter pilot from World War I Manfred von Richthofen (The Red Baron).

== Ancestors ==
Ancestors of Count John VII the Middle of Nassau-Siegen
Great-great-grandparents	John IV of Nassau-Siegen (1410–1475) ⚭ 1440; Mary of Looz-Heinsberg (1424–1502)	Henry III the Rich of Hesse-Marburg (1440–1483) ⚭ 1458; Anne of Katzenelnbogen (1443–1494)	Henry IX of Stolberg-Wernigerode (1436–1511) ⚭ 1452; Matilda of Mansfeld (d. 1469)	Philip I of Eppstein-Königstein (after 1440–1480/81) ⚭ 1473; Louise de la Marck (c. 1454–1524)	Frederick V of Leuchtenberg (1436–1487) ⚭ 1467; Dorothy of Rieneck (c. 1440–1503)	Günther XXXVIII of Schwarzburg-Blankenburg (1450–1484) ⚭ 1470; Catherine of Querfurt (d. 1531)	Albrecht III Achilles of Brandenburg (1414–1486) ⚭ 1458; Anne of Saxony (1437–1512)	Casimir IV of Poland (1427–1492) ⚭ 1454; Elisabeth of Austria (1435/36–1505)
Great-grandparents	John V of Nassau-Siegen (1455–1516) ⚭ 1482; Elisabeth of Hesse-Marburg (1466–1523)		Bodo III the Blissful of Stolberg-Wernigerode (1467–1538) ⚭ 1500; Anne of Eppstein-Königstein (1481–1538)		John IV of Leuchtenberg (1470–1531) ⚭ 1502; Margaret of Schwarzburg-Blankenburg (1482–1518)		Frederick I the Elder of Brandenburg-Ansbach (1460–1536) ⚭ 1479; Sophia of Poland (1464–1512)	
Grandparents	William I the Rich of Nassau-Siegen (1487–1559) ⚭ 1531; Juliane of Stolberg-Wernigerode (1506–1580)				George III of Leuchtenberg (1502–1555) ⚭ 1528; Barbara of Brandenburg-Ansbach (1495–1552)			
Parents	John VI the Elder of Nassau-Siegen (1536–1606) ⚭ 1559; Elisabeth of Leuchtenberg (1537–1579)							

== Sources ==
- Van der Aa, A.J. (1855). "Brederode (Joan Wolfert van)". Biographisch Woordenboek der Nederlanden, bevattende levensbeschrijvingen van zoodanige personen, die zich op eenigerlei wijze in ons vaderland hebben vermaard gemaakt (in Dutch). Vol. Tweede deel. Tweede stuk. Haarlem: J.J. van Brederode. pp. 1265–1268.
- Aßmann, Helmut & Menk, Friedhelm (1996). Auf den Spuren von Nassau und Oranien in Siegen (in German). Siegen: Gesellschaft für Stadtmarketing Siegen e.V.
- Becker, E. (1983) [1950]. Schloss und Stadt Dillenburg. Ein Gang durch ihre Geschichte in Mittelalter und Neuzeit. Zur Gedenkfeier aus Anlaß der Verleihung der Stadtrechte am 20. September 1344 herausgegeben (in German) (Neuauflage ed.). Dillenburg: Der Magistrat der Stadt Dillenburg.
- von Behr, Kamill (1854). Genealogie der in Europa regierenden Fürstenhäuser (in German). Leipzig: Verlag von Bernhard Tauchnitz.
- Blok, P.J. (1911). "George Frederik, Georg Friedrich". In Molhuysen, P.C. & Blok, P.J. (eds.). Nieuw Nederlandsch Biografisch Woordenboek (in Dutch). Vol. Eerste deel. Leiden: A.W. Sijthoff. p. 926.
- Blok, P.J. (1911). "Johan VII". In Molhuysen, P.C. & Blok, P.J. (eds.). Nieuw Nederlandsch Biografisch Woordenboek (in Dutch). Vol. Eerste deel. Leiden: A.W. Sijthoff. p. 1221.
- Blok, P.J. (1911). "Johan (Johann), de Jongere, graaf van Nassau-Siegen". In Molhuysen, P.C. & Blok, P.J. (eds.). Nieuw Nederlandsch Biografisch Woordenboek (in Dutch). Vol. Eerste deel. Leiden: A.W. Sijthoff. pp. 1221–1222.
- De La Chenaye-Desbois, François Alexandre Aubert (1784). Recueil de généalogies, pour servir de suite ou de supplément au dictionnaire de la noblesse (in French). Vol. Tome IV. Paris: M. Badier. pp. 683–684.
- De La Chenaye-Desbois, François Alexandre Aubert (1876). Dictionnaire de la noblesse (in French). Vol. Tome Dix-Neuvième. Paris: Schlesinger. pp. 1033–1035.
- De Clercq, Carlo (1962). "Die katholischen Fürsten von Nassau-Siegen". Nassauische Annalen (in German). Vol. Band 73. Wiesbaden. pp. 129–152.
- Deconinck, J. & J. (1965). "Genealogie van de Heren van Ronse (De Families Nassau-Siegen en Mero-de-Westerloo)". Annalen. Geschied- en oudheidkundige kring van Ronse en het tenement van Inde (in Dutch). Ronse/Renaix. pp. 103–118.
- Dek, A.W.E. (1962). Graf Johann der Mittlere von Nassau-Siegen und seine 25 Kinder (in German). Rijswijk: Krips Repro.
- Dek, A.W.E. (1968). "De afstammelingen van Juliana van Stolberg tot aan het jaar van de Vrede van Münster". Spiegel der Historie. Maandblad voor de geschiedenis der Nederlanden (in Dutch). 1968 (7/8): 228–303.
- Dek, A.W.E. (1970). Genealogie van het Vorstenhuis Nassau (in Dutch). Zaltbommel: Europese Bibliotheek.
- Van Deursen, A.Th. (2000). Maurits van Nassau. De winnaar die faalde (in Dutch). Amsterdam: Uitgeverij Bert Bakker. ISBN 90-351-2272-0.
- Van Ditzhuyzen, Reinildis (2004) [1992]. Oranje-Nassau. Een biografisch woordenboek (in Dutch) (3rd ed.). Haarlem: Becht. ISBN 90-230-1124-4.
- von Ehrenkrook, Hans Friedrich; Förster, Karl & Marchtaler, Kurt Erhard (1928). Ahnenreihen aus allen deutschen Gauen. Beilage zum Archiv für Sippenforschung und allen verwandten Gebieten (in German). Görlitz: Verlag für Sippenforschung und Wappenkunde C.A. Starke.
- Elgenstierna, Gustaf (1936). Den Introducerade Svenska Adelns Ättartavlor (in Swedish). Vol. IX. Stockholm: P.A. Norstedt & Söners Förlag.
- Emmius, Ubbo (1994). Willem Lodewijk, graaf van Nassau (1560–1620). Stadhouder van Friesland, Groningen en Drenthe (in Dutch). Hilversum: Uitgeverij Verloren. ISBN 90-6550-382-X.
- Glawischnig, Rolf (1974). "Johann VII.". Neue Deutsche Biographie (in German). Vol. Band 10. Berlin: Duncker & Humblot. p. 501. ISBN 3-428-00191-5.
- Glawischnig, Rolf (1974). "Johann VIII.". Neue Deutsche Biographie (in German). Vol. Band 10. Berlin: Duncker & Humblot. pp. 501–502. ISBN 3-428-00191-5.
- Haarmann, Torsten (2014). Das Haus Waldeck und Pyrmont. Mehr als 900 Jahre Gesamtgeschichte mit Stammfolge. Deutsche Fürstenhäuser (in German). Vol. Heft 35. Werl: Börde-Verlag. ISBN 978-3-981-4458-2-4.
- Hæutle, Christian (1870). Genealogie des erlauchten Stammhauses Wittelsbach: von dessen Wiedereinsetzung in das Herzogthum Bayern (11. Sept. 1180) bis herab auf unsere Tage (in German). München: Hermann Manz'nsche Hofkunsthandlung und Buchhandlung.
- Heniger, J. (1999). "Genealogische tabellen". In Koenhein, A.J.M.; Brederoo, P.; Will, Chr.; Heniger, J.; Leeuwenberg, H.L.Ph. & Den Hertog, P.T. (eds.). Johan Wolfert van Brederode 1599-1655. Een Hollands edelman tussen Nassau en Oranje (in Dutch). Vianen & Zutphen: Historische Vereniging Het Land van Brederode & Uitgeversmaatschappij Walburg Pers. pp. 133–135. ISBN 90-5730-034-6.
- Hoffmeister, Jacob Christoph Carl (1883). Historisch-genealogisches Handbuch über alle Grafen und Fürsten von Waldeck und Pyrmont seit 1228 (in German). Cassel: Verlag Gustav Klaunig.
- Huberty, Michel; Giraud, Alain & Magdelaine, F. & B. (1976). l'Allemagne Dynastique (in French). Vol. Tome I: Hesse-Reuss-Saxe. Le Perreux: Alain Giraud. ISBN 2-901138-01-2.
- Huberty, Michel; Giraud, Alain & Magdelaine, F. & B. (1981). l'Allemagne Dynastique (in French). Vol. Tome III: Brunswick-Nassau-Schwarzbourg. Le Perreux: Alain Giraud. ISBN 2-901138-03-9.
- Huberty, Michel; Giraud, Alain & Magdelaine, F. & B. (1989). l'Allemagne Dynastique (in French). Vol. Tome V: Hohenzollern-Waldeck-Familles alliées A-B. Le Perreux-sur-Marne: Alain Giraud. ISBN 2-901138-05-5.
- Huberty, Michel; Giraud, Alain & Magdelaine, F. & B. (1994). l'Allemagne Dynastique (in French). Vol. Tome VII: Oldenbourg-Familles alliées H-L. Le Perreux-sur-Marne: Alain Giraud. ISBN 2-901138-07-1.
- Joachim, Ernst (1881). "Johann der Mittlere von Nassau-Siegen". Allgemeine Deutsche Biographie (in German). Vol. Band 14. Leipzig: Duncker & Humblot. pp. 265–266.
- Joachim, Ernst (1881). "Johann der Jüngere von Nassau-Siegen". Allgemeine Deutsche Biographie (in German). Vol. Band 14. Leipzig: Duncker & Humblot. pp. 266–268.
- Knetsch, Carl (1931). Das Haus Brabant. Genealogie der Herzoge von Brabant und der Landgrafen von Hessen (in German). Vol. II. Teil: Die Nachkommen Philipps des Grossmütigen. Darmstadt: Historischer Verein für das Großherzogtum Hessen.
- Koenhein, A.J.M. & Heniger, J. (1999). "Johan Wolfert van Brederode 1599–1655 – 'In Opbloey neergetoghen'". In Koenhein, A.J.M.; Brederoo, P.; Will, Chr.; Heniger, J.; Leeuwenberg, H.L.Ph. & Den Hertog, P.T. (eds.). Johan Wolfert van Brederode 1599-1655. Een Hollands edelman tussen Nassau en Oranje (in Dutch). Vianen & Zutphen: Historische Vereniging Het Land van Brederode & Uitgeversmaatschappij Walburg Pers. pp. 9–46. ISBN 90-5730-034-6.
- Kooijmans, Luuc (2000). Liefde in opdracht. Het hofleven van Willem Frederik van Nassau (in Dutch). Amsterdam: Uitgeverij Bert Bakker. ISBN 90-351-2201-1.
- De Ligne née Cossé-Brissac, Princesse (1936). Claire Marie de Nassau, Princesse de Ligne (in French). Brussel: l'Édition universelle.
- Lück, Alfred (1981) [1967]. Siegerland und Nederland (in German) (2nd ed.). Siegen: Siegerländer Heimatverein e.V.
- Lück, Alfred & Wunderlich, Hermann (1956) [1952]. Die Fürstengruft zu Siegen (in German). Siegen: Verkehrsverein Siegen e.V.
- Menk, Friedhelm (1967). "Johann der Mittlere, Graf zu Nassau-Siegen (1561–1623) und seine zweite Gemahlin". Siegerland (in German). Band XLIV (Heft 1): 1–28.
- Menk, Friedhelm (1971). Quellen zur Geschichte des Siegerlandes im niederländischen königlichen Hausarchiv (in German). Siegen: Stadt Siegen & Forschungsstelle Siegerland.
- Menk, Friedhelm (1979). "Johann Moritz Fürst zu Nassau-Siegen". Siegerland (in German). Band LVI (Heft 1–2): 1vv.
- Menk, Friedhelm (1994). "Die nassauischen Begräbnisstätten in der ev. Stadtkirche zu Dillenburg". In Pletz-Krehahn, Hans-Jürgen (ed.). 650 Jahre Stadt Dillenburg. Ein Text- und Bildband zum Stadtrechtsjubiläum der Oranierstadt (in German). Dillenburg: Verlag E. Weidenbach GmbH + Co. KG. pp. 119–125.
- Menk, Friedhelm (2004). "Die Fürstengruft zu Siegen und die darin von 1669 bis 1781 erfolgten Beisetzungen". In Burwitz, Ludwig; Menk, Friedhelm; Opfermann, Ulrich Friedrich; Pfau, Dieter & Plaum, Bernd D. (eds.). Siegener Beiträge. Jahrbuch für regionale Geschichte (in German). Vol. 9. Siegen: Geschichtswerkstatt Siegen – Arbeitskreis für Regionalgeschichte e.V. pp. 183–202. ISSN 1431-6684.
- Muller, P.L. (1898). "Wilhelm (Graf von Nassau-Siegen und Dillenburg)". Allgemeine Deutsche Biographie (in German). Vol. Band 43. Leipzig: Duncker & Humblot. p. 133.
- Graf von Oeynhausen, Julius & Grotefend, H. (1889). Geschichte des Geslechts von Oeynhausen. Aus gedruckten und ungedruckten Quellen (in German). Vol. Dritter Theil: Biographische Bearbeitung. Frankfurt am Main: Wilhelm Rommel.
- Pletz-Krehahn, Hans-Jürgen (1994). "Beisetzungen in den 15 Grabstellen der Dillenburger Nassauergruft". In Pletz-Krehahn, Hans-Jürgen (ed.). 650 Jahre Stadt Dillenburg. Ein Text- und Bildband zum Stadtrechtsjubiläum der Oranierstadt (in German). Dillenburg: Verlag E. Weidenbach GmbH + Co. KG. pp. 115–118.
- Poelhekke, J.J. (1978). Frederik Hendrik, Prins van Oranje. Een biografisch drieluik (PDF) (in Dutch). Zutphen: De Walburg Pers. ISBN 90-6011-443-4.
- Romein, J.M. (1937). "Brederode, Joan Wolfert van". In Molhuysen, P.C. & Kossmann, F.K.H. (eds.). Nieuw Nederlandsch Biografisch Woordenboek (in Dutch). Vol. Tiende deel. Leiden: A.W. Sijthoff. pp. 125–126.
- Schutte, O. (1979). "Genealogische gegevens". In Tamse, C.A. (ed.). Nassau en Oranje in de Nederlandse geschiedenis (in Dutch). Alphen aan den Rijn: A.W. Sijthoff. pp. 40–44, 224–228. ISBN 90-218-2447-7.
- Spielmann, Christian (1909). Geschichte von Nassau (Land und Haus) von den ältesten Zeiten bis zur Gegenwart (in German). Vol. Teil 1. Politische Geschichten. Wiesbaden: P. Plauen.
- Textor von Haiger, Johann (1617). Nassauische Chronik. In welcher des vralt, hochlöblich, vnd weitberühmten Stamms vom Hause Naßaw, Printzen vnd Graven Genealogi oder Stammbaum: deren geburt, leben, heurath, kinder, zu Friden- vnd Kriegszeiten verzichtete sachen und thaten, absterben, und sonst denckwürdige Geschichten. Sampt einer kurtzen general Nassoviae und special Beschreibung der Graf- und Herschaften Naßaw-Catzenelnbogen, etc (in German). Herborn: Christoph Raab.
- Vorsterman van Oyen, A.A. (1882). Het vorstenhuis Oranje-Nassau. Van de vroegste tijden tot heden (in Dutch). Leiden & Utrecht: A.W. Sijthoff & J.L. Beijers.
- Zandvliet, Kees, ed. (2000). Maurits prins van Oranje. Amsterdam & Zwolle: Rijksmuseum & Uitgeverij Waanders b.v. ISBN 90-400-9497-7.

John VII of Nassau-Siegen House of Nassau-Siegen Born: 7 June 1561 Died: 27 September 1623
Regnal titles
Preceded by John VI the Elder	Count of Nassau-Siegen; 8 October 1606 – 27 September 1623	Succeeded by John VIII the Younger
