= George III, Landgrave of Leuchtenberg =

Landgrave of Leuchtenberg (1502–1555)

- Born: 13 December 1502
- Died: 21 May 1555 (aged 52)
- Noble family: House of Leuchtenberg
- Spouse: Barbara of Brandenburg-Ansbach-Kulmbach
- Father: John IV, Landgrave of Leuchtenberg
- Mother: Margaret of Schwarzburg

George III, Landgrave of Leuchtenberg (13 December 1502 – 21 May 1555) was Landgrave of Leuchtenberg from 1 September 1531 to 1555.

George succeeded John IV as Landgrave after his death in 1531. His mother was Margareta von Schwarzburg, who had died in 1518.

After completing his studies, he became and advisor and treasurer to Emperor Charles V and fought in the Battle of Pavia in 1525. His post required that he provide horses and knights to Duke Louis X of Bavaria and to the Emperor to fight the war against the Ottoman Empire. He borrowed the knights and horses, as well as 14000guilders from Elector Palatine Otto Henry.

In 1546, George III and Elector Palatine Frederick III signed the Treaty of Heidelberg, which defined the boundary between Leuchtenberg and the Palatinate and the privileges of Leuchtenberg. George's brother, Christopher of Leuchtenberg (d. 1554) commanded the cavalry in the army of Albert II Alcibiades. Christopher and Albert took several loans from George and the latter was cited before the Reichskammergericht for breach of the peace. He had to temporarily hand over the Lordship of Grünsfeld and compensate the victims of the looting and pillaging. His brother Christopher died impoverished in a guest house in Regensburg. His second brother Hans was mentally ill and lived most of his life with their sister in Wallerstein.

== Marriage and issue ==
George III married on 29 September 1527 at the Plassenburg with Barbara of Brandenburg-Ansbach-Kulmbach, daughter of Margrave Frederick I of Brandenburg-Ansbach. With her he had four children

- George IV (d. 1553)
- Louis Henry (1529-1567), Landgrave of Leuchtenberg, married in 1549 with Countess Mathilda of the Marck-Arenberg (1530-1603)
- Elizabeth (1537-1579), married in 1559 with Count John VI of Nassau-Dillenburg (1536-1606)
- Barbara

George III, Landgrave of Leuchtenberg House of Leuchtenberg Born: 13 December 1502 Died: 21 May 1555
Preceded by John IV	Landgrave of Leuchtenberg; 1531-1555	Succeeded by Louis Henry
