= Grünsfeld =

- Town
- Coat of arms

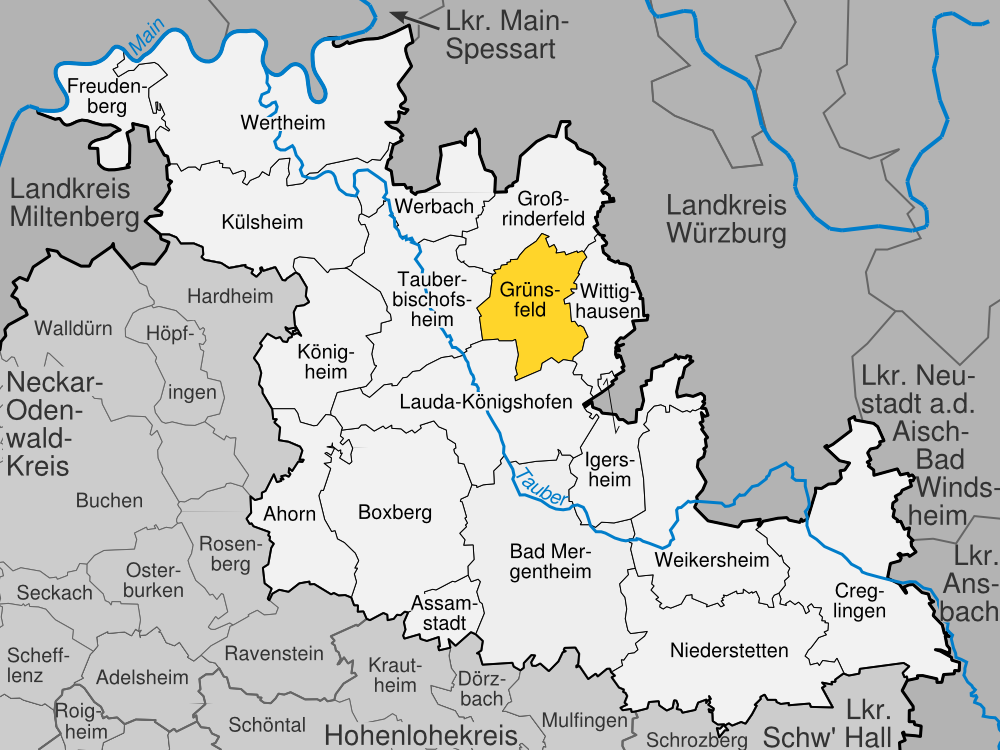
- Location of Grünsfeld within Main-Tauber-Kreis district
- Interactive map of Grünsfeld
- Location within Germany Location within Baden-Württemberg
- Coordinates: 49°36′N 9°45′E
- Country: Germany
- State: Baden-Württemberg
- Admin. region: Stuttgart
- District: Main-Tauber-Kreis

Government
  - Mayor (2021–29): Joachim Markert (CDU)

Area
  - Total: 44.72 km^{2} (17.27 sq mi)
- Elevation: 210 m (690 ft)

Population (2025-12-31)
  - Total: 3,647
  - Density: 81.55/km^{2} (211.2/sq mi)
- Time zone: UTC+01:00 (CET)
  - Summer (DST): UTC+02:00 (CEST)
- Postal codes: 97947
- Dialling codes: 09346
- Vehicle registration: TBB
- Website: www.gruensfeld.de

Grünsfeld (German pronunciation: [ˈɡʁyːnsfɛlt]) is a town and a municipality in the Main-Tauber district, in Baden-Württemberg, Germany. It is situated 6 km east of Tauberbischofsheim, and 25 km southwest of Würzburg. It consists of the villages Grünsfeld, Grünsfeldhausen, Krensheim, Kützbrunn, Paimar, and Zimmern.

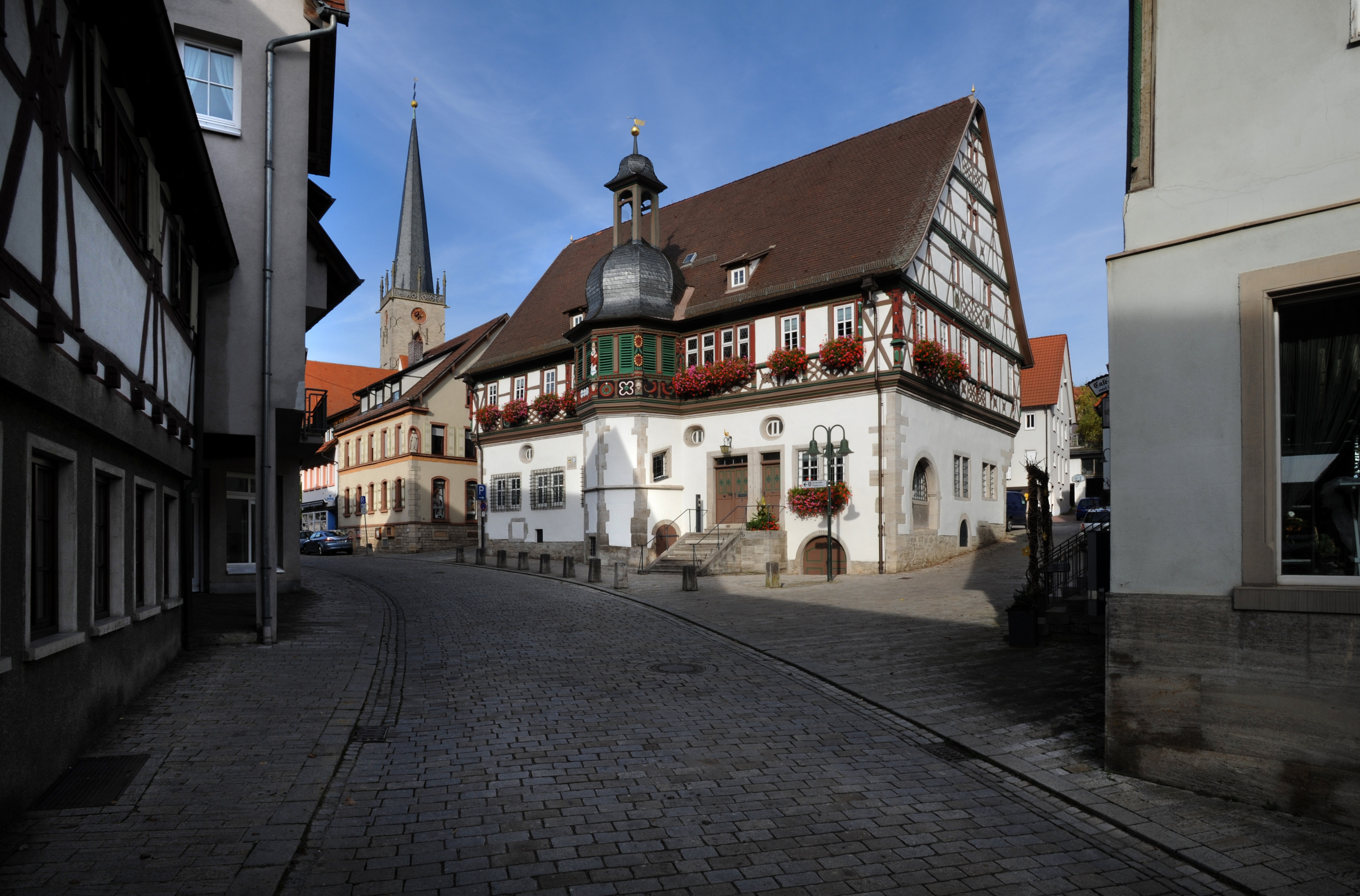
Grünsfeld

== Local council (Gemeinderat) ==
Elections were held in May 2014:

List	2014		2009	
CDU/Freie Wählervereinigung (Free voters)	57,7 %	12 seats	57,1 %	10 seats
Freie Bürgerliste (Free citizens list)	42,3 %	9 seats	42,9 %	8 seats

== Mayors ==
- 1985–2013: Alfred Beetz (CDU)
- since 2013: Joachim Markert (CDU)

=== Sons and daughters of the city ===
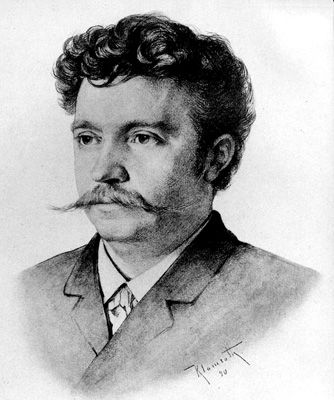
Fritz Steinbach in 1890

- 1470, John IV, Landgrave of Leuchtenberg, † 1 September 1531, Landgraf of Leuchtenberg
- 17 June 1855, Fritz Steinbach, † August 13, 1916, Brahms conductor and composer
