= John IV, Landgrave of Leuchtenberg =

- Born: 1470; Pfreimd
- Died: 1 September 1531; Grünsfeld
- Noble family: House of Leuchtenberg
- Spouse: Margaret of Schwarzburg
- Father: Frederick V of Leuchtenberg
- Mother: Dorothea of Rieneck

John IV, Landgrave of Leuchtenberg (1470 in Pfreimd – 1 September 1531 in Grünsfeld) was Landgrave of Leuchtenberg from 1487 until his death. He was the son and heir of Landgrave Frederick V of Leuchtenberg (d. 19 May 1487 in Nuremberg) and his wife Dorothea of Rieneck.

During the Landshut War of Succession, John fought on the side of Elector Palatine Philip. After the war, he was briefly expelled by Emperor Maximilian I. Nevertheless, he was hired by Duke George of Bavaria and later by Elector Palatine Louis V. Between 1513 and 1518, he served as governor of Amberg, earning an annual salary of 1000 guilders. This additional income allowed him to lend money to Elector Palatine Otto Henry and his brother Philip and to Margrave Frederick I "the Elder" of Brandenburg-Ansbach. However, most of the money was never repaid.

In 1515, he sold Neuhaus to Waldsessen Abbey. In 1530, he purchased Luhe and Wernberg from Hans Adam Wißpeck zu Volburg and granted city status to the town of Pfreimd, where he lived. He also introduced the primogeniture in Leuchtenberg.

== Marriage and issue ==
He married Margaret of Schwarzburg (d. 1518) and had five children with her:

- George III (1502–1555), Landgrave of Leuchtenberg from 1531
- Anna (1506–1555), married Count Martin of Oettingen (d. 1549)
- Elisabeth (1508–1560), married Count Charles Wolfgang of Oettingen (d. 1549)
- John (1511–1572), who was mentally challenged
- Christopher of Leuchtenberg (d. 1554)

John IV, Landgrave of Leuchtenberg House of Leuchtenberg Born: 1470 Died: 1 September 1531
Preceded by Frederick V	Landgrave of Leuchtenberg; 1487-1531	Succeeded by George III
