= Adolf of Nassau-Siegen (1586–1608) =

German count and officer in the Dutch Army (1586–1608)

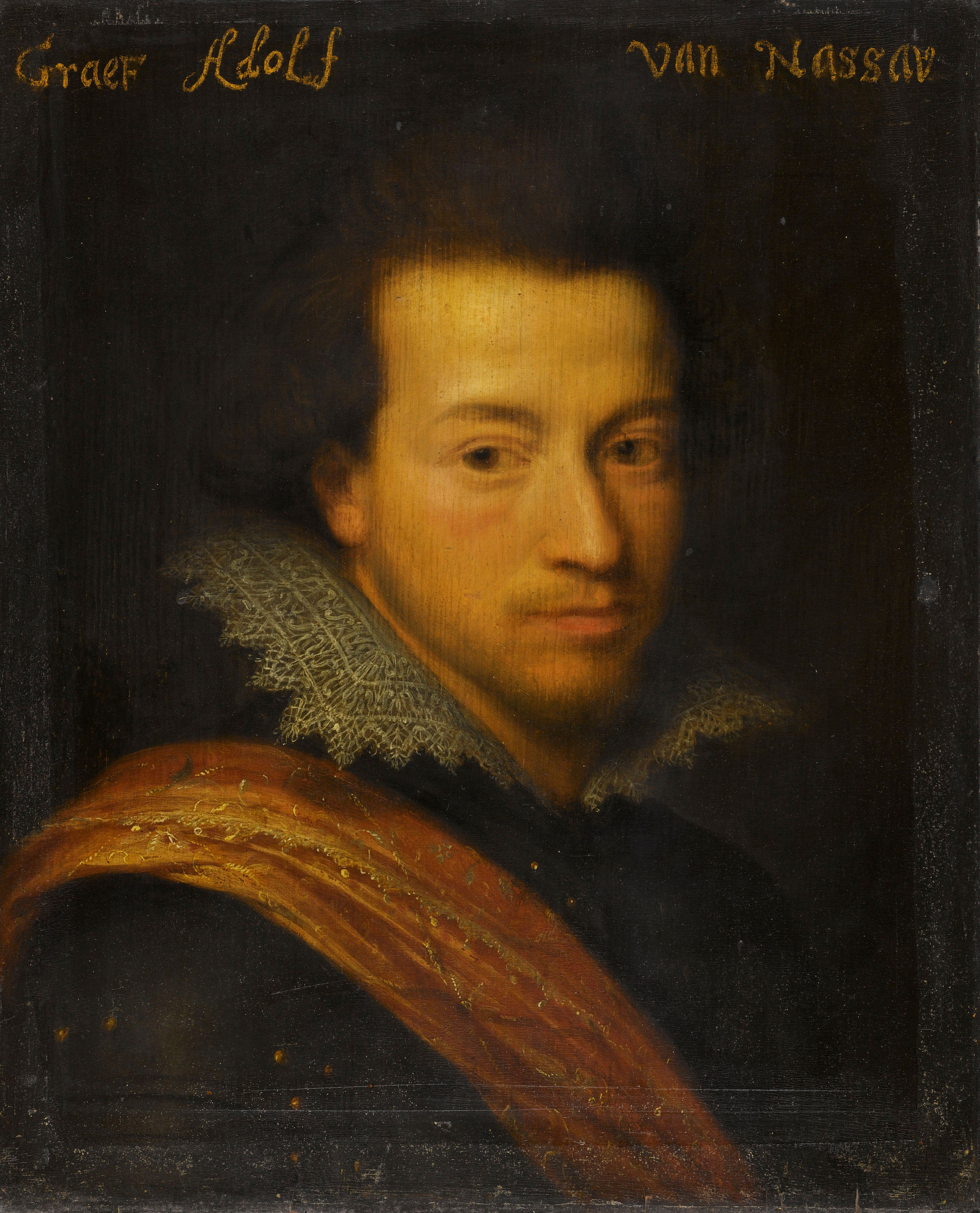
- Count Adolf of Nassau-Siegen. Attributed to Jan Antonisz. van Ravesteyn, c. 1609–1633. Rijksmuseum Amsterdam.

- Coat of arms
- Full name: Adolf Count of Nassau-Siegen
- Native name: Adolf Graf von Nassau-Siegen
- Born: Adolf Graf zu Nassau, Katzenelnbogen, Vianden und Diez, Herr zu Beilstein; 8 August 1586; Dillenburg Castle
- Baptised: 21 August 1586^{Jul.}
- Died: 7 November 1608 (aged 22); Xanten
- Buried: 23 November 1608; Saint Stephen's Church, Nijmegen
- Noble family: House of Nassau-Siegen
- Spouse: –
- Issue: –
- Father: John VII the Middle of Nassau-Siegen
- Mother: Magdalene of Waldeck-Wildungen
- Occupation: Ritmeester in the Dutch States Army

Count Adolf of Nassau-Siegen (8 August 1586 – 7 November 1608), German: Adolf Graf von Nassau-Siegen, official titles: Graf zu Nassau, Katzenelnbogen, Vianden und Diez, Herr zu Beilstein, was a count from the House of Nassau-Siegen, a cadet branch of the Ottonian Line of the House of Nassau. He served as an officer in the Dutch States Army. In the propaganda for the House of Orange, he is regarded as one of the twelve heroes of the House of Nassau who gave their lives in the Eighty Years' War for the freedom of the Dutch people.

== Biography ==
Adolf was born at Dillenburg Castle on 8 August 1586 as the third son of Count John VII the Middle of Nassau-Siegen and his first wife, Countess Magdalene of Waldeck-Wildungen. He was baptised on Sunday 21 August^{Jul.}.

Adolf studied in Geneva in 1601, and then in Basel and in France. He entered the Dutch States Army in 1604 and took part in the Siege of Ostend (1604) and the Siege of Sluis (1604). On 3 April 1606 he was appointed ritmeester over a company of 86 horsemen. In 1608 he was with his father in the Palatinate. He then undertook an expedition to Luxembourg and was killed on the retreat on 7 November 1608 near Xanten. He was buried on 23 November 1608 in the Saint Stephen's Church in Nijmegen.

Adolf and his older brothers John Ernest and John the Younger had the reputation of being gamblers and of showing a completely unseemly splendour in their clothes and appearance. Their father wrote letters to the young counts, full of fatherly admonitions, exhorting them to be thrifty, because he did not know what to do with his worries and debts. In a letter of 8 December 1608 he even considered the death of Adolf as a punishment from God and he exhorted the two others, who with "einem ärgerlichen Leben mit Verschwendung fast allem, was ich in der Welt habe, durch Ehebrechen und Hurerei, Plünderung und Beraubung armer, unschuldiger Leute hoch und niederen Standen" ("an annoying life of squandering almost everything I have in the world, through adultery and fornication, plundering and robbing poor, innocent people of high and low rank") ruined the county of Nassau-Siegen, to lead a different, better life, worthy of the name Nassau.

In 1901, on the initiative of municipal archivist H.D.J. van Schevichaven, a plaque measuring 103 by 64 cm was affixed to the northern transept of St. Stephen's Church in Nijmegen. The text on this plaque reads (translated into English):

"IN THE MONTH OF NOVEMBER 1608
WAS BURIED HERE
ADOLF COUNT OF NASSAU SIEGEN
THIRD SON OF JOHN COUNT OF NASSAU SIEGEN
AND OF MAGDALENE OF WALDECK
FALLEN AT THE AGE OF 22
IN A BATTLE NEAR XANTEN
HE WAS ONE OF THE TWELVE HEROES
FROM THE HOUSE OF NASSAU
WHO IN THE EIGHTY YEARS' WAR
GAVE THEIR LIVES FOR THE FREEDOM
OF THE DUTCH PEOPLE"

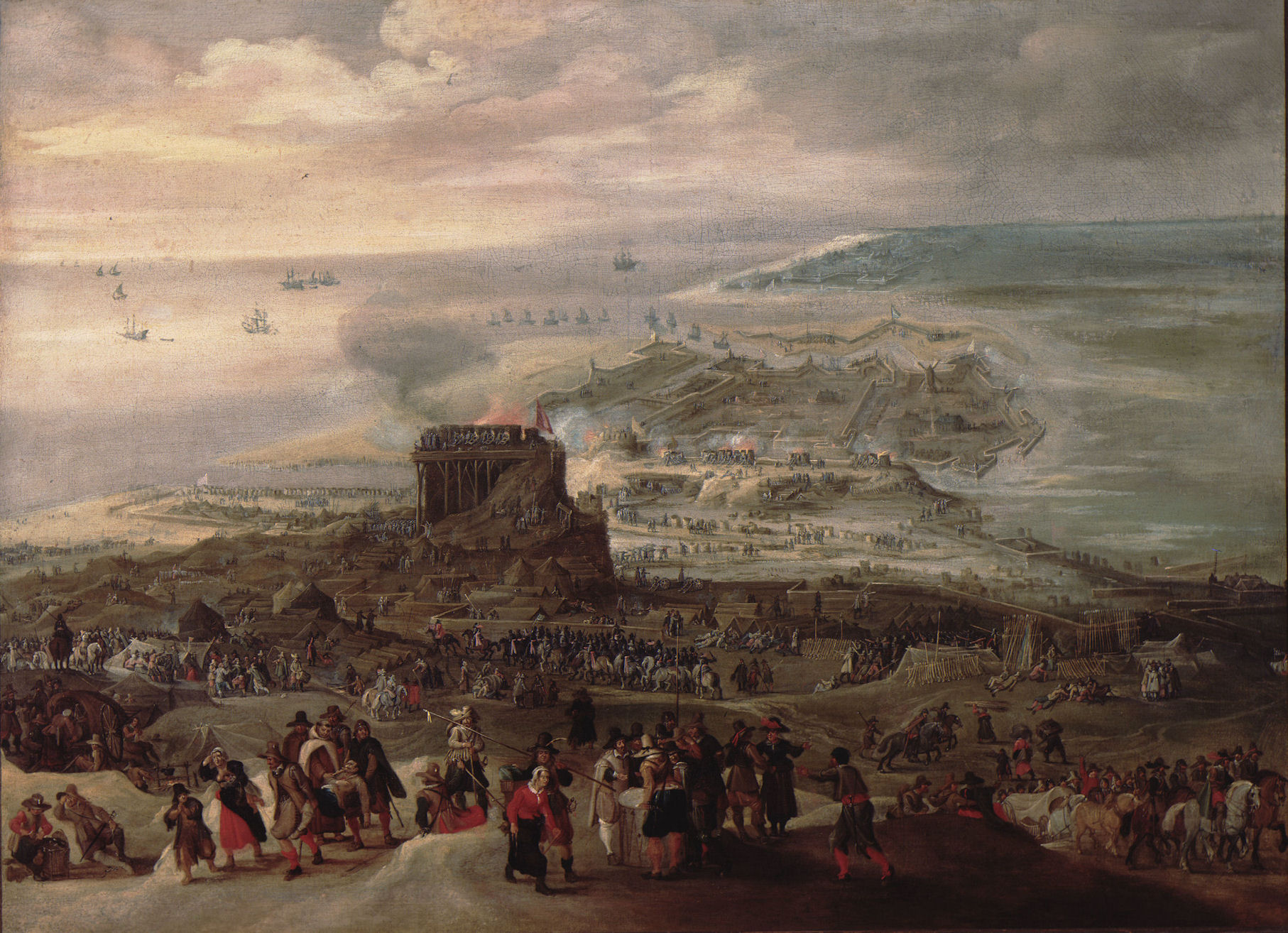
The Siege of Ostend (1601–1604). Painting by Peter Snayers, 17th century. Museum Het Prinsenhof, Delft.

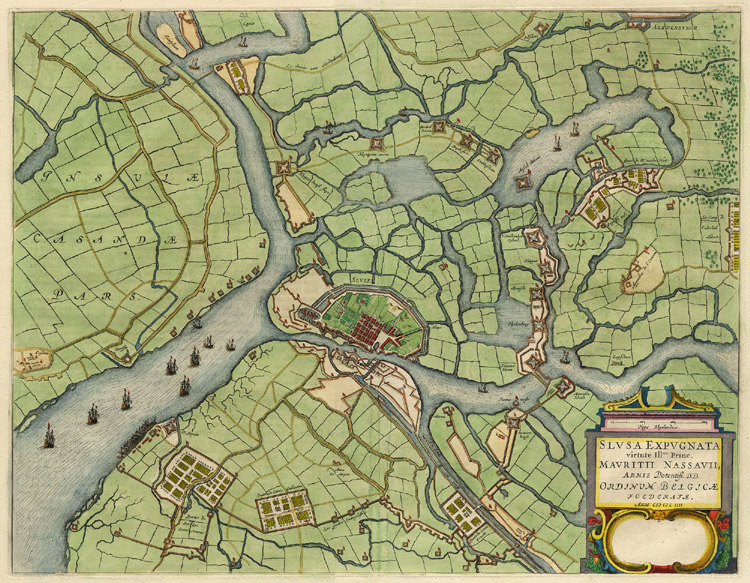
The Siege of Sluis (1604). Engraving by Joan Blaeu. From the Atlas van Loon, 1649.

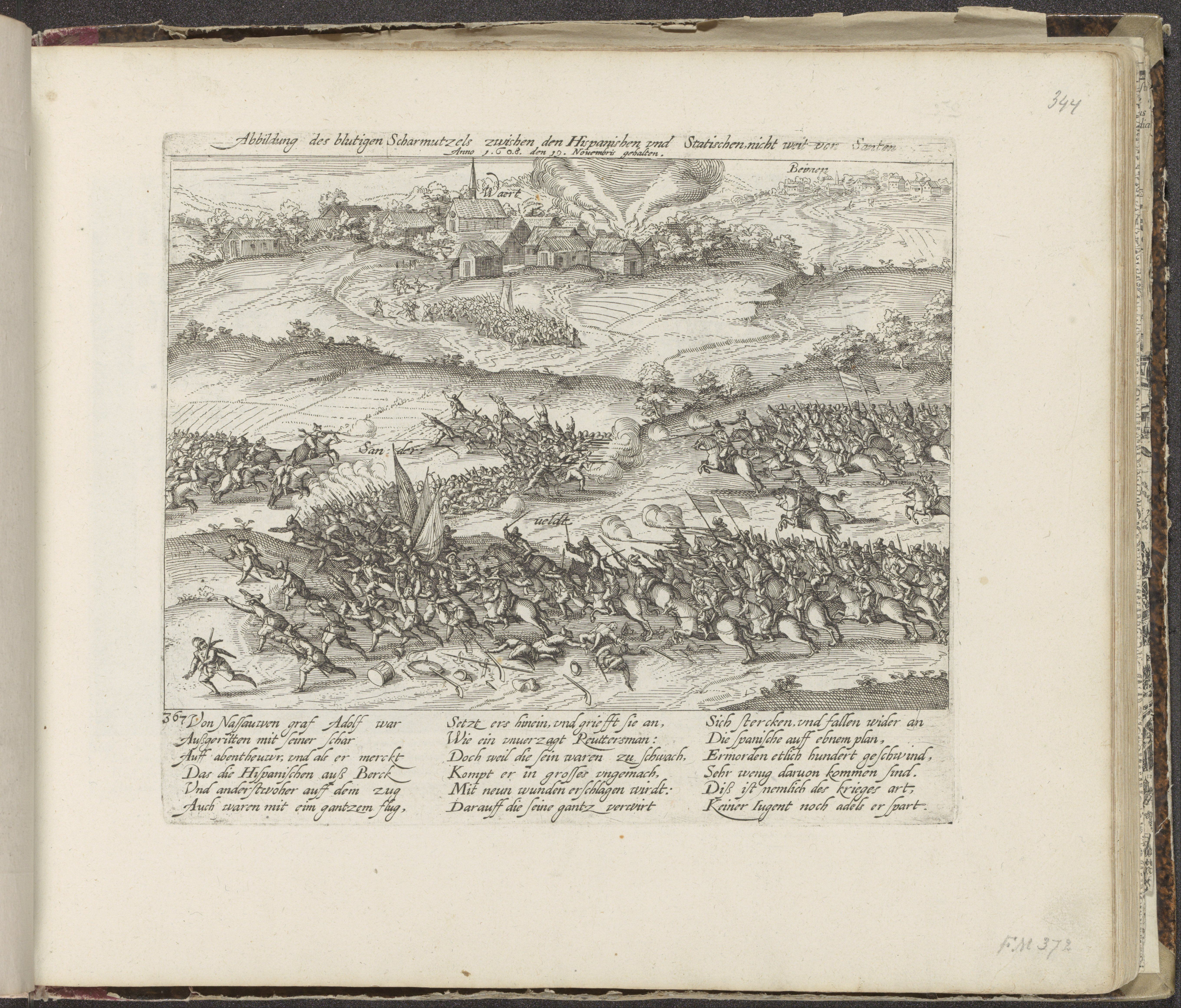
The Battle near Xanten (1608). Print by Frans Hogenberg, 1608–1610. Rijksmuseum Amsterdam.

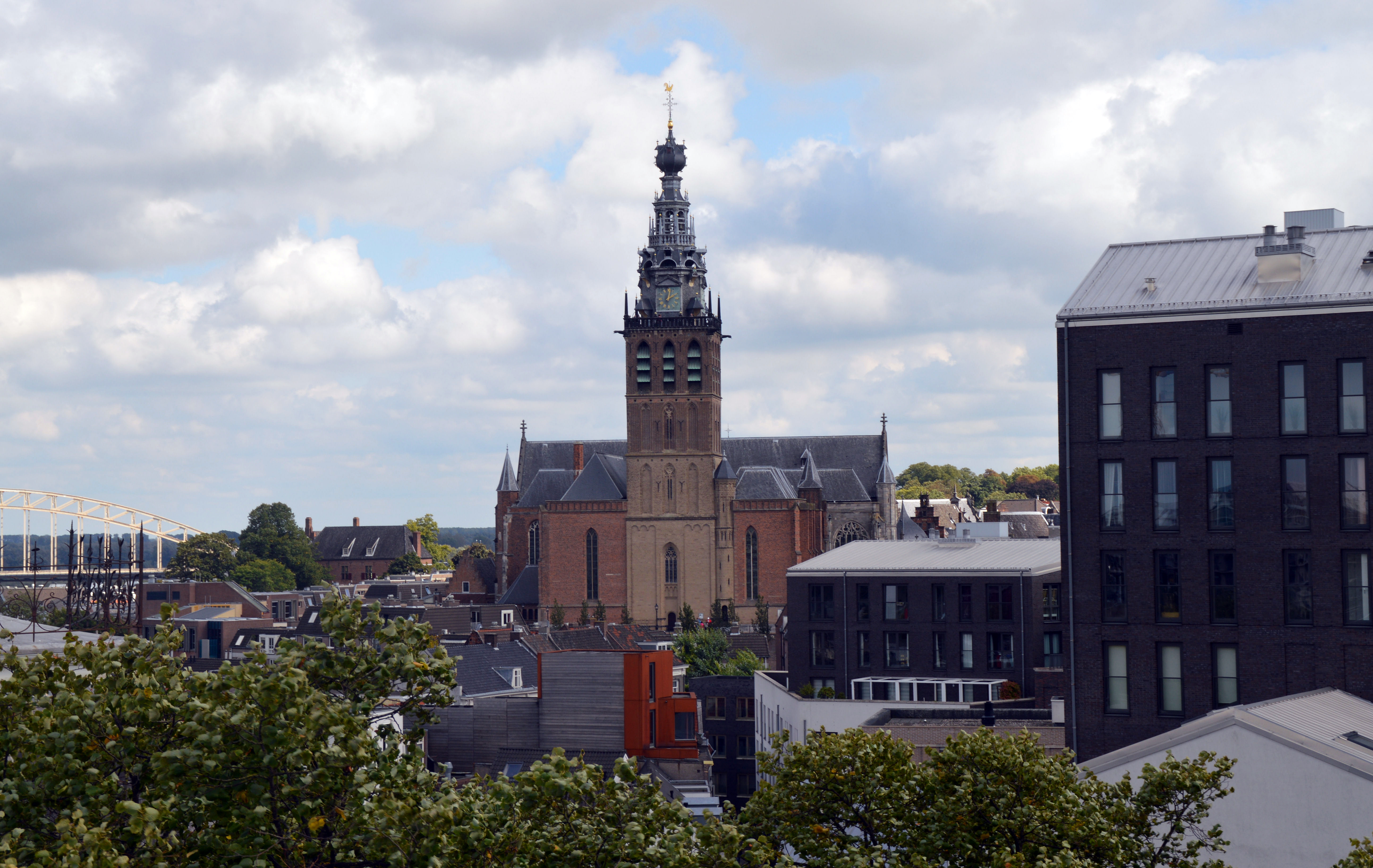
The Saint Stephen's Church in Nijmegen, 2016.

== Ancestors ==
Ancestors of Adolf of Nassau-Siegen
Great-great-grandparents	John V of Nassau-Siegen (1455–1516) ⚭ 1482; Elisabeth of Hesse-Marburg (1466–1523)	Bodo III the Blissful of Stolberg-Wernigerode (1467–1538) ⚭ 1500; Anne of Eppstein-Königstein (1481–1538)	John IV of Leuchtenberg (1470–1531) ⚭ 1502; Margaret of Schwarzburg-Blankenburg (1482–1518)	Frederick I the Elder of Brandenburg-Ansbach (1460–1536) ⚭ 1479; Sophia of Poland (1464–1512)	Philip I of Waldeck-Waldeck (1445–1475) ⚭ 1464; Joanne of Nassau-Siegen (1444–1468)	William of Runkel (d. 1489) ⚭ 1454; Irmgard of Rollingen (d. 1514)	Gerlach II of Isenburg-Grenzau (d. 1500) ⚭ 1455; Hildegard of Sierck (d. 1490)	Henry of Hunolstein-Neumagen (d. 1486) ⚭ 1466; Elisabeth de Boulay (d. 1507)
Great-grandparents	William I the Rich of Nassau-Siegen (1487–1559) ⚭ 1531; Juliane of Stolberg-Wernigerode (1506–1580)		George III of Leuchtenberg (1502–1555) ⚭ 1528; Barbara of Brandenburg-Ansbach (1495–1552)		Henry VIII of Waldeck-Wildungen (1465–1513) ⚭ before 1492; Anastasia of Runkel (d. 1502/03)		Salentin VII of Isenburg-Grenzau (before 1470–1534) ⚭ Elisabeth of Hunolstein-Neumagen (c. 1475–1536/38)	
Grandparents	John VI the Elder of Nassau-Siegen (1536–1606) ⚭ 1559; Elisabeth of Leuchtenberg (1537–1579)				Philip IV of Waldeck-Wildungen (1493–1574) ⚭ 1554; Jutta of Isenburg-Grenzau (d. 1564)			
Parents	John VII the Middle of Nassau-Siegen (1561–1623) ⚭ 1581; Magdalene of Waldeck-Wildungen (1558–1599)							

== Sources ==
- Van der Aa, A.J. (1852). "Adolf van Nassau de Jonge". Biographisch Woordenboek der Nederlanden, bevattende levensbeschrijvingen van zoodanige personen, die zich op eenigerlei wijze in ons vaderland hebben vermaard gemaakt (in Dutch). Vol. Eerste deel. Haarlem: J.J. van Brederode. pp. 78–81.
- Blok, P.J. (1911). "Adolf, de Jonge". In Molhuysen, P.C. & Blok, P.J. (eds.). Nieuw Nederlandsch Biografisch Woordenboek (in Dutch). Vol. Eerste deel. Leiden: A.W. Sijthoff. p. 1222.
- Dek, A.W.E. (1962). Graf Johann der Mittlere von Nassau-Siegen und seine 25 Kinder (in German). Rijswijk: Krips Repro.
- Dek, A.W.E. (1968). "De afstammelingen van Juliana van Stolberg tot aan het jaar van de Vrede van Münster". Spiegel der Historie. Maandblad voor de geschiedenis der Nederlanden (in Dutch). 1968 (7/8): 228–303.
- Dek, A.W.E. (1970). Genealogie van het Vorstenhuis Nassau (in Dutch). Zaltbommel: Europese Bibliotheek.
- Huberty, Michel; Giraud, Alain & Magdelaine, F. & B. (1981). l'Allemagne Dynastique (in French). Vol. Tome III: Brunswick-Nassau-Schwarzbourg. Le Perreux: Alain Giraud. ISBN 2-901138-03-9.
- Lück, Alfred (1981) [1967]. Siegerland und Nederland (in German) (2nd ed.). Siegen: Siegerländer Heimatverein e.V.
- Menk, Friedhelm (1971). Quellen zur Geschichte des Siegerlandes im niederländischen königlichen Hausarchiv (in German). Siegen: Stadt Siegen & Forschungsstelle Siegerland.
- Textor von Haiger, Johann (1617). Nassauische Chronik. In welcher des vralt, hochlöblich, vnd weitberühmten Stamms vom Hause Naßaw, Printzen vnd Graven Genealogi oder Stammbaum: deren geburt, leben, heurath, kinder, zu Friden- vnd Kriegszeiten verzichtete sachen und thaten, absterben, und sonst denckwürdige Geschichten. Sampt einer kurtzen general Nassoviae und special Beschreibung der Graf- und Herschaften Naßaw-Catzenelnbogen, etc (in German). Herborn: Christoph Raab.
- Vorsterman van Oyen, A.A. (1882). Het vorstenhuis Oranje-Nassau. Van de vroegste tijden tot heden (in Dutch). Leiden & Utrecht: A.W. Sijthoff & J.L. Beijers.
