= William, Count of Nassau-Siegen =

German count and field marshal of the Dutch States Army (1592–1642)

Field Marshal William, Count of Nassau-Siegen
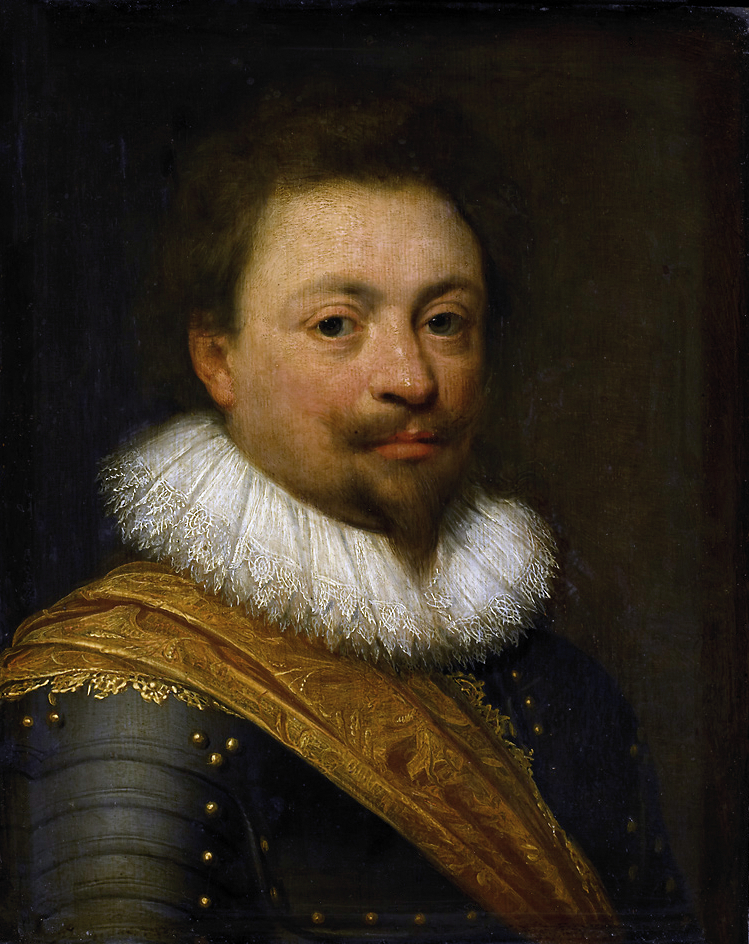
- Count William of Nassau-Siegen (1592–1642); studio of Jan Antonisz. van Ravesteyn, ca. 1620–1630. Rijksmuseum Amsterdam.

Count of Nassau-Siegen
- In office 1624–1642
- Preceded by: John VIII, Count of Nassau-Siegen
- Succeeded by: John Maurice, Prince of Nassau-Siegen

Governor of Emmerich
- In office 1625–1626

Governor of Heusden
- In office 1626–1637

Governor of Sluis
- In office 1637–1642

Personal details
- Born: Wilhelm Graf zu Nassau, Nassau, Katzenelnbogen, Vianden und Diez, Herr zu Beilstein; 13 August 1592 Dillenburg, Germany
- Died: 17 July 1642 (aged 49) Orsoy, Germany
- Cause of death: Died of wounds
- Resting place: Heusden
- Spouse: Christiane of Erbach (1619–his death)
- Children: John William (1619–1623); Maurice Frederick (1621-1638); Mary Magdalene (1622–1647); Ernestine Juliane (1624–1634); Hollandine (1628–1629); Elisabeth Charlotte (1626–1694); Hollandine (1628–1629); Wilhelmine Christine (1629–1700)
- Parent(s): John VII, Count of Nassau-Siegen; Magdalene of Waldeck-Wildungen
- Education: Heidelberg University
- Occupation: Soldier and statesman

Military service
- Allegiance: Hanseatic League; Republic of Venice; Dutch Republic
- Years of service: 1610–1642
- Rank: Field Marshal
- Battles/wars: Uskok War; Eighty Years War; Siege of 's-Hertogenbosch; Capture of Maastricht; Siege of Breda (1637); Battle of Kallo; Siege of Gennep

William, Count of Nassau-Siegen (13 August 1592 – 17 July 1642), German: Wilhelm Graf von Nassau-Siegen, official titles: Graf zu Nassau, Katzenelnbogen, Vianden und Diez, Herr zu Beilstein, was Count of Nassau-Siegen, a part of the County of Nassau from 1624 to 1642. A member of the House of Nassau-Siegen, a cadet branch of the Ottonian Line of the House of Nassau, he was a professional soldier who served in the armies of the Hanseatic League and the Republic of Venice, then with the Dutch States Army during the Eighty Years War. Promoted field marshal in 1633, he was successively governor of Emmerich, Heusden and Sluis.

== Personal details ==
William was born in Dillenburg on 13 August 1592, (Note: "Europäische Stammtafeln says he was born on 12-8-1592, a date confirmed by Dek (1970), with mention of the place of birth. But a notification from the father sent from Siegen of 24 August 1592 (see State Archives Wiesbaden 170^{III}, Korrespondenzen) indicates the date "13 hujus".") the fifth son of Count John VII 'the Middle' of Nassau-Siegen and his first wife, Countess Magdalene of Waldeck-Wildungen. He studied in Heidelberg and then went – along with the later 'Winter King' Frederick of the Palatinate (Note: Frederick of the Palatinate was the eldest son of Countess Louise Juliane of Nassau, the eldest daughter of Prince William I 'the Silent' of Orange and Duchess Charlotte of Bourbon-Montpensier.) – to the court of Henri de La Tour d'Auvergne, (Note: Henri de La Tour d'Auvergne had been married since 1595 to Countess Elisabeth of Nassau, the second daughter of Prince William I 'the Silent' of Orange and Duchess Charlotte of Bourbon-Montpensier.) the Duke of Bouillon, in Sedan. With Landgrave Otto of Hesse-Kassel (Note: Otto was the eldest son of Landgrave Maurice of Hesse-Kassel from his first marriage to Agnes of Solms-Laubach. Maurice remarried in 1603 to William's sister Juliane.) William visited England.

== Career ==
William began his military career in 1610 in his father's army in the Upper Palatinate. In 1615 he was captain in the Army of the Hanseatic League to end the siege of Brunswick. In 1617 he joined his eldest brother John Ernest, who was a general for the Republic of Venice in the Uskok War.

After the end of the Twelve Years' Truce in 1621, William recruited troops for the Dutch Republic in the County of Nassau and entered the Dutch States Army in that same year. He was appointed colonel of the infantry on 24 July 1622, but lived in Siegen until 1625. In 1625 he became governor of Emmerich, then of Heusden from 1626 to 1637. The States of Holland refused on 25 November 1626 to make an exception for William to the rule that no military charges could be accumulated, and the Gecommitteerde Raden of Holland decided on 12 December 1626 not to oppose a proposed increase in William's salary in the States General but to allow it to fade away. At the baptism of his daughter Hollandine in March 1628, the States of Holland were prepared to sponsor, complete with a baptismal gift (which meant they were willing to spend money on an annuity for life).

During the Siege of 's-Hertogenbosch in 1629, William had his headquarters in Orthen, from where 's-Hertogenbosch was first shelled on 15 May. Accompanied by 24 companies of infantry and some cavalry, William was sent to the Bommelerwaard by Prince Frederick Henry of Orange to prevent an invasion by Hendrik Graaf van den Bergh, then commander of the Army of Flanders. In the year 1629, William's salary was £400, equivalent to £89,594 in 2025, per month.

In the winter of 1629–1630, William was sent with his troops east of the Rhine to Cleves, Mark, Jülich and Berg, but without providing sufficient funds. In January 1630, Hendrik van der Capellen, gecommiteerde ter velde (representative of the States General of the Dutch Republic at the Dutch State Army), complained in a letter to Prince Frederick Henry that if the Dutch garrisons of Duisburg and Essen did not receive one month's pay immediately, sy het alsoo ergh als de Keisersche maken sullen (transl. they will make it as bad as the Imperial troops) and cause the citizens to leave those cities. The prince argued in response that it were vrembde maximen (transl. strange maxims) to worry about this, because after all die Landen den Vurst van Nieuburch toebehoorende waeren, ende dat het Volck alleene gesonden was om desen winter aldaer geïnquartiert te worden (transl. the lands belonged to the Prince of Neuburg, and the troops had only been sent to be quartered there this winter). In Soest Walraven van Gendt also complained but the presence of these soldiers forced the Spanish troops to withdraw from Unna, Hamm and Lippstadt, leaving them to the Dutch. In fact, William's troops returned in 1630 after some unrest over their overdue pay, albeit in a rather desolate state.

In 1631 William purchased the heerlijkheid of Poederoijen on the River Meuse. During the March along the Meuse in 1632, William and his troops initially kept an eye on the situation near the front in Zeeland until he was summoned by Prince Frederick Henry of Orange to the Siege of Maastricht in late July. William captured the Kruisschans on the Scheldt and Fort Sint-Anna and other sconces near Antwerp, later Orsoy, in the following year the Sterreschans and those of Philippine in State Flanders. In 1632 William was appointed ritmeester of the cuirassiers and in April 1633 succeeded his uncle Count Ernest Casimir of Nassau-Diez as Field marshal.

In 1636, the strongly defended Schenkenschanz was captured from the Spanish by William and his brother John Maurice. In 1637, William became governor of Sluis and took part in the Siege of Breda; being paid £7000, equivalent to £1,304,740 in 2025, for his service. In support of his planned attack on Antwerp, in 1638 Prince Frederick Henry entrusted William with an important undertaking, the occupation of the levee at Calloo. Having taken the sconces of Stabroek and Calloo and chased off their Spanish defenders, William stopped and awaited reinforcements instead of continuing his march. Receiving false intelligence that a larger Spanish force was approaching, he hastily retreated but was caught and defeated at the Battle of Kallo on 17 June. He lost over 2,000 men, including his son Maurice Frederick, which meant Frederick Henry's entire enterprise failed. During the Siege of Gennep in 1641, William received a musket shot in the abdomen, from which he later succumbed.

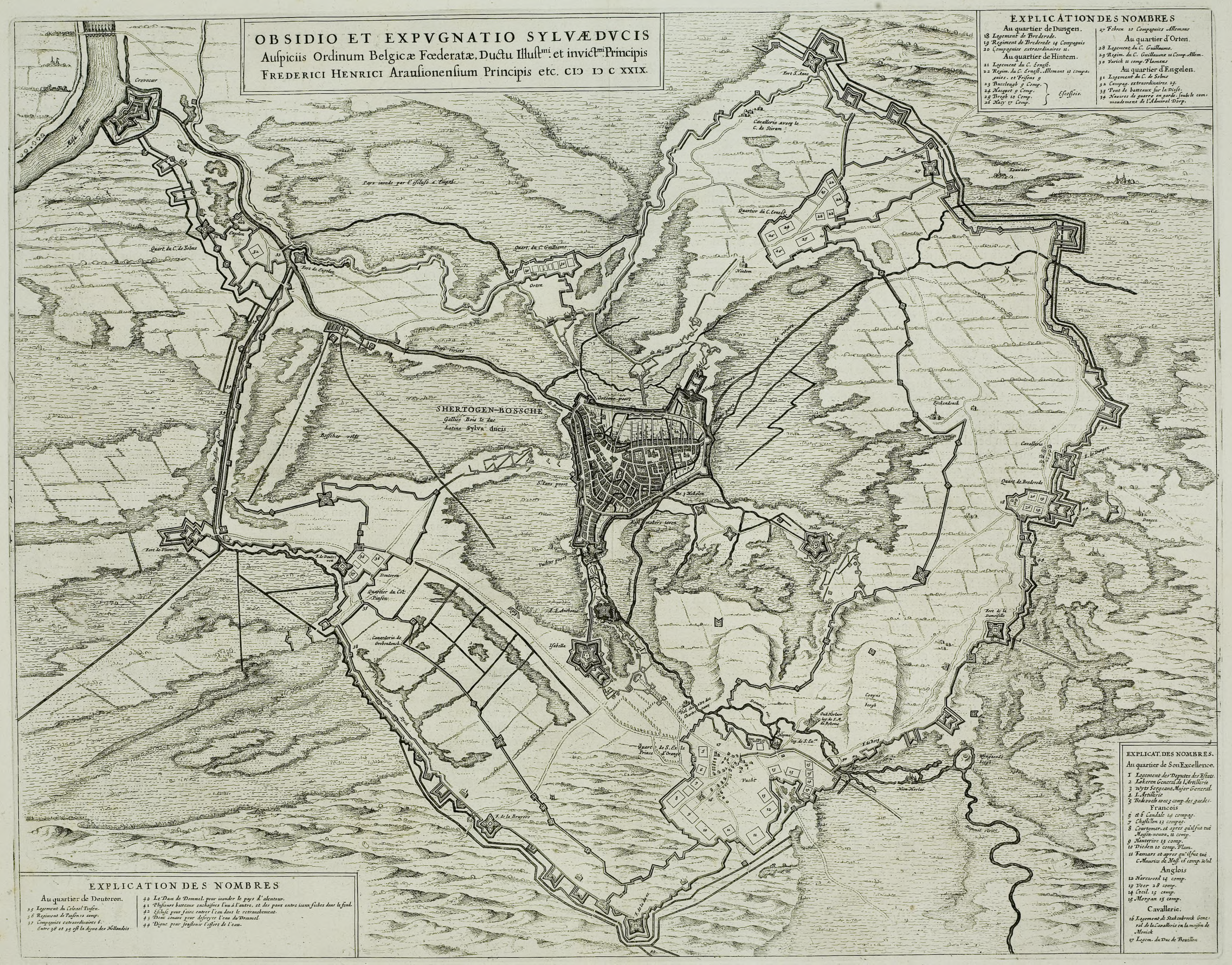
The Siege of 's-Hertogenbosch (1629). Engraving by Joan Blaeu. From Toonneel der Steden van de Vereenighde Nederlanden, Amsterdam, 1649.

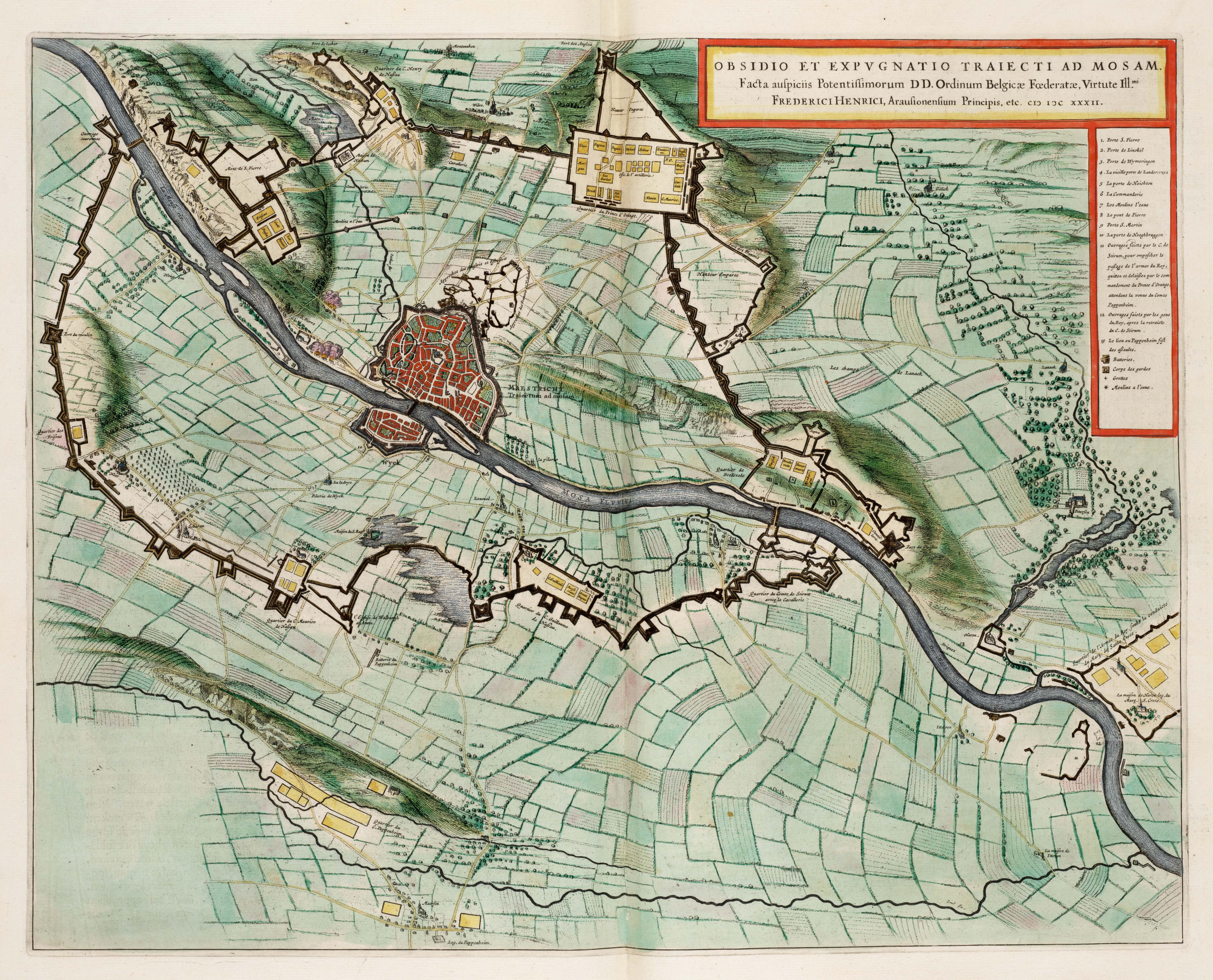
The Siege of Maastricht (1632). From the Atlas van Loon, 1649.

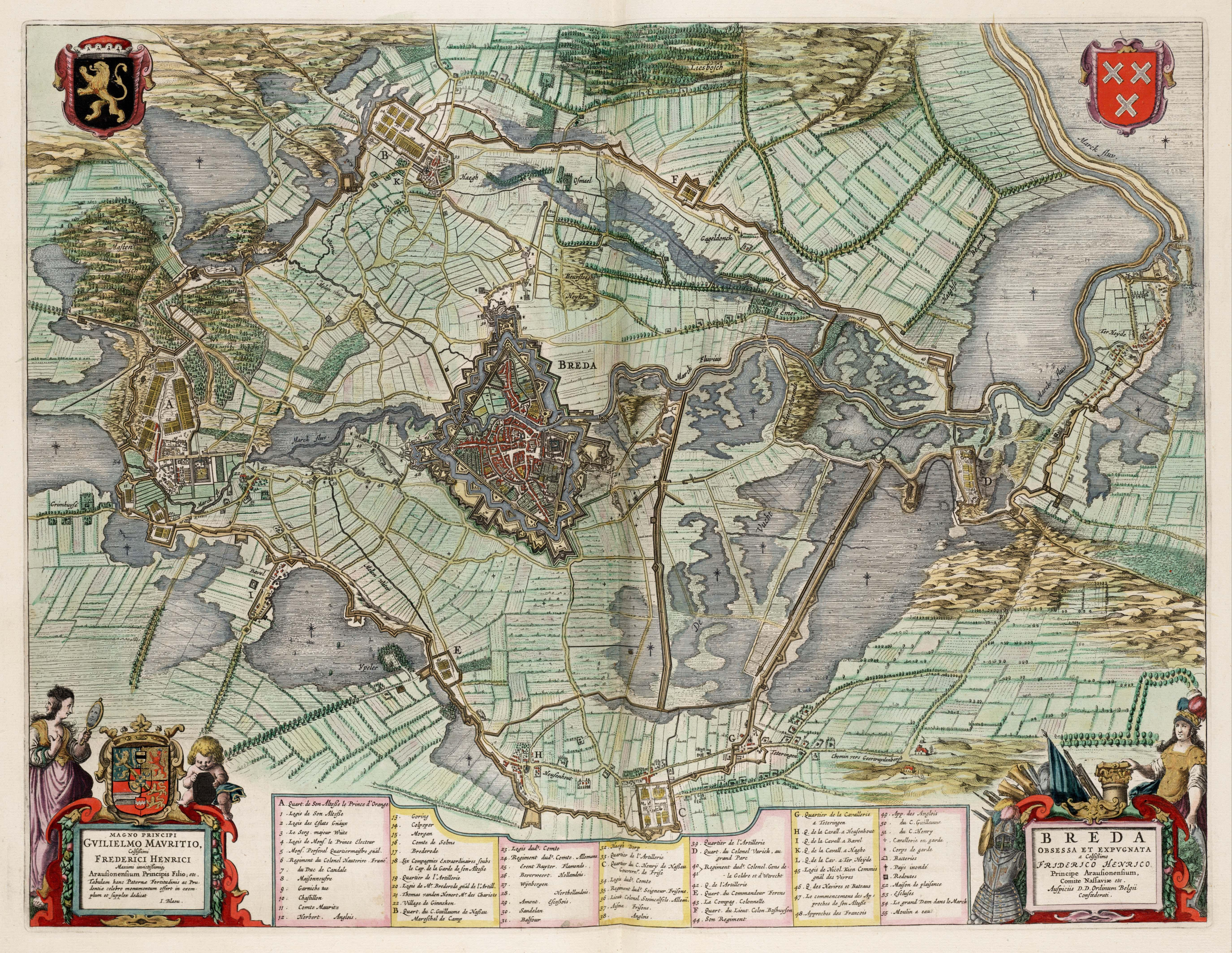
The Siege of Breda (1637). Engraving by Joan Blaeu. From the Atlas van Loon, 1649.

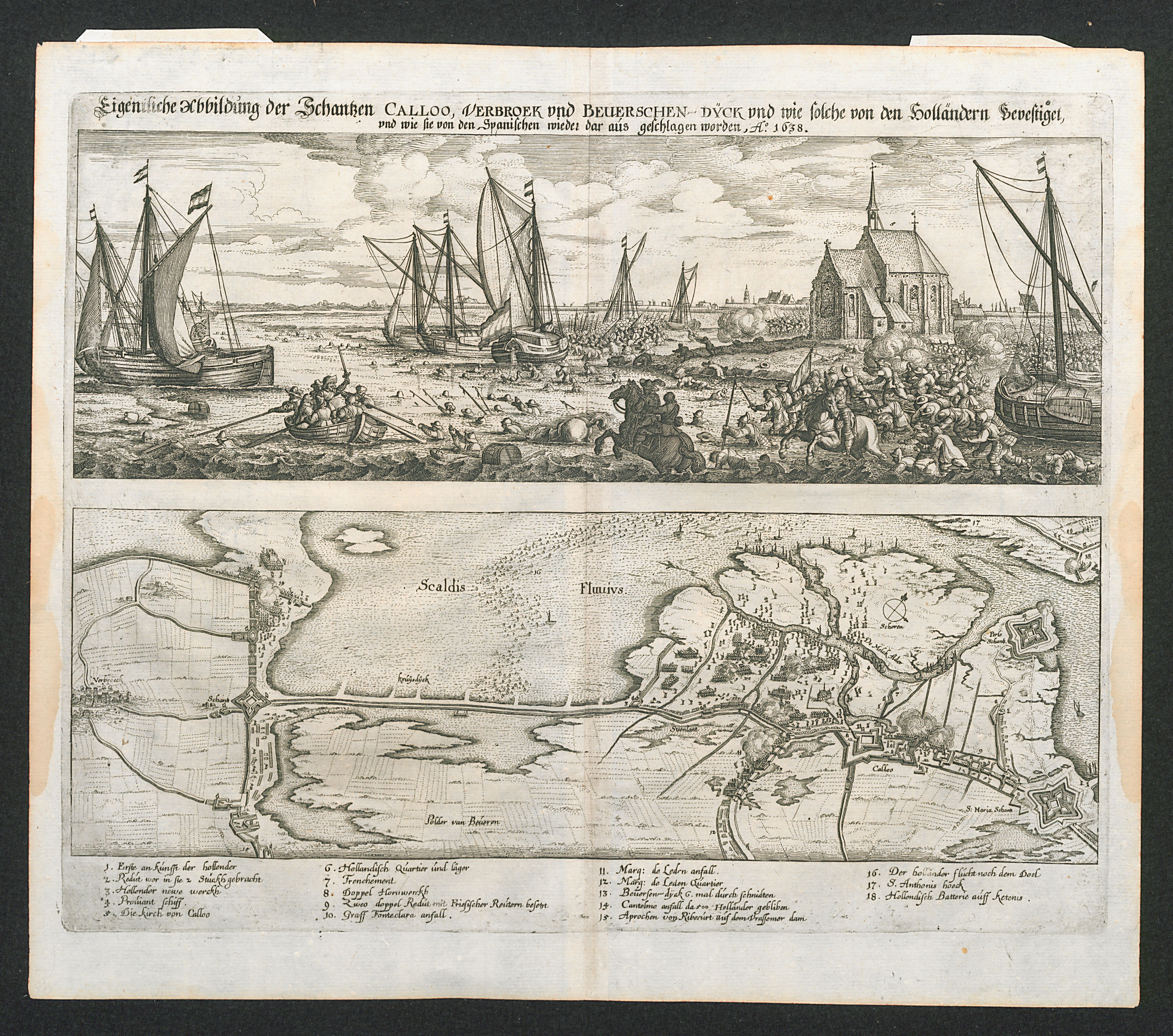
The Battle of Calloo (1638). Anonymous etching, 1638.

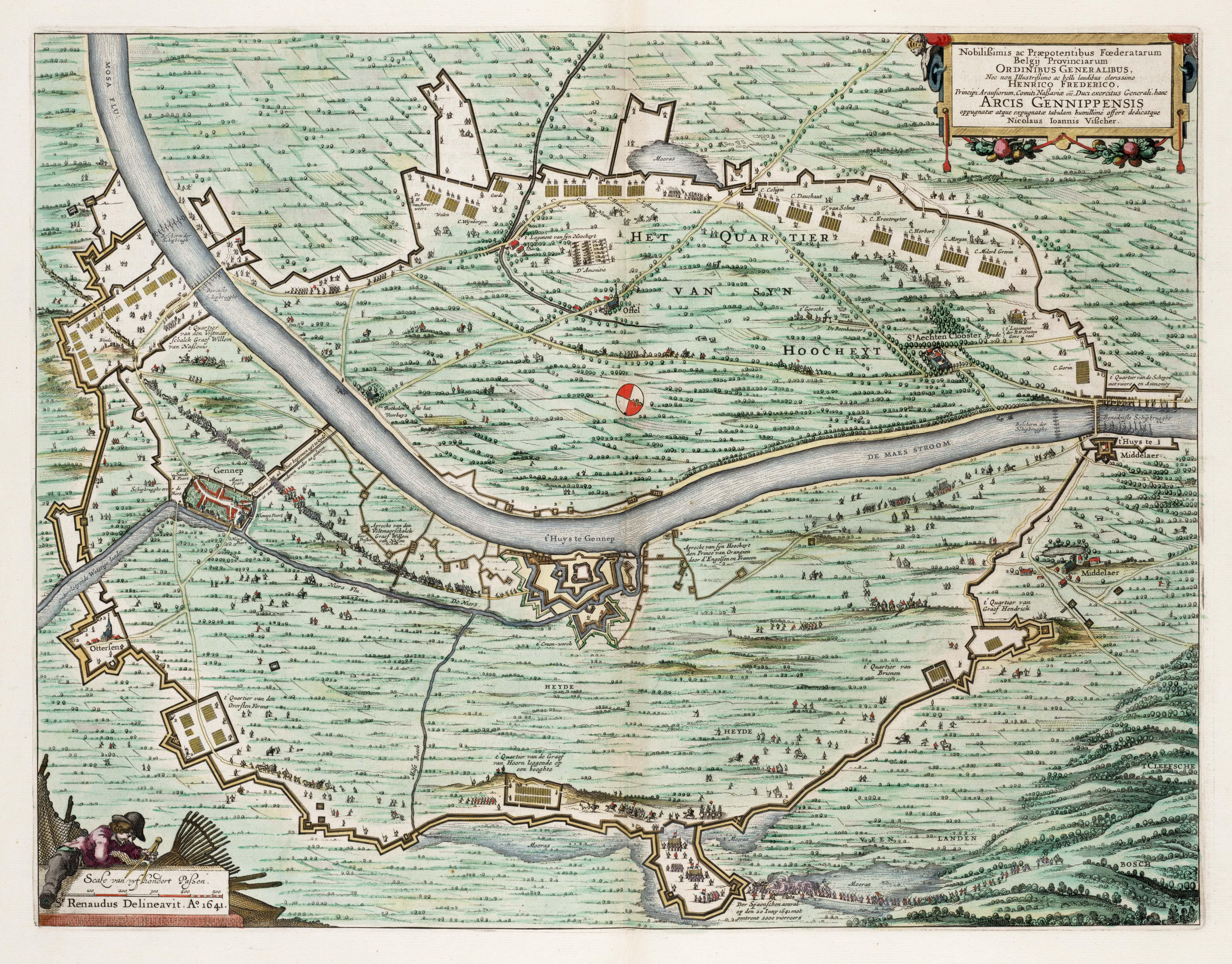
The Siege of Gennep (1641). Engraving by Claes Jansz. Visscher. From the Atlas van Loon, 1649.

=== Count of Nassau-Siegen ===
==== Settlement of the succession by Count John VII 'the Middle' ====
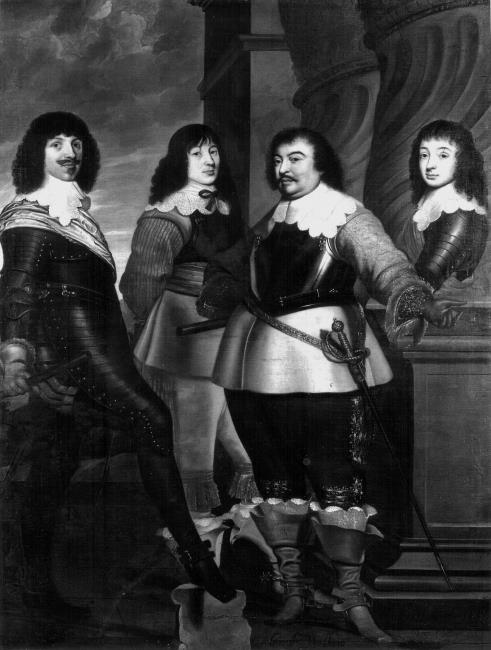
Group portrait of Count William of Nassau-Siegen with his halfbrothers William Otto and Christian and his son Maurice Frederick. Attributed to Wybrand de Geest, 1635–1640. Foundation Historical Collections of the House of Orange-Nassau, The Hague. From left: William Otto, Christian, William, Maurice Frederick.

Because the county of Nassau-Siegen was so small (it had about 9,000 inhabitants and yielded an annual revenue of about 13,000 guilders) William's father John VII 'the Middle' decided that the county should not be divided again. He made a will and testament in 1607, which stated that only the eldest son would rule and the other children should be compensated with money or offices. As one of the most convinced advocates of Protestantism, it was particularly painful for John that his second son, John 'the Younger', converted to the Catholic Church in 1613. In a codicil of 8 October 1613 he explicitly stipulated that his heirs had to keep the land in the Reformed confession. At first, the conversion of John 'the Younger' did not change this house law established by the will, because John Ernest was the eldest son.

To the surprise of his relatives, John 'the Younger' joined the Spaniards in 1617, the opponents of the House of Nassau and the Dutch Republic. In the same year, his older brother John Ernest died in the service of the Republic of Venice. John 'the Middle' had to decide whether an enemy of Nassau and the Netherlands could remain his heir. On 15 November 1617, John declared his will of 8 April 1607 to be null and void. Abolition of the primogeniture would have meant a division of the small country and John opposed all proposals in that direction. In an amicable agreement, he had his son sign a declaration on 31 December 1617, in which the latter declared that, although he remained a Catholic, he would not force his subjects to any other than the existing religious confession. On 22 December 1618 John drew up a second will, which promulgated the promises of his son as a condition and still held on to the primogeniture. He imposed the penalty of disinheritance on the introduction of 'papism'.

Why John 'the Middle' still distrusted his son, in spite of the latter's confirmations, cannot be fully elucidated. Maybe it was because John 'the Younger' loudly proclaimed that no power in the world could prevent him from succeeding in Nassau-Siegen, because the power of the Emperor and the King of Spain was behind him. Perhaps John 'the Middle' also knew the influence of the de Ligne family and the Catholic clergy on his son. It is certain that such rumours were conveyed to him from all sides and that his relatives and other Protestant estates of the realm warned him again and again about his son. Only when John 'the Middle' was convinced that his son was under the influence of the Jesuits and that the possibility of a Catholic area within the Nassau lands was a danger to the Protestant inhabitants, was he persuaded to make a new will. On 3 July 1621 John 'the Middle' drew up a third will, in which he laid down that the small county of Nassau-Siegen, which was barely able to support one lord, was to be split into three parts. His three eldest sons, John 'the Younger', William and John Maurice, were to receive one third each. The administration of the city of Siegen would remain in joint ownership.

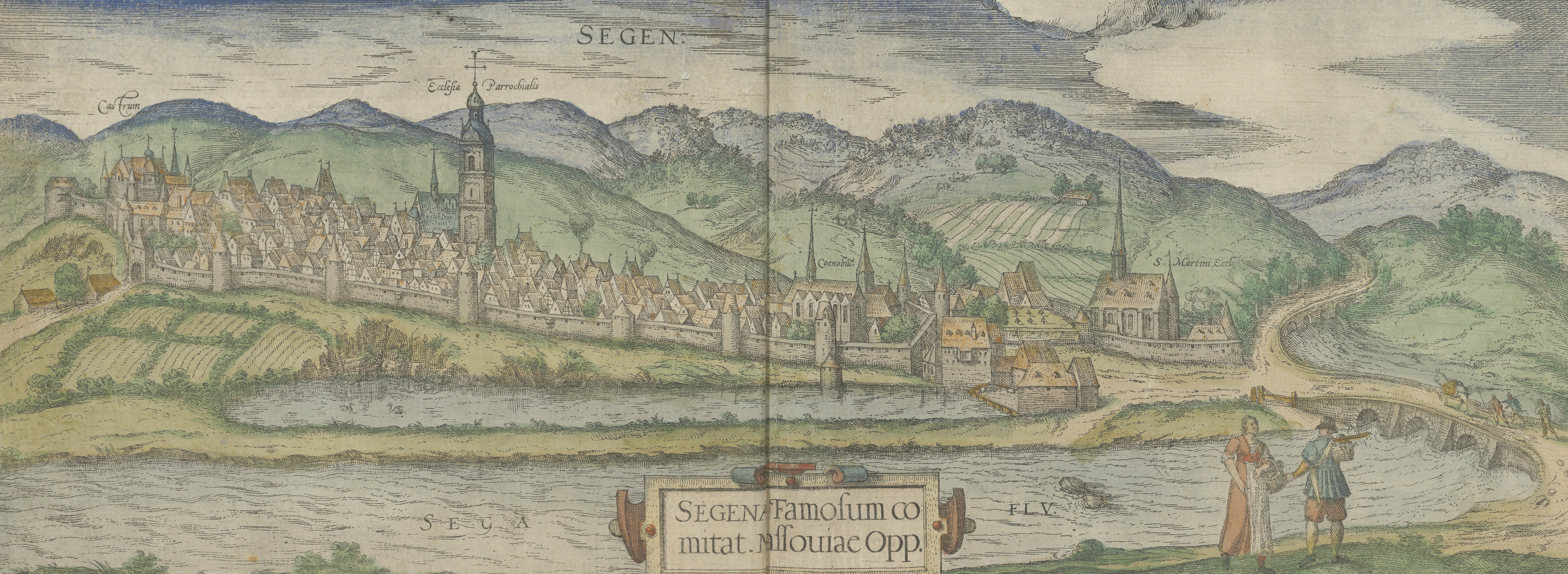
Siegen in 1617. From Braun & Hogenberg, Civitates orbis terrarum Band 6, Cologne, 1617. On the left Siegen Castle.

For John 'the Younger', only one third of the county was provided for in the third will. On 6 August 1621, he was informed of this, with a statement of the reasons that had led his father to take this step. On 9 May 1623, i.e. not until two years later, John 'the Younger' protested against this with a letter from Frankfurt to the councillors of Siegen. He had not been idle and had not hesitated to denounce his father to the Emperor. At the time of his letter of protest he was certainly already aware of the Poenale mandatum cassatorium, which Emperor Ferdinand II officially issued some time later, on 27 June 1623, informing John 'the Middle' that at the time of making his third will as a fellow combatant of the outlawed Winter King he was not entitled to make a will. He had to revoke it and answer to an imperial court within two months. It seems that John 'the Younger' then shrank from having the imperial decree delivered to his seriously ill father. John 'the Middle' died at Siegen Castle on 27 September 1623. None of the three sons mentioned in the will were present at the death of their father. On 13 October William and John Maurice arrived in Siegen, and on 26 October John 'the Younger'.

==== Succession dispute ====
Everyone knew that there would be a dispute at the reading of the will on 11 December 1623. John 'the Younger' had the imperial decree read out and when his brothers demurred, he said as he stood up 'Der Kaiser wird uns scheiden!' ('The Emperor will part us!'). He had taken the precaution of obtaining a further imperial decree on 20 November 1623 against Countess Dowager Margaret and her sons, in which the Emperor strictly forbade impeding John's assumption of government, his taking possession of the land and his inauguration. On 12 January 1624, John 'the Younger' was able to accept the homage from the town of Siegen but only because he had secretly let a squadron of selected horsemen into the town through the castle gate (that is, not through a city gate) in a heavy snowstorm, so that they could not be seen or heard by the town guards.

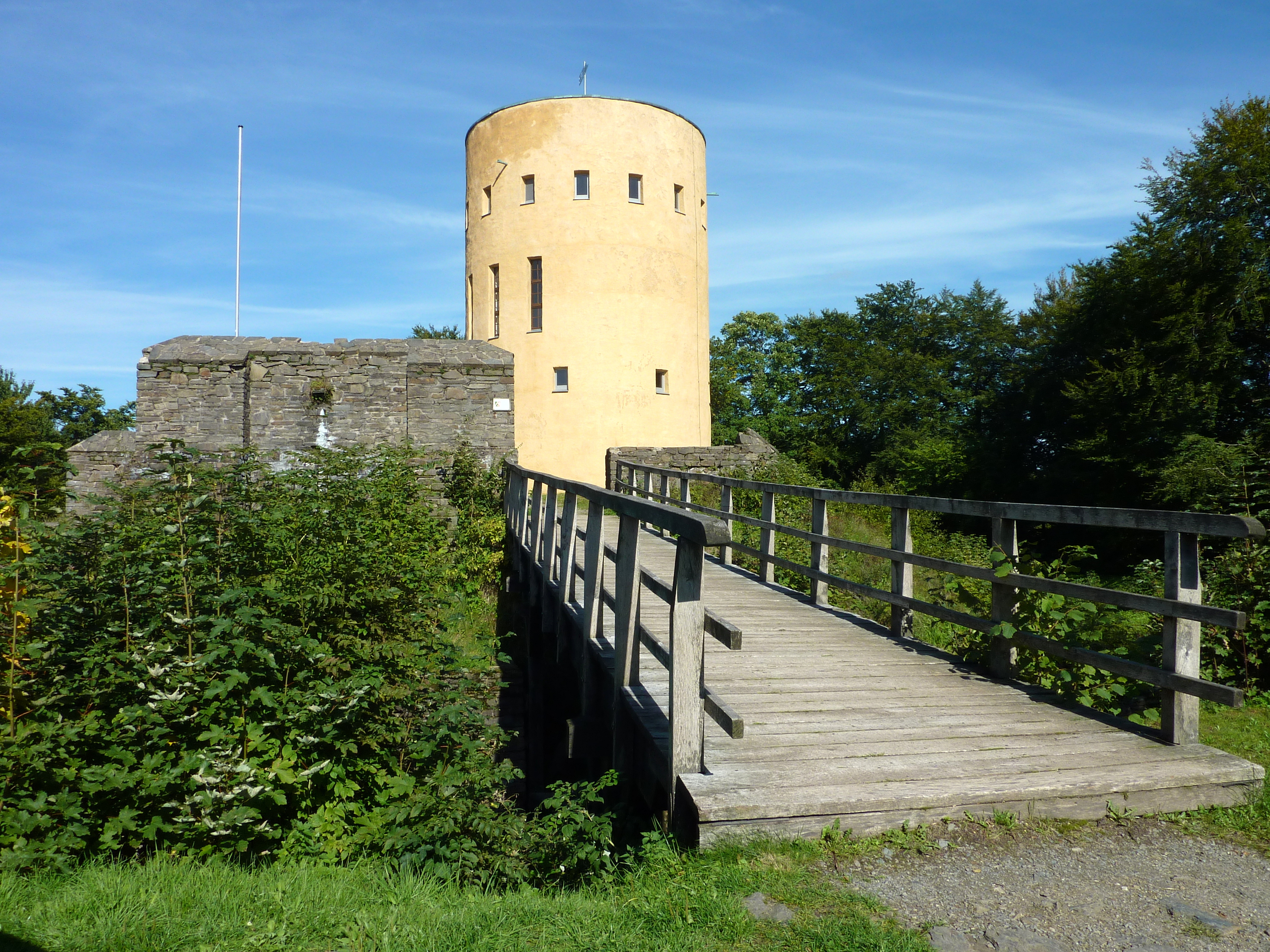
Ginsburg Castle. Photo: Frank Behnsen, 2010.

John 'the Younger' received the entire inheritance, and the provisions of the will made in favour of William and John Maurice remained a dead letter. On 13/23 January 1624, John 'the Younger' voluntarily ceded the sovereignty over the Hilchenbach district with Ginsburg Castle and some villages belonging to the Ferndorf and Netphen districts, to William. With the exception of John Maurice and George Frederick, the younger brothers accepted only modest appanages. Henceforth, until 1645, the county of Nassau-Siegen had two governments, one in Siegen, the other in Hilchenbach. For a short period (1632–1635) this situation underwent a temporary change, during the Thirty Years' War, his brothers, who were fighting on the Protestant side, rebelled against John 'the Younger'.

Count Louis Henry of Nassau-Dillenburg entered the service of King Gustavus II Adolphus of Sweden on 1 December 1631, who had landed in Germany on 24 June 1630 to intervene in favour of the Protestants in the Thirty Years' War. Countess Dowager Margaret, through the mediation of Louis Henry, turned to Gustavus Adolphus and asked for help against the machinations of her stepson John 'the Younger'. On 14 February 1632 the Swedish king sent an order from Frankfurt to Louis Henry to provide military support for his first cousin John Maurice. Louis Henry then occupied the city of Siegen with his regiment of Dutch and Swedish soldiers. One day later, on 29 February, John Maurice and his brother Henry arrived in Siegen. Just as John 'the Younger' had kept his cavalry in reserve eight years earlier, now John Maurice and Henry, supported by the presence of the Swedish regiment, negotiated with the citizens, who felt bound by the oath they had sworn to John 'the Younger'.

On 4 March, after long and difficult negotiations, the citizens paid homage to John Maurice and Henry. John Maurice obtained for himself not only the Freudenberg district, which his father had intended for him in the will of 1621, but also Netphen, which had been intended for John 'the Younger' in the same will. William was confirmed in the possession of Hilchenbach and received Ferndorf and Krombach, as stipulated in his father's will. The city of Siegen paid homage only to William and John Maurice, who only in 1635 re-admitted their elder brother John 'the Younger' into co-sovereignty. The latter soon restored the old order: in 1636, he again became the sole owner of his father's property, with the exception of Hilchenbach, which he left to William and he again governed the city of Siegen alone. John Maurice was again excluded from the county's sovereignty.

=== Death, burial and succession ===
William died at Orsoy on 7/17 July 1642 (Note: "See Menk (1967), p. 57. The author establishes that the death took place in Orsoy (Lower Rhine) on Thursday 7/17 July 1642, between one and two o'clock in the afternoon, and bases himself on the documents found in the Royal House Archive of the Netherlands (IV, 1444): a notification addressed to the widow from Orsoy on 7/17 July 1642 («heute den 7/17 disses ...») and an death announcement from a priest from Kampen («Donnerstag, den 7/17 juli 1642 zwischen 1 u. 2 Uhr nachmittags zu Orsoy ...»).") and was buried at Heusden on 24 July 1642. He left his part of the county of Nassau-Siegen to his half-brother John Maurice. As field marshal of the Dutch States Army, he was succeeded by his brother-in-law Johan Wolfert van Brederode.

== Marriage and issue ==
William married at Siegen Castle on 17 January 1619 (Note: "The marriage is said to have taken place on 20-8-1616, according to Europäische Stammtafeln. Dek (1970) is closer to the truth when he puts forward the date of 16-1-1619 (without place). It is in fact on 17-1-1619 that the ceremony on the occasion of the baptism of John Ernest was celebrated, which had taken place on 10-1, old style, in Siegen (see State Archives Wiesbaden 170^{III}: Count Ernst Casimir of Nassau-Diez answers to his brother John 'the Middle' of Nassau-Siegen about the marriage that followed the recent baptism in Siegen «auf nächstabgewichener Kindstauf zu Siegen mit dem Fraulein zu Erbach sein hochzeitliches Beilager gehalten»). See also Royal House Archive of the Netherlands (4/1591 II): John 'the Middle' writes on 2‑1‑1619 in Siegen to his daughter Juliane with the request to arrive on the evening of the 16th to attend William's wedding on the 17th. On 3-1-1619, William personally requests the Landgrave of Hesse-Kassel to arrive on the 16th in the evening to attend his wedding that would take place «den 17 dieses allhier». It is the marriage contract that was signed on the 16th, in Siegen.") to Countess Christiane of Erbach (5 June 1596 – Culemborg, 6 July 1646 (Note: "See Dek (1962). On the other hand, her daughter Mary Magdalene reports from Culemborg on 9-7-1646 that the death took place «auf den 1 huius des Vormittags um zehn Uhr».")), daughter of Count George III of Erbach and Countess Mary of Barby and Mühlingen. From this marriage the following children were born:

1. John William (Siegen Castle, 28 October 1619 (Note: "Europäische Stammtafeln and Dek (1970) write that he was born on 23-1-1620, which is absolutely incorrect: see State Archives Marburg 115, 2, 340, a notification addressed to the brother from Siegen on 29-10-1619: «diese vergangene Nacht». A document attached to his death notification also confirms this: «gebohren den 28ten 8ber intra 9 et 10».") – Siegen Castle, 25 August 1623^{Jul.} (Note: "See State Archives Marburg (115, Waldeck, 2). A notification dated Siegen 25-8-1623 announces the death «gestrigen Sonntags (or Montags, the first letter, corrected, is illegible) zu morgen», which does not seem to correspond to the statement of the genealogists (Europäische Stammtafeln, Dek (1970), etc.) which indicate that he died on the 25th. But attached to this notification is a document stating that the child died on 25 August «intra 4 et 5». Therefore, it must be assumed that the author of the notification made a mistake, which he tried to correct by changing one letter of the word, as mentioned above. Since it is a Sunday or a Monday on the one hand, and 25-8 on the other, only the date Monday 25-8-1623 old style is acceptable. According to the new style, 25-8 fell on a Friday and 24 on a Thursday.")).
2. Maurice Frederick (Siegen Castle, 19 January 1621 (Note: "Dek (1970) and Europäische Stammtafeln give the date 20-1, but a notification of the birth (see State Archives Marburg 115, 2, 340) dated Siegen 19-1-1621 mentions that the birth took place «heute dato».") – Calloo, 17 June 1638), was a captain in the Dutch States Army, was killed in the Battle of Calloo.
3. Mary Magdalene (Siegen Castle, 21 October 1622 (Note: "Born on the 26th in Europäische Stammtafeln and Dek (1970), but a notification of birth, dated Siegen 1-11-1622, says: «jüngsthin den 21. abgelaufenen Monats 8bris». The place of birth must therefore be Siegen, where the parents lived until 1625 (see Menk (1967)). The inscription on the coffin reads: «nata XX Octobris MDCXXII ad fontes spadanos» (i.e. Spa, sic!). See Leiss (1928), p. 108.") – Spa, 20/30 August 1647 (Note: "See State Archives Wiesbaden (130^{II} 7826), notification of death, Spa 20/30‑8‑1647: «heut früe umb halbvier Uhr, alhir zu Spa».")), married in Culemborg on 25 August 1639 to Count Philip Theodore of Waldeck-Eisenberg (2 November 1614 – Korbach, 7 December 1645).
4. Ernestine Juliane (Siegen, 17/27 July 1624 – Heusden, 9 July 1634). (Note: "This young countess is not mentioned in any printed genealogy. However, she is mentioned in a handwritten family tree, which is kept in the Royal House Archive of the Netherlands. The places and dates mentioned are confirmed by official notifications (see State Archives Marburg 115, 2, 340). In the notification of the birth, sent from Siegen on 23-7-1624, it says that the event took place «Samssdagth den 17/27 hujus».")
5. Elisabeth Charlotte (Emmerich, 11 March 1626 (Note: "Born on 11-2-1626 at Europäische Stammtafeln I, 117; on 8-2-1626 at Europäische Stammtafeln I, 139 and on 11-3-1626 at Dek (1970). The latter date is confirmed by a notification preserved in the State Archives Marburg (115, Waldeck, 2) and dated Emmerich 12-3-1626: «gestriges tagks umb zwo Uhren vormittags».") – Culemborg, 16 November 1694^{Jul.} (Note: "See State Archives Wiesbaden (130^{II} 2183): notification of death «allhier den 16. dieses früh morgens zwischen 3 und 4 Uhr». The notification is dated Culemborg, unfortunately the date of dispatch is difficult to read: 10/20 or 18/28, making it impossible to establish the style of the death date with certainty. Hoffmeister (1883) wrongly claims it is the new style. There is in fact another notification (kept in the State Archives Karlsruhe Abt. 47 Nr. 1410) dated Culemborg 18-11 and stating that the Fürstin died «den 16/26 dieses früh morgens zw. 3 u. 4 Uhr». Therefore, it is 16 o.s.")), married in Culemborg on 29 November/9 December 1643 (Note: "See State Archives Wiesbaden (170^{III}), invitation from Culemborg 24-11-1643 for the wedding that will be celebrated «nächtskommenden Mittwoch den 29 November alten Kalenders auf meinem Hause». See the princely archives in Schloss Wittgenstein, F. 320 III, notification dated Culemborg 4-12-1643: «am verschienen Mittwoch 29. Novembris».") to Fürst George Frederick of Waldeck-Eisenberg (Arolsen, 31 January 1620^{Jul.} – Arolsen, 9 November 1692^{Jul.}).
6. Hollandine (Heusden, 2 March 1628 (Note: "See Dek (1962), p. 83 and 118 (with reproduction of the notification of birth). See also notification of birth in State Archives Marburg (115, Waldeck, 2)." Strangely enough, Dek (1968), p. 276 and Dek (1970), p. 88 mention the date 6 March 1628.) – Heusden, 14 October 1629 (Note: "See notification of death in State Archives Marburg (115, Waldeck, 2).")).
7. Wilhelmine Christine (1629 (Note: "She was certainly not born in 1625, as Europäische Stammtafeln claims. She was baptised in Heusden on 10-6-1629 and probably born there. However, it should be noted that William of Nassau-Siegen notified the birth of his daughter on 31-5-1629 from Ortheim (See: State Archives Wiesbaden 170^{III}).") – Hildburghausen, 22 January 1700 (Note: "Died on 21-1-1700 according to Europäische Stammtafeln I, 117; on 22-1-1707 according to Europäische Stammtafeln I, 139 and Hoffmeister (1883), confirmed by Dek (1970), with Saalfeld as place of death. But the death does not occur in the parish registers of Saalfeld, neither in January 1700 nor in January 1707. Saalfeld must be excluded as a possible place of death. Waldeckischer Helden – und Regenten – Saal, a manuscript written in 1737 by the Geheimrat August von Klettenburg and preserved in the State Archives Marburg, mentions that the Fürstin died at Cuylenborg in Holland on 21-1-1700. It is possible that she was mistaken for her sister-in-law Juliane Elisabeth, who was called «Gräfin Cülenborg» and died in 1707, which seems to be a cause of the mistake for some authors who, as we have seen, have the Fürstin die in that year. Finally, in the book Bau und Kunstdenkmäler, Kreis der Eder is claimed that she died in Altwillungen Castle. None of these claims are true. The death certificate can be found in the parish registry of Hildburghausen, Stadtkirche, part I, p. 475 R, year 1700: «Die Hochgeb. Gräfin u. Frau Wilhelmine Christina Verwittibte Gräfin zu Waldeck Wildungen, gebohrene Gräfin zu Nassau usw. wird aus diesem Hochfürstl. Residence Schlosse, den 22. January seelig Entschlafen, den 27, abendts umb 7 Uhr in Hochansehentlichen Leichenprocess von hier auf bis vors thor Begleithet, und so ferner auf Saaltfeld gebracht worden.»")), married at Arolsen Castle on 26 January 1660 (Note: "Dek (1970): married in Helsen, suburb of Arolsen 26-1-1660. This is a misinterpretation of the marriage certificate. One does indeed find in the Helsen parish records, the marriage certificate, but in this one it says: «1660 den 26 Januar ist der Hochgeborene Graff und Herr, Herr Josias Graff zu Waldeck u. Piermont ... mit der Hochgebohrenen Gräfinnen Frewlein Wilhelmine Christina, Frewlein von Nassau, Catzenelnbogen, Vianden u. Diez, uff Arolsen abends umb 7 Uhren copulirt worden». One finds the date 26‑1‑1659 in Europäische Stammtafeln I, 117.") to Count Josias II of Waldeck-Wildungen (Wildungen, 31 July 1636 – Kandia, 8 August 1669).

One of the daughters from this marriage was engaged to Count Crato of Nassau-Saarbrücken.

Maurice Frederick of Nassau-Siegen (1621–1638). Detail of a painting attributed to Wybrand de Geest, 1635–1640. Foundation Historical Collections of the House of Orange-Nassau, The Hague.

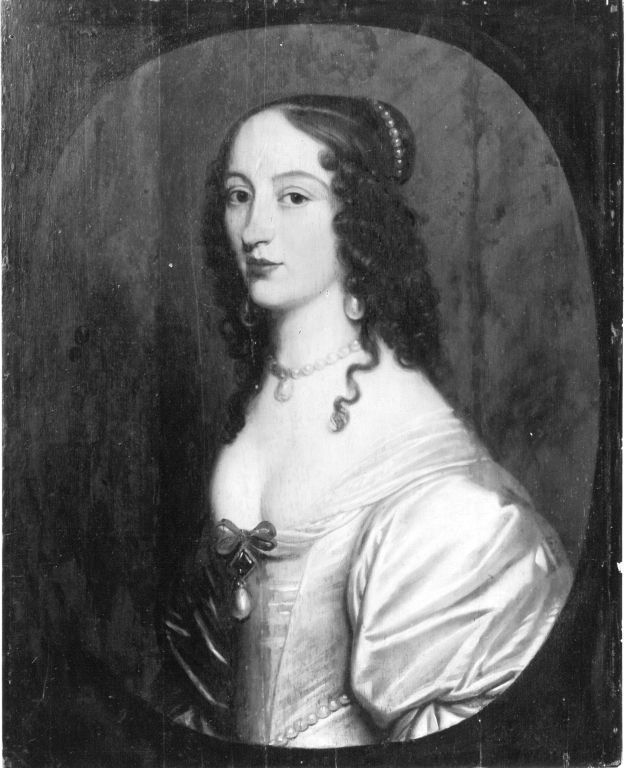
Mary Magdalene of Nassau-Siegen (1622–1647). Portrait by Gerard van Honthorst, ca. 1639–1647. Bavarian State Painting Collections, Munich.

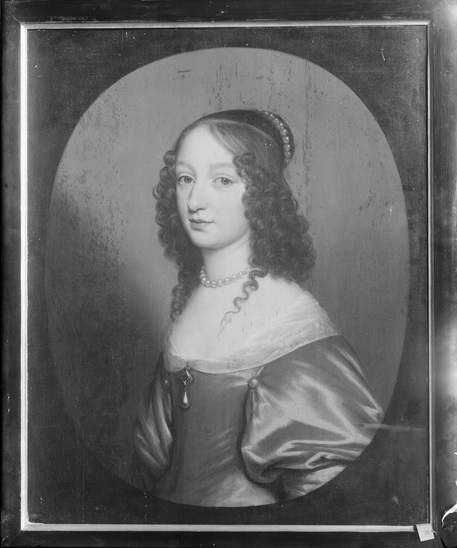
Wilhelmine Christine of Nassau-Siegen (1629–1700). Portrait by Gerard van Honthorst, ca. 1640. Foundation Historical Collections of the House of Orange-Nassau, The Hague.

=== Known descendants ===
William has several known descendants. Among them are:

- the German Emperors Wilhelm I, Frederick III and Wilhelm II,
- the monarchs George IV, William IV, Victoria, Edward VII, George V, Edward VIII, George VI, Elizabeth II and Charles III of the United Kingdom,
- the kings Leopold I, Leopold II, Albert I, Leopold III, Baudouin I, Albert II and Philippe I of the Belgians.
- the tsars Ferdinand I, Boris III and Simeon II of Bulgaria.
- the kings Ferdinand II, Pedro V, Luís I, Carlos I and Manuel II of Portugal,
- the grand dukes Adolph I, William IV, Marie-Adélaïde, Charlotte, Jean I and Henri I of Luxembourg,
- the Romanian writer Carmen Sylva.

== Ancestors ==
Ancestors of Count William of Nassau-Siegen
Great-great-grandparents	John V of Nassau-Siegen (1455–1516) ⚭ 1482; Elisabeth of Hesse-Marburg (1466–1523)	Bodo III 'the Blissful' of Stolberg-Wernigerode (1467–1538) ⚭ 1500; Anne of Eppstein-Königstein (1481–1538)	John IV of Leuchtenberg (1470–1531) ⚭ 1502; Margaret of Schwarzburg-Blankenburg (1482–1518)	Frederick V 'the Elder' of Brandenburg-Ansbach (1460–1536) ⚭ 1479; Sophia of Poland (1464–1512)	Philip I of Waldeck-Waldeck (1445–1475) ⚭ 1464; Joanne of Nassau-Siegen (1444–1468)	William of Runkel (?–1489) ⚭ 1454; Irmgard of Rollingen (?–1514)	Gerlach II of Isenburg-Grenzau (?–1500) ⚭ 1455; Hildegard of Sierck (?–1490)	Henry of Hunolstein-Neumagen (?–1486) ⚭ 1466; Elisabeth de Boulay (?–1507)
Great-grandparents	William I 'the Rich' of Nassau-Siegen (1487–1559) ⚭ 1531; Juliane of Stolberg-Wernigerode (1506–1580)		George III of Leuchtenberg (1502–1555) ⚭ 1528; Barbara of Brandenburg-Ansbach (1495–1552)		Henry VIII of Waldeck-Wildungen (1465–1513) ⚭ before 1492; Anastasia of Runkel (?–1502/03)		Salentin VII of Isenburg-Grenzau (before 1470–1534) ⚭ Elisabeth of Hunolstein-Neumagen (c. 1475–1536/38)	
Grandparents	John VI 'the Elder' of Nassau-Siegen (1536–1606) ⚭ 1559; Elisabeth of Leuchtenberg (1537–1579)				Philip IV of Waldeck-Wildungen (1493–1574) ⚭ 1554; Jutta of Isenburg-Grenzau (?–1564)			
Parents	John VII 'the Middle' of Nassau-Siegen (1561–1623) ⚭ 1581; Magdalene of Waldeck-Wildungen (1558–1599)							

== Sources ==
- Aa, A.J. van der (1877). "Willem graaf van Nassau". Biographisch Woordenboek der Nederlanden, bevattende levensbeschrijvingen van zoodanige personen, die zich op eenigerlei wijze in ons vaderland hebben vermaard gemaakt (in Dutch). Vol. Twintigste deel. Haarlem: J.J. van Brederode. pp. 269–270.
- Aßmann, Helmut; Menk, Friedhelm (1996). Auf den Spuren von Nassau und Oranien in Siegen (in German). Siegen: Gesellschaft für Stadtmarketing Siegen e.V.
- Bastiaensen, Jean (1999). Prins Filip & Prinses Mathilde. Twee families met geschiedenis (in Dutch). Leuven: Uitgeverij Van Halewyck. ISBN 90-5617-262-X.
- Behr, Kamill (1854). Genealogie der in Europa regierenden Fürstenhäuser (in German). Leipzig: Verlag von Bernhard Tauchnitz.
- Blok, P.J. (1911). "Willem, Wilhelm". In: Molhuysen, P.C. en Blok, P.J. (redactie), Nieuw Nederlandsch Biografisch Woordenboek (in Dutch). Vol. Eerste deel. Leiden: A.W. Sijthoff. p. 1572.
- Dek, A.W.E. (1962). Graf Johann der Mittlere von Nassau-Siegen und seine 25 Kinder (in German). Rijswijk: Krips Repro.
- Dek, A.W.E. (1968). "De afstammelingen van Juliana van Stolberg tot aan het jaar van de Vrede van Münster". Spiegel der Historie. Maandblad voor de geschiedenis der Nederlanden (in Dutch). 1968 (7/8): 228–303.
- Dek, A.W.E. (1970). Genealogie van het Vorstenhuis Nassau (in Dutch). Zaltbommel: Europese Bibliotheek.
- Ehrenkrook, Hans Friedrich von; Förster, Karl; Marchtaler, Kurt Erhard (1928). Ahnenreihen aus allen deutschen Gauen. Beilage zum Archiv für Sippenforschung und allen verwandten Gebieten (in German). Görlitz: Verlag für Sippenforschung und Wappenkunde C.A. Starke.
- Haarmann, Torsten (2014). Das Haus Waldeck und Pyrmont. Mehr als 900 Jahre Gesamtgeschichte mit Stammfolge. Deutsche Fürstenhäuser (in German). Vol. Heft 35. Werl: Börde-Verlag. ISBN 978-3-981-4458-2-4.
- Hoffmeister, Jacob Christoph Carl (1883). Historisch-genealogisches Handbuch über alle Grafen und Fürsten von Waldeck und Pyrmont seit 1228 (in German). Cassel: Verlag Gustav Klaunig.
- Huberty, Michel; Giraud, Alain; Magdelaine, F. & B. (1976). l'Allemagne Dynastique (in French). Vol. Tome I: Hesse-Reuss-Saxe. Le Perreux: Alain Giraud.
- Huberty, Michel; Giraud, Alain; Magdelaine, F. & B. (1981). l'Allemagne Dynastique (in French). Vol. Tome III: Brunswick-Nassau-Schwarzbourg. Le Perreux: Alain Giraud.
- Huberty, Michel; Giraud, Alain; Magdelaine, F. & B. (1987). l'Allemagne Dynastique (in French). Vol. Tome V: Hohenzollern-Waldeck-Familles alliées A-B. Le Perreux-sur-Marne: Alain Giraud.
- Koenhein, A.J.M.; Heniger, J. (1999). "Johan Wolfert van Brederode 1599–1655 – ʻIn Opbloey neergetoghenʼ". In: Koenhein, A.J.M. e.a. (red.), Johan Wolfert van Brederode 1599–1655. Een Hollands edelman tussen Nassau en Oranje (in Dutch). Vianen: Historische Vereniging Het Land van Brederode/Zutphen: Uitgeversmaatschappij Walburg Pers. p. 9–46. ISBN 90-5730-034-6.
- Kooijmans, Luuc (2000). Liefde in opdracht. Het hofleven van Willem Frederik van Nassau (in Dutch). Amsterdam: Uitgeverij Bert Bakker. ISBN 90-351-2201-1.
- Leiss, Albert (1928). "Die gräflich und fürstlich waldeckischen Begräbnisstätten zu Corbach". Geschichtsblätter für Waldeck und Pyrmont (in German). Vol. Band XXV. pp. 98–114.
- Lück, Alfred (1981) [1967]. Siegerland und Nederland (in German) (2nd ed.). Siegen: Siegerländer Heimatverein e.V.
- Menk, Friedhelm (1967). "Wilhelm Graf zu Nassau-Siegen (1592–1642)". Siegerland (in German). Band XLIV (Heft 2): 53–59.
- Menk, Friedhelm (1971). Quellen zur Geschichte des Siegerlandes im niederländischen königlichen Hausarchiv (in German). Siegen: Stadt Siegen/Forschungsstelle Siegerland.
- Menk, Friedhelm (1979). "Johann Moritz Fürst zu Nassau-Siegen". Siegerland (in German). Band LVI (Heft 1–2): 1vv.
- Menk, Gerhard (1992). Georg Friedrich von Waldeck 1620–1692. Eine biographische Skizze. Waldeckische Historische Hefte (in German). Vol. Band 3. Arolsen: Waldeckischer Geschichtsverein e.V. ISBN 3-9802226-5-9.
- Muller, P.L. (1898). "Wilhelm (Graf von Nassau-Siegen und Dillenburg)". Allgemeine Deutsche Biographie (in German). Vol. Band 43. Leipzig: Duncker & Humblot. p. 133.
- Poelhekke, J.J. (1978). Frederik Hendrik, Prins van Oranje. Een biografisch drieluik (PDF) (in Dutch). Zutphen: De Walburg Pers. ISBN 90-6011-443-4.
- Schutte, O. (1979). "Genealogische gegevens". In: Tamse, C.A. (red.), Nassau en Oranje in de Nederlandse geschiedenis (in Dutch). Alphen aan den Rijn: A.W. Sijthoff. p. 40–44, 224–228. ISBN 90-218-2447-7.
- Spielmann, Christian (1909). Geschichte von Nassau (Land und Haus) von den ältesten Zeiten bis zur Gegenwart (in German). Vol. Teil 1. Politische Geschichten. Wiesbaden: P. Plauen.
- Textor von Haiger, Johann (1617). Nassauische Chronik (in German). Herborn: Christoph Raab.
- Vorsterman van Oyen, A.A. (1882). Het vorstenhuis Oranje-Nassau. Van de vroegste tijden tot heden (in Dutch). Leiden: A.W. Sijthoff/Utrecht: J.L. Beijers.

William, Count of Nassau-Siegen House of Nassau-Siegen (protestant branch) Born: 13 August 1592 Died: 7/17 July 1642
Preceded by John VIII 'the Younger'	Count of Nassau-Siegen; 13/23 January 1624 – 7/17 July 1642	Succeeded by John Maurice
Vacant Title last held by Ernest Casimir of Nassau-Diez	Field marshal of the Dutch States Army; April 1633 – 7/17 July 1642	Vacant Title next held by Johan Wolfert van Brederode
