= John Ernest of Nassau-Siegen (1582–1617) =

German count and general of the Republic of Venice (1582–1617)

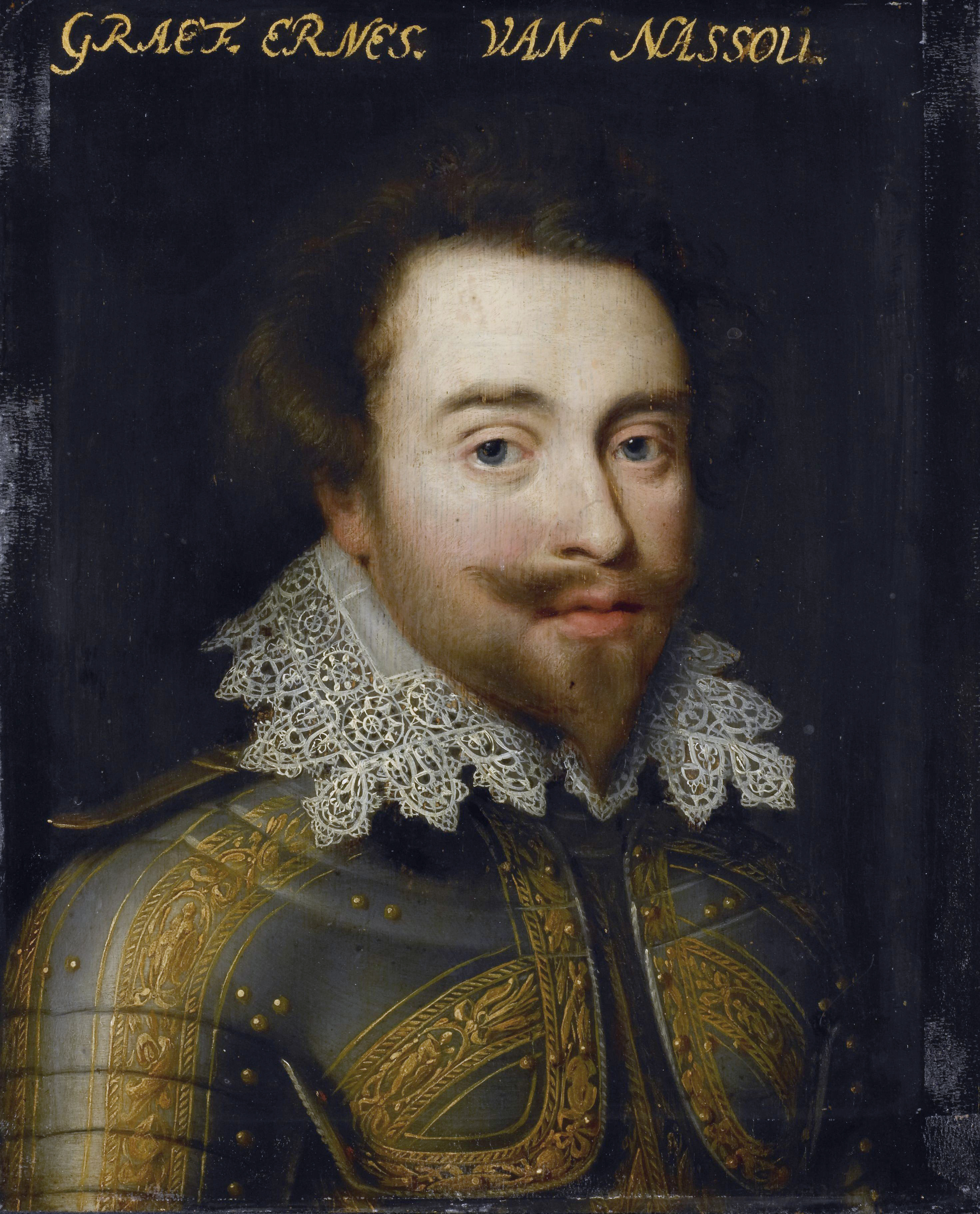
- Hereditary Count John Ernst of Nassau-Siegen. Studio of Jan Antonisz. van Ravesteyn, c. 1609–1633. Rijksmuseum Amsterdam.

- Coat of arms
- Full name: John Ernest Hereditary Count of Nassau-Siegen
- Native name: Johann Ernst Erbgraf von Nassau-Siegen
- Born: Johann Ernst Graf zu Nassau, Katzenelnbogen, Vianden und Diez, Herr zu Beilstein; 21 October 1582^{Jul.} Siegen Castle
- Died: 16/17 September 1617^{Jul.} Udine
- Buried: 19 April 1618; St. Nicholas Church, Siegen; Reburied: 29 April 1690; Fürstengruft, Siegen
- Noble family: House of Nassau-Siegen
- Spouse: –
- Issue: –
- Father: John VII the Middle of Nassau-Siegen
- Mother: Magdalene of Waldeck-Wildungen
- Occupation: Colonel in the Dutch States Army; General in the Republic of Venice

Hereditary Count John Ernest of Nassau-Siegen (21 October 1582^{Jul.} – 16/17 September 1617^{Jul.}), German: Johann Ernst Erbgraf von Nassau-Siegen, official titles: Graf zu Nassau, Katzenelnbogen, Vianden und Diez, Herr zu Beilstein, was since 1607 Hereditary Count of Nassau-Siegen, a part of the County of Nassau. He descended from the House of Nassau-Siegen, a cadet branch of the Ottonian Line of the House of Nassau. He first served as an officer in the Dutch States Army and later as general in the Republic of Venice during the Uskok War.

== Biography ==
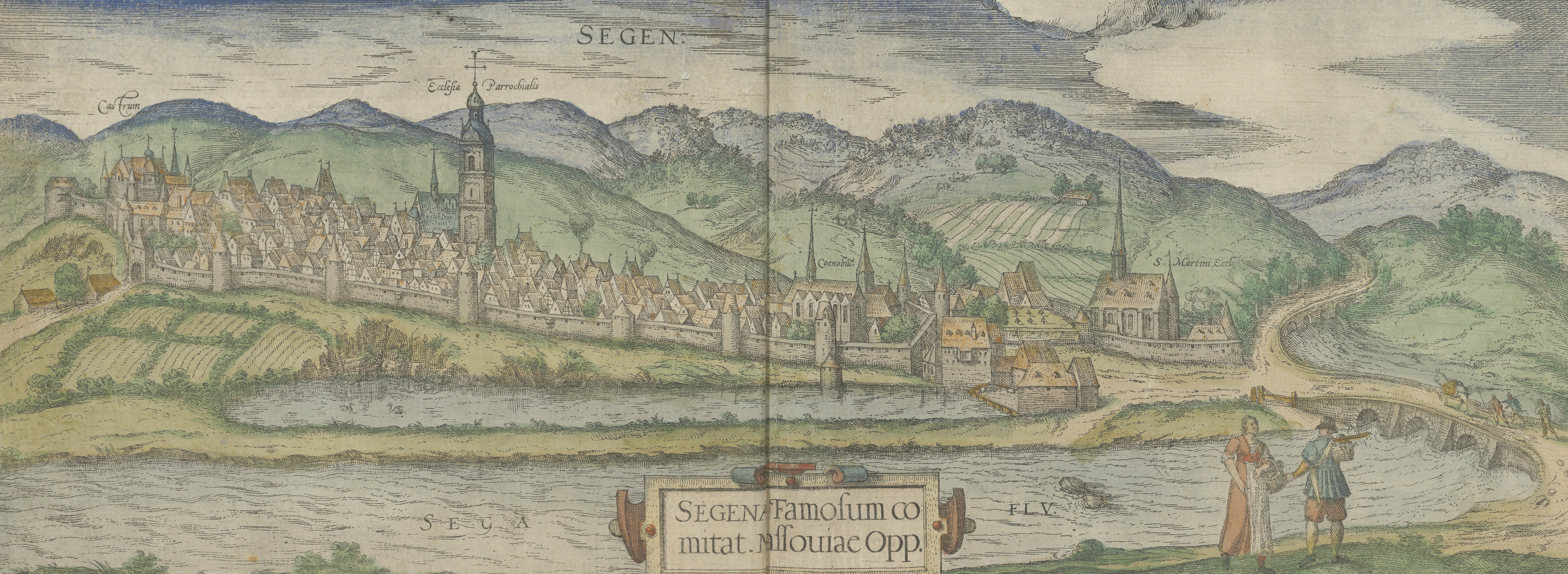
Siegen in 1617. From Braun & Hogenberg, Civitates orbis terrarum Band 6, Cologne, 1617. On the left Siegen Castle.

John Ernest was born at Siegen Castle on 21 October 1582^{Jul.}, (Note: "Dek (1962) and Dek (1968) write that he was born at Dillenburg Castle, but Dek (1970) corrects this and gives Siegen as place of birth, which is confirmed by Menk (1971), p. 18. Dek (1962) indicates as date of birth Sunday 21-10-1582, which corresponds with the Julian calendar.") the eldest son of Count John VII the Middle of Nassau-Siegen and his first wife, Countess Magdalene of Waldeck-Wildungen. John Ernest studied in Kassel in 1595, and then in Geneva. He later stayed with his uncle William Louis of Nassau-Dillenburg in Leeuwarden.

=== In the Dutch States Army ===
John Ernest served in the Dutch States Army under Maurice of Nassau since 1601, where he took part in the Siege of Ostend. Later, he served as a hopman in the regiment of his uncle Ernest Casimir of Nassau-Diez. From May to July 1603 he took part in the special envoy to London to congratulate King James I of England on his accession to the throne. The envoy also included Frederick Henry of Nassau, grand pensionary Johan van Oldenbarnevelt, Walraven III van Brederode and the regent Jacob Valcke from Zeeland. At the first audience, a comical misunderstanding occurred when John Ernest was mistaken for Frederick Henry by James I. John Ernest was appointed captain on 22 September 1603. At the Siege of Sluis in 1604 he was shot in the leg. On 6 May 1606 he was appointed colonel of the regiment Walloons.

John Ernest and his younger brothers Adolf and John the Younger had the reputation of being gamblers and of showing a completely unseemly splendour in their clothes and appearance. Their father wrote letters to the young counts, full of fatherly admonitions, exhorting them to be thrifty, because he did not know what to do with his worries and debts. In a letter of 8 December 1608 he even considered the death of Adolf as a punishment from God and he exhorted the two others, who with "einem ärgerlichen Leben mit Verschwendung fast allem, was ich in der Welt habe, durch Ehebrechen und Hurerei, Plünderung und Beraubung armer, unschuldiger Leute hoch und niederen Standen" ("an annoying life of squandering almost everything I have in the world, through adultery and fornication, plundering and robbing poor, innocent people of high and low rank") ruined the county of Nassau-Siegen, to lead a different, better life, worthy of the name Nassau.

John Ernest took part in the Siege of Jülich in 1610 with Maurice of Nassau, (Note: When the reigning dynasty of Jülich-Cleves-Berg became extinct on 25 March 1609 with Duke John William of Jülich-Cleves-Berg, the heirs fought a succession war, which lasted until 1614 and is known as the War of the Jülich Succession (German: Jülich-Klevischer Erbfolgestreit).) where he was appointed second-in-command. In 1615 he took part in Frederick Henry of Nassau's march to the Hansa city of Brunswick, which was in conflict with Duke Frederick Ulrich of Brunswick-Wolfenbüttel and besieged by him. The Dutch States Army crossed neutral territory – especially the Bishopric of Münster – to relieve the besieged city. It did not come to an armed encounter; when Frederick Henry arrived at Schlüsselberg by the Weser, Frederick Ulrich broke up the siege. John Ernest's father then managed to negotiate an agreement between the Duke and the city.

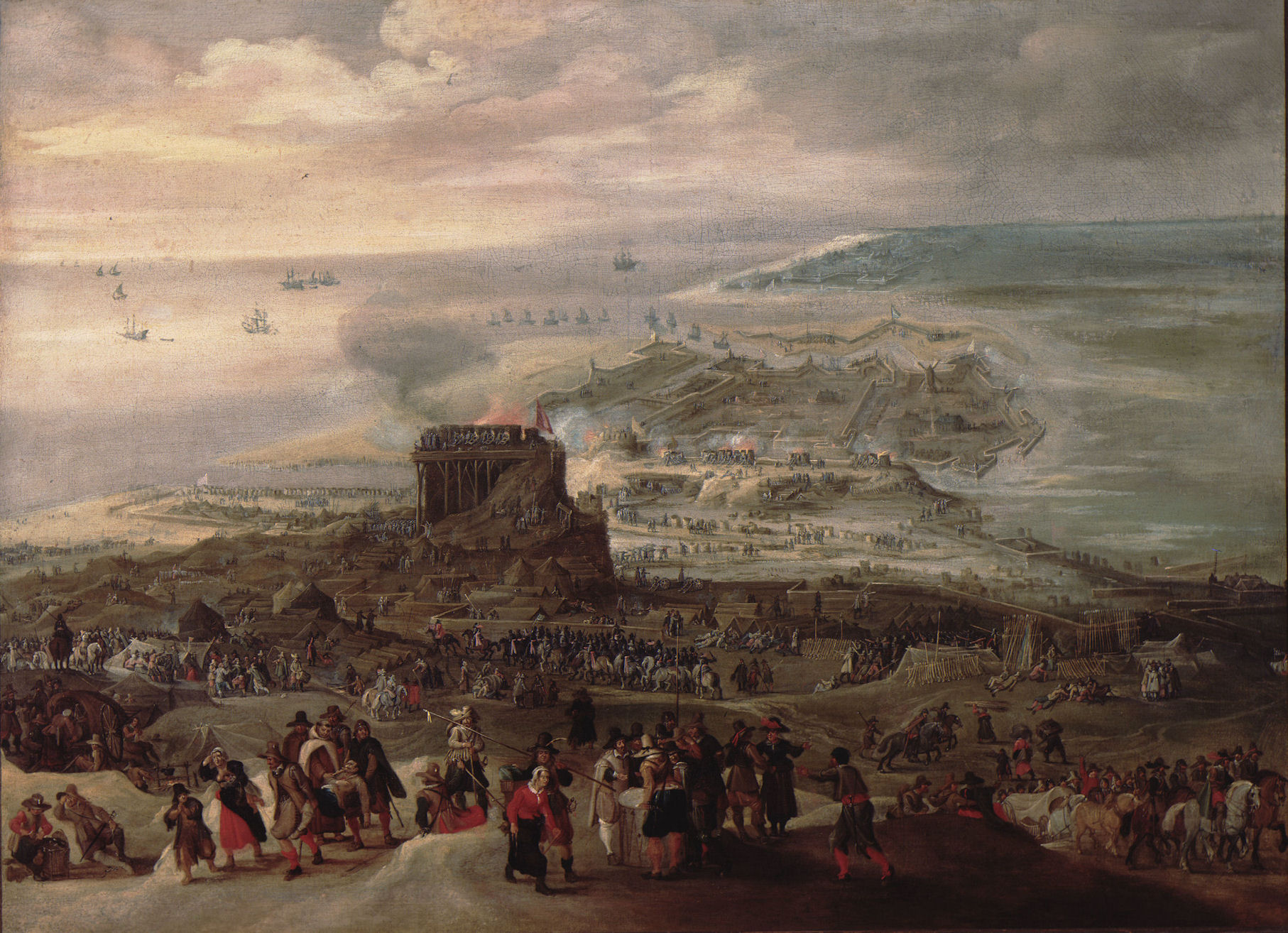
The Siege of Ostend (1601–1604). Painting by Peter Snayers, 17th century. Museum Het Prinsenhof, Delft.

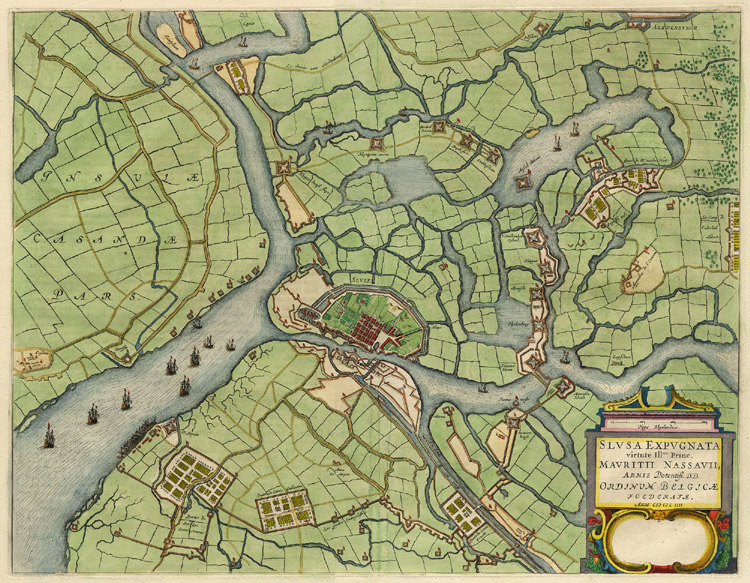
The Siege of Sluis (1604). By Joan Blaeu, 1649. From the Atlas van Loon.

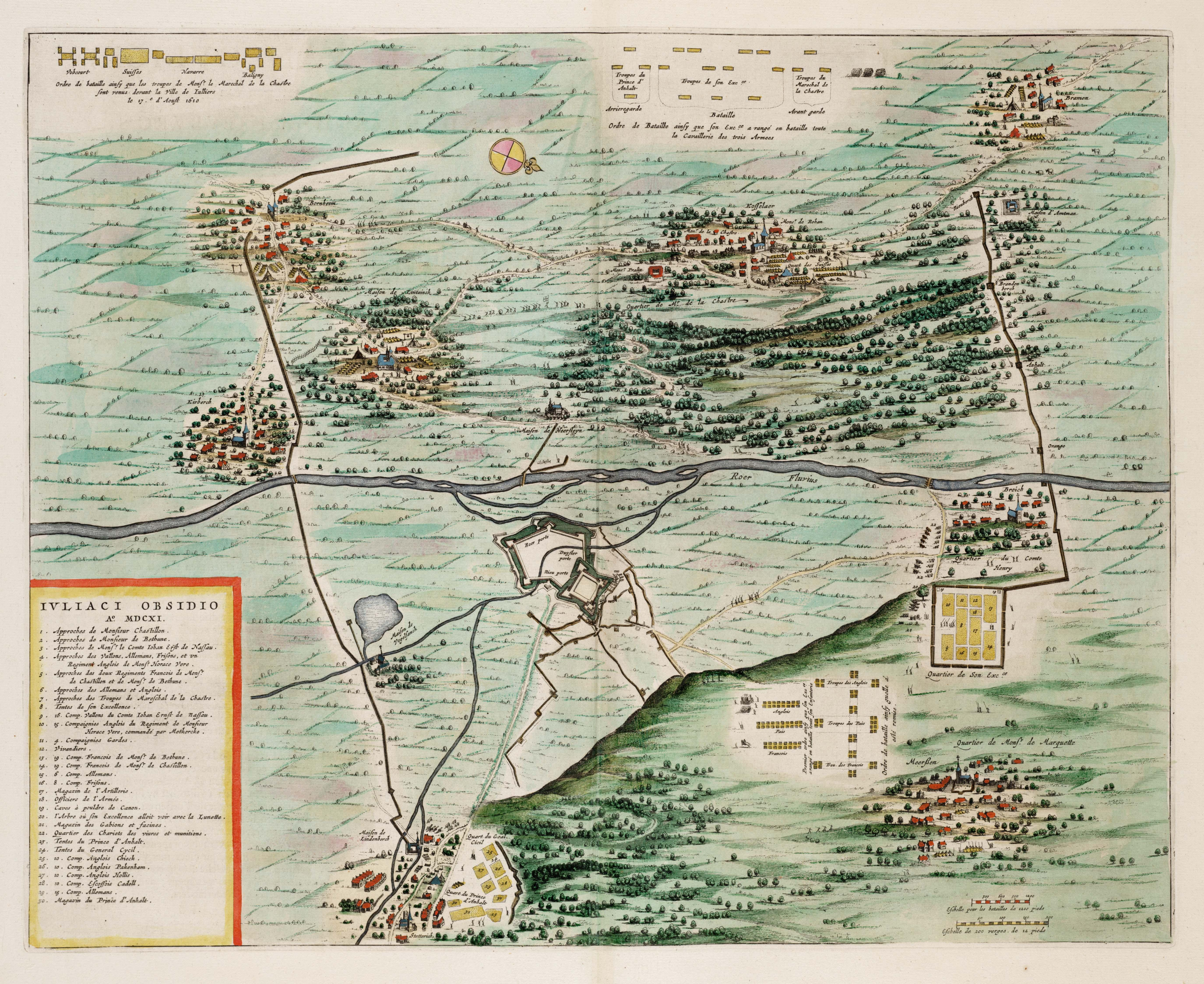
The Siege of Jülich (1610). By Joan Blaeu, 1649. From the Atlas van Loon.

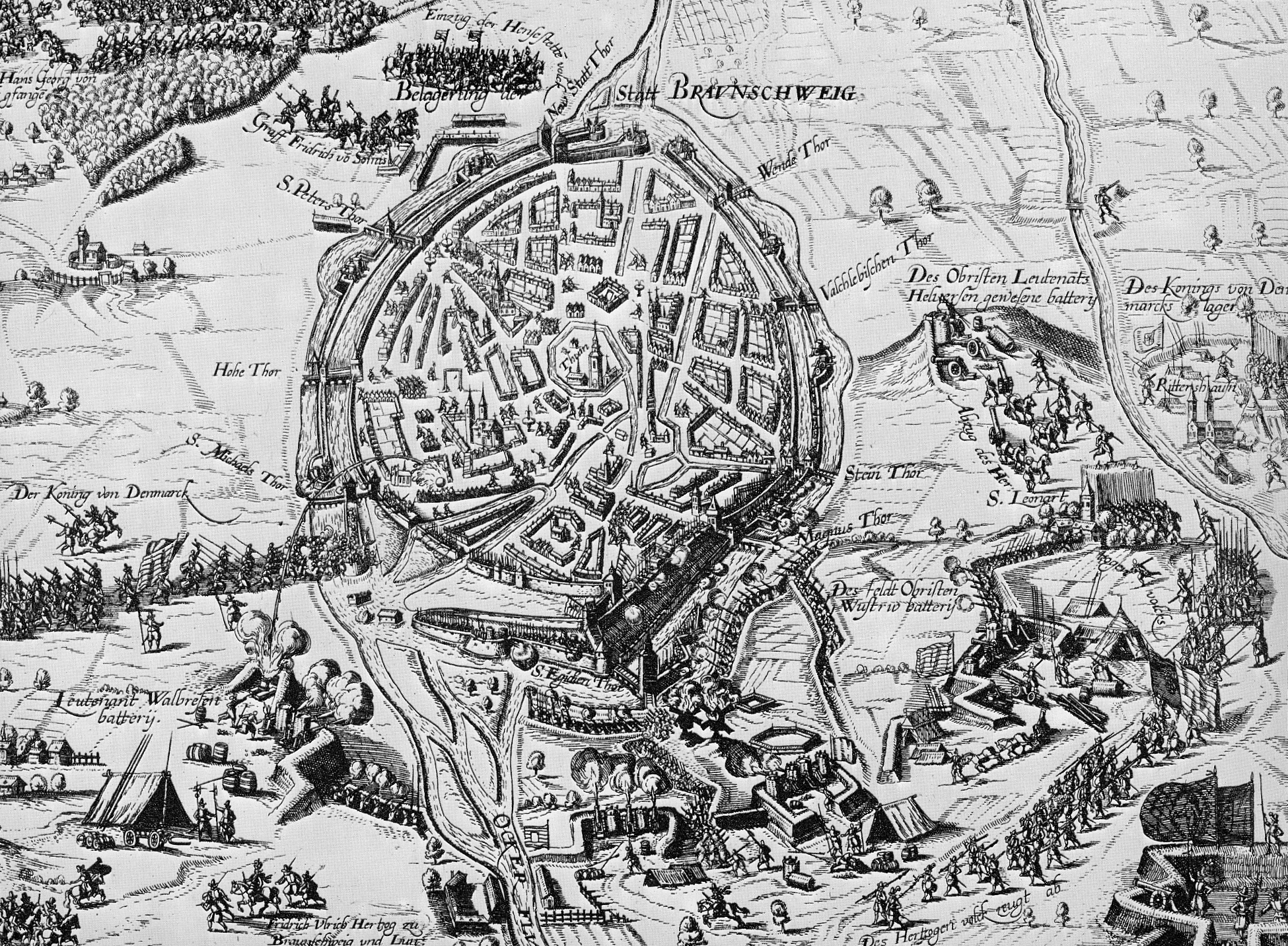
The Siege of Brunswick (1615). Print, 1615.

=== Hereditary Count of Nassau-Siegen ===
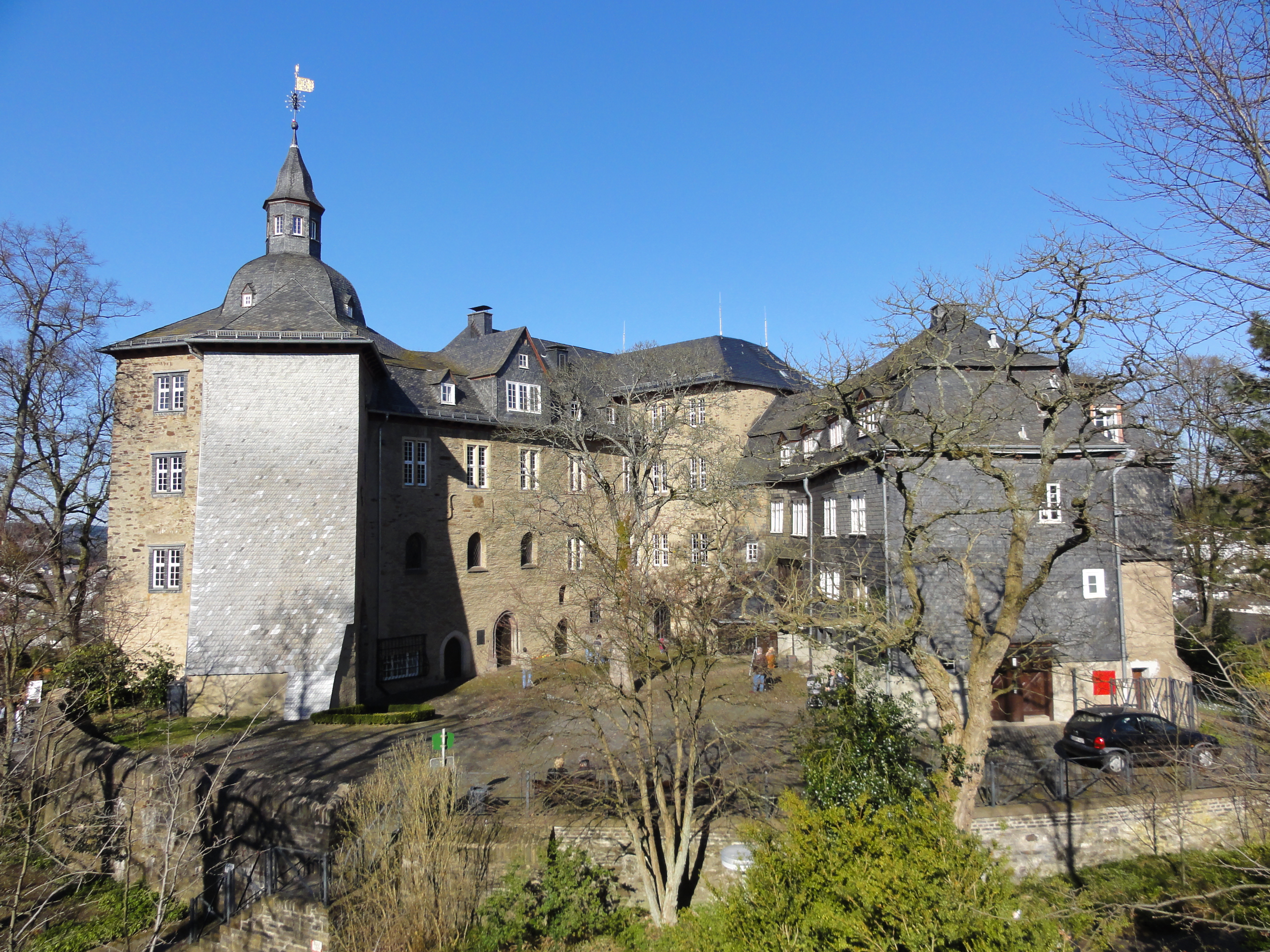
Siegen Castle, 2011.

When his grandfather Count John VI the Elder of Nassau-Siegen died on 8 October 1606, he was succeeded by John Ernest's father together with his brothers William Louis, George, Ernest Casimir and John Louis. On 30 March 1607 these brothers divided their possessions. John the Middle acquired Siegen, Freudenberg, Netphen, Hilchenbach, Ferndorf and the Haingericht. (Note: "The Haingericht was certainly located around the castle of Hainchen, which passed with its dependencies to the House of Nassau in 1313. See Historische Stätten Deutschlands III, 245.") The brothers then also signed a succession treaty. By this agreement the heirs of the brothers were explicitly forbidden to convert to a religion other than the Reformed confession. Since the partition, John the Middle has had his Residenz in Siegen Castle, which he had renovated around that time. Because the county of Nassau-Siegen was such a small country (it had about 9.000 inhabitants and yielded about 13.000 guilders annually) John the Middle decided that the county should not be divided up again. To avoid this, on 8 April 1607 he made a will and testament, which stated that only the eldest son would rule, and the other children should be compensated with money or offices. Thus, John Ernest became the heir apparent of Nassau-Siegen. With his father, his brother John the Younger and his uncle George of Nassau-Beilstein, John Ernest was present at the coronation of Roman King Matthias in Frankfurt in 1612.

=== In the service of the Venetian Republic ===
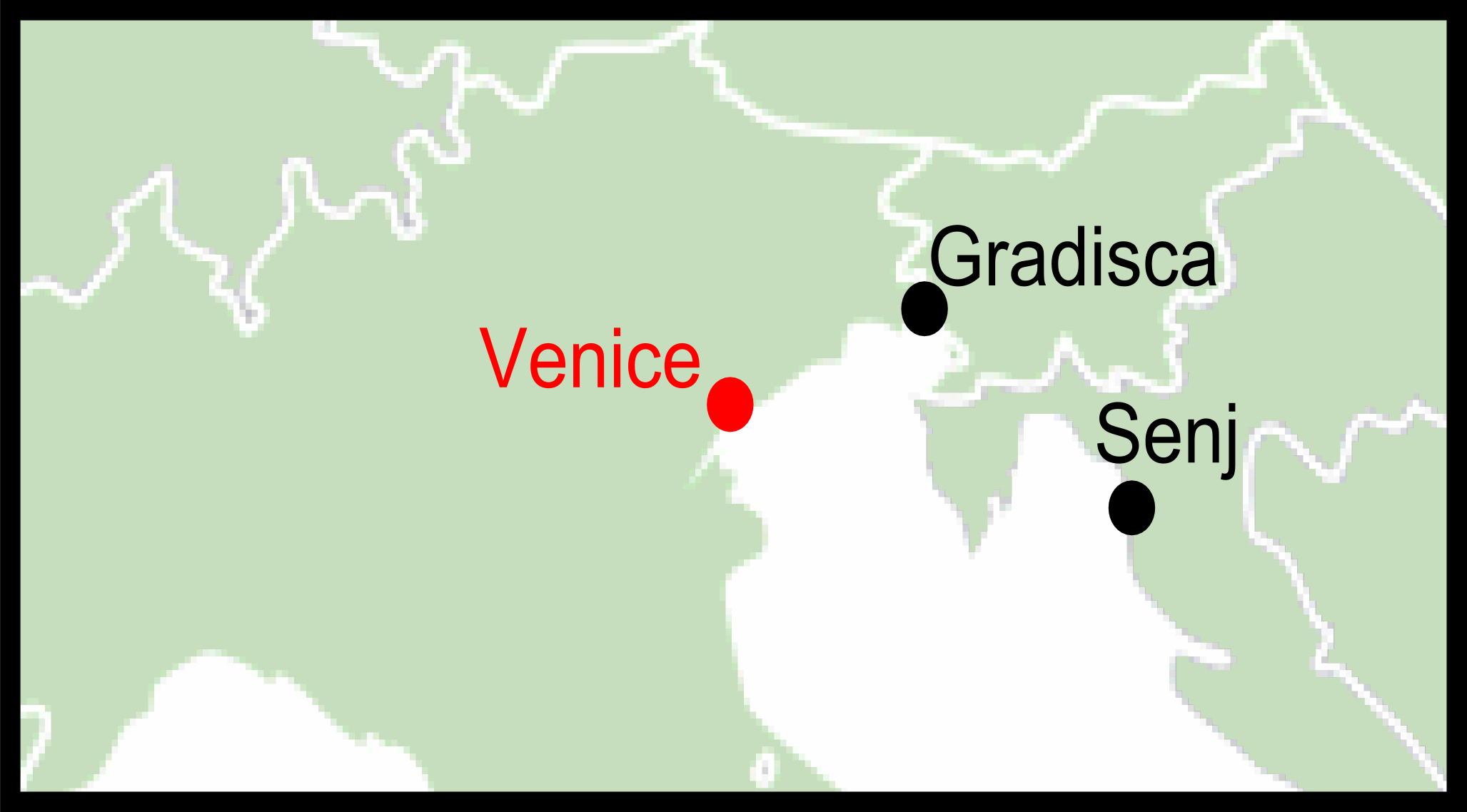
The location of the main cities in the Uskok War.

The signing of the Twelve Years' Truce and the end of the War of the Jülich Succession deprived John Ernest of the opportunity to distinguish himself further. In 1616 the Republic of Venice under Doge Giovanni Bembo requested assistance from the States General of the Netherlands in its struggle with Archduke Ferdinand of Inner Austria over the borders of Istria and Friuli and the protection which Ferdinand granted to the Uskoks, notorious pirates in the Adriatic Sea. After these Uskoks, this war between Venice and Inner Austria was called the Uskok War. The request concerned foot soldiers and cavalry. John Ernest obtained permission from the States General in a resolution of 3 October 1616 to enter the service of the Venetian Republic with a regiment of foot soldiers. The permission concerned a leave of absence from State service for one year to enable him to take command of 3,000 men.

On 2 March 1617, John Ernest, at the head of his soldiers, left the shipstead of Texel and, after a prosperous journey, arrived in Venice on 4 April. (Note: Moquette (1914), p. 34 however, states that John Ernest, and before him some of his officers, went overland to Venice, where they had to wait for the Dutch auxiliary troops.) There John Ernest was received with joy. The Doge of Venice had previously granted him the rank and title of General of the Dutch Armed Forces.

John Ernest arrived with his troops at Gradisca, a small but strong Austrian town in the County of Gorizia, on the River Isonzo, which had been besieged in vain by the Venetians for a long time. Initially, two enemy sconces were conquered by the Dutch, but when John Ernest wanted to take advantage of the terror of the besieged, the commander of the Venetians prevented him from doing so. John Ernest remained with his troops before Gradisca, and no doubt this city would have collapsed if the peace had not been signed shortly before. John Ernest did not live to see the signing of the peace; he died shortly before in Udine of dysentery. The auxiliary army of John Ernest and also the troops of some other Dutch leaders dwindled away in a few years. The leaders were involved in conflicts or died. In the years 1619 and 1620, many of the survivors returned to the homeland.

=== Death, burial and reburial ===
John Ernest died in Udine in the night of 16/17 September 1617^{Jul.}. (Note: "Dek (1962) indicates Udine as the place of death. See the file in the Royal House Archive of the Netherlands (4/135), entitled: «Ableben von Johann Ernst, Erbgraf zu Nassau-Siegen den 17 September stil veteri (1617) in Mitternacht zu Udine». The death announcement contained therein, as well as other announcements found in the State Archives Wiesbaden (170^{III} 1617 Sep. Dez.) or in the State Archives Marburg (File 115, Waldeck 2, Nassau 339), were all sent from Udine by the brother of the deceased on 27-9 (i.e. new style), and indicate that the death, after an illness of three or four weeks, occurred, either «heute diese Nacht umb 12 Uhr», or «le 26, environ à minuit». All this information is consistent, and we can be sure that the count died during the siege of Udine, in the night of 16 to 17-9-1617 old style. See also a document concerning his death, on the occasion of his burial on 19-4-1618 in Siegen (Royal House Archive of the Netherlands 3/1072): «27 Septembris, Anno 1617 ohngefehr umb Mitternacht … zu Udina».") His body was embalmed, and taken in a coach to Venice. From there, his body was taken at the expense of the Venetian Republic to Siegen, where it was interred on 19 April 1618 under the choir of the St. Nicholas Church. There, his father had planned the construction of a dignified burial vault for the dynasty he founded. For this, there are remarkable notes in Latin, partly in elegiac couplets, for a projected memorial and burial place of the sovereign family, from the time around 1620, with the names of all 25 children from his two marriages, also with details of birth, marriage and death of his relatives. Since the project was not carried out, the burials of the members of the sovereign family between 1607 and 1658 took place in the inadequate burial vault under the choir of the mentioned parish church. John Ernest was reburied in the Fürstengruft in Siegen on 29 April 1690.

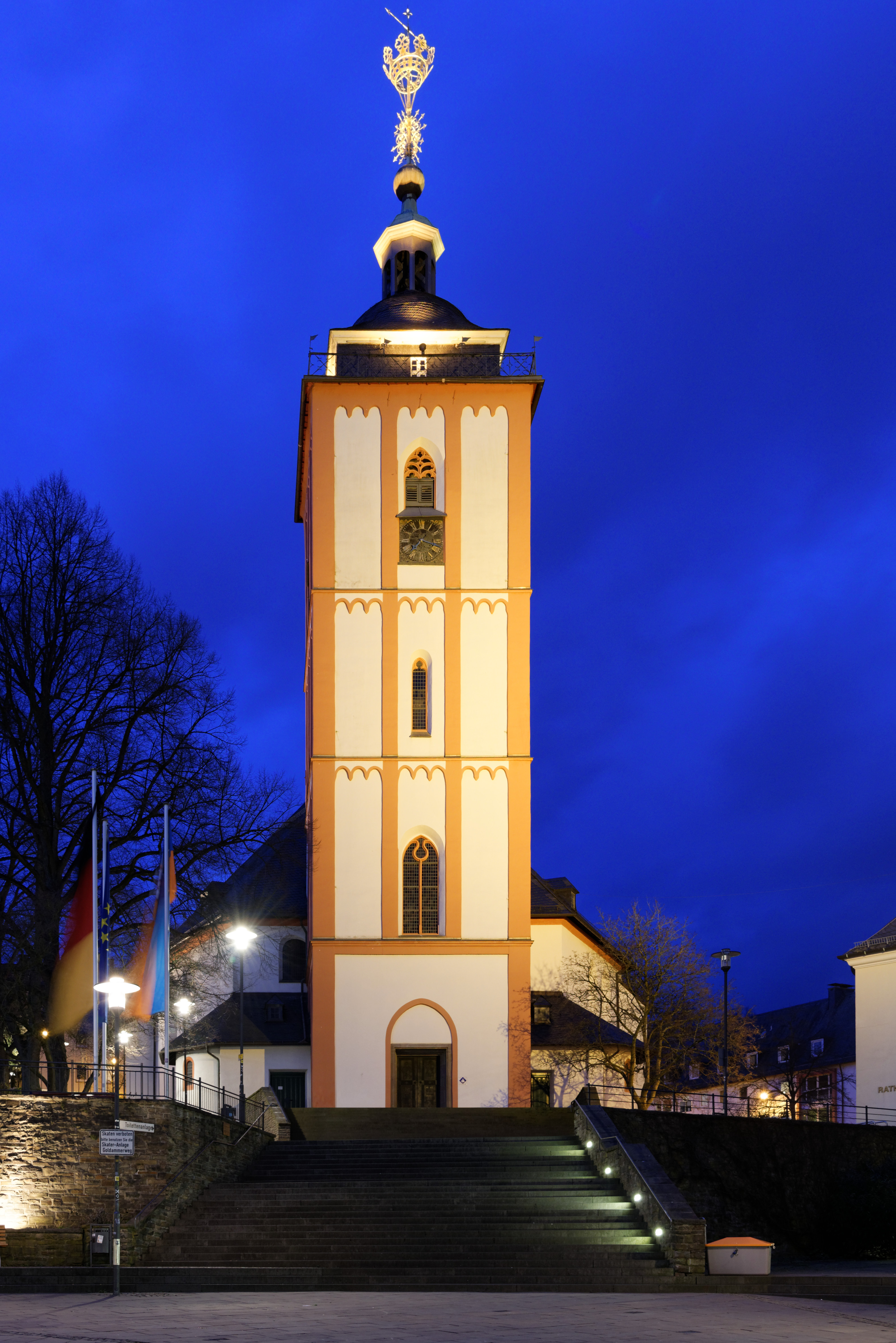
The St. Nicholas Church in Siegen. Photo: Matthias Böhm, 2016.

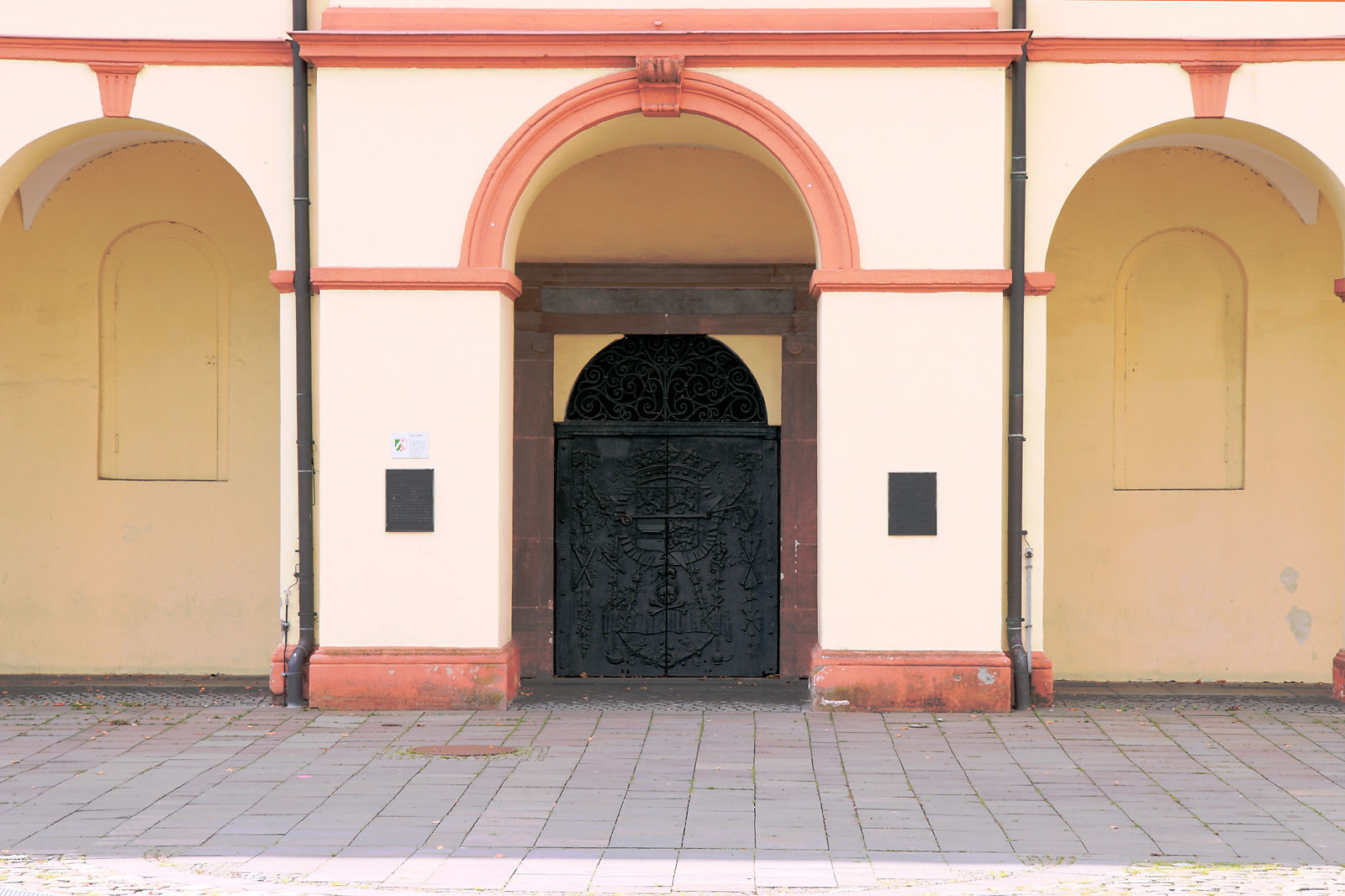
The entrance to the Fürstengruft in Siegen. Photo: Bob Ionescu, 2009.

== Ancestors ==
Ancestors of John Ernest of Nassau-Siegen
Great-great-grandparents	John V of Nassau-Siegen (1455–1516) ⚭ 1482; Elisabeth of Hesse-Marburg (1466–1523)	Bodo III the Blissful of Stolberg-Wernigerode (1467–1538) ⚭ 1500; Anne of Eppstein-Königstein (1481–1538)	John IV of Leuchtenberg (1470–1531) ⚭ 1502; Margaret of Schwarzburg-Blankenburg (1482–1518)	Frederick I the Elder of Brandenburg-Ansbach (1460–1536) ⚭ 1479; Sophia of Poland (1464–1512)	Philip I of Waldeck-Waldeck (1445–1475) ⚭ 1464; Joanne of Nassau-Siegen (1444–1468)	William of Runkel (d. 1489) ⚭ 1454; Irmgard of Rollingen (d. 1514)	Gerlach II of Isenburg-Grenzau (d. 1500) ⚭ 1455; Hildegard of Sierck (d. 1490)	Henry of Hunolstein-Neumagen (d. 1486) ⚭ 1466; Elisabeth de Boulay (d. 1507)
Great-grandparents	William I the Rich of Nassau-Siegen (1487–1559) ⚭ 1531; Juliane of Stolberg-Wernigerode (1506–1580)		George III of Leuchtenberg (1502–1555) ⚭ 1528; Barbara of Brandenburg-Ansbach (1495–1552)		Henry VIII of Waldeck-Wildungen (1465–1513) ⚭ before 1492; Anastasia of Runkel (d. 1502/03)		Salentin VII of Isenburg-Grenzau (before 1470–1534) ⚭ Elisabeth of Hunolstein-Neumagen (c. 1475–1536/38)	
Grandparents	John VI the Elder of Nassau-Siegen (1536–1606) ⚭ 1559; Elisabeth of Leuchtenberg (1537–1579)				Philip IV of Waldeck-Wildungen (1493–1574) ⚭ 1554; Jutta of Isenburg-Grenzau (d. 1564)			
Parents	John VII the Middle of Nassau-Siegen (1561–1623) ⚭ 1581; Magdalene of Waldeck-Wildungen (1558–1599)							

== Sources ==
- Van der Aa, A.J. (1860). "Jan Ernst graaf van Nassau-Siegen". Biographisch Woordenboek der Nederlanden, bevattende levensbeschrijvingen van zoodanige personen, die zich op eenigerlei wijze in ons vaderland hebben vermaard gemaakt (in Dutch). Vol. Negende deel. Haarlem: J.J. van Brederode. pp. 91–92.
- Aßmann, Helmut & Menk, Friedhelm (1996). Auf den Spuren von Nassau und Oranien in Siegen (in German). Siegen: Gesellschaft für Stadtmarketing Siegen e.V.
- Blok, P.J. (1911). "Johan Ernst I". In Molhuysen, P.C. & Blok, P.J. (eds.). Nieuw Nederlandsch Biografisch Woordenboek (in Dutch). Vol. Eerste deel. Leiden: A.W. Sijthoff. p. 1222.
- Dek, A.W.E. (1962). Graf Johann der Mittlere von Nassau-Siegen und seine 25 Kinder (in German). Rijswijk: Krips Repro.
- Dek, A.W.E. (1968). "De afstammelingen van Juliana van Stolberg tot aan het jaar van de Vrede van Münster". Spiegel der Historie. Maandblad voor de geschiedenis der Nederlanden (in Dutch). 1968 (7/8): 228–303.
- Dek, A.W.E. (1970). Genealogie van het Vorstenhuis Nassau (in Dutch). Zaltbommel: Europese Bibliotheek.
- Huberty, Michel; Giraud, Alain & Magdelaine, F. & B. (1981). l'Allemagne Dynastique (in French). Vol. Tome III: Brunswick-Nassau-Schwarzbourg. Le Perreux: Alain Giraud. ISBN 2-901138-03-9.
- Kossmann, F.K.H. (1932). De spelen van Gijsbrecht van Hogendorp (in Dutch). 's‑Gravenhage: Martinus Nijhoff.
- Lück, Alfred (1981) [1967]. Siegerland und Nederland (in German) (2nd ed.). Siegen: Siegerländer Heimatverein e.V.
- Menk, Friedhelm (1971). Quellen zur Geschichte des Siegerlandes im niederländischen königlichen Hausarchiv (in German). Siegen: Stadt Siegen & Forschungsstelle Siegerland.
- Menk, Friedhelm (2004). "Die Fürstengruft zu Siegen und die darin von 1669 bis 1781 erfolgten Beisetzungen". In Burwitz, Ludwig; Menk, Friedhelm; Opfermann, Ulrich Friedrich; Pfau, Dieter & Plaum, Bernd D. (eds.). Siegener Beiträge. Jahrbuch für regionale Geschichte (in German). Vol. 9. Siegen: Geschichtswerkstatt Siegen – Arbeitskreis für Regionalgeschichte e.V. pp. 183–202. ISSN 1431-6684.
- Moquette, H.C.H. (1914). "Rotterdammers in dienst van Venetië". Rotterdamsch Jaarboekje (PDF) (in Dutch). pp. 33–44.
- Poelhekke, J.J. (1978). Frederik Hendrik, Prins van Oranje. Een biografisch drieluik (PDF) (in Dutch). Zutphen: De Walburg Pers. ISBN 90-6011-443-4.
- Textor von Haiger, Johann (1617). Nassauische Chronik. In welcher des vralt, hochlöblich, vnd weitberühmten Stamms vom Hause Naßaw, Printzen vnd Graven Genealogi oder Stammbaum: deren geburt, leben, heurath, kinder, zu Friden- vnd Kriegszeiten verzichtete sachen und thaten, absterben, und sonst denckwürdige Geschichten. Sampt einer kurtzen general Nassoviae und special Beschreibung der Graf- und Herschaften Naßaw-Catzenelnbogen, etc (in German). Herborn: Christoph Raab.
- Vorsterman van Oyen, A.A. (1882). Het vorstenhuis Oranje-Nassau. Van de vroegste tijden tot heden (in Dutch). Leiden & Utrecht: A.W. Sijthoff & J.L. Beijers.
