= Henry VIII of Waldeck =

Count of Waldeck-Wildungen

Henry VIII, Count of Waldeck
- Born: 1465
- Died: 1513 (aged 47–48)
- Buried: Marienthal monastery in Netze (today part of Waldeck)
- Noble family: House of Waldeck
- Spouse: Anastasia of Runkel
- Father: Philip I, Count of Waldeck
- Mother: Joanne of Nassau-Siegen

Henry VIII (1465–1513) was a count of Waldeck and the founder of the older line of Waldeck-Wildungen. He was also temporarily governor of the County of Vianden, a possession of the House of Nassau.

== Life ==
He was the son of Philip I of Waldeck and his wife Joanne of Nassau-Siegen, a daughter of John IV of Nassau-Siegen. After the early death of his parents, his uncle Philip II acted as his guardian.

In 1486, Henry VIII came of age. He and his former guardian Philip II decided to divide the family possessions. They would continue to share the City of Waldeck and Waldeck Castle. Henry VIII received the southern part, known as Waldeck-Wildungen and Philip II received the northern part, Waldeck-Eisenberg. In 1487, they jointly founded a Franciscan monastery at Korbach.

In 1492, Henry married Anastasia, the heiress of William of Runkel (d. 1489). Via this marriage, the County of Wied and part of Isenburg came into his possession. He began calling himself Count of Waldeck and Lord of Isenburg. After his wife died in 1503, he sold the possessions to Count John III of Wied, a cousin of his wife. He had two sons with Anastasia, Philip IV and William.

In 1493, Count Engelbert II of Nassau-Dillenburg, an uncle from his mother's side, appointed him as governor of the County of Vianden, an area that is now part of Luxembourg.

When Otto IV died in 1495, the Waldeck-Landau line died out and its land reverted to Waldeck. Henry VIII and Philip II disputed the Waldeck-Landau inheritance from 1496. Despite the Eternal Landfrieden, which Emperor Maximilian I had declared in 1495, this dispute was initially fought at gunpoint. It was not until 1498 that the two counts agreed to stop fighting and present their case to the newly created Reichskammergericht. In 1507, they settled out of court. The towns of Korbach, Niederwildungen, Sachsenhausen, Sachsenberg and Freienhagen remained shared property, as did the castle, city and districts of Waldeck and Rhoden and the Lordship of Itter. Henry received the city, castle and district of Altwildungen. In all, Henry owned about a third of the family possessions.

in 1504, Henry VIII and Philip II with their armies joined Landgrave William II of Hesse in a campaign to implement the imperial ban against the Electorate of the Palatinate. In 1505, they were present at the Diet of Cologne, as part of the Landgrave's entourage. In 1509 some noblemen attacked Henry and his asked the Landgrave in vain for support. In 1512, the Counts of Waldeck joined a newly founded association of counts.

Henry died in 1513 and was buried in the Marienthal monastery in Netze (today part of Waldeck).

Henry VIII of Waldeck House of Waldeck Born: 1465 Died: 1513
Preceded by Philip I	Count of Waldeck-Waldeck; 1475-1513	Succeeded by Philip IV
Preceded by Otto IV	Count of Waldeck-Landau; 1495-1513	Succeeded by Philip IV
