= Joanne of Nassau-Siegen =

German countess (1444–1468)

- Countess of Waldeck
- Coat of arms
- Full name: Joanne Countess of Nassau-Siegen
- Native name: Johanna Gräfin von Nassau-Siegen
- Born: Johanna Gräfin zu Nassau, Vianden und Diez, Frau zu Breda; 1444
- Died: May 1468 (aged 23–24)
- Noble family: House of Nassau-Siegen
- Spouse: Philip I of Waldeck
- Issue Detail: Henry VIII
- Father: John IV of Nassau-Siegen
- Mother: Mary of Looz-Heinsberg

Countess Joanne of Nassau-Siegen (Note: In many sources she is called Joanne of Nassau-Dillenburg. The County of Nassau-Siegen is erroneously called Nassau-Dillenburg in many sources. The county was not named after the small, unimportant city of Dillenburg, which did not even have a church until 1491, but after the, for that time, large city of Siegen, the economic centre of the county and the counts' main residence. See Lück (1981), passim. It is also evident from the numbering of the reigning counts with the given name John. One John without regal number who ruled the County of Nassau-Dillenburg in the period 1303–1328, and eight counts by the name of John who ruled the County of Nassau-Siegen in the period 1362–1638.) (1444 – May 1468), German: Joanne Gräfin von Nassau-Siegen, official titles: Gräfin zu Nassau, Vianden und Diez, Frau zu Breda, was a countess from the House of Nassau-Siegen, a cadet branch of the Ottonian Line of the House of Nassau, and through marriage Countess of Waldeck.

== Biography ==
Joanne was born in 1444 as the second daughter of Count John IV of Nassau-Siegen and his wife Lady Mary of Looz-Heinsberg. (Note: Joanne is not mentioned by Vorsterman van Oyen, A.A. (1882). Het vorstenhuis Oranje-Nassau. Van de vroegste tijden tot heden (in Dutch). Leiden & Utrecht: A.W. Sijthoff & J.L. Beijers. and Textor von Haiger, Johann (1617). Nassauische Chronik. In welcher des vralt, hochlöblich, vnd weitberühmten Stamms vom Hause Naßaw, Printzen vnd Graven Genealogi oder Stammbaum: deren geburt, leben, heurath, kinder, zu Friden- vnd Kriegszeiten verzichtete sachen und thaten, absterben, und sonst denckwürdige Geschichten. Sampt einer kurtzen general Nassoviae und special Beschreibung der Graf- und Herschaften Naßaw-Catzenelnbogen, etc (in German). Herborn: Christoph Raab.)

Joanne married on 14 October 1464 to Count Philip I of Waldeck (1445 – 1475), the eldest son of Count Wolrad I of Waldeck and Countess Barbara of Wertheim. The parents on both sides are said to have designated their children for each other as early as 1452.

Joanne died already in May 1468.

== Issue ==
From the marriage of Joanne and Philip only one son was born:

1. Count Henry VIII (1465 – 1513), succeeded his father or grandfather in 1475 and divided the County of Waldeck with his uncle Philip II in 1507 and founded the older line of Waldeck-Eisenberg. He married in 1492 to Anastasia, daughter of William of Runkel and Isenburg. She died in 1502.

== Ancestors ==
Ancestors of Joanne of Nassau-Siegen
Great-great-grandparents	Otto II of Nassau-Siegen (c. 1305–1350/51) ⚭ 1331; Adelaide of Vianden (d. 1376)	Adolf II of the Mark (d. 1347) ⚭ 1332; Margaret of Cleves (d. after 1348)	John II of Polanen (d. 1378) ⚭ 1348; Oda of Horne (d. before 1353)	John II of Salm (d. after 1400) ⚭ after 1355; Philippa of Valkenburg (?–?)	John I of Heinsberg (d. 1334) ⚭ c. 1324; Catherine of Voorne (d. 1366)	William I of Jülich (d. 1362) ⚭ 1324; Joanna of Hainaut (1311/13–1374)	Bernhard of Solms (d. 1347/49) ⚭ ? (?–?)	Philip VI of Falkenstein (d. 1372/73) ⚭ before 1363; Agnes of Falkenstein (d. 1380)
Great-grandparents	John I of Nassau-Siegen (c. 1339–1416) ⚭ 1357; Margaret of the Mark (d. 1409)		John III of Polanen (d. 1394) ⚭ 1390; Odilia of Salm (d. 1428)		Godfrey II of Heinsberg (d. 1395) ⚭ 1357; Philippa of Jülich (d. 1390)		Otto I of Solms (d. 1410) ⚭ Agnes of Falkenstein (c. 1358–1409)	
Grandparents	Engelbert I of Nassau-Siegen (c. 1370–1442) ⚭ 1403; Joanne of Polanen (1392–1445)				John II of Looz-Heinsberg (d. 1438) ⚭ 1423; Anne of Solms (d. 1433)			
Parents	John IV of Nassau-Siegen (1410–1475) ⚭ 1440; Mary of Looz-Heinsberg (1424–1502)							

== Literature ==
- Varnhagen, Johann Adolf Theodor Ludwig (1853). Grundlage der Waldeckischen Landes- und Regentengeschichte (in German). Vol. Zweiter Band. Arolsen: Verlag der Speyer'schen Buchhandlung.

== Sources ==
- Dek, A.W.E. (1970). Genealogie van het Vorstenhuis Nassau (in Dutch). Zaltbommel: Europese Bibliotheek.
- Hoffmeister, Jacob Christoph Carl (1883). Historisch-genealogisches Handbuch über alle Grafen und Fürsten von Waldeck und Pyrmont seit 1228 (in German). Cassel: Verlag Gustav Klaunig.
- Huberty, Michel; Giraud, Alain & Magdelaine, F. & B. (1981). l'Allemagne Dynastique (in French). Vol. Tome III: Brunswick-Nassau-Schwarzbourg. Le Perreux: Alain Giraud. ISBN 2-901138-03-9.
- Lück, Alfred (1981) [1967]. Siegerland und Nederland (in German) (2nd ed.). Siegen: Siegerländer Heimatverein e.V.
- Schutte, O. (1979). "Genealogische gegevens". In Tamse, C.A. (ed.). Nassau en Oranje in de Nederlandse geschiedenis (in Dutch). Alphen aan den Rijn: A.W. Sijthoff. pp. 40–44. ISBN 90-218-2447-7.
