= Philip I of Waldeck =

Count of Waldeck-Waldeck

Philip I, Count of Waldeck
- Born: 1445
- Died: 1475 (aged 29–30)
- Noble family: House of Waldeck
- Spouse: Joanne of Nassau-Siegen
- Father: Wolrad I, Count of Waldeck
- Mother: Barbara of Wertheim

Philip I, Count of Waldeck (1445–1475) was briefly Count of Waldeck-Waldeck in Germany in 1475.

He was the son of Count Wolrad I and his wife Barbara of Wertheim. He inherited the County of Waldeck when his father died in 1475, and died himself later that year. Nothing remarkable happened during his brief reign.

In 1464, he married Joanne, the daughter of Count John IV of Nassau-Siegen. They had one son: Henry VIII.
