= Manuel, Hereditary Prince of Portugal =

Portuguese prince

Manuel
- Prince of Portugal (disputed)
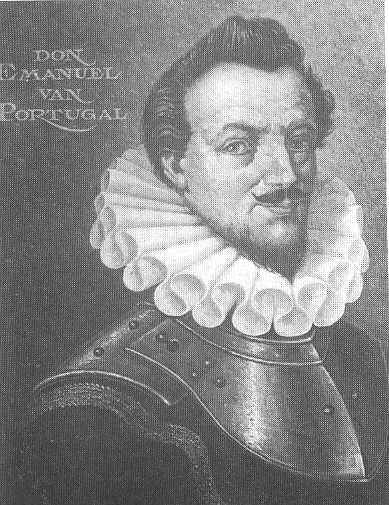
- Born: 1568; Tangiers, Kingdom of Portugal
- Died: 22 June 1638; Brussels
- Spouse: Countess Emilia of Nassau; Luísa Osório
- Issue: Maria Belgica; Manuel António; Emilia Louise; Christopher William Louis; Anna Louise; Juliana Catherine; Mauritia Eleonora; Sabina Delphica
- House: House of Aviz
- Father: António, Prior of Crato
- Mother: Ana Barbosa

Manuel of Portugal (c. 1568–22 June 1638) was the illegitimate son of António, Prior of Crato, pretender to the Portuguese throne during the 1580 Portuguese succession crisis. He secretly married in 1597 Countess Emilia of Nassau, daughter of William the Silent and Anna of Saxony.

== Early life ==
Manuel was born in Tangier to Portuguese pretender António, Prior of Crato and one Anna Barbosa. Due to his religious office, António of Crato was not allowed to marry. After a failed attempt to gain the throne in 1580, António used to live in France and England. His son Manuel of Portugal is also known as Emanuel I, in his Dutch context.

== Acclamation as prince ==
After the death of King Henry, his family's return to Portugal and his father's acclamation as king on 24 July 1580, Manuel chose to go by the title of prince of Portugal. However, his father's reign was short and troubled. He lost his title to King Philip II of Spain at the Battle of Alcântra. After hearing about this defeat, Manuel and his father fled to Coimbra to avoid imprisonment, and gathered six thousand men to face the Spanish troops once again. They were once more defeated. With no options left, Manuel and his father were forced to hide in monasteries and friends' houses until they fled to France with the rest of the family. Before, António went to England, asking for Queen Elizabeth I's support, which was granted, but the English troops never arrived to Portugal due to a bout of plague that killed most of the soldiers. Despite everything, António was still acclaimed as king in Azores until the Spanish troops arrived in 1583.

== Family ==
=== First marriage ===
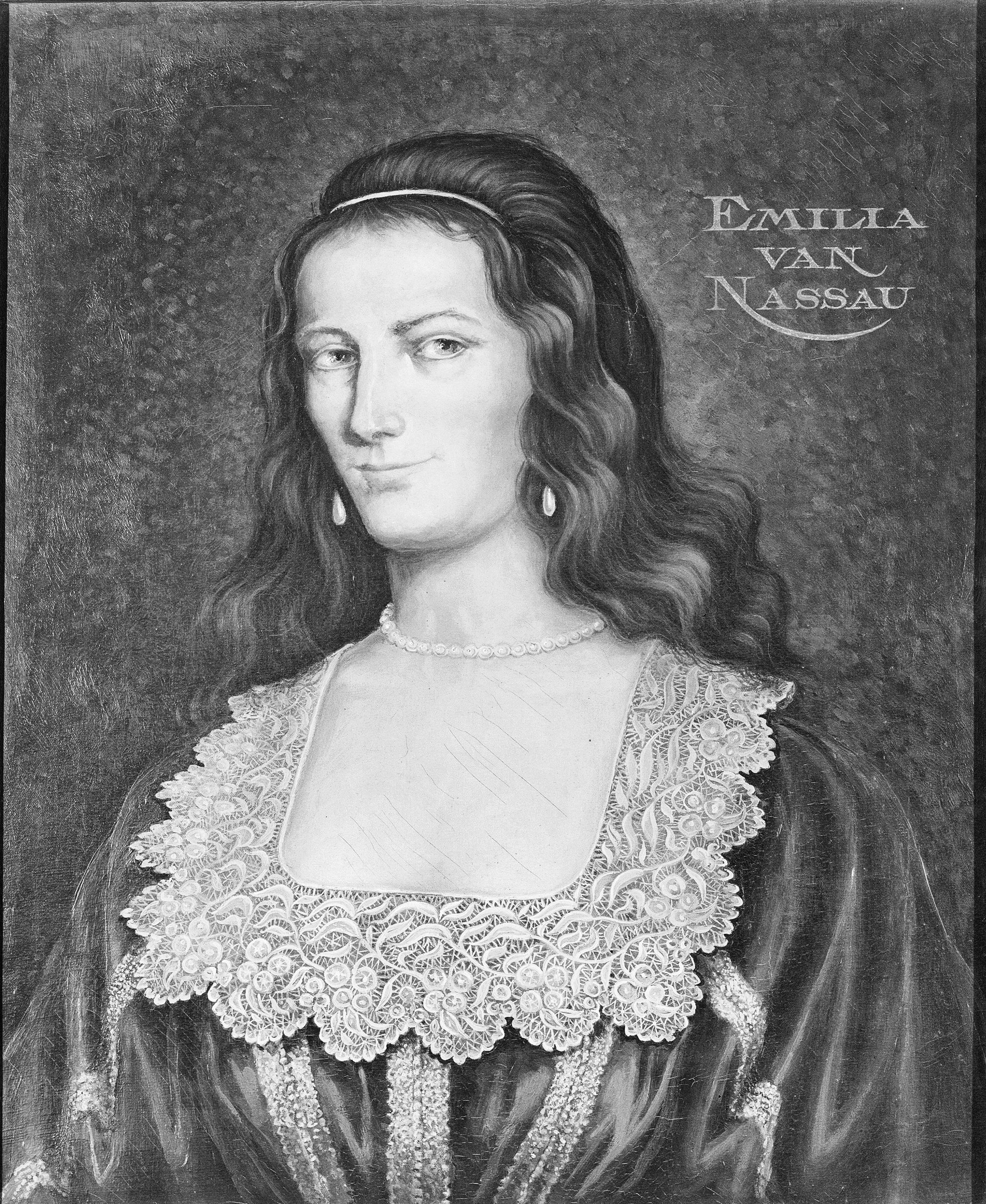
Countess Emilia of Nassau

On 7 November 1597, Manuel wed Countess Emilia of Nassau (1569–1629), a daughter of William I, Prince of Orange and Princess Anna of Saxony. The bride's family were prominent representatives of Calvinism in Europe while the groom was Roman Catholic. Their families opposed the marriage but this did not prevent the couple from being secretly married by a Roman Catholic priest. Consequently, Manuel was forced to flee to Wesel, Germany. Emilia – initially under house detention – was able to follow him in December 1597. The following children were issued from this marriage:

- Maria Belgica (born before 12 October 1598; died 28 July 1647), married in June 1629 to Colonel Theodor Croll (died 1640 in Venice [murdered]), Quartermaster general of Duke Odoardo Farnese, Duke of Parma,
- Manuel António (born 24 February 1600 in Delft; died 27 October 1666 in Schagen), married Johanna of Hanau-Münzenberg; two daughters,
- Emilia Louise (born June 1603 in Delft; died 29 October 1670), unmarried,
- Christopher William Louis (1604–7 July 1660); a military person, commander of the guards of Maurice of Nassau in 1624, Knight of Malta, married to Donna Anna Maria di Capece-Galeoti de Monteleone.
- Anna Louise (born before 3 May 1605; died 5 April 1669), unmarried,
- Juliana Catherine (c. 1607–22 June 1680), unmarried,
- Mauritia Eleonora (born before 10 May 1609; died 25 June 1674), married Count George Frederick of Nassau-Siegen on 4 June 1647 in The Hague; no children.
- Sabina Delphica (1612–20 July 1670), unmarried.

Because of the circumstances of the wedding, Manuel and Emilia used to live in a permanent shortage of money during the first years of their marriage. Only in 1608, Philip William, Prince of Orange was able to arrange the reconciliation of Manuel and Emilia on the one hand and Maurice of Nassau, stadtholder of the United Provinces of the Netherlands, on the other hand. The couple was granted a pension and residences. Life at the stadtholder's court was not easy for them since the Catholic Manuel was shunned by the local society. Therefore, he started secret negotiations with the stewards of the Catholic Spanish Netherlands, the infanta Isabella Clara Eugenia and her husband Albert VII, Archduke of Austria, who promised them a higher apanage than House Orange was paying. After the death of Maurice, when the tensions between his successor Frederick Henry and Manuel were increasing, the latter went to Brussels. His wife who saw Isabella's father king Philip II of Spain as the driving force behind the assassination of her own father decided not to follow Manuel and moved to Geneva together with her daughters where she died in 1629.

The fate of this family was moreover overshadowed by a scandal. The first daughter Maria Belgica was originally meant to marry a Margrave of Baden but rather she escaped with the margrave's Colonel Theodor Croll – a fact that reduced the chances to marriage of her sisters to a minimum at the times. Eleonora Mauritia became the only exception.

=== Second marriage ===
After the death of his first wife, Manuel married for a second time, on 3 April 1630 in Brussels. His bride Luísa Osório was a lady-in-waiting of Isabella. The two of them held prominent positions at Isabella's court.

== Death ==
Manuel died on 22 June 1638 in Brussels and was buried there. He was survived by his second wife.
