= George Frederick of Nassau-Siegen =

German prince and officer in the Dutch Army (1606–1674)

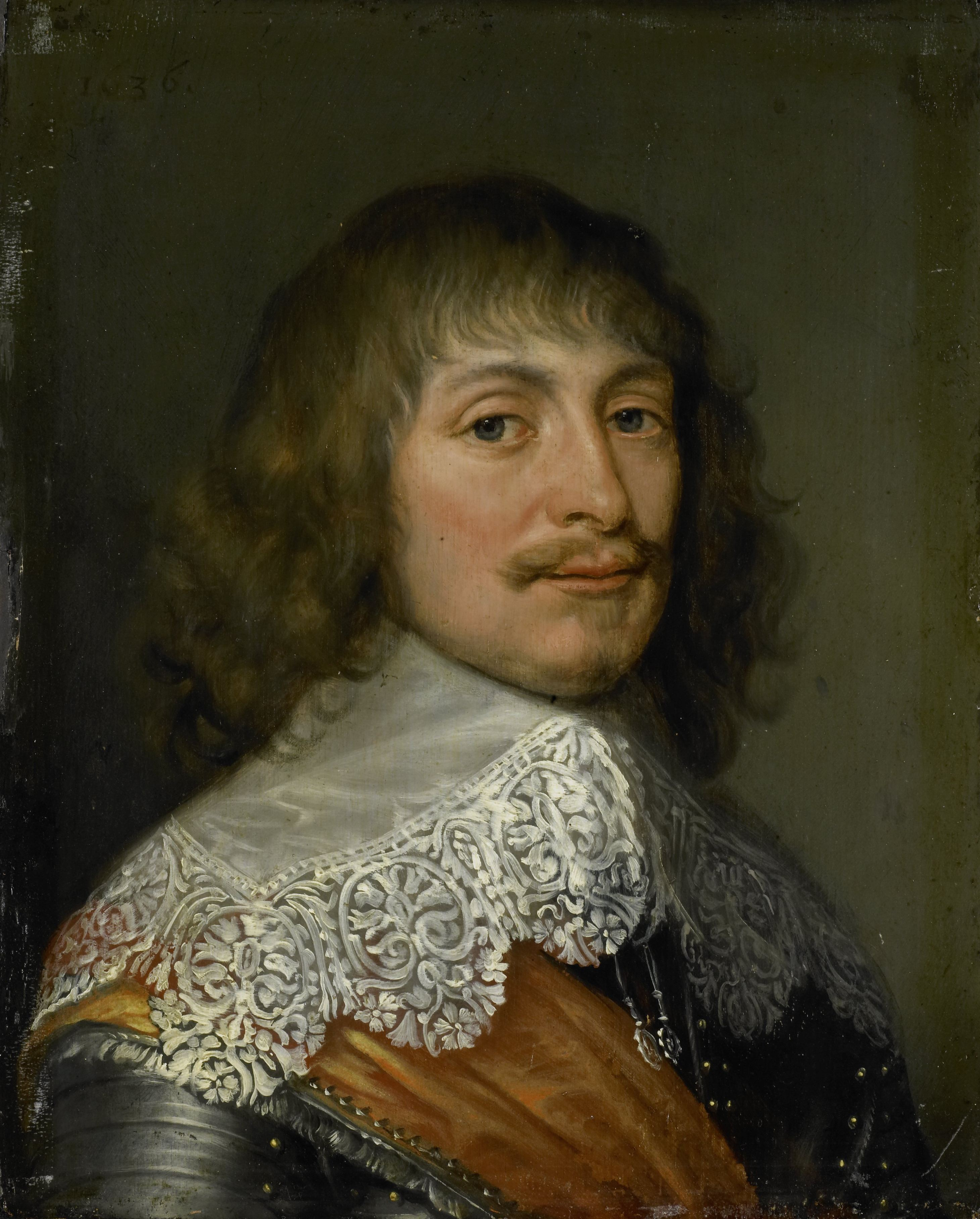
- Prince George Frederick of Nassau-Siegen. Anonymous portrait, 1636. Rijksmuseum Amsterdam.

- Coat of arms
- Full name: George Frederick Louis Prince of Nassau-Siegen
- Native name: Georg Friedrich Ludwig Prinz von Nassau-Siegen
- Born: Georg Friedrich Ludwig Graf zu Nassau, Katzenelnbogen, Vianden und Diez, Herr zu Beilstein; 23 February 1606; Dillenburg Castle
- Died: 2 October 1674 (aged 68); Bergen op Zoom
- Buried: Terborg, later reburied in the Fürstengruft, Siegen
- Noble family: House of Nassau-Siegen
- Spouse: Mauritia Eleonora of Portugal
- Father: John VII 'the Middle' of Nassau-Siegen
- Mother: Margaret of Schleswig-Holstein-Sonderburg
- Occupation: Captain of the infantry in the Dutch States Army 1627, ritmeester of the cavalry 1633, major 1637, colonel 1642, commander of Rheinberg 1648–1658, governor of Bergen op Zoom 1658–1674.

Prince George Frederick of Nassau-Siegen (23 February 1606 – 2 October 1674), German: Georg Friedrich Prinz von Nassau-Siegen, official titles: Prinz von Nassau, Graf zu Katzenelnbogen, Vianden und Diez, Herr zu Beilstein, was a count from the House of Nassau-Siegen, a cadet branch of the Ottonian Line of the House of Nassau. In 1664 he was elevated to the rank and title of prince. He served as an officer in the Dutch States Army, and was successively commander of Rheinberg and governor of Bergen op Zoom.

== Biography ==
George Frederick was born at Dillenburg Castle on 23 February 1606 as the second son of Count John VII 'the Middle' of Nassau-Siegen and his second wife, Duchess Margaret of Schleswig-Holstein-Sonderburg. His full given names were George Frederick Louis, his family called him Fritz. He studied in Kassel in 1622 together with his younger brother William Otto.

=== In the Dutch States Army ===
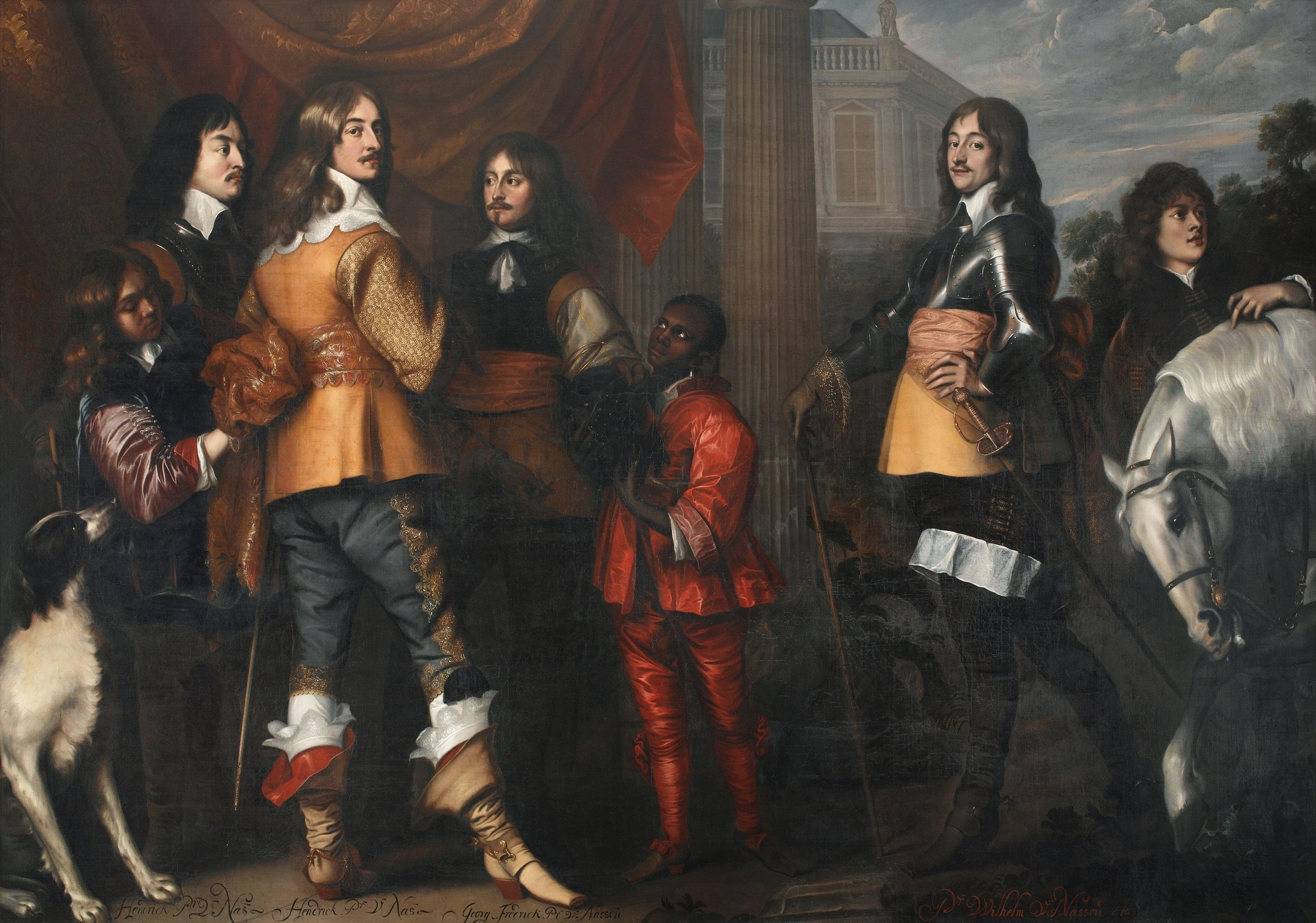
Group portrait of four counts of Nassau by Adriaen Hanneman, 1660–1669. Stadhouderlijk Hof, Leeuwarden. From left: Henry of Nassau-Siegen, Henry Casimir I of Nassau-Diez, George Frederik of Nassau-Siegen, William Frederick of Nassau-Diez.

George Frederick entered the service of the Republic of the United Netherlands and became captain of the infantry in 1627, and in 1633 also ritmeester of the cavalry. In 1637 he was promoted to major and in 1642 to colonel.

In 1638 George Frederick and his second cousin Prince Manuel Antony of Portugal (Note: Prince Manuel Antony of Portugal was the eldest son of Prince Manuel of Portugal and Countess Emilia of Nassau, the youngest daughter of Prince William of Orange and Duchess Anna of Saxony. He later became the brother-in-law of George Frederick when the latter married Manuel Antony's younger sister Mauritia Eleonora.) were captured by the Spanish near Geldern, in 1639 the States-General paid a ransom of £ 1,000 for him.

In 1648 George Frederick became commander of Rheinberg, and in 1658 he became governor of Bergen op Zoom.

On behalf of the House of Nassau, George Frederick and his brothers John Maurice and Henry were witnesses at the marriage of Count William Frederick of Nassau-Diez, the stadtholder of Friesland, and Countess Albertine Agnes of Nassau in Kleve on 2 May 1652.

In 1651 George Frederik became a Knight of the Order of the Elephant, and in 1671 also a Knight of the Order of the Dannebrog. On 6 May 1664 he was elevated into the Reichsfürstenstand.

=== Succession dispute for the County of Nassau-Siegen ===
The third will and testament of Count John VII 'the Middle' of 1621 bequeathed John Maurice and his younger brothers from their father's second marriage the district of Freudenberg, some villages in the Haingericht (Note: "The Haingericht was certainly located around the castle of Hainchen, which passed with its dependencies to the House of Nassau in 1313. See Historische Stätten Deutschlands III, 245.") and a third part of the administration of the city of Siegen. For the eldest son from the first marriage, John 'the Younger', only one third of the county was provided for in this will. On 6 August 1621, he was informed of this, with a precise statement of the reasons that had led his father to take this step. On 9 May 1623, i.e. not until two years later, John 'the Younger' protested against this with a letter from Frankfurt to the councillors of Siegen. In the meantime he had not been idle and had not hesitated to denounce his father to the Emperor. At the time of his letter of protest he was certainly already aware of the Poenale mandatum cassatorium, which Emperor Ferdinand II officially issued some time later, on 27 June 1623, informing John 'the Middle' that at the time of making his third will as a fellow combatant of the outlawed 'Winter King' he was not entitled to make a will. He had to revoke it and answer to an imperial court within two months. It seems that John 'the Younger' then shrank from having the imperial decree delivered to his seriously ill father.

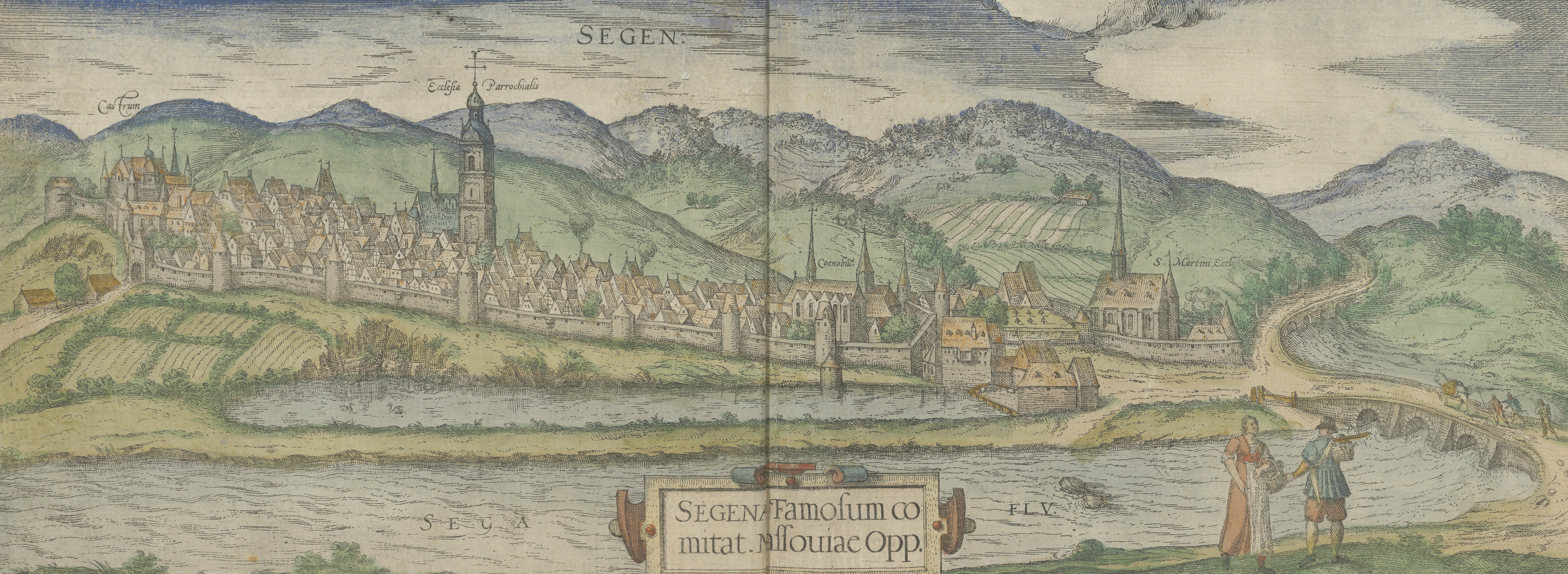
Siegen in 1617. From Braun & Hogenberg, Civitates orbis terrarum Band 6, Cologne, 1617. On the left Siegen Castle.

John 'the Middle' died at Siegen Castle on 27 September 1623. None of the three sons mentioned in the will were present at the death of their father. On 13 October William and John Maurice arrived in Siegen, and on 26 October John 'the Younger'. Everyone knew that there would be a dispute at the reading of the will on 11 December 1623. John 'the Younger' had the imperial decree read out, and when his brothers demurred, he said as he stood up: "Der Kaiser wird uns scheiden!" ("The Emperor will part us!"). He had taken the precaution of obtaining a further imperial decree on 20 November 1623 against Countess Dowager Margaret and her sons, in which the Emperor strictly forbade impeding John's assumption of government, his taking possession of the land and his inauguration. On 12 January 1624, John 'the Younger' was able to accept the homage from the town of Siegen but only because he beforehand had secretly let a squadron of selected horsemen into the town through the castle gate (that is, not through a city gate) in a heavy snowstorm, so that they could not be seen or heard by the town guards.

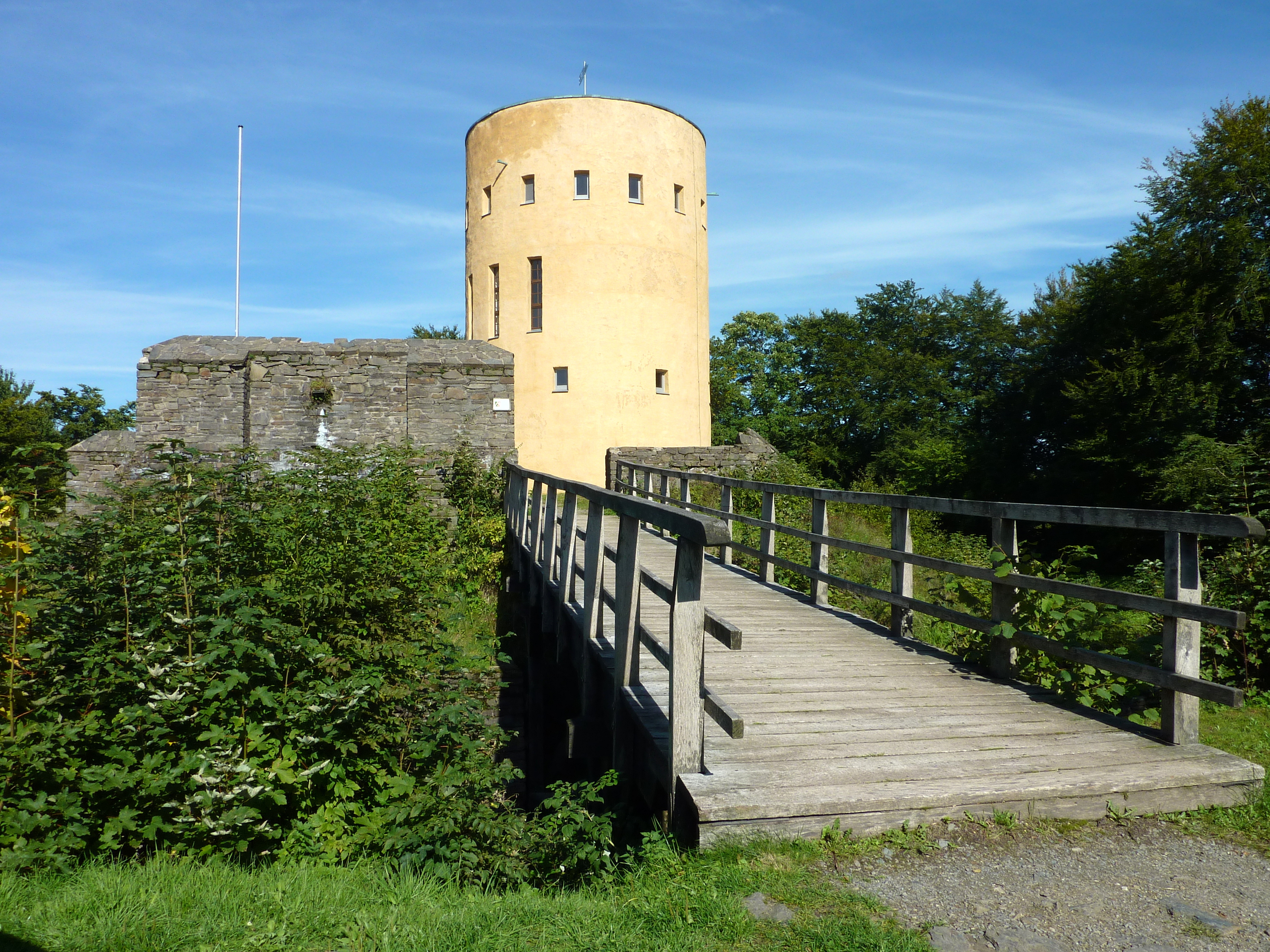
Ginsburg Castle. Photo: Frank Behnsen, 2010.

John 'the Younger' thus received the entire inheritance, and the provisions of the will made in favour of William and John Maurice remained a dead letter. However, on 13/23 January 1624, John 'the Younger' voluntarily ceded the sovereignty over the Hilchenbach district with Ginsburg Castle and some villages belonging to the Ferndorf and Netphen districts, to William. With the exception of John Maurice and George Frederick, the younger brothers accepted only modest appanages. Henceforth, until 1645, the county of Nassau-Siegen had two governments, one in Siegen, the other in Hilchenbach. However, for a short period (1632–1635) this situation underwent a temporary change: during the Thirty Years' War, his brothers, who were fighting on the Protestant side, rebelled against John 'the Younger'.

Count Louis Henry of Nassau-Dillenburg entered the service of King Gustavus II Adolphus of Sweden on 1 December 1631, who had landed in Germany on 24 June 1630 to intervene in favour of the Protestants in the Thirty Years' War. Countess Dowager Margaret, through the mediation of Louis Henry, turned to Gustavus Adolphus and asked for help against the machinations of her stepson John 'the Younger'. On 14 February 1632 the Swedish king sent an order from Frankfurt to Louis Henry to provide military support for his first cousin John Maurice. Louis Henry then occupied the city of Siegen with his regiment of Dutch and Swedish soldiers. One day later, on 29 February, John Maurice and his brother Henry arrived in Siegen. Just as John 'the Younger' had kept his cavalry in reserve eight years earlier, now John Maurice and Henry, supported by the presence of the Swedish regiment, negotiated with the citizens, who felt bound by the oath they had sworn to John 'the Younger'. On 4 March, after long and difficult negotiations, the citizens paid homage to John Maurice and Henry. John Maurice obtained for himself not only the Freudenberg district, which his father had intended for him in the will of 1621, but also Netphen, which had been intended for John 'the Younger' in the same will. William was not only confirmed in the possession of Hilchenbach, but also received Ferndorf and Krombach, as stipulated in his father's will. The city of Siegen paid homage to William and John Maurice only, who only in 1635 re-admitted their elder brother John 'the Younger' into co-sovereignty. However, the latter soon restored the old order: in 1636, he again became the sole owner of his father's property, with the exception of Hilchenbach, which he left to William, and he again governed the city of Siegen alone. John Maurice was again excluded from the county's sovereignty. However, in 1642 he inherited the territory from his brother William in accordance with his father's will.

John 'the Younger' died in Ronse on 27 July 1638. His only son John Francis Desideratus was born in Nozeroy on 28 July 1627. His mother acted as regent until his marriage in 1651. He made several attempts to obtain the whole Siegerland. In 1646 he visited the Emperor in Vienna to protest against his uncle John Maurice's seizure of the county. On 22 January 1645, after his return from Brazil, the latter, with his brothers George Frederick and Henry and an 80-man entourage, had forcibly occupied Siegen Castle and on 15 February had received the renewed homage from the citizens, albeit this time only for two thirds of the county. In order to end the constant dispute, John Maurice wanted to adhere strictly to his father's will of 1621 and leave his nephew John Francis Desideratus the one third that was due to him. Already before his departure to Brazil, on 25 October 1635, he had explicitly authorised his subjects to recognise the then still living John 'the Younger' as co-ruler. In 1645 John Maurice relinquished his rights to the Freudenberg district, granted by the will of 1621, in favour of his brother George Frederick. John Francis Desideratus was unsuccessful with the Emperor in Vienna, and two years later, at the Congress of Westphalia, Emperor Ferdinand III ratified the fiercely contested 1621 will of John 'the Middle'. This left John Francis Desideratus only the Catholic third part, which is still known today as Johannland. John Maurice held both the other thirds in his hand, because his brother William had already died and left him his third part, and George Frederick had ceded all his rights to John Maurice in 1649. It was therefore the latter who continued to administer the Freudenberg district.

=== Death, burial and succession ===
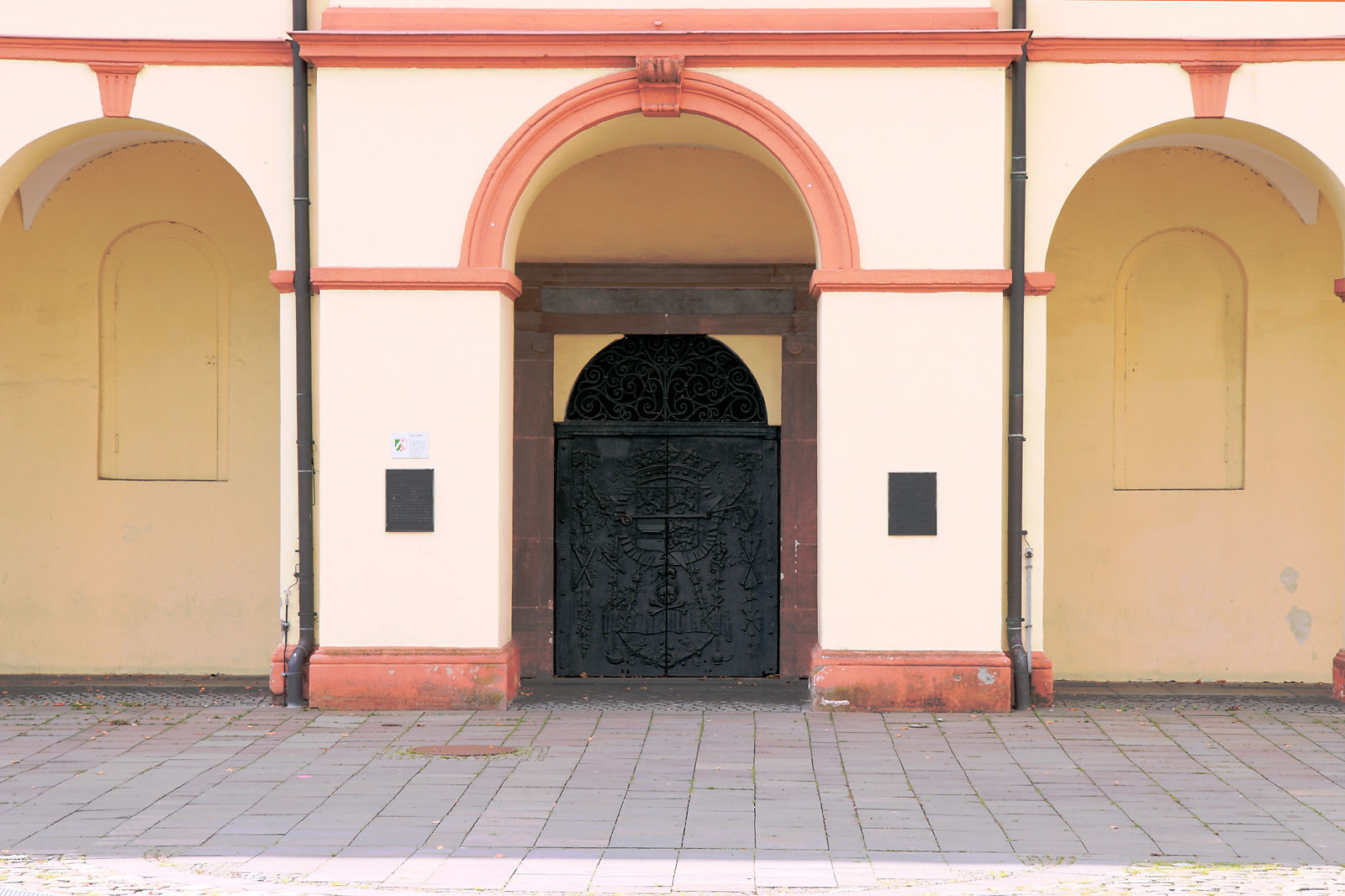
The entrance to the Fürstengruft in Siegen. Photo: Bob Ionescu, 2009.

George Frederick died in Bergen op Zoom on 2 October 1674. (Note: "Europäische Stammtafeln wrongly states that he died in June 1674. For his death, see: a. official death notification in Bergen op Zoom on 2-10-1674 in State Archives Wiesbaden (130^{II}, 2200); b. official notification dated Bergen op Zoom 2‑10‑1674 in State Archives Wiesbaden (130^{II}, 2380^{III} c): «Ableben … diessen Morgen zwischen 3 u. 4 Uhren»; c. death register of the city of Bergen op Zoom for the year 1674: «1674 october 2. den governeur Graef Frits».") He was first buried in Terborg and later reburied in the Fürstengruft in Siegen. As governor of Bergen op Zoom, George Frederick was succeeded by his distant relative, Count Walrad of Nassau-Usingen.

== Marriage ==
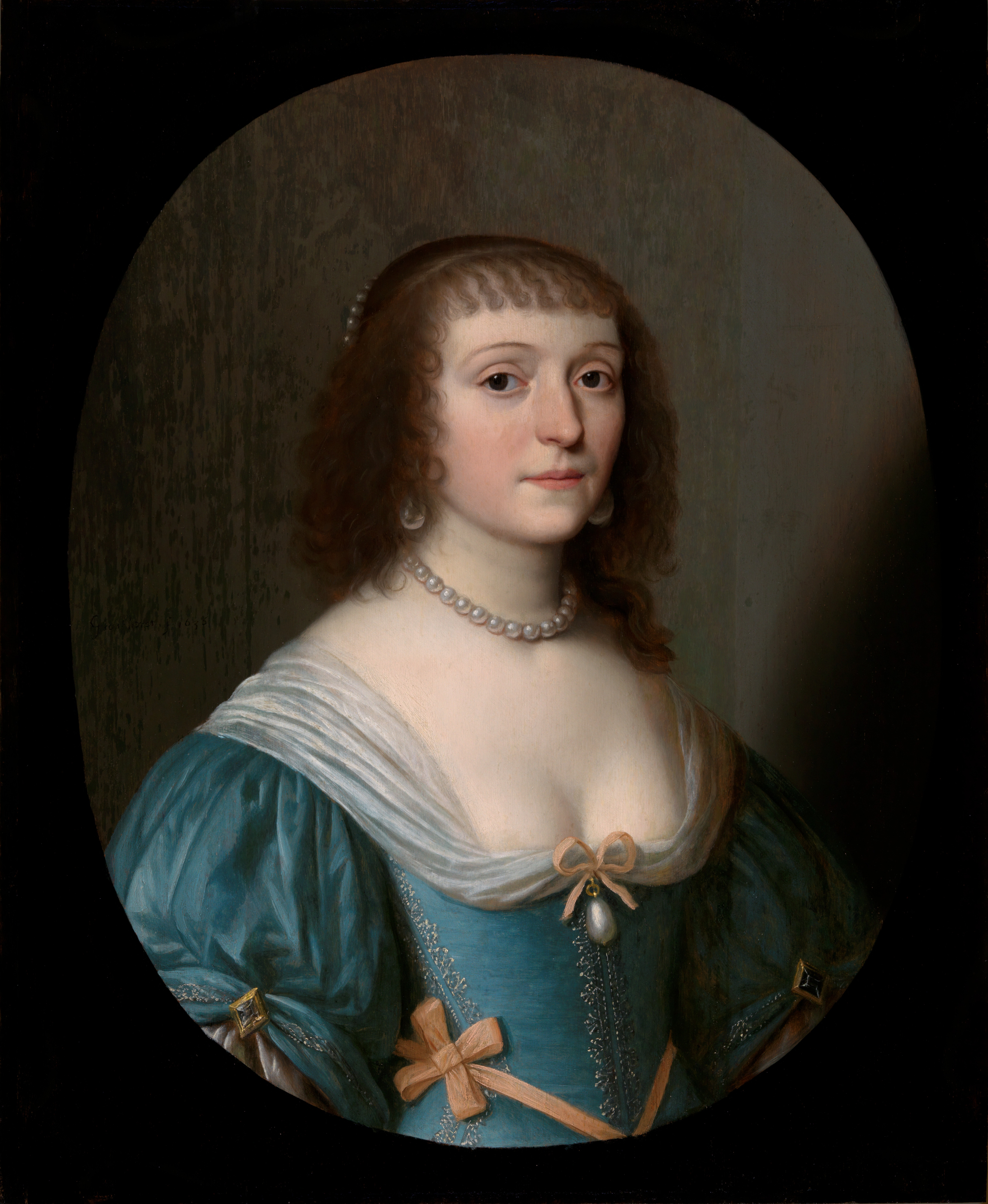
Princess Mauritia Eleonora of Portugal. Portrait by Gerard van Honthorst, 1636. Royal Dutch Collections, The Hague.

George Frederick married in The Hague (Note: Huberty, et al. (1981), p. 234 and Dek (1968), p. 249 do not mention the place of marriage. Dek (1968), p. 245 puts the place of marriage between brackets with a question mark. The marriage is mentioned in the marriage register of the Kloosterkerk in The Hague, see: Frederick of Nassau-Siegen and Eleonora Mauritia of Portugal (church marriage).jpg.) on 4 June 1647 to his second cousin Mauritia Eleonora of Portugal (Note: Menk (2004), p. 192, Huberty, et al. (1981), pp. 234–235, Dek (1970), p. 89, Dek (1968), p. 249, Blok (1911), p. 926 and Vorsterman van Oyen (1882), p. 119 call her Mauritia Eleonora. Van Ditzhuyzen (2004), p. 87 and Dek (1968), p. 245, call her Eleonora Mauritia. Lück (1981), p. 100 and Poelhekke (1979), p. 547 call her Mauritia. Kooijmans (2000), p. 66 calls her Eleonora Mauritia of Crato instead of Princess of Portugal, and states that she was called Mauke.) (baptised Delft, 10 May 1609 – Bergen op Zoom, 15 June 1674 (Note: "Europäische Stammtafeln situates her death in 1679. Dek (1962) does not know the place of death, but Dek (1970) says «gest. Bergen op Zoom 16 juni 1674» (in contrast to 25 June in Dek (1962)). See for this death: a. the death registers of the city of Bergen op Zoom: «1674. Junius 16 de heer Governeur vrau». This is probably the date of the funeral, because: b. notification sent by the husband from Bergen op Zoom 15 June 1674 in State Archives Wiesbaden (130^{II}, 2201): «Eleonora Mauritia, Fürstin zu Nassau-Siegen, geb. Prinzessin von Portugal, heute, zwischen 3 u. 4 Uhren nachmittags»; c. two other death announcements, identical to the previous one, in State Archives Wiesbaden (130^{II}, 2380^{III} e).")), the fifth daughter of Prince Manuel of Portugal and Countess Emilia of Nassau, the youngest daughter of Prince William I of Orange and Duchess Anna of Saxony. The marriage remained childless.

== Illegitimate child ==
George Frederick had one illegitimate daughter: Margaretha Sofia of Nassau (d. The Hague, 24 April 1737). She married in Terheide on 30 June 1669 to Johan Fer from 's-Hertogenbosch, secretary of the Prince of Orange. He was buried in The Hague on 13 August 1696.

== Ancestors ==
Ancestors of George Frederick of Nassau-Siegen
Great-great-grandparents	John V of Nassau-Siegen (1455–1516) ⚭ 1482; Elisabeth of Hesse-Marburg (1466–1523)	Bodo III 'the Blissful' of Stolberg-Wernigerode (1467–1538) ⚭ 1500; Anne of Eppstein-Königstein (1481–1538)	John IV of Leuchtenberg (1470–1531) ⚭ 1502; Margaret of Schwarzburg-Blankenburg (1482–1518)	Frederick V 'the Elder' of Brandenburg-Ansbach (1460–1536) ⚭ 1479; Sophia of Poland (1464–1512)	Frederick I of Denmark (1471–1533) ⚭ 1502; Anne of Brandenburg (1487–1514)	Magnus I of Saxe-Lauenburg (?–1543) ⚭ 1509; Catherine of Brunswick-Wolfenbüttel (?–1563)	Philip I of Brunswick-Grubenhagen (ca. 1476–1551) ⚭ 1517; Catherine of Mansfeld (1501–1535)	George I of Pomerania (1493–1531) ⚭ 1513; Amalie of the Palatinate (1490–1524)
Great-grandparents	William I 'the Rich' of Nassau-Siegen (1487–1559) ⚭ 1531; Juliane of Stolberg-Wernigerode (1506–1580)		George III of Leuchtenberg (1502–1555) ⚭ 1528; Barbara of Brandenburg-Ansbach (1495–1552)		Christian III of Denmark (1503–1559) ⚭ 1525; Dorothea of Saxe-Lauenburg (1511–1571)		Ernest V of Brunswick-Grubenhagen (1518–1567) ⚭ 1547; Margaret of Pomerania (1518–1569)	
Grandparents	John VI 'the Elder' of Nassau-Siegen (1536–1606) ⚭ 1559; Elisabeth of Leuchtenberg (1537–1579)				John 'the Younger' of Schleswig-Holstein-Sonderburg (1545–1622) ⚭ 1568; Elisabeth of Brunswick-Grubenhagen (1550–1586)			
Parents	John VII 'the Middle' of Nassau-Siegen (1561–1623) ⚭ 1603; Margaret of Schleswig-Holstein-Sonderburg (1583–1658)							

== Sources ==
- Aßmann, Helmut & Menk, Friedhelm (1996). Auf den Spuren von Nassau und Oranien in Siegen (in German). Siegen: Gesellschaft für Stadtmarketing Siegen e.V.
- Behr, Kamill (1854). Genealogie der in Europa regierenden Fürstenhäuser (in German). Leipzig: Verlag von Bernhard Tauchnitz.
- Blok, P.J. (1911). "George Frederik, Georg Friedrich". In Molhuysen, P.C. & Blok, P.J. (eds.). Nieuw Nederlandsch Biografisch Woordenboek (in Dutch). Vol. Eerste deel. Leiden: A.W. Sijthoff. p. 926.
- Dek, A.W.E. (1962). Graf Johann der Mittlere von Nassau-Siegen und seine 25 Kinder (in German). Rijswijk: Krips Repro.
- Dek, A.W.E. (1968). "De afstammelingen van Juliana van Stolberg tot aan het jaar van de Vrede van Münster". Spiegel der Historie. Maandblad voor de geschiedenis der Nederlanden (in Dutch). 1968 (7/8): 228–303.
- Dek, A.W.E. (1970). Genealogie van het Vorstenhuis Nassau (in Dutch). Zaltbommel: Europese Bibliotheek.
- Van Ditzhuyzen, Reinildis (2004) [1992]. Oranje-Nassau. Een biografisch woordenboek (in Dutch) (3rd ed.). Haarlem: Becht. ISBN 90-230-1124-4.
- von Ehrenkrook, Hans Friedrich; Förster, Karl & Marchtaler, Kurt Erhard (1928). Ahnenreihen aus allen deutschen Gauen. Beilage zum Archiv für Sippenforschung und allen verwandten Gebieten (in German). Görlitz: Verlag für Sippenforschung und Wappenkunde C.A. Starke.
- Huberty, Michel; Giraud, Alain & Magdelaine, F. & B. (1981). l'Allemagne Dynastique (in French). Vol. Tome III: Brunswick-Nassau-Schwarzbourg. Le Perreux: Alain Giraud.
- Huberty, Michel; Giraud, Alain & Magdelaine, F. & B. (1994). l'Allemagne Dynastique (in French). Vol. Tome VII: Oldenbourg-Familles alliées H-L. Le Perreux-sur-Marne: Alain Giraud.
- Kooijmans, Luuc (2000). Liefde in opdracht. Het hofleven van Willem Frederik van Nassau (in Dutch). Amsterdam: Uitgeverij Bert Bakker. ISBN 90-351-2201-1.
- Lück, Alfred (1981) [1967]. Siegerland und Nederland (in German) (2nd ed.). Siegen: Siegerländer Heimatverein e.V.
- Lück, Alfred & Wunderlich, Hermann (1956) [1952]. Die Fürstengruft zu Siegen (in German). Siegen: Verkehrsverein Siegen e.V.
- Menk, Friedhelm (1967). "Johann der Mittlere, Graf zu Nassau-Siegen (1561–1623) und seine zweite Gemahlin". Siegerland (in German). Band XLIV (Heft 1): 1–28.
- Menk, Friedhelm (1967). "Wilhelm Graf zu Nassau-Siegen (1592–1642)". Siegerland (in German). Band XLIV (Heft 2): 53–59.
- Menk, Friedhelm (1971). Quellen zur Geschichte des Siegerlandes im niederländischen königlichen Hausarchiv (in German). Siegen: Stadt Siegen/Forschungsstelle Siegerland.
- Menk, Friedhelm (1979). "Johann Moritz Fürst zu Nassau-Siegen". Siegerland (in German). Band LVI (Heft 1–2): 1vv.
- Menk, Friedhelm (2004). "Die Fürstengruft zu Siegen und die darin von 1669 bis 1781 erfolgten Beisetzungen". In Burwitz, Ludwig; Menk, Friedhelm; Opfermann, Ulrich Friedrich; Pfau, Dieter & Plaum, Bernd D. (eds.). Siegener Beiträge. Jahrbuch für regionale Geschichte (in German). Vol. 9. Siegen: Geschichtswerkstatt Siegen – Arbeitskreis für Regionalgeschichte e.V. pp. 183–202. ISSN 1431-6684.
- Poelhekke, J.J. (1978). Frederik Hendrik, Prins van Oranje. Een biografisch drieluik (PDF) (in Dutch). Zutphen: De Walburg Pers. ISBN 90-6011-443-4.
- Schutte, O. (1979). "Genealogische gegevens". In Tamse, C.A. (ed.). Nassau en Oranje in de Nederlandse geschiedenis (in Dutch). Alphen aan den Rijn: A.W. Sijthoff. pp. 40–44, 224–228. ISBN 90-218-2447-7.
- Spielmann, Christian (1909). Geschichte von Nassau (Land und Haus) von den ältesten Zeiten bis zur Gegenwart (in German). Vol. Teil 1. Politische Geschichten. Wiesbaden: P. Plauen.
- Textor von Haiger, Johann (1617). Nassauische Chronik (in German). Herborn: Christoph Raab.
- Vorsterman van Oyen, A.A. (1882). Het vorstenhuis Oranje-Nassau. Van de vroegste tijden tot heden (in Dutch). Leiden/Utrecht: A.W. Sijthoff/J.L. Beijers.

George Frederick of Nassau-Siegen House of Nassau-Siegen (Protestant branch) Born: 23 February 1606 Died: 2 October 1674
Political offices
Preceded by Louis of Nassau-Beverweerd	Governor of Bergen op Zoom; 1658 – 1674	Succeeded by Walrad of Nassau-Usingen
