= Countess Emilia of Nassau =

German noblewoman

Countess Emilia
- Princess of Portugal (disputed)
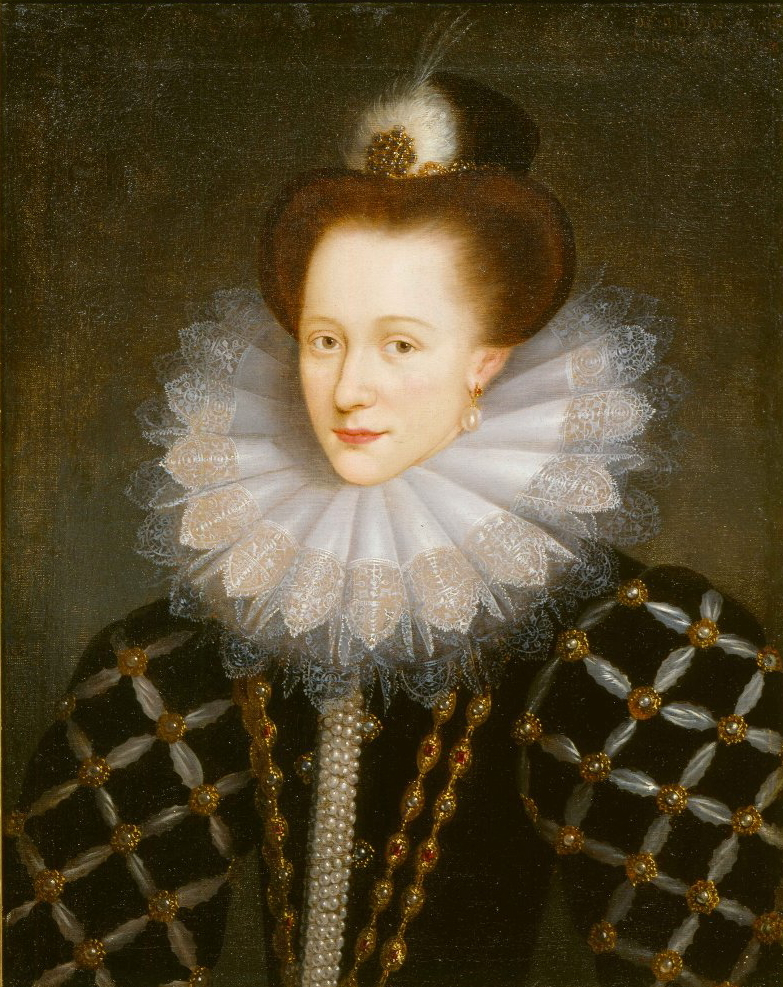
- Portrait of Countess Emilia by Daniël van den Queborn in c. 1590–95
- Born: 10 April 1569; Cologne
- Died: 16 March 1629 (aged 59); Geneva
- Spouse: Manuel of Portugal
- Issue: Maria Belgica of Portugal; Manuel António of Portugal; Emilia Louise of Portugal; Christopher William Louis of Portugal; Anna Louise of Portugal; Juliana Catherine of Portugal; Mauritia Eleonora of Portugal; Sabina Delphica of Portugal
- House: Orange-Nassau
- Father: William the Silent
- Mother: Anna of Saxony

Countess Emilia of Nassau (10 April 1569 – 16 March 1629) was the third and youngest daughter of William the Silent and his second wife Anna of Saxony.

== Biography ==
Emilia was born in Cologne. She is named after Amalia of Neuenahr who was in charge of her mother's household at the time of her birth. Emilia's mother had an affair with the father of painter Peter Paul Rubens. Due to this infidelity Emilia and her siblings, Anna and Maurice, were taken out of their mother's care and went to live with their uncle John VI, Count of Nassau-Dillenburg at Dillenburg. Emilia later went to live in Delft with her father and, in Friesland, with her sister, Anna.

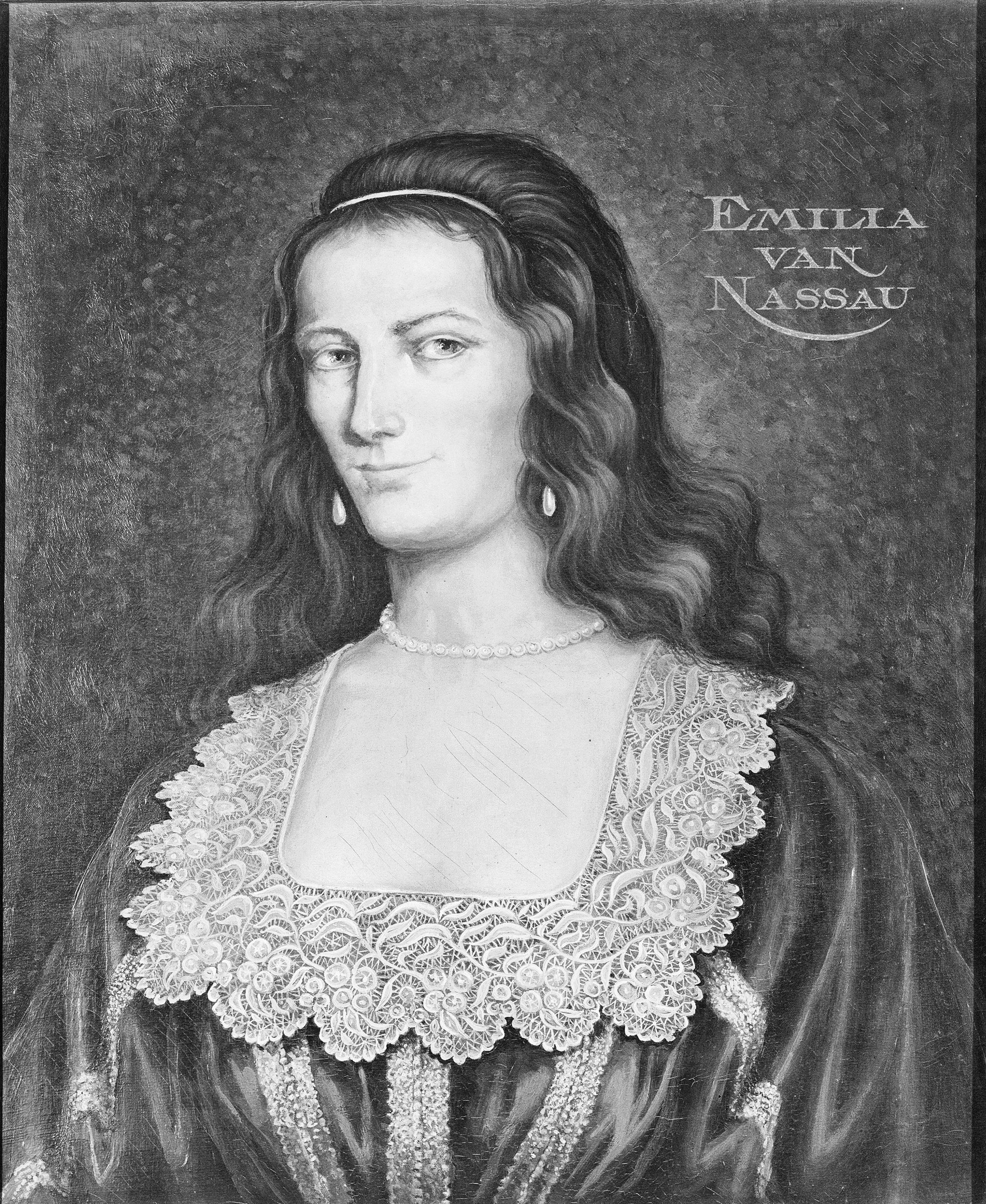
Emilia of Nassau

After her father's death she acted as hostess at the court of her brother, Maurice. It was on one of those occasions that she met Dom Manuel of Portugal, son of the Avis claimant of the Portuguese throne, António, Prior of Crato). She secretly married him in 1597 in The Hague. Maurice was firmly opposed to the marriage, because the Nassaus were Calvinists and Dom Manuel was a Catholic. Maurice put Emilia under house arrest; Dom Manuel had to flee to Wesel. When Maurice found he could not convince her to divorce her husband, he banished her from court for ten years. They eventually made peace and she and Dom Manuel were at Maurice's deathbed.

Emilia and her husband had ten children. The last years of their lives, they lived separately when her husband decided — due to financial concerns — to live in Brussels at the court of Isabella of Spain, archenemy of the House of Orange. Emilia went to Geneva with her daughters, where she died three years later, at the age of 59.

== Children ==
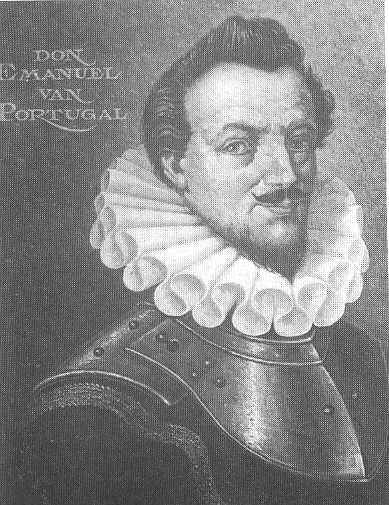
Dom Manuel of Portugal

- Maria Belgica of Portugal (born before 12 October 1598 – 28 July 1647), married in June 1629 to Colonel Theodor Croll (died 1640 in Venice [murdered]), Lord of Prangins, Quartermaster general of Duke Odoardo Farnese, Duke of Parma.
- Manuel António of Portugal (24 February 1600 in Delft – 27 October 1666 in Schagen), married Johanna of Hanau-Münzenberg; two daughters.
- Emilia Louise of Portugal (June 1603 in Delft – 29 October 1670), unmarried.
- Christopher William Louis of Portugal (1604 – 7 July 1660); a military person, commander of the guards of Maurice of Nassau in 1624, Knight of Malta, married to Donna Anna Maria di Capece-Galeoti de Monteleone.
- Anna Louise of Portugal (born before 3 May 1605 – 5 April 1669), unmarried.
- Juliana Catherine of Portugal (c. 1607 – 22 June 1680 in Delft), unmarried.
- Mauritia Eleonora of Portugal (born before 10 May 1609 – 25 June 1674), married to Count George Frederick of Nassau-Siegen on 4 June 1647 in The Hague, no children.
- Sabina Delphica of Portugal (1612 – 20 July 1670), unmarried.

== Ancestry ==
Ancestors of Countess Emilia of Nassau

8. John V, Count of Nassau-Siegen
4. William I, Count of Nassau-Siegen
9. Elisabeth of Hesse-Marburg
2. William the Silent
10. Bodo III, Count of Stolberg-Wernigerode
5. Juliana of Stolberg-Wernigerode
11. Anna of Eppstein-Königstein
1. Emilia of Nassau
12. Henry IV, Duke of Saxony
6. Maurice, Elector of Saxony
13. Catherine of Mecklenburg
3. Anna of Saxony
14. Philip I, Landgrave of Hesse
7. Agnes of Hesse
15. Christine of Saxony
