= Mauritia Eleonora of Portugal =

Portuguese/Dutch princess (1609–1674)

- Princess of Nassau-Siegen
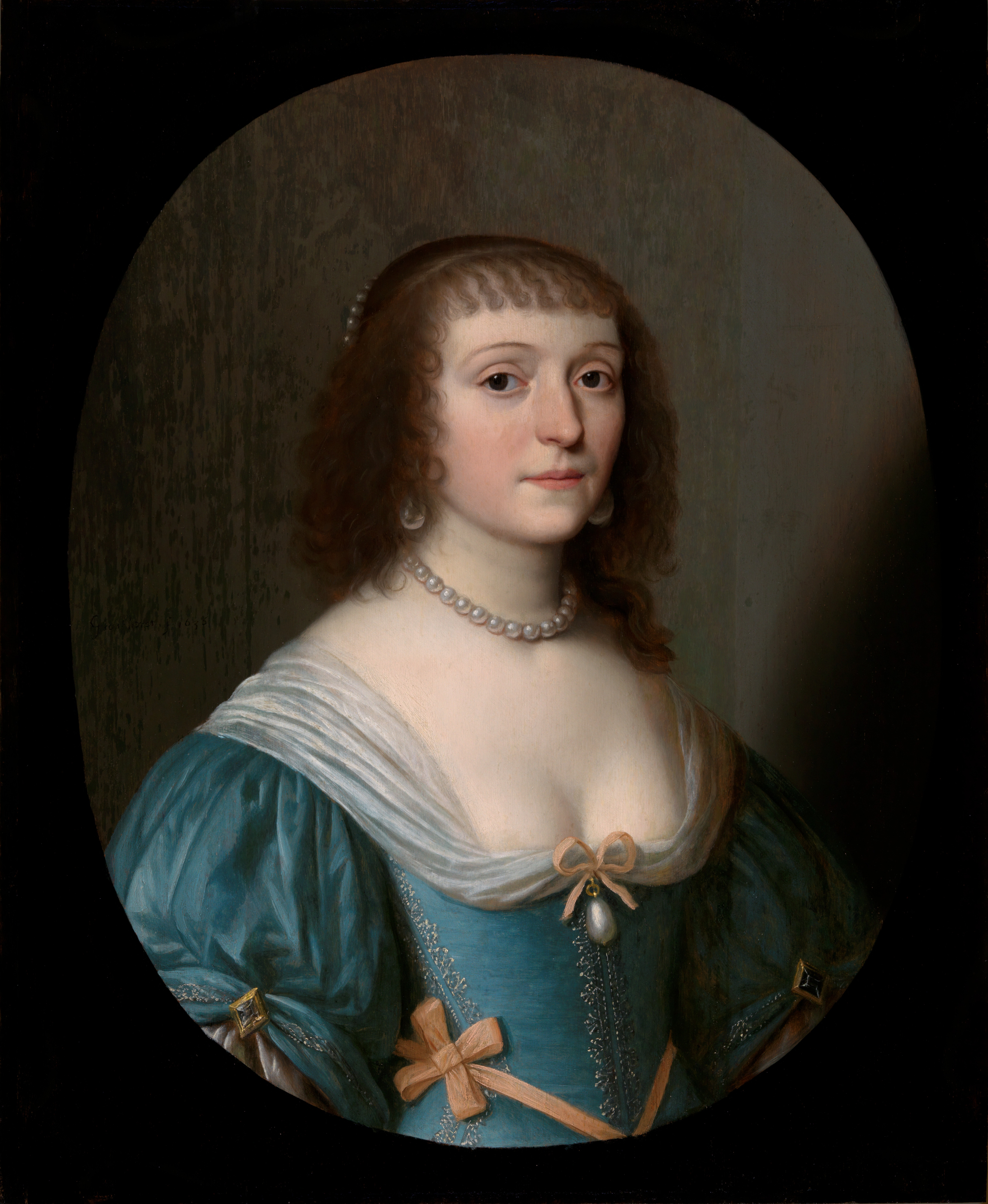
- Princess Mauritia Eleonora of Nassau-Siegen, nee Princess of Portugal. Portrait by Gerard van Honthorst, 1636. Royal Dutch Collections, The Hague.

- Coat of arms
- Full name: Mauritia Eleonora Princess of Portugal
- Native name: Mauritia Eleonora Prinses van Portugal
- Baptised: 10 May 1609; Delft
- Died: 15 June 1674; Bergen op Zoom
- Buried: 16 June 1674; Bergen op Zoom
- Noble family: House of Aviz
- Spouse: George Frederick of Nassau-Siegen
- Father: Manuel of Portugal
- Mother: Emilia of Nassau

Princess Mauritia Eleonora of Portugal (Note: Menk (2004), p. 192, Huberty, et al. (1981), pp. 234–235, Dek (1970), p. 89, Dek (1968), p. 249, Blok (1911), p. 926 and Vorsterman van Oyen (1882), p. 119 call her Mauritia Eleonora. Van Ditzhuyzen (2004), p. 87 and Dek (1968), p. 245, call her Eleonora Mauritia. Lück (1981), p. 100 and Poelhekke (1979), p. 547 call her Mauritia. Kooijmans (2000), p. 66 and Kooijmans (1998), p. 238 call her Eleonora Mauritia of Crato instead of Princess of Portugal, and states that she was called Mauke by her family.) (1609 – 15 June 1674), Dutch: Prinses Mauritia Eleonora van Portugal, was a princess from the House of Aviz. As a close relative of Prince Frederick Henry of Orange, she spent a long time at his court in The Hague. Later in life she married a count from the House of Nassau-Siegen.

== Ancestry and early life ==
Mauritia Eleonora was the fifth daughter and ninth of ten children of Manuel, Hereditary Prince and Countess Emilia of Nassau. Her father was the illegitimate son of António, Prior of Crato, pretender to the Portuguese throne during the succession crisis of 1580. Her mother was the youngest daughter of William the Silent from his second marriage. She was banished from her brother's court for her clandestine marriage to a Catholic (the House of Orange being Calvinists).

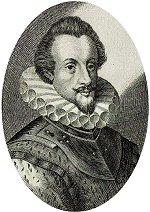
Prince Manuel of Portugal, Mauritia Eleonora's father.

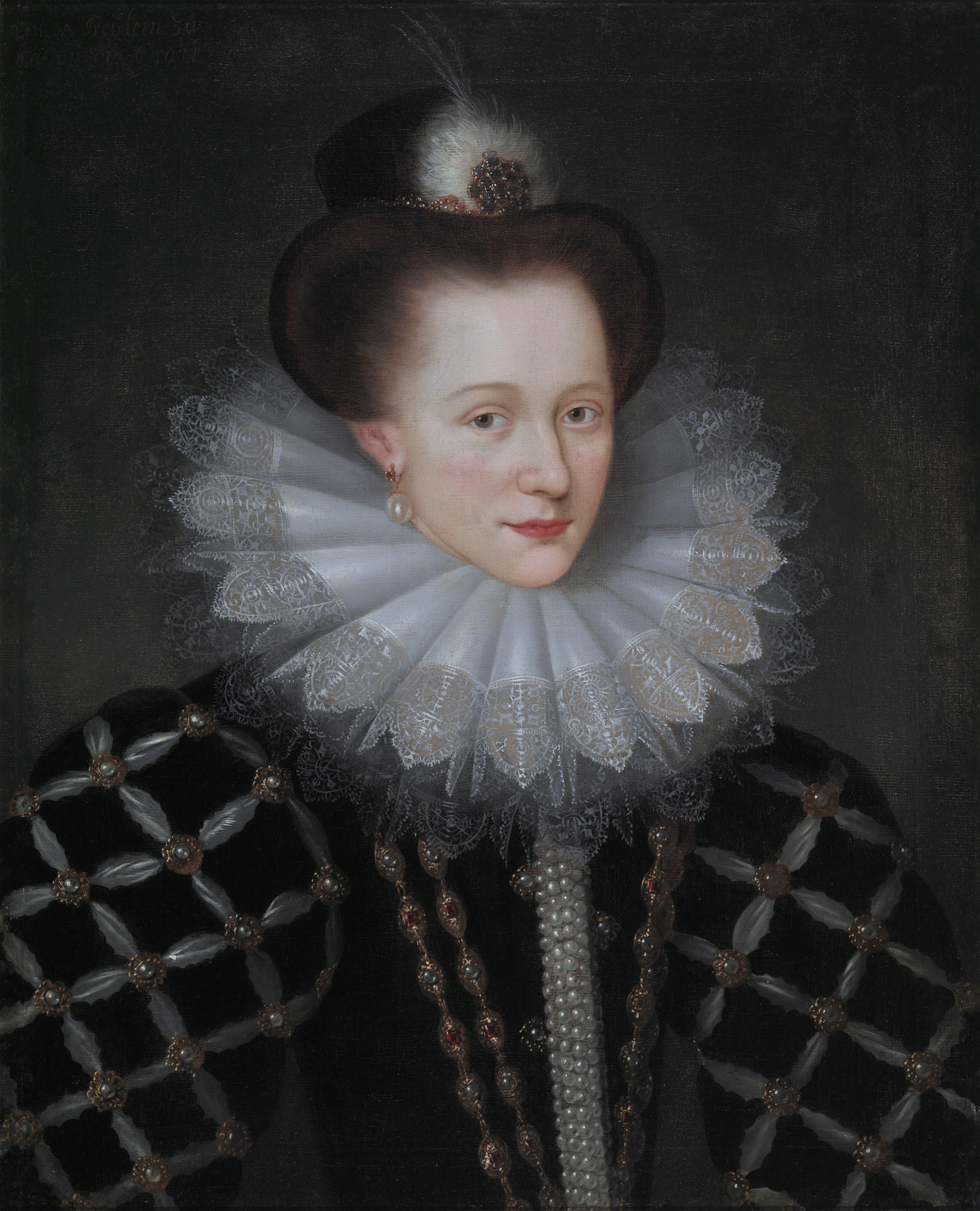
Countess Emilia of Nassau, Mauritia Eleonora's mother on a portrait by Daniël van den Queborn from between 1590 and 1595.

Where and when Mauritia Eleonora was born is unknown. She was baptised in Delft on 10 May 1609. She was named after her maternal uncle, Maurice, Prince of Orange, to celebrate the reconciliation between him and Mauritia Eleonora's mother.

The family lived at the Prinsenhof in Delft. In 1618 they moved to number 3 Lange Vijverberg in The Hague, opposite of the Stadtholder’s Court. In 1626, her father moved to the Brussels court of Isabella Clara Eugenia of Spain to escape his financial difficultues; her mother decided not to follow him there because of the enmity between the Houses of Orange and Habsburg (Emilia's father had been assassinated after Isabella Clara Eugenia's father offered a reward for it). Mauritia Eleonora went with her mother and sisters to Geneva.

== Life at her uncle's court ==
After her mother's death in 1629, she joined the court of her uncle Frederick Henry, Prince of Orange. She shared a room with Countess Louise Christine of Solms-Braunfels, the youngest sister of Frederick Henry's wife Amalia. Her second cousin, William Frederick, Prince of Nassau-Diez pursued good relations with her because of her close proximity with her cousin Louise Henriette whom he wanted marry. In November 1644, Mauritia Eleonora confirmed William Frederick's suspicion that Louise Henriette was secretly corresponding with Henri Charles de la Trémoïlle (Note: Henri Charles de la Trémoïlle was the eldest son of Henri de la Trémoïlle, Duke of Thouars, and Maria de La Tour d'Auvergne. His father was the eldest son of Claude de la Trémoïlle and Countess Charlotte Brabantine van Nassau, the fifth daughter of Prince William I 'the Silent' of Orange and Duchess Charlotte of Bourbon-Montpensier. His mother was the second daughter of Henri de La Tour d'Auvergne, Duke of Bouillon, and Countess Elisabeth of Nassau, the second daughter of Prince William I 'the Silent' of Orange and Duchess Charlotte of Bourbon-Montpensier. The parents of Henri Charles therefore were first cousins of each other and of Louise Henriette.) Prince of Talmont. William Frederick did not realise that Mauritia Eleonora's had ulterior motives for giving him biased information, and he was charmed by her.

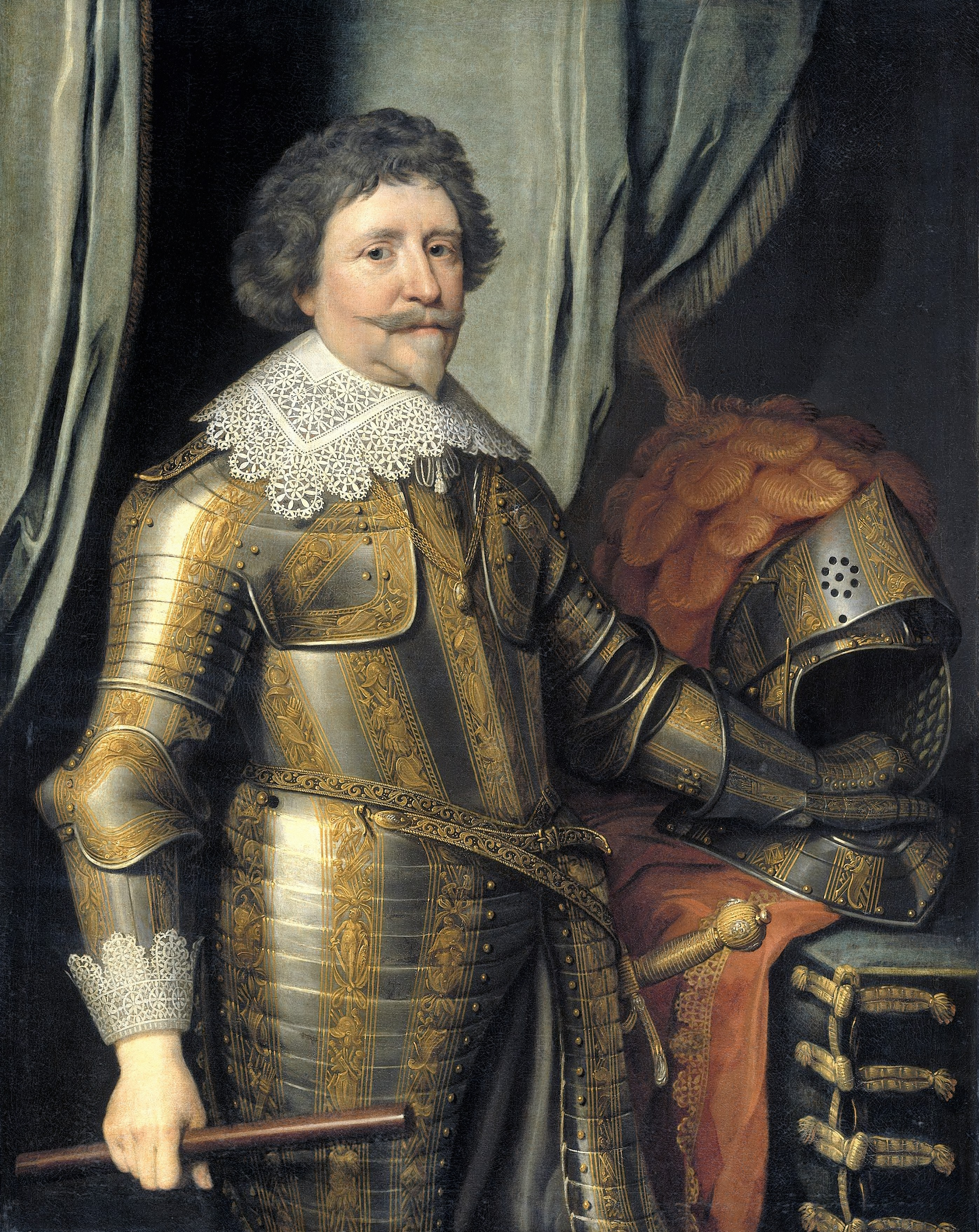
Prince Frederick Henry of Orange, Mauritia Eleonora's uncle. Portrait by Michiel Jansz van Mierevelt, ca. 1632–1640. Rijksmuseum, Amsterdam.

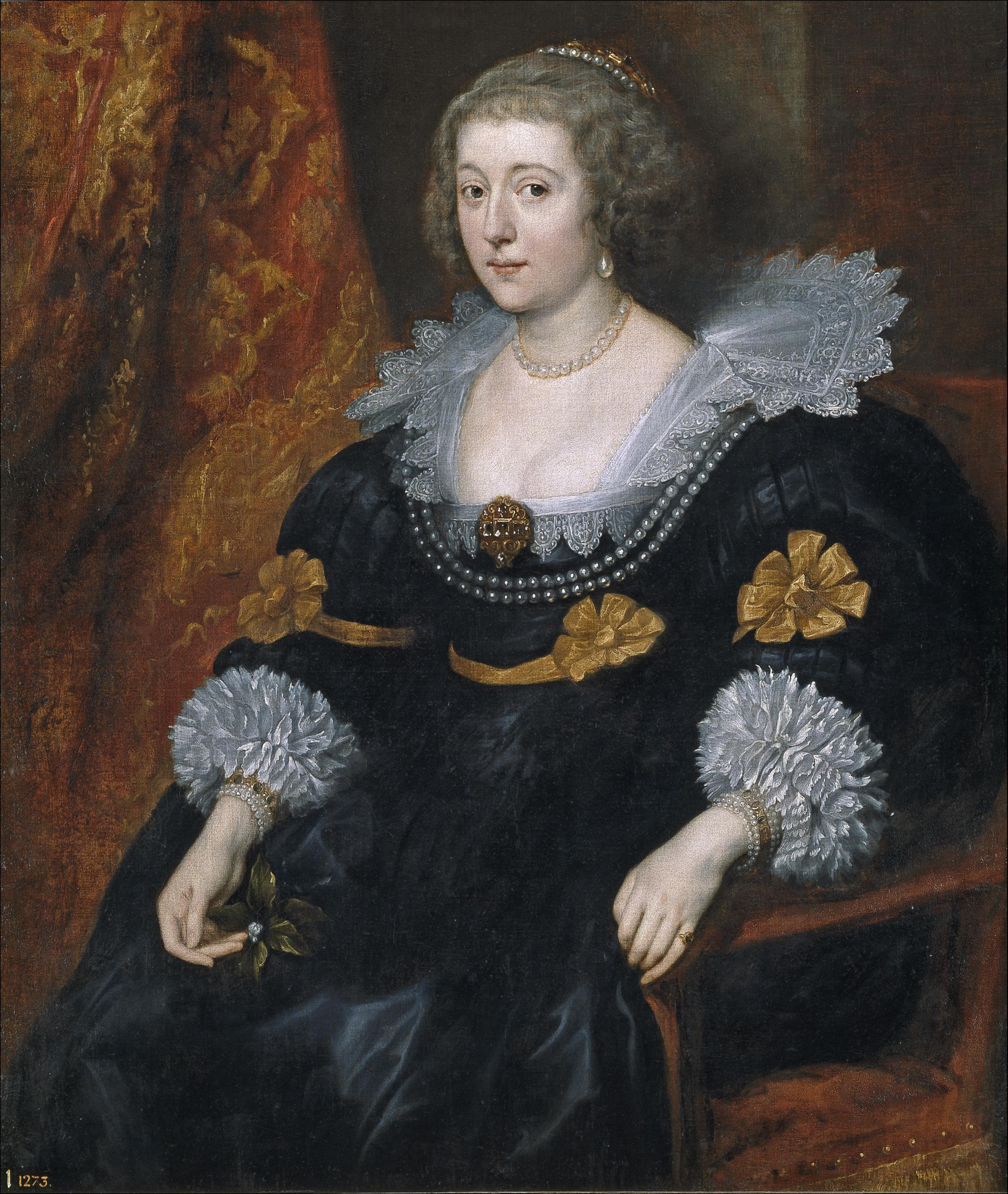
Countess Amalia of Solms-Braunfels, Mauritia Eleonora's aunt. Portrait by Anthony van Dyck, 1631–1632. Museo Nacional del Prado, Madrid.

Mauritia Eleonora declared that she had no friendship as sincere as the one with William Frederick. He asked her if she would marry him, to which she replied "that she would prefer to go with no one else", as she had never valued or trusted anyone as much as him. William Frederick assured her that whoever married her would be the happiest man on earth. He added that the only thing preventing him from proposing was his promise to his mother to marry one of the daughters of the Prince of Orange. There was plans that Mauritia Eleonora could marry another second cousin, John Maurice, Count of Nassau-Siegen, but she refused the match

In May 1645, the relationship between William Frederick and Mauritia Eleonora became strained as she realised that he would never marry her. In the same month, Louise Henriette quarreled with Mauritia Eleonora for gossiping about her and claiming that Louise Henriette looked too much at a certain man. This alarmed Louise Henriette, as her parents did not know about her romance with the Prince of Talmont.

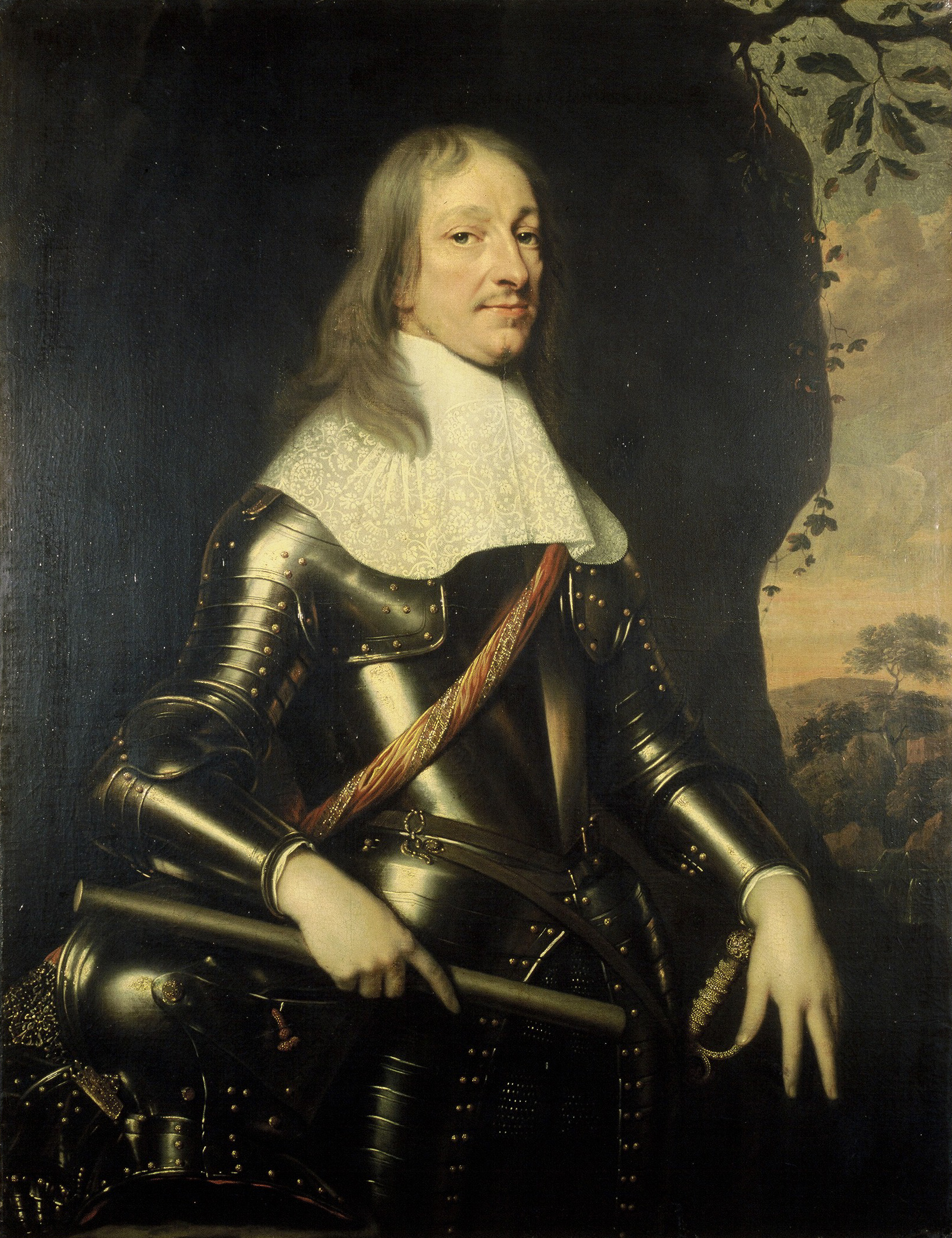
Count William Frederick of Nassau-Diez, stadholder of Friesland, Mauritia Eleonora's second cousin and desired husband on a portrait by Pieter Nason, from 1664.

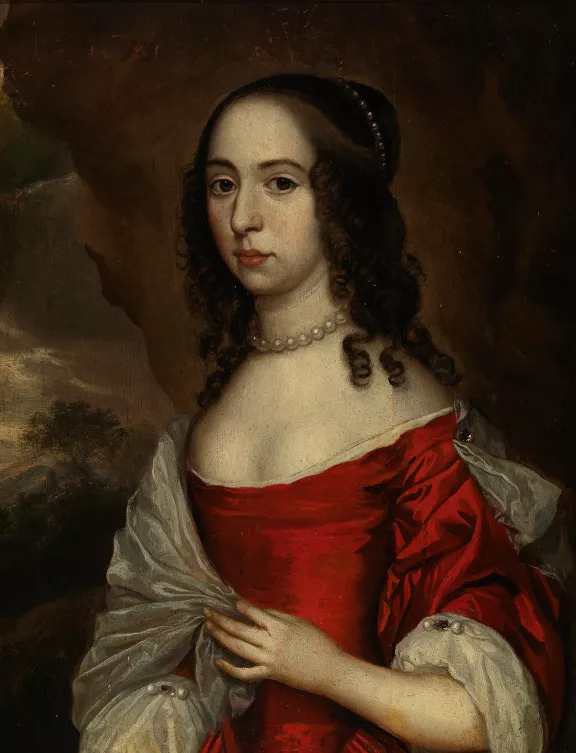
Countess Louise Henriette of Nassau, Mauritia Eleonora's first cousin on a contemporaneous portrait by Johannes Mijtens, 17th century.

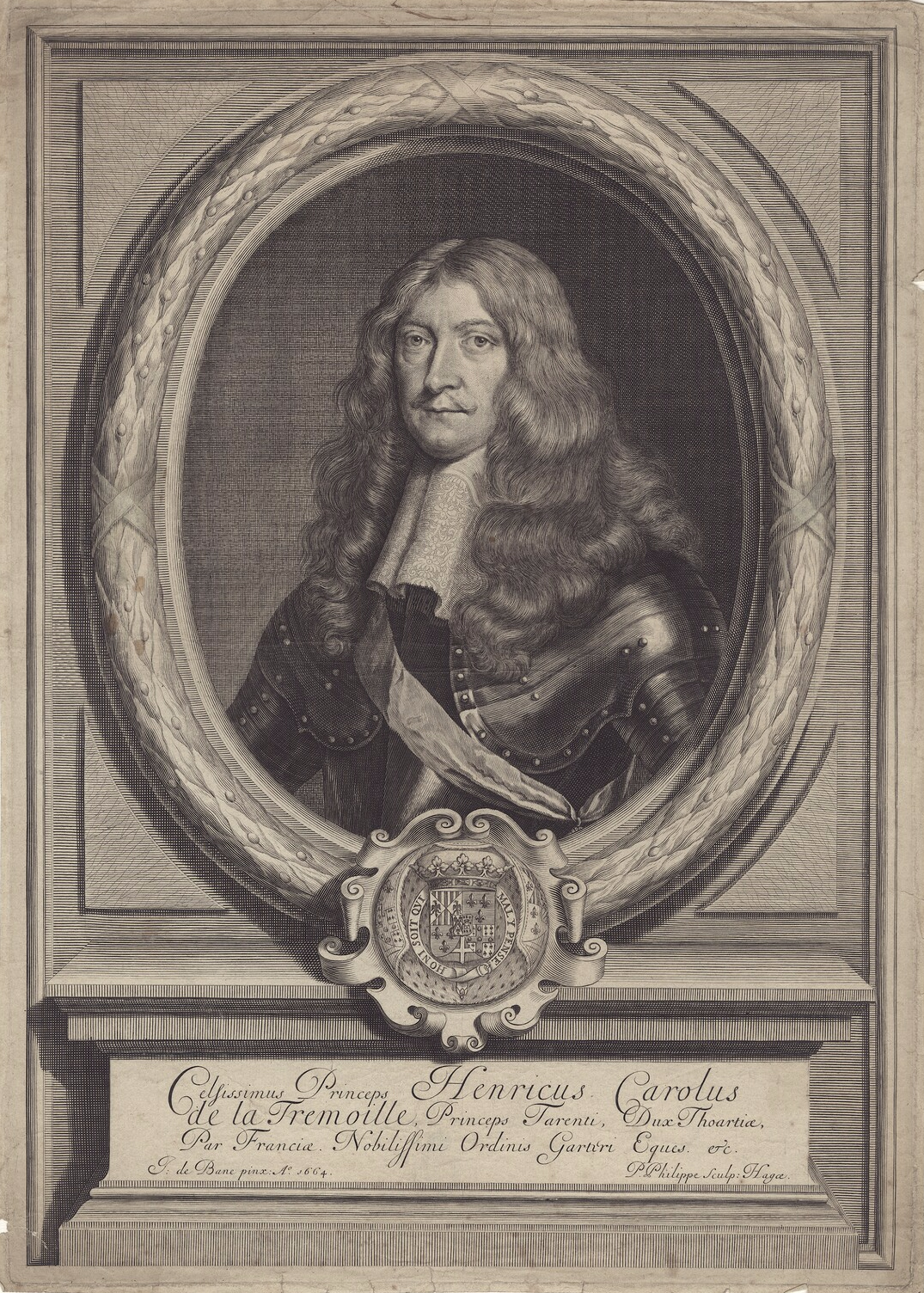
Henri Charles de la Trémoïlle, Prince of Talmont, Louise Henriette's lover on an engraving by Pieter Philippe, after a painting by Jan de Baen, from around 1664.

In the spring of 1646, Louise Henriette's mother Amalia noticed her close relationship with Talmont. As she wanted her daughter to marry Charles, Prince of Wales or Elector Frederick William of Brandenburg, she expressed her displeasure, to which Louise Henriette voiced her dislike of both Chalres and Frederick William. Fearing that she would somehow marry the Prince of Talmont, Amalia ordered Mauritia Eleonora to watch Louise Henriette closely. She did her job thoroughly, and Talmont complained that he could never be alone with Louise Henriette He explained Mauritia Eleonora's obedience to her aunt with her dependency: as an orphan in her mid-thirties with no assets, she needed Amalia's help to marry.

In September 1646, Mauritia Eleonora told Amalia about the secret correspondence between Louise Henriette and the Prince of Talmont and received her permission or order to obtain the letters. Louise Henriette, despite her lover's warnings, did not burn the letters, but kept them in a locked box in her locked cabinetry. When Mauritia Eleonora only found two letters, she had the locks broken by a blacksmith. She gave the letters to Amalia, and Talmont fell out of favour. Louise Henriette married Frederick William of Brandenburg in the same year.

== Marriage and later life ==
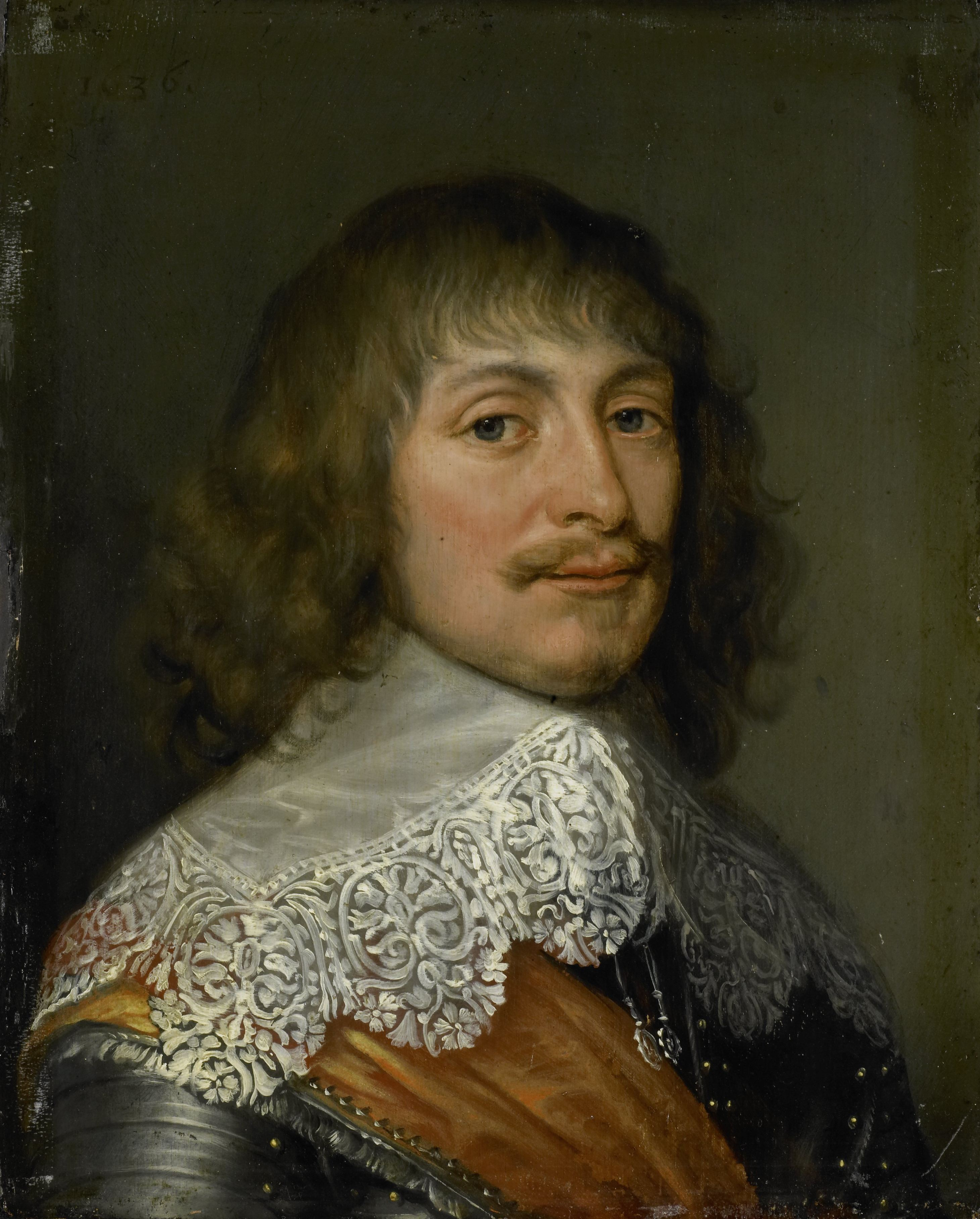
Prince George Frederick of Nassau-Siegen, Mauritia Eleonora's husband on nonymous portrait from 1636.

After this episode, Mauritia Eleonora was anxious to leave the court and marry, even to a man with no money. She trusted her uncle's sense of obligation to appoint her husband to some office. Amalia wanted to arrange her marriage with her nephew, Frederick, Burgrave of Dohna, but Mauritia Eleonora selected her second cousin, Count George Frederick of Nassau-Siegen instead. He was the second son of Count John VII of Nassau-Siegen and Margaret of Schleswig-Holstein-Sonderburg. He had served in the Dutch States Army, becoming captain of the infantry in 1627 and ritmeester of the cavalry in 1633. In 1637, he was promoted to major and in 1642 to colonel.

Mauritia Eleonora, aged thirty-eight, married George Frederick in The Hague (Note: Huberty, et al. (1981), p. 234 and Dek (1968), p. 249 do not mention the place of marriage. Dek (1968), p. 245 puts the place of marriage between brackets with a question mark. The marriage is mentioned in the marriage register of the Kloosterkerk in The Hague, see: Frederick of Nassau-Siegen and Eleonora Mauritia of Portugal (church marriage).jpg.) on 4 June 1647 In 1648 George Frederick became commander of Rheinberg and in 1658, governor of Bergen op Zoom. On 6 May 1664 he was made a prince of the Holy Roman Empire.

Mauritia Eleonora died in Bergen op Zoom on 15 June 1674, (Note: "Europäische Stammtafeln situates her death in 1679. Dek (1962) does not know the place of death, but Dek (1970) says «gest. Bergen op Zoom 16 juni 1674» (in contrast to 25 June in Dek (1962)). See for this death: a. the death registers of the city of Bergen op Zoom: «1674. Junius 16 de heer Governeur vrau». This is probably the date of the funeral, because: b. notification sent by the husband from Bergen op Zoom 15 June 1674 in State Archives Wiesbaden (130^{II}, 2201): «Eleonora Mauritia, Fürstin zu Nassau-Siegen, geb. Prinzessin von Portugal, heute, zwischen 3 u. 4 Uhren nachmittags»; c. two other death announcements, identical to the previous one, in State Archives Wiesbaden (130^{II}, 2380^{III} e).") where she was buried the next day. Their marriage had remained childless.

== Ancestors ==
Ancestors of Mauritia Eleonora of Portugal
| Great-great-grandparents | Manuel I 'the Fortunate' of Portugal (1469–1521) ⚭ 1500; Maria of Aragon (1482–1517) | Pedro Gómez (?–?) ⚭ ? (?–?) | ? (?–?) ⚭ ? (?–?) | ? (?–?) ⚭ ? (?–?) | John V of Nassau-Siegen (1455–1516) ⚭ 1482; Elisabeth of Hesse-Marburg (1466–1523) | Bodo III 'the Blissful' of Stolberg-Wernigerode (1467–1538) ⚭ 1500; Anna of Eppstein-Königstein (1481–1538) | Henry V 'the Pious' of Saxony (1473–1541) ⚭ 1512; Catherine of Mecklenburg (1487–1561) | Philip I 'the Magnanimous' of Hesse (1504–1567) ⚭ 1523; Christine of Saxony (1505–1549) |
| Great-grandparents | Louis of Portugal (1506–1555) extramarital affair with Violanta Gómez (1531–1595) | | ? (?–?) ⚭ ? (?–?) | | William I 'the Rich' of Nassau-Siegen (1487–1559) ⚭ 1531; Juliana of Stolberg-Wernigerode (1506–1580) | | Maurice of Saxony (1521–1553) ⚭ 1541; Agnes of Hesse (1527–1555) | |
| Grandparents | António of Portugal (1531–1595) extramarital affair with Anna Barbosa (?–?) | | | | William I 'the Silent' of Orange (1533–1584) ⚭ 1561; Anna of Saxony (1544–1577) | | | |
| Parents | Manuel of Portugal (1568–1638) ⚭ 1597; Emilia of Nassau (1569–1629) | | | | | | | |

== Sources ==
- Aßmann, Helmut & Menk, Friedhelm (1996). Auf den Spuren von Nassau und Oranien in Siegen (in German). Siegen: Gesellschaft für Stadtmarketing Siegen e.V.
- Becker, J. (1999). "Brederodes Haags huwelijksfeest – Voornaam vertoon". In Koenhein, A.J.M.; Brederoo, P.; Will, Chr.; Heniger, J.; Leeuwenberg, H.L.Ph. & Den Hertog, P.T. (eds.). Johan Wolfert van Brederode 1599-1655. Een Hollands edelman tussen Nassau en Oranje (in Dutch). Vianen/Zutphen: Historische Vereniging Het Land van Brederode/Uitgeversmaatschappij Walburg Pers. pp. 47–56. ISBN 90-5730-034-6.
- Behr, Kamill (1854). Genealogie der in Europa regierenden Fürstenhäuser (in German). Leipzig: Verlag von Bernhard Tauchnitz.
- Blok, P.J. (1911). "George Frederik, Georg Friedrich". In Molhuysen, P.C. & Blok, P.J. (eds.). Nieuw Nederlandsch Biografisch Woordenboek (in Dutch). Vol. Eerste deel. Leiden: A.W. Sijthoff. p. 926.
- Dek, A.W.E. (1962). Graf Johann der Mittlere von Nassau-Siegen und seine 25 Kinder (in German). Rijswijk: Krips Repro.
- Dek, A.W.E. (1968). "De afstammelingen van Juliana van Stolberg tot aan het jaar van de Vrede van Münster". Spiegel der Historie. Maandblad voor de geschiedenis der Nederlanden (in Dutch). 1968 (7/8): 228–303.
- Dek, A.W.E. (1970). Genealogie van het Vorstenhuis Nassau (in Dutch). Zaltbommel: Europese Bibliotheek.
- Van Ditzhuyzen, Reinildis (2004) [1992]. Oranje-Nassau. Een biografisch woordenboek (in Dutch) (3rd ed.). Haarlem: Becht. ISBN 90-230-1124-4.
- von Ehrenkrook, Hans Friedrich; Förster, Karl & Marchtaler, Kurt Erhard (1928). Ahnenreihen aus allen deutschen Gauen. Beilage zum Archiv für Sippenforschung und allen verwandten Gebieten (in German). Görlitz: Verlag für Sippenforschung und Wappenkunde C.A. Starke.
- Huberty, Michel; Giraud, Alain & Magdelaine, F. & B. (1981). l'Allemagne Dynastique (in French). Vol. Tome III: Brunswick-Nassau-Schwarzbourg. Le Perreux: Alain Giraud.
- Keblusek, Marika & Zijlmans, Jori (1997). Princely display. The court of Frederik Hendrik of Orange and Amalia van Solms. Zwolle: Waanders. ISBN 90-4009-195-1.
- Koenhein, A.J.M. & Heniger, J. (1999). "Johan Wolfert van Brederode 1599–1655 – 'In Opbloey neergetoghen'". In Koenhein, A.J.M.; Brederoo, P.; Will, Chr.; Heniger, J.; Leeuwenberg, H.L.Ph. & Den Hertog, P.T. (eds.). Johan Wolfert van Brederode 1599-1655. Een Hollands edelman tussen Nassau en Oranje (in Dutch). Vianen/Zutphen: Historische Vereniging Het Land van Brederode/Uitgeversmaatschappij Walburg Pers. pp. 9–46. ISBN 90-5730-034-6.
- Kooijmans, Luuc (1998). "Liefde in opdracht. Emotie en berekening in de dagboeken van Willem Frederik van Nassau". Historisch Tijdschrift Holland (in Dutch). 1998 (4/5). Haarlem: Historische Vereniging Holland: 231–255. ISBN 90-6550-040-5. ISSN 0166-2511.
- Kooijmans, Luuc (2000). Liefde in opdracht. Het hofleven van Willem Frederik van Nassau (in Dutch). Amsterdam: Uitgeverij Bert Bakker. ISBN 90-351-2201-1.
- Lück, Alfred (1981) [1967]. Siegerland und Nederland (in German) (2nd ed.). Siegen: Siegerländer Heimatverein e.V.
- Lück, Alfred & Wunderlich, Hermann (1956) [1952]. Die Fürstengruft zu Siegen (in German). Siegen: Verkehrsverein Siegen e.V.
- Menk, Friedhelm (1967). "Johann der Mittlere, Graf zu Nassau-Siegen (1561–1623) und seine zweite Gemahlin". Siegerland (in German). Band XLIV (Heft 1): 1–28.
- Menk, Friedhelm (1971). Quellen zur Geschichte des Siegerlandes im niederländischen königlichen Hausarchiv (in German). Siegen: Stadt Siegen/Forschungsstelle Siegerland.
- Menk, Friedhelm (1979). "Johann Moritz Fürst zu Nassau-Siegen". Siegerland (in German). Band LVI (Heft 1–2): 1vv.
- Menk, Friedhelm (2004). "Die Fürstengruft zu Siegen und die darin von 1669 bis 1781 erfolgten Beisetzungen". In Burwitz, Ludwig; Menk, Friedhelm; Opfermann, Ulrich Friedrich; Pfau, Dieter & Plaum, Bernd D. (eds.). Siegener Beiträge. Jahrbuch für regionale Geschichte (in German). Vol. 9. Siegen: Geschichtswerkstatt Siegen – Arbeitskreis für Regionalgeschichte e.V. pp. 183–202. ISSN 1431-6684.
- Naber, Johanna W.A. (1920). "Louise Henriette van Oranje. Keurvorstin van Brandenburg 1628-1667". Prinsessen van Oranje in Duitschland (in Dutch). Haarlem: H.D. Tjeenk Willink & Zoon. pp. 66–108.
- Poelhekke, J.J. (1978). Frederik Hendrik, Prins van Oranje. Een biografisch drieluik (PDF) (in Dutch). Zutphen: De Walburg Pers. ISBN 90-6011-443-4.
- Schutte, O. (1979). "Genealogische gegevens". In Tamse, C.A. (ed.). Nassau en Oranje in de Nederlandse geschiedenis (in Dutch). Alphen aan den Rijn: A.W. Sijthoff. pp. 40–44, 81–82. ISBN 90-218-2447-7.
- Textor von Haiger, Johann (1617). Nassauische Chronik (in German). Herborn: Christoph Raab.
- Vorsterman van Oyen, A.A. (1882). Het vorstenhuis Oranje-Nassau. Van de vroegste tijden tot heden (in Dutch). Leiden/Utrecht: A.W. Sijthoff/J.L. Beijers.
- Wendland, Anna (1902). Briefe der Elisabeth Stuart, Königin von Böhmen, an ihren Sohn, den Kurfürsten Carl Ludwig von der Pfalz, 1650-1662. Nach dem im königlichen Staatsarchiv zu Hannover befindlichen Originalen (in German). Tübingen: Litterarischen Verein in Stuttgart.
