= Maria Belgica of Portugal =

Dutch noble

- Born: Before 12 October 1598; Delft
- Died: 28 July 1647; Geneva
- Spouse: Theodor Croll
- Issue: Bern Theodore Croll; Emilia Catharina Croll; Anna Rosine Croll; Mauritia Sabine Croll; Helene Beatrix Croll; Susanne Sidonia Croll
- House: Aviz
- Father: Manuel, Hereditary Prince of Portugal
- Mother: Countess Emilia of Nassau

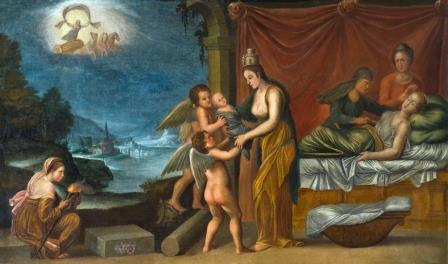
Layers of Maria Belgia. The City of Vevey is the godmother of the child. Allegorical painting painted by Claude de Villarzel and given in 1631 to the City of Vevey (Vevey Historical Museum)

Maria Belgica of Portugal, also known as Maria Belgica of Crato (born before 12 October 1598 – 28 July 1647), was the daughter of Manuel of Portugal, son of the self-proclaimed Portuguese king António of Crato, and Countess Emilia of Nassau (1569–1629), the youngest daughter of William of Orange from his second marriage.

== Life ==
Maria Belgica was born and raised in Delft. She must have been approximately 27-years-old when she moved to Geneva, Switzerland, with her mother and sisters. Soon after she arrived in Geneva she decided to return to The Hague to negotiate a stipend she was entitled to with her uncle Frederick Henry, Prince of Orange, and to request her inheritance from her aunt, Maria of Nassau, the Countess of Hohenlohe.

She negotiated a deal with her uncle and soon afterwards she returned to Geneva. Her mother died soon after Maria Belgica returned to her.

Maria Belgica married a Swiss colonel, Baron Croll, who originally came from Heidelberg, Germany, but had come to Geneva in the service of the Margrave of Baden-Durlach. The match was deemed unworthy of her, and her husband was seen as an opportunist. Croll was later given the title of Baron of Prangrins. The marriage was not a happy one, and a divorce was first approved and later rescinded by the government of Bern. Croll, however, was murdered in 1640 in Venice before any further decisions had been made. Maria Belgica died in Geneva in 1647. She was buried in the same chapel as her mother.

== Marriage and issue ==
Maria Belgica married Colonel Theodor Croll (died 1640 in Venice - stabbed to death), Baron Croll and Lord of Prangins, Quartermaster general of Odoardo Farnese, Duke of Parma, in June 1629. They had six children:

- Bern Theodore Croll, married Susanne Polier, daughter of Jan Pieter Polier, Lord of Bottens-Bauteren and Captain of the city of Lausanne. They had no children.
- Emilia Catharina Croll, married Claude d'Amond in 1653 and had a daughter, Juliana Catharina.
- Anna Rosine Croll, married Jean des Vignes, head of the court of Genoiller in 1653. They had two sons.
- Mauritia Sabine Croll, married Bernard Benedict des Champs, Lord of St. George, and had a son.
- Helene Beatrix Croll, died young.
- Susanne Sidonia Croll, married 1) Jean François Badel, Lord of Marthenay and Mansel, and 2) Vincent Ardin, Lord of Clavillière. She had children from both marriages.
