= Edward Harwood (military officer) =

Colonel Sir Edward Harwood
- Portrait of Sir Edward Harwood by the workshop of Jan van Ravesteyn
- Born: c.1586 Thurlby, Lincolnshire, Kingdom of England
- Died: October, 1632 (aged 45–46); Maastricht
- Burial place: Cloister Church, The Hague, The Netherlands
- Military career
- Allegiance: Kingdom of England / Dutch Republic
- Rank: Colonel
- Conflicts: Eighty Years' War; Siege of Ostend; Siege of Sluis; Siege of Rheinberg; Siege of Maastricht †; Thirty Years' War; Cádiz expedition
- Awards: Knight Bachelor

Sir Edward Harwood (c.1586–1632) was an English military officer who was known for his role as a commander in the fighting in the Netherlands during the Eighty Years' War, and for his religious views.

== Life ==
Arms of Harwood

He was born about 1586, in Thurlby a member of an old Lincolnshire family, and had an extended military career, entering Dutch service at age 13, gaining a company after combat at the Siege of Ostend. He took part in the Sluis campaign in 1604 under Horace Vere and was ranked captain by 1606 after the siege of Rheinberg. Around this time he attracted the favour of Prince Maurice of Nassau, captain-general of the United Provinces and future Prince of Orange, becoming one of his personal servants in the privy chamber. At some point in the years between his promotion to the position of captain and the Cleves-Jülich campaign of 1614 he was knighted. He became colonel of an English regiment in the Netherlands in 1622/3, by purchase from Viscount L'Isle; and was then one of the four standing colonels in the Low Countries. He was shot and mortally wounded at the Battle of La Felt during the siege of Maastricht on 11 August 1632, pierced through by three successive bullets. In 1636 one of his officers, Captain Nicholas Byron, erected a monument to his memory in the Hague where he was buried on the instructions of Prince Maurice. His brother George Harwood belonged to the Feoffees for Impropriations.

Harwood was known as a lay supporter of Puritanism. In Dutch affairs leading up to the Synod of Dort, and at that time lieutenant-colonel in Viscount L'Isle's regiment, he was briefing George Abbot. He intervened in 1622 to secure the appointment of William Ames at the University of Franeker; and he also supported John Burges. He was a significant international connection for Puritans.

Harwood signed the Second Virginia Charter of 1609. He was also involved in the Somers Isles Company, and was a charter member of the Providence Island Company.

== Death and legacy ==
Harwood died in 1632 during the Siege of Maastrict. In 1636, friends of Sir Edward Harwood had a memorial plaque erected in the Cloister Church in The Hague, where he was buried.

== Works ==
In 1642, his brother George Harwood, a merchant of London, published The Advice of Sir E. Harwood, written by King Charles his Command, upon occasion of the French King's preparation, and presented in his life time by his owne hand, to his Majestie: … also a Relation of his life and death, by Hugh Peters, &c., London. It was reprinted in Harleian Miscellany, ed. Park. Peters met Harwood around 1630, and may have acted as his chaplain.
