= Kloosterkerk, The Hague =

Coordinates: 52°04′54″N 4°18′34″E

- Kloosterkerk
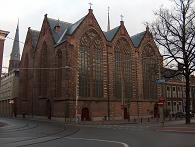
- The Kloosterkerk
- Kloosterkerk, The Hague
- Location: Lange Voorhout, The Hague
- Country: Netherlands
- Denomination: Protestant Church in the Netherlands
- Website: www.kloosterkerk.nl

History
- Dedication: (as former Catholic church) Vincent Ferrer

Architecture
- Functional status: active
- Heritage designation: Rijksmonument status

The Kloosterkerk (or Cloister Church) is a church on the Lange Voorhout in The Hague, Netherlands. The church and its accompanying monastery were first built in 1397. The church is known today as the church where Beatrix of the Netherlands occasionally attended services.

== History ==
Origins of the original monastery and church that occupied this site may be found in the Dominican Order. Reforms undertaken by Raymond of Capua, brought a renewed growth to the order, and it is around this time in 1397 that a monastery and church was first built for the Dominicans in The Hague.

=== Court of Albrecht of Bavaria ===
A thriving new centre of arts was established in The Hague by the Court of Albrecht of Bavaria and his second wife Margaret of Cleves. Some known artistic items to have been produced in this period are an important illuminated manuscript, the Hours of Margaret of Cleves commissioned between 1395–1400, and the visually similar Biblia pauperum. From December 1399, Dirc van Delf was among the court of the Duke Albrecht of Bavaria in The Hague. There he had the function of court chaplain, but he also lectured at German universities, such as Cologne and Erfurt.

=== Early architecture ===
In 1420 a fire raged through the monastery, but serious renovations were not recorded until the church's southern transept was added in the beginning of the 16th century. The church was expanded around 1540 with an enlarged aisle and side chapels. The centre barrel vaulted aisle is 20 metres high and 11.5 metres wide. The worship space became a pilgrimage church, where people could visit and pass through, while services were being held in the central aisle or nave. At this time the church was also dedicated to St. Vincent, a Valencian Dominican missionary who was canonized on 3 June 1455, by Pope Calixtus III.

=== Protestant reformation ===
It was stripped of Catholic decorations during the beeldenstorm (iconoclasm of 1566). A number of friars lived on for a few more years, but in 1574 the last few left. In 1583 most of the monastery was demolished. The church remained, but having been abandoned for 12 years, the building had deteriorated and some suggested demolition. In 1588 a cavalry company seeking shelter settled in the former church. The following year the nave and choir were made into a cannon foundry for the States of Holland and West Friesland. The choir was used as a foundry and the nave served as a munition store with the two walled off from each other. On 3 November 1690, the ammunition stored in the nave exploded leaving only one wall of the monastery remaining. (Note: Incidentally, this wall was included in the new building of the Dutch Court of Audit.)

=== Early protestant church ===
A part of the building became a church again in 1617 after Counter-Remonstrants had successfully "squatted" in it. The Protestant Church in the Netherlands had split between the Remonstrants and Counter-Remonstrants over Arminianism. The Grote Kerk in The Hague was in the hands of the Remonstrant party, led by minister Johannes Wtenbogaert and supported by statesman Johan van Oldenbarneveldt. The Counter-Remonstrants, led by suspended minister Henricus Roseaus, took possession of the Kloosterkerk and commenced their own preaching services there in July 1617. Later that same month, Maurice of Nassau, Prince of Orange demonstrated his support for the Counter-Remonstrants (and opposition to Van Oldenbarneveldt) by attending one of their services. Van Oldenbarneveldt was arrested in 1618 and executed a year later. The Remonstrants were expelled from their churches but the Kloosterkerk continued in use as a second city church alongside the Grote Kerk. For the centuries to follow the church was used for Dutch Reformed worship with the pulpit standing against the north wall.

In 1620 a mechanical clock was added to the tower, made by Huyck Hopcoper. Throughout the 17th century, the burial of people in the church brought money and numerous hatchments (Dutch:"rouwbord"). Most walls and columns were covered with hatchments, with the graves predominantly in the choir. A lead coffin was found in the choir with the embalmed remains of the foundress of the monastery, Margaret of Cleves.

=== 20th century: restoration and renewal ===
Towards the end of the 19th century, the consistory (church council) of the Dutch Reformed Church in The Hague divided the city into several wards or neighbourhoods. Each ward was allocated to one of the city ministers who was responsible for the pastoral care of the members of the Church living within the ward boundaries. The Kloosterkerk was in Ward XI which ran from the Lange Voorhout to the eastern boundary of the city. For 34 years (1894–1928) the ward minister was Willem Leonard Welter (1849–1940) who was also Court Chaplain from 1919 to 1928.

The city ministers continued to preach in all the churches in turn. In 1911 the first liturgical service of the Dutch Reformed Church was held in the Kloosterkerk under the direction of Welter’s colleague Jan Hendrik Gerretsen (1867–1923), but services were suspended in 1912 due to the dilapidated and dangerous condition of the building. Proposals were made to demolish the church and sell the plot to release funds for building a new church in the Duinoord area of the city. After strong objections were received the consistory agreed to fund the restoration of the building and services resumed in 1914.

The minister for Ward XI from 1929 to 1939 was Simon van Dorp (1880–1963) who belonged to the conservative Reformed Association within the Dutch Reformed Church. He founded the “Kloosterkerk-Benoordenhout” society to support church activities in his ward and opened the “Elim” church hall as a base for the society. The activities held in Elim included a Sunday School, Catechism classes and Bible lectures. Van Dorp took early retirement at the end of 1939. The consistory decided to split Ward XI between two adjacent wards and redeploy the vacant ministerial place to another part of the city. The Kloosterkerk ceased to be a neighbourhood church and the ward society became a city-wide society for Reformed Association members, still based at Elim but unconnected to the Kloosterkerk. There was further disruption when the Netherlands was occupied by German forces in May 1940 and no services were held in the Kloosterkerk during the winter months of 1940/41 and 1941/42.

A fresh start was made in 1942 when the congregation of the Duinoordkerk was forced to look for another building; their church had been demolished by order of the occupying Germans. The Kloosterkerk was made available, initially on a temporary basis but when it appeared that building a new church would be impossible, the congregation was allowed to settle there permanently. In 1952, the minister of the Duinoordkerk, Johannes Arnoldus Kwint (1900–1963), was transferred to the list of city ministers and given special responsibility for the Kloosterkerk. Between 1952 and 1957 the church was thoroughly renovated and the wall between the nave and choir was removed. Furniture and works of art which had been saved from the demolition of the Duinoordkerk and stored in the Peace Palace were placed in the Kloosterkerk, including

- the pulpit of oak (c. 1700) with Flemish carvings showing the Four Evangelists
- a stained glass window depicting the twelve apostles by Lou Asperslagh (1893–1949)
- the mosaic 'The Last Supper' from 1925 by Johan Thorn Prikker (1868–1932).

Rosettes in the ceiling are attributed to Gerhard Jansen (1868–1956). In 1966 an organ by Danish organ builder Marcussen was installed.

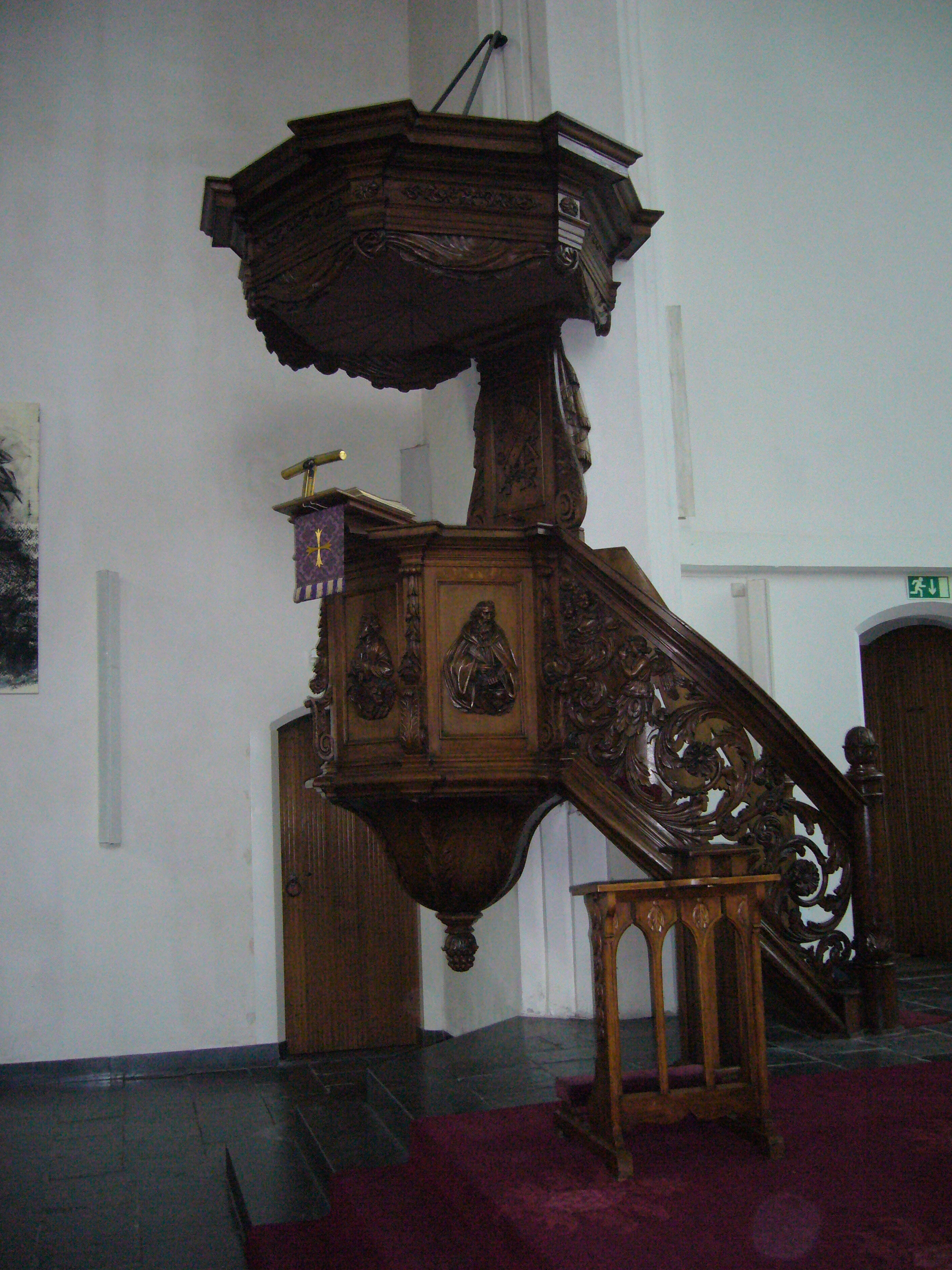
Pulpit

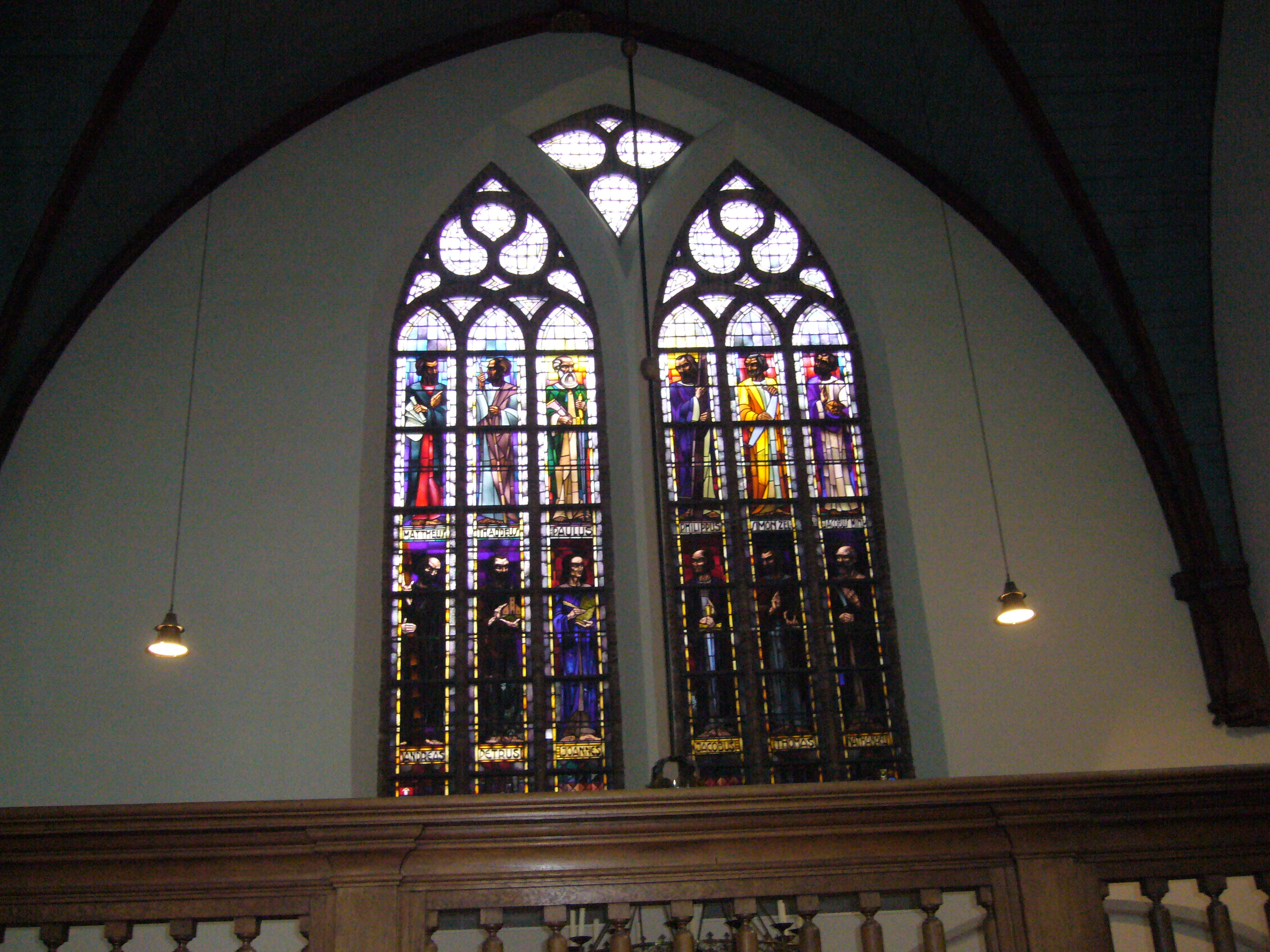
Chapel of the Apostles

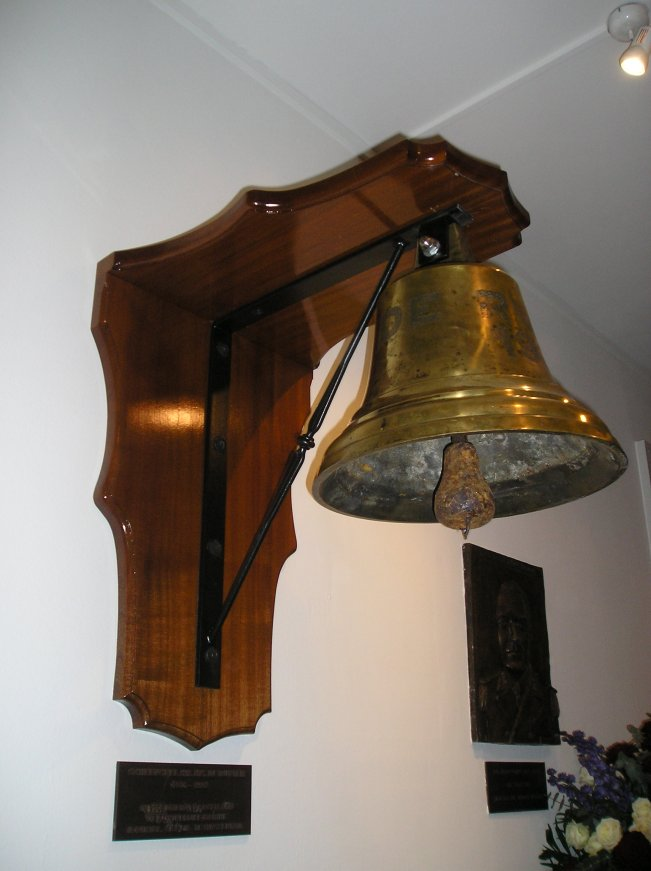
The bell from the De Ruyter, sunk in the Battle of the Java Sea – now in the church's porch

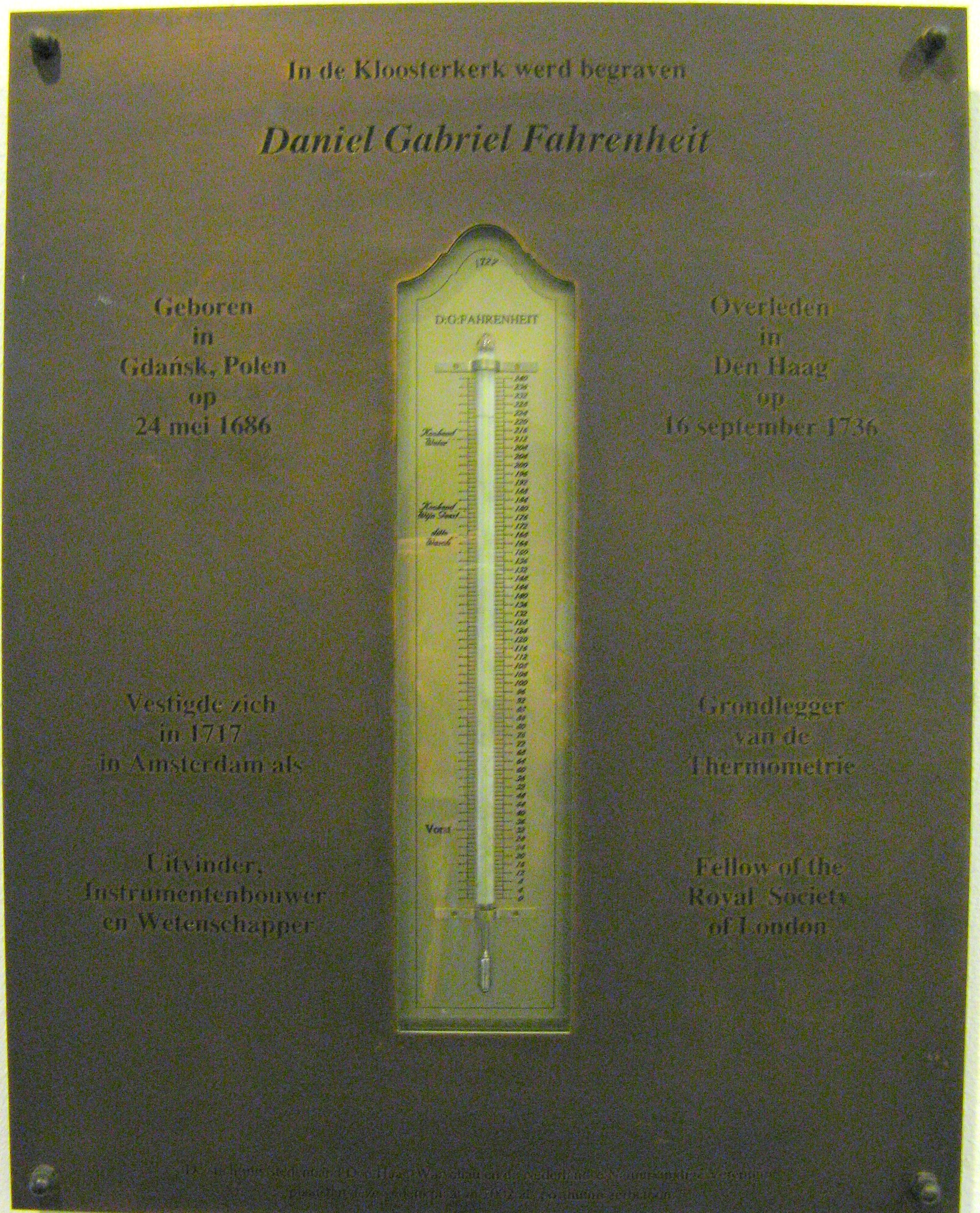
Memorial plaque of Daniel Gabriel Fahrenheit's burial site in the church's porch.

== Notable events ==
- From 1621 onward, the children of Frederick V of the Palatinate and Elizabeth Stuart had their children baptized at the Kloosterkerk.
- The wedding of Prince Frederick Henry and Amalia of Solms-Braunfels occurred at the Kloosterkerk in 1625.
- In 1646 Countess Louise Henriette of Nassau, the eldest daughter of Frederick Henry, Prince of Orange, married Frederick William, Elector of Brandenburg.
- In 1647 George Frederick of Nassau-Siegen married Mauritia Eleonora of Portugal.
- In 1657 Henry Casimir II, Prince of Nassau-Dietz was baptised in this church
- William III of England came to the Kloosterkerk in 1691 after he had been crowned king.
- In 1795, when French armies entered The Hague, a committee was established and met within the church walls where they planned to replace the Stadholder's family that had left for England.
- In 1813 a regiment of Cossack Army troops was temporarily housed in the church.
- The 16-year-old Queen Wilhelmina attended Communion for the first time in 1896. The day before she had been confirmed as a member of the Dutch Reformed Church at the Noordeinde Palace.
- In 1997 King Willem-Alexander had his Confession at this church.
- Princess Ariane of the Netherlands was baptised in this church in 2007.

== Notable burials ==
- Margaret of Cleves, wife of Albrecht of Bavaria
- John III, Duke of Bavaria, count of Holland and Hainaut
- Several children of Frederick V of the Palatinate and Elizabeth Stuart, who lived in exile in The Hague, were buried in this church.
- Colonel Sir Edward Harwood, English military officer who was known for his role as a commander in the fighting in the Netherlands during the Eighty Years' War, buried in the Kloosterkerk following his death at the Siege of Maastricht whilst in the service of the Dutch Republic
- Jacob Cats, poet and statesman; was buried in the Kloosterkerk in 1660 and has a memorial against a pillar inside the church still today.
- Pieter Post, Dutch Golden Age architect, painter and printmaker
- Joris van der Haagen, Dutch Golden Age painter
- Adriaen Hanneman, Dutch Golden Age painter
- Frederick Nassau de Zuylestein (buried 1673), general of the infantry, illegitimate son of Frederick Henry, Prince of Orange
- Rijcklof van Goens, Governor-General of the Dutch East Indies
- Daniel Gabriel Fahrenheit, for whom in 2002 a bronze commemorative plaque was unveiled by the Polish ambassador

== Church today ==
Today the Kloosterkerk is home of an energetic Protestant congregation. Every last Sunday of the month a cantata service is held in collaboration with the Residential Bach Orchestra and the Residential Chamber Orchestra or the Residential Bach Choir. Soloists, choir and orchestra are conducted by Jos Vermunt. Every first, third and any fifth Wednesday of the month a lunch-time concert is given by the Stichting Kunstcentrum Kloosterkerk.
