= Manuel António of Portugal =

Manuel António
- governor of Orange
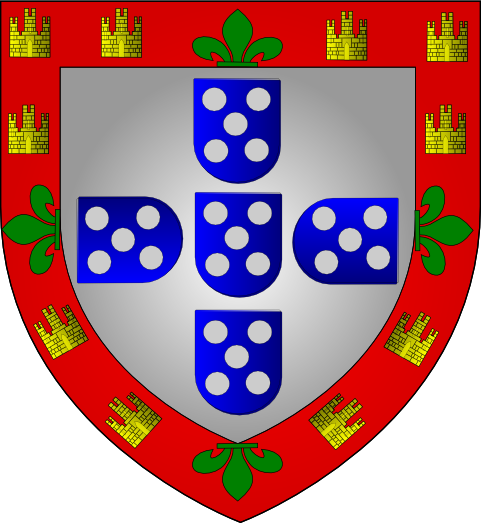
- Born: 24 February 1600; Delft
- Died: 27 October 1666 (aged 66); Schagen
- Spouse: Johanna of Hanau-Münzenberg
- Issue: Wilhelmina Amalia; Elisabeth Maria
- House: House of Aviz
- Father: Manuel, Hereditary Prince of Portugal
- Mother: Countess Emilia of Nassau

Manuel António of Portugal (24 February 1600 – 27 October 1666) was a Portuguese nobleman.

== Youth ==
He was born in Delft, the son of Manuel of Portugal and Countess Emilia of Nassau, who was a daughter of William the Silent. Manuel António's father, Manuel of Portugal, was an illegitimate son of the Portuguese pretender António, Prior of Crato.

Initially Manuel António was raised by his mother as a Calvinist. However, in 1612, his father sent him together with his brother Louis William to their uncle Christoph in France, where he received a Catholic education. Already in 1613, his uncle, the Stadtholder Maurice of Orange, promoted him as captain, because of the income associated with this position and not with the aim to take over a military command.

From 1619 – 1623 he was governor of the Principality of Orange for his uncle Maurice. Apparently in this respect it was relevant that he attended Catholic church services and that the majority of the population of the Principality of Orange was Catholic. The vice governor Valckenburg was in charge of official functions. He lived a lavish life, spend more money than was available and had to be ordered back early by his uncle in 1623. He continued to receive the corresponding pay of 6,000 Guilder until the next Stadtholder, Frederick Henry who ruled from 1625, cancelled the payments.

== Church and military ==
Without a source of income in 1626 he had to leave together with his father for Brussels in the Spanish Netherlands where they were cordially received. Manuel António started a military career as Rittmeister in service of Spain and at the archducal court.

This career was short-lived. On 15 July 1628 he joined — in presence of Isabella Clara Eugenia and all of her court — the Carmelites and took the religious name Felix a Santa Isabella. He joined the Carmelite monastery in Brussels where he was ordained. From 1628 to 1633 he was a priest but fled from the monastery back to Holland where on 15 January 1634 in Delft he converted again to Calvinism.

In 1638 he assumed the title Prince of Portugal and on 12 June 1638 he re-joined the service of the States-General as Rittmeister with the cuirassiers.

Shortly thereafter he was captured near Geldern by Cardinal-Infante Ferdinand of Austria and General Guillaume de Lamboy, taken to Brussels and — on his request — transferred to "his" monastery. But apparently this was only done under compulsion of captivity, as he escaped again, returned to Holland and converted again on 4 April 1643 to the Protestant faith.

== Marriage ==
On 14 December 1646 he married in Delft Countess Johanna of Hanau-Münzenberg-Schwarzenfels (1610 – 13 September 1673 in Delft), widow of Wild- and Rhinegrave Wolfgang Friedrich of Salm. This relation produced the following offspring:

- Wilhelmina Amalia (1647 – 14 November 1647)
- Elisabeth Maria (b. 20 November 1648 in Delft, d. 15 October 1717 in Vianen), married on 11 April 1678 with Lieutenant colonel Baron Adriaan of Gent (16 February 1645 in The Hague – 10 August 1708)

The sources point out that the countess — who descended from an impoverished branch of her family, which had been buffeted by the Thirty Years' War — brought little to the marriage. Debts weighed heavily on Manuel António and included child support of 300 fl. per year for his illegitimate son William (b. 1646) whose mother was one Dina Borremans.

== Late career ==
In 1645 he became Hauptmann of a Dutch company infantry and was soon promoted to Oberst. In 1656 he became governor of Steenwijk and Commandant of Elburg.

He died on 27 October 1666 in Schagen and was entombed in Delft.
