= Johanna of Hanau-Münzenberg =

German noblewoman

Countess Johanna of Hanau-Münzenberg (1610 – 13 September 1673) was a daughter of Count Albert of Hanau-Münzenberg-Schwarzenfels and Countess Ehrengard of Isenburg (1577 – 1637). Hanau-Münzenberg-Schwarzenfels was a cadet branch of Hanau-Münzenberg.

== Marriage ==
Johanna of Hanau-Münzenberg married twice:

1. From September 1637 with Wild- and Rhinegrave Wolfgang Friedrich of Salm (1589 – 24 December 1638). The marriage did not produce offspring.
2. on 14 December 1646 with Prince Manuel António of Portugal (1600 – 1666), a Dutch-Portuguese nobleman with family relationship to the House of Orange-Nassau. Their relation produced the following issue:
  1. Wilhelmina Amalia (1647 – 14 November 1647)
  2. Elisabeth Maria (20 November 1648 in Delft – 15 October 1717 in Vianen), married on 11 April 1678 with Lieutenant colonel Baron Adriaan of Gent (16 February 1645 in The Hague – 10 August 1708)

The sources point out that the countess brought in little to the marriage. Due to the Thirty Years' War, the lineage Hanau-Münzenberg-Schwarzenfels had become impoverished. Seemingly in 1633, the family had to escape from the Burg Schwarzenfels, first to Worms and later to Strasbourg where they struggled with financial problems. This explains her relatively advanced age for the first marriage.

== Ancestry ==
Ancestors of Johanna of Hanau-Münzenberg

16. Philip II, Count of Hanau-Münzenberg
8. Philip III, Count of Hanau-Münzenberg
17. Juliana of Stolberg
4. Philip Louis I, Count of Hanau-Münzenberg
18. John II, Count Palatine of Simmern
9. Countess Palatine Helena of Simmern
19. Beatrice of Baden
2. Albert of Hanau-Münzenberg
20. Henry VIII, Count of Waldeck
10. Philip IV, Count of Waldeck
21. Anastasia of Runkel
5. Magdalene of Waldeck-Wildungen
22. Salentin VII of Isenburg-Grenzau
11. Countess Jutta of Isenburg-Grenzau
23. Elisabeth of Hunolstein
1. Johanna of Hanau-Münzenberg
24. Louis II, Count of Isenburg-Büdingen
12. John, Count of Isenburg-Büdingen
25. Maria of Nassau-Wiesbaden
6. Philip II, Count of Isenburg-Büdingen
26. Günther XXXIX, Count of Schwarzburg-Blankenburg
13. Anna of Schwarzburg
27. Amalie of Mansfeld
3. Countess Ehrengard of Isenburg-Büdingen
28. Bernard II, Count of Solms-Braunfels
14. Philip, Count of Solms-Braunfels
29. Margaret of Henneberg
7. Countess Ehrengard of Solms-Braunfels
30. Otto IX, Count of Tecklenburg
15. Anna of Tecklenburg
31. Irmgard of Rietberg
