= Christian of Nassau-Siegen =

German count and officer in the Imperial Army (1616–1644)

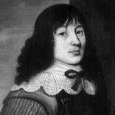
- Count Christian of Nassau-Siegen. Detail from a painting attributed to Wybrand de Geest, 1635–1640. Foundation Historical Collections of the House of Orange-Nassau, The Hague.

- Coat of arms
- Full name: Christian Count of Nassau-Siegen
- Native name: Christian Graf von Nassau-Siegen
- Born: Christian Graf zu Nassau, Katzenelnbogen, Vianden und Diez, Herr zu Beilstein; 16 July 1616; Siegen Castle
- Died: 1/11 April 1644 near Düren
- Buried: 4/14 June 1644; Fürstengruft, Evangelische Stadtkirche, Dillenburg; Reburied: unknown date Fürstengruft, Siegen
- Noble family: House of Nassau-Siegen
- Spouse: Anna Barbara von Quadt-Landskron-Rheinbach
- Issue: –
- Father: John VII 'the Middle' of Nassau-Siegen
- Mother: Margaret of Schleswig-Holstein-Sonderburg
- Occupation: Officer in the Hessian Army 1633, colonel of the cuirassiers in the Imperial Army 1642

Count Christian of Nassau-Siegen (16 July 1616 – 1/11 April 1644), German: Christian Graf von Nassau-Siegen, official titles: Graf zu Nassau, Katzenelnbogen, Vianden und Diez, Herr zu Beilstein, was a count from the House of Nassau-Siegen, a cadet branch of the Ottonian Line of the House of Nassau. He served as an officer in the Hessian Army and the Imperial Army successively.

== Biography ==
Christian was born at Siegen Castle (Note: The other sources that mention a place of birth, state Siegen as place of birth.) on 16 July 1616 as the sixth son of Count John VII 'the Middle' of Nassau-Siegen and his second wife, Duchess Margaret of Schleswig-Holstein-Sonderburg.

The will and testament of Count John VII 'the Middle' of 1621 bequeathed John Maurice and his younger brothers from their father's second marriage the district of Freudenberg, some villages in the Haingericht (Note: "The Haingericht was certainly located around the castle of Hainchen, which passed with its dependencies to the House of Nassau in 1313. See Historische Stätten Deutschlands III, 245.") and a third part of the administration of the city of Siegen. After his older half-brother John 'the Younger' had accepted the homage of the city of Siegen for the entire county of Nassau-Siegen on 12 January 1624 and had voluntarily ceded the sovereignty over the Hilchenbach district with Ginsburg Castle and some villages belonging to the Ferndorf and Netphen districts to his younger brother William on 13/23 January 1624, Christian and his brothers, with the exception of the oldest two brothers John Maurice and George Frederick, accepted only modest appanages.

Christian studied in Leiden in 1631. He attended the Siege of Maastricht in 1632. In 1633 he entered the Hessian service. He was wounded in the fight for Hanau in 1636. In 1642 he entered the Imperial Army and became colonel of the cuirassiers. He was killed in action near Düren on 1/11 April 1644 (Note: "Dek (1962) says he was killed in action in the battle at Neuss on 11‑4‑1644. But we find, in the Royal House Archive of the Netherlands (4/1499^{d}), a letter from the mother who from Siegen reported the death of her son. The name of the town of Neuss has been crossed out and replaced with that of Düren: «bei der Stadt Deuren in einem Treffen eine Meile wegs jenseits von Düren». Further on she clarifies «between Cologne and Düren on the Steinstrasse». The date of death is mentioned as 1/11‑4‑1644.") and was buried in the Fürstengruft in the Evangelische Stadtkirche in Dillenburg on 4/14 June 1644. At a hitherto unknown time his body was transferred to Siegen to be interred in the Fürstengruft there.

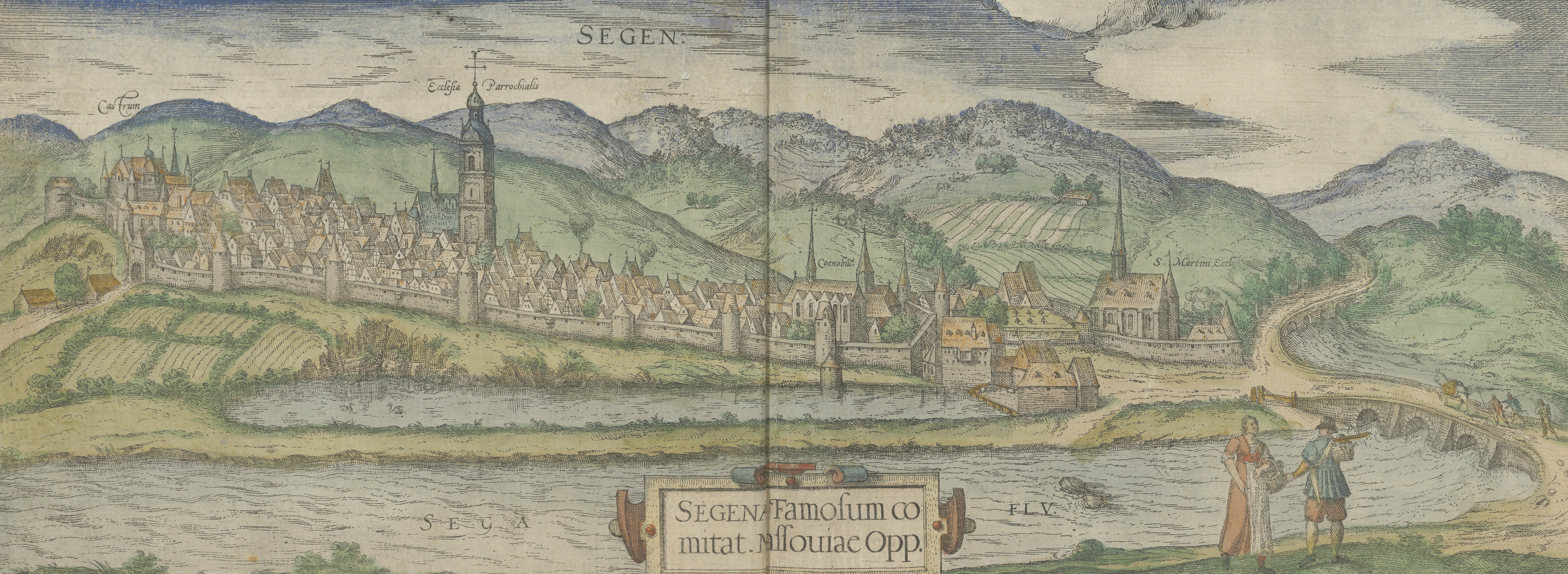
Siegen in 1617. From Braun & Hogenberg, Civitates orbis terrarum Band 6, Cologne, 1617. On the left Siegen Castle.

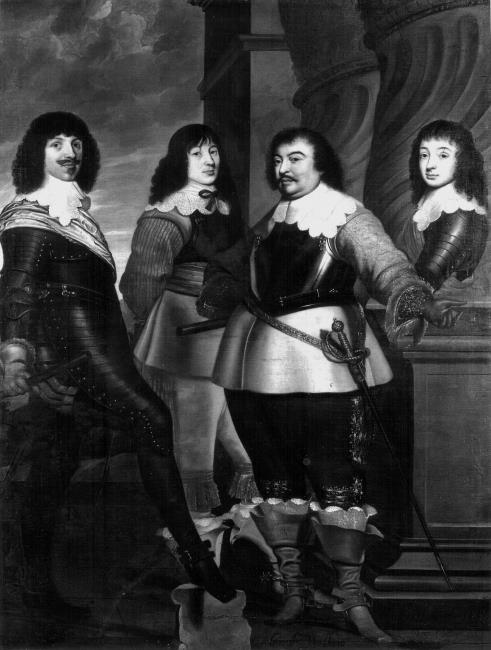
Group portrait of Count William of Nassau-Siegen with his son Maurice Frederick and his halfbrothers William Otto and Christian.

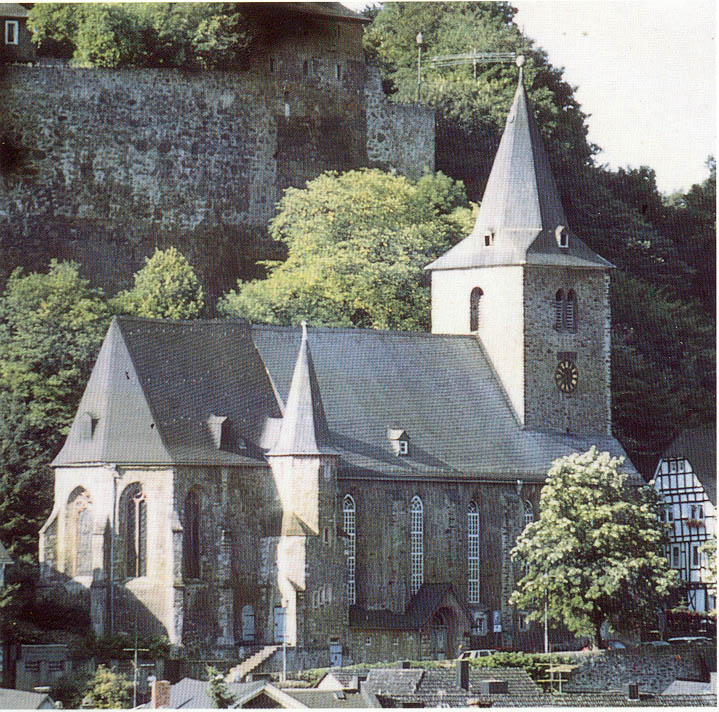
The Evangelische Stadtkirche in Dillenburg, 2014.

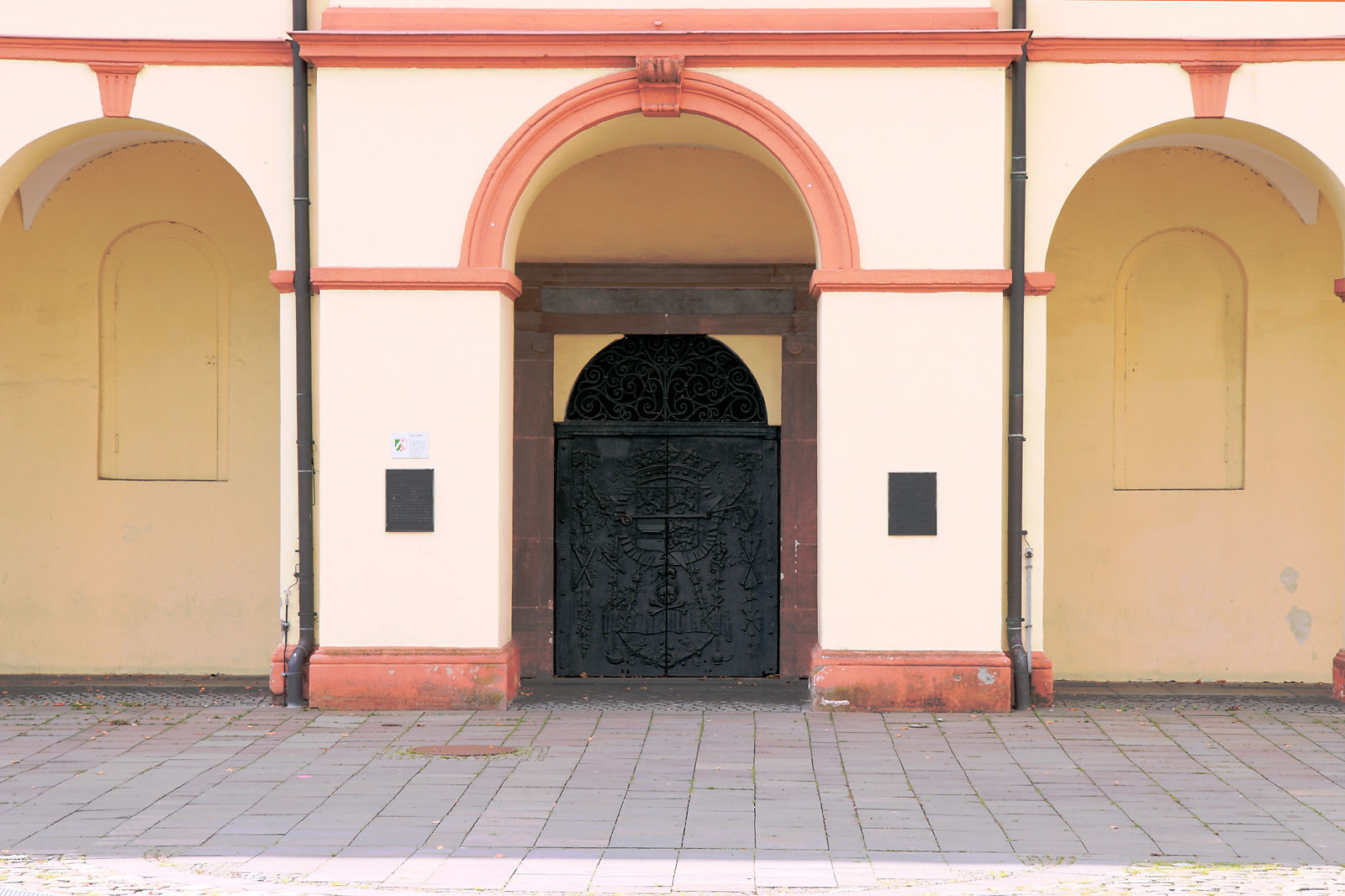
The entrance to the Fürstengruft in Siegen. Photo: Bob Ionescu, 2009.

== Marriage ==
Christian married around 1641 to Anna Barbara von Quadt-Landskron-Rheinbach (from the noble family von Quadt). (Note: The other sources do not mention the marriage. Vorsterman van Oyen (1882), p. 120 mentions that Christian was unmarried.) The marriage remained childless.

== Ancestors ==
Ancestors of Christian of Nassau-Siegen
Great-great-grandparents	John V of Nassau-Siegen (1455–1516) ⚭ 1482; Elisabeth of Hesse-Marburg (1466–1523)	Bodo III 'the Blissful' of Stolberg-Wernigerode (1467–1538) ⚭ 1500; Anna of Eppstein-Königstein (1481–1538)	John IV of Leuchtenberg (1470–1531) ⚭ 1502; Margaret of Schwarzburg-Blankenburg (1482–1518)	Frederick V 'the Elder' of Brandenburg-Ansbach (1460–1536) ⚭ 1479; Sophia of Poland (1464–1512)	Frederick I of Denmark (1471–1533) ⚭ 1502; Anne of Brandenburg (1487–1514)	Magnus I of Saxe-Lauenburg (?–1543) ⚭ 1509; Catherine of Brunswick-Wolfenbüttel (?–1563)	Philip I of Brunswick-Grubenhagen (ca. 1476–1551) ⚭ 1517; Catherine of Mansfeld (1501–1535)	George I of Pomerania (1493–1531) ⚭ 1513; Amalie of the Palatinate (1490–1524)
Great-grandparents	William I 'the Rich' of Nassau-Siegen (1487–1559) ⚭ 1531; Juliane of Stolberg-Wernigerode (1506–1580)		George III of Leuchtenberg (1502–1555) ⚭ 1528; Barbara of Brandenburg-Ansbach (1495–1552)		Christian III of Denmark (1503–1559) ⚭ 1525; Dorothea of Saxe-Lauenburg (1511–1571)		Ernest V of Brunswick-Grubenhagen (1518–1567) ⚭ 1547; Margaret of Pomerania (1518–1569)	
Grandparents	John VI 'the Elder' of Nassau-Siegen (1536–1606) ⚭ 1559; Elisabeth of Leuchtenberg (1537–1579)				John 'the Younger' of Schleswig-Holstein-Sonderburg (1545–1622) ⚭ 1568; Elisabeth of Brunswick-Grubenhagen (1550–1586)			
Parents	John VII 'the Middle' of Nassau-Siegen (1561–1623) ⚭ 1603; Margaret of Schleswig-Holstein-Sonderburg (1583–1658)							

== Sources ==
- Aßmann, Helmut & Menk, Friedhelm (1996). Auf den Spuren von Nassau und Oranien in Siegen (in German). Siegen: Gesellschaft für Stadtmarketing Siegen e.V.
- Behr, Kamill (1854). Genealogie der in Europa regierenden Fürstenhäuser (in German). Leipzig: Verlag von Bernhard Tauchnitz.
- Dek, A.W.E. (1962). Graf Johann der Mittlere von Nassau-Siegen und seine 25 Kinder (in German). Rijswijk: Krips Repro.
- Dek, A.W.E. (1968). "De afstammelingen van Juliana van Stolberg tot aan het jaar van de Vrede van Münster". Spiegel der Historie. Maandblad voor de geschiedenis der Nederlanden (in Dutch). 1968 (7/8): 228–303.
- Dek, A.W.E. (1970). Genealogie van het Vorstenhuis Nassau (in Dutch). Zaltbommel: Europese Bibliotheek.
- von Ehrenkrook, Hans Friedrich; Förster, Karl & Marchtaler, Kurt Erhard (1928). Ahnenreihen aus allen deutschen Gauen. Beilage zum Archiv für Sippenforschung und allen verwandten Gebieten (in German). Görlitz: Verlag für Sippenforschung und Wappenkunde C.A. Starke.
- Huberty, Michel; Giraud, Alain & Magdelaine, F. & B. (1981). l'Allemagne Dynastique (in French). Vol. Tome III: Brunswick-Nassau-Schwarzbourg. Le Perreux: Alain Giraud.
- Huberty, Michel; Giraud, Alain & Magdelaine, F. & B. (1994). l'Allemagne Dynastique (in French). Vol. Tome VII: Oldenbourg-Familles alliées H-L. Le Perreux-sur-Marne: Alain Giraud.
- Lück, Alfred (1981) [1967]. Siegerland und Nederland (in German) (2nd ed.). Siegen: Siegerländer Heimatverein e.V.
- Lück, Alfred & Wunderlich, Hermann (1956) [1952]. Die Fürstengruft zu Siegen (in German). Siegen: Verkehrsverein Siegen e.V.
- Menk, Friedhelm (1967). "Johann der Mittlere, Graf zu Nassau-Siegen (1561–1623) und seine zweite Gemahlin". Siegerland (in German). Band XLIV (Heft 1): 1–28.
- Menk, Friedhelm (1971). Quellen zur Geschichte des Siegerlandes im niederländischen königlichen Hausarchiv (in German). Siegen: Stadt Siegen/Forschungsstelle Siegerland.
- Menk, Friedhelm (1979). "Johann Moritz Fürst zu Nassau-Siegen". Siegerland (in German). Band LVI (Heft 1–2): 1vv.
- Menk, Friedhelm (1994). "Die nassauischen Begräbnisstätten in der ev. Stadtkirche zu Dillenburg". In Pletz-Krehahn, Hans-Jürgen (ed.). 650 Jahre Stadt Dillenburg. Ein Text- und Bildband zum Stadtrechtsjubiläum der Oranierstadt (in German). Dillenburg: Verlag E. Weidenbach GmbH + Co. KG. pp. 119–125.
- Menk, Friedhelm (2004). "Die Fürstengruft zu Siegen und die darin von 1669 bis 1781 erfolgten Beisetzungen". In Burwitz, Ludwig; Menk, Friedhelm; Opfermann, Ulrich Friedrich; Pfau, Dieter & Plaum, Bernd D. (eds.). Siegener Beiträge. Jahrbuch für regionale Geschichte (in German). Vol. 9. Siegen: Geschichtswerkstatt Siegen – Arbeitskreis für Regionalgeschichte e.V. pp. 183–202. ISSN 1431-6684.
- Pletz-Krehahn, Hans-Jürgen (1994). "Beisetzungen in den 15 Grabstellen der Dillenburger Nassauergruft". In Pletz-Krehahn, Hans-Jürgen (ed.). 650 Jahre Stadt Dillenburg. Ein Text- und Bildband zum Stadtrechtsjubiläum der Oranierstadt (in German). Dillenburg: Verlag E. Weidenbach GmbH + Co. KG. pp. 115–118.
- Schutte, O. (1979). "Genealogische gegevens". In Tamse, C.A. (ed.). Nassau en Oranje in de Nederlandse geschiedenis (in Dutch). Alphen aan den Rijn: A.W. Sijthoff. pp. 40–44, 224–228. ISBN 90-218-2447-7.
- Spielmann, Christian (1909). Geschichte von Nassau (Land und Haus) von den ältesten Zeiten bis zur Gegenwart (in German). Vol. Teil 1. Politische Geschichten. Wiesbaden: P. Plauen.
- Textor von Haiger, Johann (1617). Nassauische Chronik (in German). Herborn: Christoph Raab.
- Vorsterman van Oyen, A.A. (1882). Het vorstenhuis Oranje-Nassau. Van de vroegste tijden tot heden (in Dutch). Leiden/Utrecht: A.W. Sijthoff/J.L. Beijers.
