= Margaret of Schleswig-Holstein-Sonderburg =

German duchess (1583–1658)

- Countess Consort of Nassau-Siegen
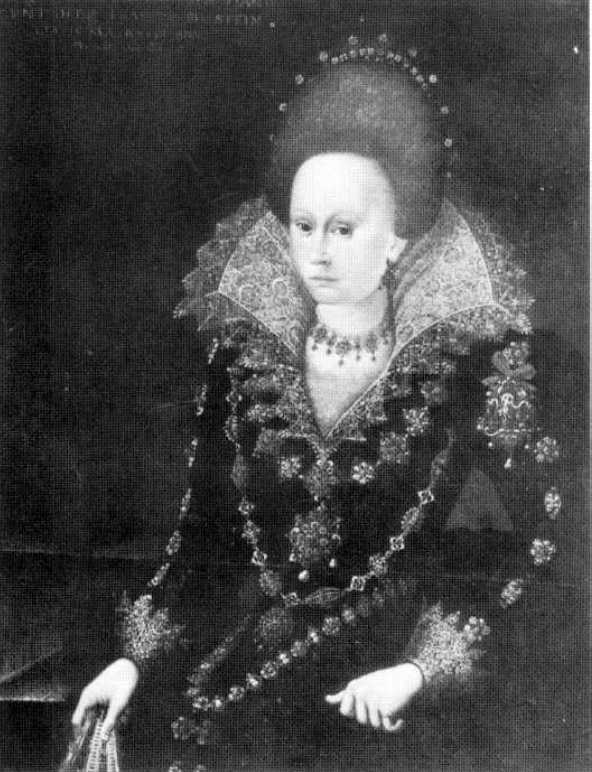
- Countess Margaret of Nassau-Siegen, nee Duchess of Schleswig-Holstein-Sonderburg. Anonymous portrait, 1611. Siegerlandmuseum, Siegen.

- Coat of arms
- Full name: Margaret Duchess of Schleswig-Holstein-Sonderburg
- Native name: Margarethe Herzogin von Schleswig-Holstein-Sonderburg
- Born: Margarethe Erbin zu Norwegen, Herzogin zu Schleswig, Holstein, Stormarn und der Dithmarschen, Gräfin zu Oldenburg und Delmenhorst; 24 February 1583; Haus Sandberg am Alsensund near Sonderburg
- Died: 20 April 1658 (aged 75); Nassauischer Hof, Siegen
- Buried: 28 April 1658; St. Nicholas Church, Siegen; Reburied: 29 April 1690; Fürstengruft, Siegen
- Noble family: House of Schleswig-Holstein-Sonderburg
- Spouse: John VII the Middle of Nassau-Siegen
- Issue Detail: John Maurice; George Frederick; William Otto; Louise Christine; Sophie Margaret; Henry; Mary Juliane; Amalie; Bernhard; Christian; Catharine; John Ernest; Elisabeth Juliane
- Father: John II the Younger of Schleswig-Holstein-Sonderburg
- Mother: Elisabeth of Brunswick-Grubenhagen

Duchess Margaret of Schleswig-Holstein-Sonderburg (24 February 1583 – 10/20 April 1658), German: Margarethe Herzogin von Schleswig-Holstein-Sonderburg, official titles: Erbin zu Norwegen, Herzogin zu Schleswig, Holstein, Stormarn und der Dithmarschen, Gräfin zu Oldenburg und Delmenhorst), was a duchess from the House of Schleswig-Holstein-Sonderburg and through marriage Countess of Nassau-Siegen.

== Biography ==
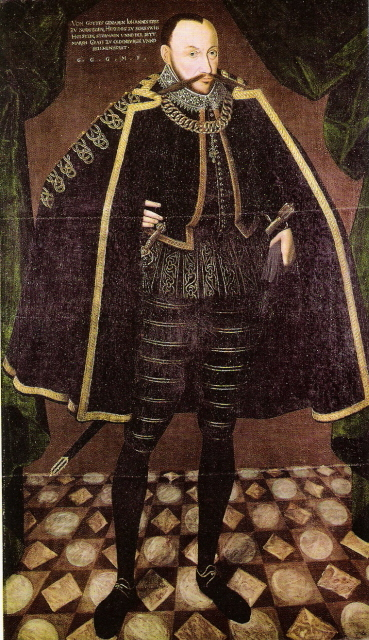
Duke John II the Younger of Schleswig-Holstein-Sonderburg, Margaret's father.

Margaret was born at Haus Sandberg am Alsensund near Sonderburg on 24 February 1583 as the youngest daughter of Duke John II the Younger of Schleswig-Holstein-Sonderburg and his first wife Duchess Elisabeth of Brunswick-Grubenhagen. Margaret's father was a younger brother of King Frederick II of Denmark.

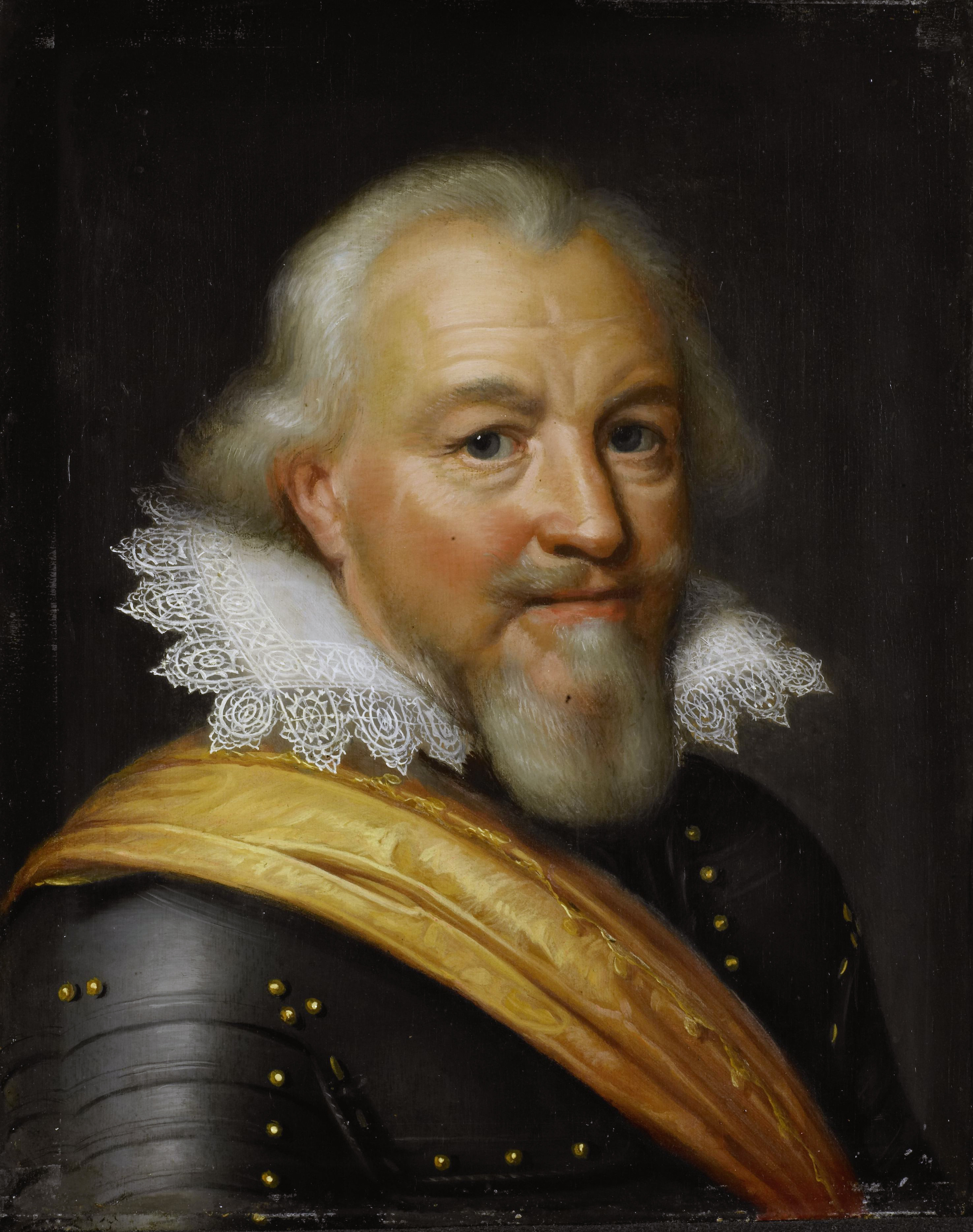
Count John VII the Middle of Nassau-Siegen, Margaret's husband. Studio of Jan Antonisz. van Ravesteyn, c. 1610–1620. Rijksmuseum Amsterdam.

Margaret married at Rotenburg Castle (Note: Glawischnig (1974) states married in Rotenburg/Fulda. Textor von Haiger (1617), p. 153 states married in Rotenburg in Hessen and specifies that this was the Beilager and that the Heimführung took place on 3 September 1603 in Dillenburg.) on 27 August 1603 (Note: All but one of the sources that mention a full marriage date, state this date. Only Glawischnig (1974) states the date 6 September 1603. It is not clear whether the author intended to convert the date mentioned by the other sources to the Gregorian calendar, or whether the date mentioned by the other sources is according to the Julian calendar.) to Count John VII the Middle of Nassau-Siegen (Siegen Castle, (Note: Glawischnig (1974) states that he was born in Siegen. All older sources that mention a place of birth, state that he was born in Dillenburg.) 7 June 1561 – Siegen Castle, (Note: The other sources that mention a place of death, state that he died in Siegen.) 27 September 1623 (Note: All but one of the sources that mention a complete date of death, state this date. Only Glawischnig (1974) states the date 7 October 1623. It is not clear whether the author meant to convert the date mentioned by the other sources to the Gregorian calendar, nor whether the date mentioned by the other sources is according to the Julian calendar.)), the second son of Count John VI the Elder of Nassau-Siegen and his first wife Landgravine Elisabeth of Leuchtenberg. John the Middle was the widower of Countess Magdalene of Waldeck-Wildungen (1558 – Idstein Castle, (Note: The other sources do not mention a place of death.) 9 September 1599).

Margaret met John after he had served as commander-in-chief of the Swedish army in Livonia. Although he already had a son a year older than Margaret, they married.

When his father died on 8 October 1606, John succeeded his father together with his brothers William Louis, George, Ernest Casimir and John Louis. On 30 March 1607 the brothers divided their possessions. John acquired Siegen, Freudenberg, Netphen, Hilchenbach, Ferndorf and the Haingericht. (Note: "The Haingericht was certainly located around the castle of Hainchen, which passed with its dependencies to the House of Nassau in 1313. See Historische Stätten Deutschlands III, 245.") Since the partition, John has had his Residenz in Siegen Castle, which he had renovated around that time.

John's idea to give the Protestant cause good leaders for a people's army, was the reason for the Kriegsschule, founded in Siegen in 1616, probably the world's first military academy. Prince John asked for financial support, but did not give him a penny. But despite the fact that he was so indebted by supporting the Dutch Revolt, that for some time he considered giving up his residence in Siegen and going to live with his brother William Louis, he nevertheless founded the school. At that time Margaret wrote a letter to King Christian IV of Denmark, asking for the payment of an old debt. Possibly Danish money served to open the Kriegsschule. However, the Thirty Years' War broke out so early that the Kriegsschule in Siegen could not be effective and soon ceased to exist.

When John received the County of Nassau-Siegen in 1607, he decided that such a small country (it had about 9,000 inhabitants and yielded an annual revenue of about 13,000 guilders) should not be divided up again. To avoid this, he made a will and testament, which stated that only the eldest son would rule and the other children should be compensated with money or offices. As one of the most convinced advocates of Protestantism, it was particularly painful for John that his second son, John the Younger, converted to the Catholic Church in 1613. In a codicil of 8 October 1613 John the Middle explicitly stipulated that his heirs had to keep the land in the Reformed confession. At first, the conversion of John the Younger to Catholicism did not change this house law established by the will, because he was not the eldest son. That was John John Ernest.

To the great surprise of his relatives, John the Younger joined the Spaniards in 1617 and thus joined the opponents of the House of Nassau and the Dutch Republic. In the same year, his older brother John Ernest died in the service of the Republic of Venice. The transition of John the Younger to the political enemy hit his father as hard as the conversion to Catholicism had hit him. This new situation forced John the Middle to ask himself whether an enemy of Nassau and the Netherlands could remain his heir at all. On 15 November 1617, John the Middle declared his will of 8 April 1607 to be null and void. Abolition of the primogeniture would have meant a division of the small country, and therefore John the Middle opposed all proposals in that direction. Instead, in an amicable agreement, he had his son sign a declaration on 31 December 1617, in which the latter declared that, although he himself was and remained a Catholic, he would not force his subjects to any other than the existing religious confession. All his brothers advised John the Middle to change the primogeniture, but he firmly trusted the word, the letter and the seal of his son. On 22 December 1618 John the Middle drew up a second will, which had the above-mentioned promises of his son as a condition and still held on to the primogeniture. However, he imposed the penalty of disinheritance on the introduction of 'papism'.

Only once John the Middle was convinced that his son was under the influence of the Jesuits and that the possibility of a Catholic area within the Nassau lands was a danger to the Protestant inhabitants, did he get persuaded to make a new will. On 3 July 1621 he drew up a third will, in which he laid down something that he had always considered to be utterly nonsensical, namely to divide the small county of Nassau-Siegen, which was barely able to support one lord, into three parts. His three eldest sons, John the Younger, William (both sons of John's first marriage) and John Maurice (the eldest son of Margaret), were to receive one third each. The administration of the city of Siegen would remain in joint ownership of the three sons.

For John the Younger, therefore, only one third of the county was provided for in the third will. On 6 August 1621, he was informed of this, with a precise statement of the reasons that had led his father to take this step. On 9 May 1623, i.e. not until two years later, John the Younger protested against this with a letter from Frankfurt to the councillors of Siegen. Of course, in the meantime he had not been idle and had not hesitated to denounce his father to the Emperor. At the time of his letter of protest he was certainly already aware of the Poenale mandatum cassatorium, which Emperor Ferdinand II officially issued some time later, on 27 June 1623, informing John the Middle that at the time of making his third will as a fellow combatant of the outlawed Winter King he was not entitled to make a will. He had to revoke it and answer to an imperial court within two months. It seems that John the Younger then shrank from having the imperial decree delivered to his seriously ill father.

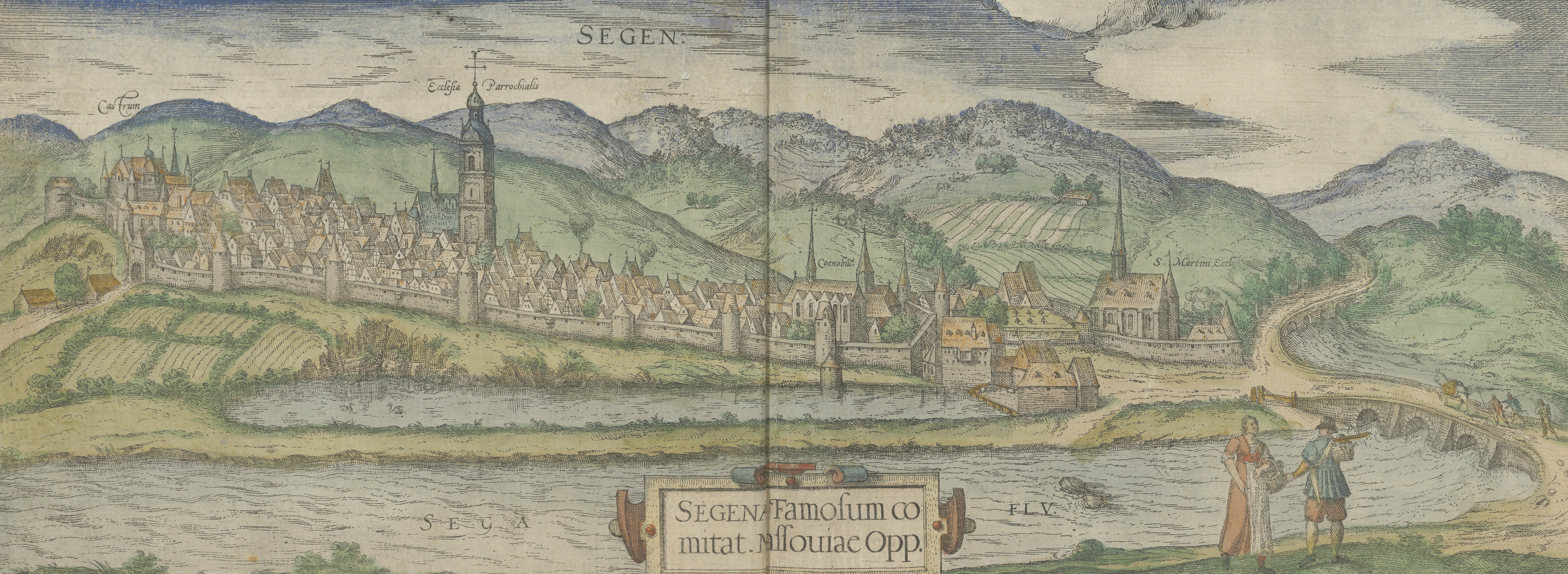
Siegen in 1617. From Braun & Hogenberg, Civitates orbis terrarum Band 6, Cologne, 1617. On the left the city castle. Left from the center the St. Nicholas Church. In the middle (under the word Coenobiu) the St. John's Church of the former Franciscan monastery, which buildings were named Nassauischer Hof and were Margaret's dower.

John died a shortly afterwards, aged 62. None of the three sons mentioned in the will were present at the death of their father. On 13 October William and John Maurice arrived in Siegen, and on 26 October John the Younger. Their father was buried on 5/15 November 1623 in the St. Nicholas Church in Siegen. There he had planned a dignified burial vault for the dynasty he founded, in the St. Nicholas Church in Siegen. For this, there are remarkable notes in Latin, partly in elegiac couplets, for a projected memorial and burial place of the sovereign family, from the time around 1620, with the names of all 25 children from his two marriages, also with details of birth, marriage and death of his relatives. Since the project was not carried out, the burials of the members of the sovereign family between 1607 and 1658 took place in the inadequate burial vault under the choir of the mentioned parish church.

Everyone knew that there would be a dispute at the reading of the will on 11 December 1623. John the Younger had the imperial decree read out, and when his brothers were not very impressed by it, he said as he stood up: "Der Kaiser wird uns scheiden!" ("The Emperor will part us!"). He had taken the precaution of obtaining a further imperial decree on 20 November 1623 against Margaret (now the Countess Dowager) and her sons, in which the Emperor strictly forbade impeding John's assumption of government, his taking possession of the land and his inauguration. On 12 January 1624, John the Younger was able to accept the homage from the city of Siegen, but only because he beforehand had secretly let a squadron of selected horsemen into the town through the castle gate (that is, not through a city gate) in a heavy snowstorm, so that they could not be seen or heard by the town guards.

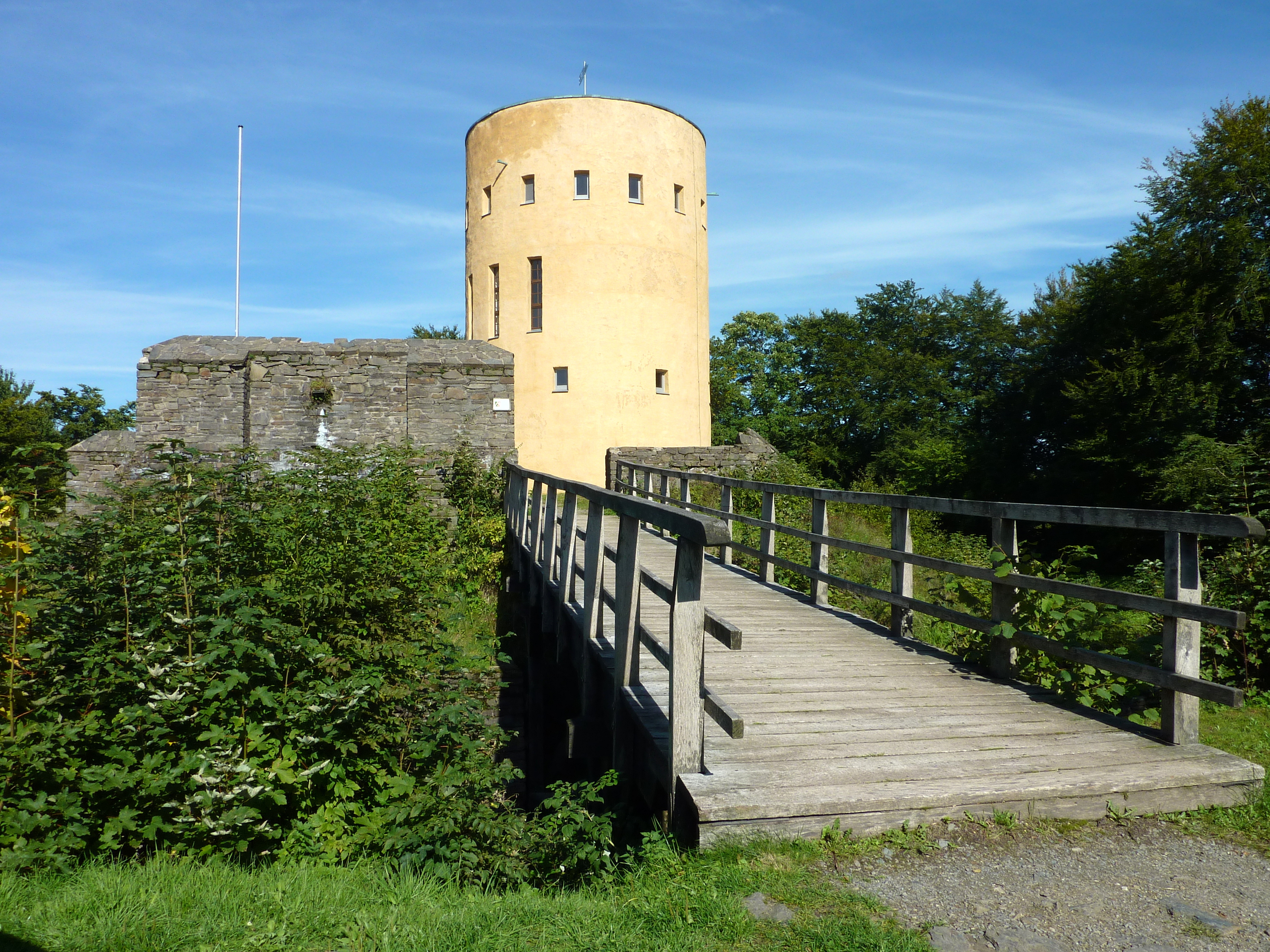
Ginsburg Castle. Photo: Frank Behnsen, 2010.

John the Younger thus received the entire inheritance, and the provisions of the will made in favour of William and John Maurice remained a dead letter. However, on 13/23 January 1624, John the Younger voluntarily ceded the sovereignty over the Hilchenbach district with Ginsburg Castle and some villages belonging to the Ferndorf and Netphen districts, to William. With the exception of John Maurice and George Frederick, the younger brothers accepted only modest appanages. Henceforth, until 1645, the county of Nassau-Siegen had two governments, one in Siegen, the other in Hilchenbach. However, for a short period (1632–1635) this situation underwent a temporary change: during the Thirty Years' War, his brothers, who were fighting on the Protestant side, rebelled against John the Younger.

Count Louis Henry of Nassau-Dillenburg entered the service of King Gustavus II Adolphus of Sweden on 1 December 1631, who had landed in Germany on 24 June 1630 to intervene in favour of the Protestants in the Thirty Years' War. Countess Dowager Margaret, through the mediation of Louis Henry, turned to Gustavus Adolphus and asked for help against the machinations of her stepson John the Younger. Consequently, on 14 February 1632 the Swedish king sent an order from Frankfurt to Louis Henry to provide military support for his first cousin John Maurice. Louis Henry then occupied the city of Siegen with his regiment of Dutch and Swedish soldiers. One day later, on 29 February, John Maurice and his brother Henry arrived in Siegen. Just as John the Younger had kept his cavalry in reserve eight years earlier, now John Maurice and Henry, supported by the presence of the Swedish regiment, negotiated with the citizens, who felt bound by the oath they had sworn to John the Younger. On 4 March, after long and difficult negotiations, the citizens paid homage to John Maurice and Henry. John Maurice obtained for himself not only the Freudenberg district, which his father had intended for him in the will of 1621, but also Netphen, which had been intended for John the Younger in the same will. William was not only confirmed in the possession of Hilchenbach, but also received Ferndorf and Krombach, as stipulated in his father's will. The city of Siegen paid homage only to William and John Maurice, who only in 1635 admitted their elder brother John the Younger back into co-sovereignty. However, the latter soon restored the old order: in 1636, he again became the sole owner of his father's property, with the exception of Hilchenbach, which he left to William, and he again governed the city of Siegen alone. John Maurice was again excluded from the county's sovereignty. However, in 1642 he inherited the territory from his brother William in accordance with his father's will.

John the Younger died in Ronse on 27 July 1638. His only son John Francis Desideratus was born in Nozeroy on 28 July 1627. His mother acted as regent until his marriage in 1651. He made several attempts to obtain the whole Siegerland. In 1646 he visited the Emperor in Vienna to protest against his uncle John Maurice's seizure of the county. On 22 January 1645, after his return from Brazil, the latter, with his brothers George Frederick and Henry and an 80-man entourage, had forcibly occupied Siegen Castle and on 15 February had received the renewed homage from the citizens, albeit this time only for two-thirds of the county. To end the constant dispute, John Maurice wanted to adhere strictly to his father's will of 1621 and leave his nephew John Francis Desideratus the one third that was due to him. Already before his departure to Brazil, on 25 October 1635, he had explicitly authorised his subjects to recognise the then still living John the Younger as co-ruler. In 1645 John Maurice relinquished his rights to the Freudenberg district, granted by the will of 1621, in favour of his brother George Frederick. John Francis Desideratus was unsuccessful with the Emperor in Vienna, and two years later, at the Congress of Westphalia, Emperor Ferdinand III ratified the fiercely contested 1621 will of John the Middle. This left John Francis Desideratus only the Catholic third part, which is still known today as Johannland. John Maurice held both the other thirds in his hand, because his brother William had already died and left him his third part, and George Frederick had ceded all his rights to John Maurice in 1649. It was therefore the latter who continued to administer the Freudenberg district.

Margaret died at the Nassauischer Hof in Siegen on 10/20 April 1658 (Note: The other sources that mention the place and date of death, state that she died in Siegen on 10 April 1658.) She was buried under the choir of the St. Nicholas Church in Siegen on 18/28 April. On 29 April 1690 (Note: Lück & Wunderlich (1956), p. 27 however, state the date 26 April 1690.) Margaret and John the Middle were reburied in the Fürstengruft in Siegen.

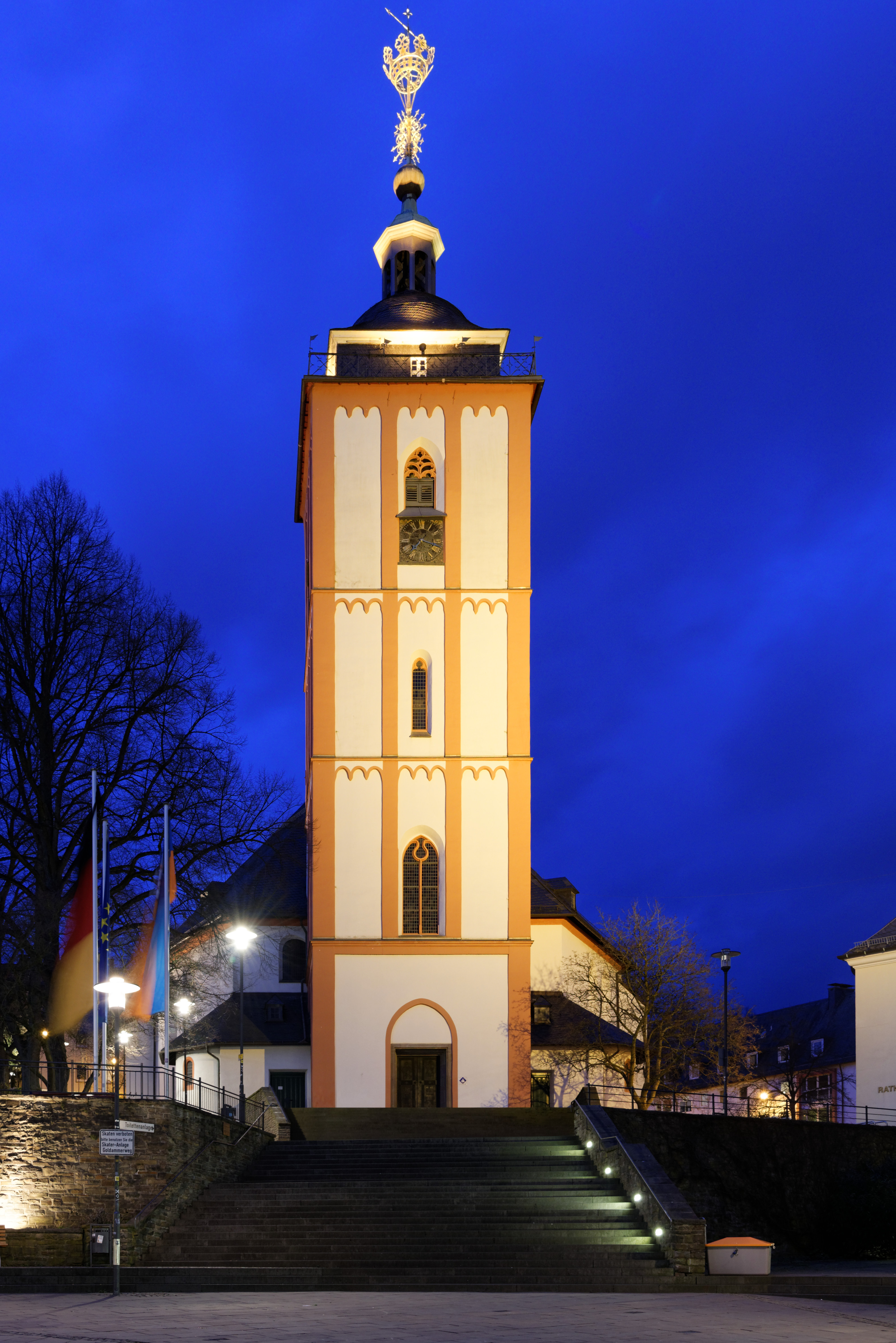
The St. Nicholas Church in Siegen. Photo: Matthias Böhm, 2016.

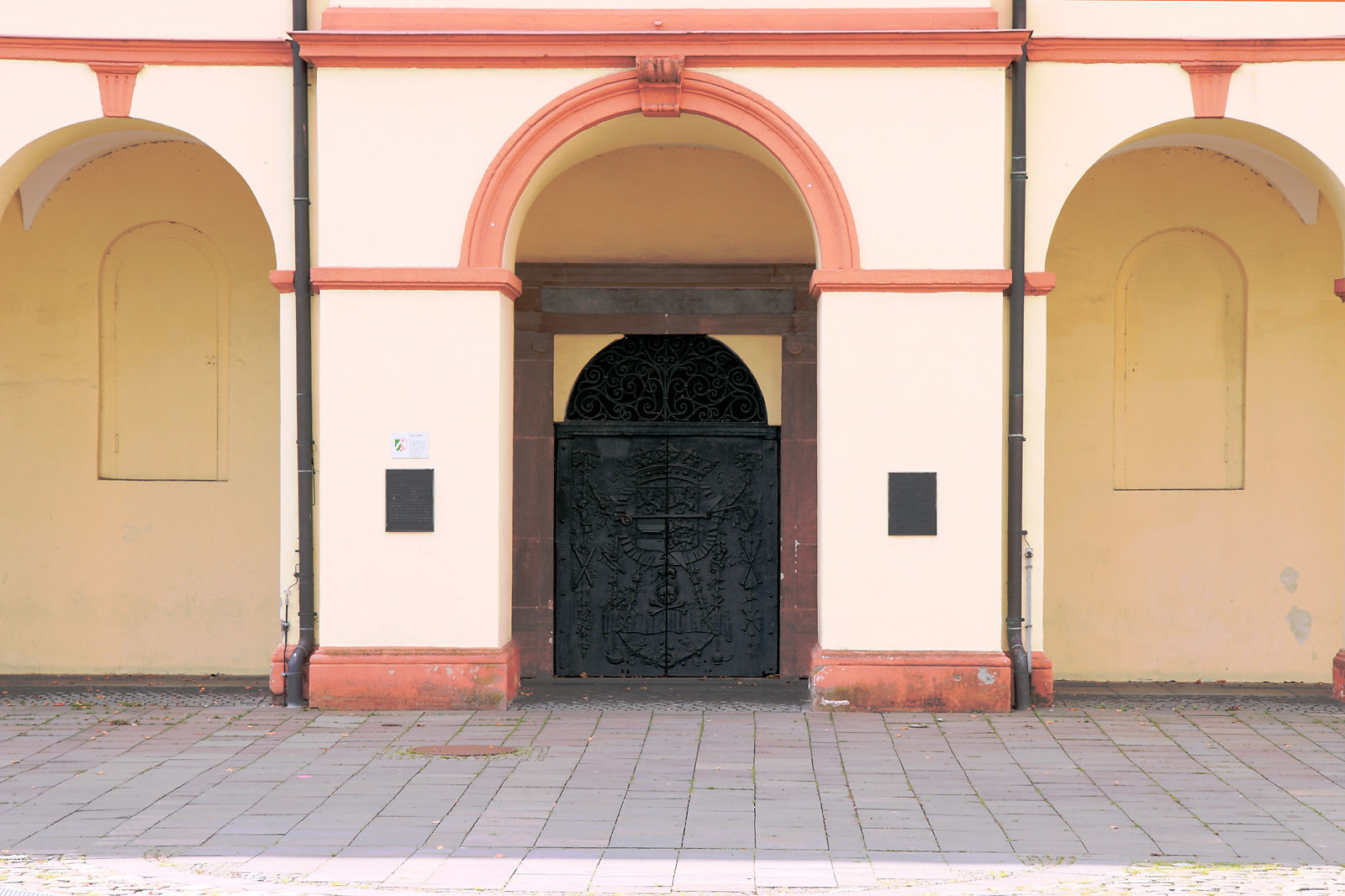
The entrance to the Fürstengruft in Siegen. Photo: Bob Ionescu, 2009.

== Issue ==
From the marriage of Margaret and John the Middle the following children were born:

1. Fürst John Maurice (Dillenburg Castle, 18 June 1604 (Note: "All authors indicate 17-6-1604 as the date of birth of John Maurice (including Dek (1962), where the place is indicated). Personally, we agree with the conclusions of the recent study published in Menk (1979), in which the author practically proves that the real date is 18 June. The 17th is only mentioned by the chronicler Textor von Haiger, who wrote in 1617: «Johann Moritz ist geboren den 17 Junii, zwischen 9 und 10 uhren des nachts im Jahr 1604, auf dem Schloß Dillenburg». Another unknown chronicler, whose work from after 1652 has been preserved in the Royal House Archive of the Netherlands (4 Nr. 1486a), repeats the same information, while a more recent biographer, Driesen, states that in at least one case the prince himself declared that he was born on the 17th. However, this is not conclusive proof, as there are many examples of royal persons from the 17th and 18th centuries who did not know the exact date of their birth. It should also be noted that, according to Menk (1979), a secretary of the prince had started a new biography of his master. However, the manuscript leaves the date of birth blank, which proves that there must have been some uncertainty about it. An unknown hand has added in the margin that the prince was born on … 14 June! This is difficult to imagine, because although no birth notification for John Maurice has been found (his baptismal certificate does not appear in the registers in Dillenburg, which started in 1572), we know from a congratulatory letter preserved in the State Archives Wiesbaden (170^{III}) that the notifications were sent on the 19th. Furthermore, Menk (1979) quotes two letters that are original documents, which are difficult to refute: 1) a letter from the prince's sister Elisabeth, sent on 8 July, mentioning the birth on 18 June; 2) a letter from the maternal grandmother of the young prince, who replied from Sonderburg on 16-7-1604 that she had been delighted to hear of the birth of her grandson «verschienen 18 Junii abents umb 10 Uhr». This is a reaction to the official announcement of the birth. Finally, the author formulates two more judicious considerations that help make his thesis more credible. First, it was customary for ancient chroniclers to emphasise that a birth took place on a Sunday. Textor von Haiger does not fail to point this out for the brothers of John Maurice (John Ernest, John the Younger and George Frederick). However, he says nothing about John Maurice, although 17 June 1604 (according to the old calendar, which only could be mentioned here) also was on a Sunday, which is another reason to think that he made a mistake. Furthermore, the accounts of the treasury of the child's grandfather, who also resided at Dillenburg Castle, show that on 19 June the pleased grandfather granted the sum of 1 ducat, 2 guilders and 9 albus to the midwife who came to inform him of the successful delivery of his daughter-in-law. How could anyone wait more than a day to wander through the corridors of the castle to inform the grandfather of the birth of his grandson? So it seemed wise to think outside the box once more and follow Menk (1979) in his conclusions.") – Berg und Tal near Cleves, 10/20 December 1679 (Note: "This is a place that is now part of the town of Kleve and where the prince had a modest residence that he called his «Hüttchen» (see Lück & Wunderlich (1956)). Dek (1962) speaks of the «kasteel» of Kleve. See Royal House Archive of the Netherlands (IV/1491), «Protokoll wegen Uberführung der Leiche … von Kleve nach Siegen», Siegen 2/12‑2‑1680. See also State Archives Wiesbaden (170^{III}), notification dated Siegen 13/23‑12‑1679: «am nechtsverwichenen Mittwochen den 10/20 dieses, morgens umb 9 Uhren».")), was among others governor-captain-admiral-general of Dutch Brazil 1636–1644, stadtholder of Cleves, Mark, Ravensberg and Minden since 1647, Grand Master of the Order of Saint John since 1652 and First Field Marshal of the Dutch States Army 1668–1674. Became count in two-thirds of the County of Nassau-Siegen in 1645 and was elevated to Reichsfürst in 1652.
2. George Frederick Louis (Dillenburg Castle, 23 February 1606 – Bergen op Zoom, 2 October 1674 (Note: "Europäische Stammtafeln wrongly states that he died in June 1674. For his death, see: a. official death notification in Bergen op Zoom on 2-10-1674 in State Archives Wiesbaden (130^{II}, 2200); b. official notification dated Bergen op Zoom 2‑10‑1674 in State Archives Wiesbaden (130^{II}, 2380^{III} c): «Ableben … diessen Morgen zwischen 3 u. 4 Uhren»; c. death register of the city of Bergen op Zoom for the year 1674: «1674 october 2. den governeur Graef Frits».")), was among others commander of Rheinberg and governor of Bergen op Zoom. In 1664 he was elevated to the rank and title of prince. Married in The Hague (Note: Huberty, et al. (1981), p. 234 and Dek (1968), p. 249 do not mention the place of marriage. Dek (1968), p. 245 puts the place of marriage between brackets with a question mark. The marriage is mentioned in the marriage register of the Kloosterkerk in The Hague, see: Frederick of Nassau-Siegen and Eleonora Mauritia of Portugal (church marriage).jpg.) on 4 June 1647 to Mauritia Eleonora of Portugal (Note: The given name Mauritia Eleonora in Menk (2004), p. 192, Huberty, et al. (1981), pp. 234–235, Dek (1970), p. 89, Dek (1968), p. 249, Blok (1911), p. 926 and Vorsterman van Oyen (1882), p. 119. The given name Eleonora Mauritia in Van Ditzhuyzen (2004), p. 87 and Dek (1968), p. 245. The given name Mauritia in Lück (1981), p. 100 and Poelhekke (1979), p. 547. The full name Eleonora Mauritia of Crato instead of Princess of Portugal, with the byname Mauke in Kooijmans (2000), p. 66.) (baptised Delft, 10 May 1609 – Bergen op Zoom, 15 June 1674 (Note: "Europäische Stammtafeln situates her death in 1679. Dek (1962) does not know the place of death, but Dek (1970) says «gest. Bergen op Zoom 16 juni 1674» (in contrast to 25 June in Dek (1962)). See for this death: a. the death registers of the city of Bergen op Zoom: «1674. Junius 16 de heer Governeur vrau». This is probably the date of the funeral, because: b. notification sent by the husband from Bergen op Zoom 15 June 1674 in State Archives Wiesbaden (130^{II}, 2201): «Eleonora Mauritia, Fürstin zu Nassau-Siegen, geb. Prinzessin von Portugal, heute, zwischen 3 u. 4 Uhren nachmittags»; c. two other death announcements, identical to the previous one, in State Archives Wiesbaden (130^{II}, 2380^{III} e).")).
3. William Otto (Dillenburg Castle, 23 June 1607 – near Wolfenbüttel, 14 August 1641 (Note: "See Dek (1962); State Archives Wiesbaden (170^{III}): notification addressed to Count Christian from the army camp at Wolfenbüttel 15‑8‑1641: «gestrigen Tages uff einer partey einen tödlichen Schuss bekommen, und hernach alsobalden diese Welt gesegnet».")), was an officer in the Swedish army.
4. Louise Christine (Siegen Castle, 8 October 1608 – Château-Vilain near Sirod (Jura), 29 December 1678^{Greg.} (Note: "See the death register of the parish of Sirod (Jura), which included Château-Vilain, the residence of the de Watteville family: «1685 Nobilis L.C. de Nassau, Marchionissa de Conflan, Annorum octoginta et amplius animam deo reddidit die vigesima nona decembris, cuius corpus in templo sepultum est». We are almost certain that the death took place in Château-Vilain.")), married in Nozeroy on 4 July 1627 to Philippe François de Joux dit de Watteville (c. 1605 – Bletterans, 1636), Marquis de Conflans, Comte de Bussolin.
5. Sophie Margaret (Siegen Castle, 16 April 1610 – Wisch Castle, Terborg, 8/18 May 1665 (Note: "Mary Magdalene, Countess of Nassau-Siegen, announced the death of Sophie Margaret. The letter is dated Haus Wisch, zu Terborg 11/21‑5‑1665: «morte le 8 de ce mois, entre 10 et 11 heures du soir». The death date 28-5, given by Europäische Stammtafeln, is therefore incorrect. Another notification is also sent from Cleves on 20 May 1665: «den 18 um 11 Uhr mitternachts zu der Borg (Terborg)». See State Archives Wiesbaden (170^{III}).")), married at Wisch Castle in Terborg on 13 January 1656 (Note: "The date 1636 mentioned by Europäische Stammtafeln I, 117 and IV, 39 is impossible: the first wife of the Count of Limburg-Stirum did not die until 1649, according to Geschiedenis der Graven van Limburg-Stirum volume III, 1, 9. According to the same work, the marriage took place in Terborg on 13-1-1656. See the marriage register of the reformed parish of Terborg (municipal archives Wisch), p. 16b, year 1656: «proclamert 6 Januar, kopuliert 13 Januar».") to George Ernest of Limburg-Stirum (Botmurde, 29 August 1593 – September 1661), Count of Bronckhorst, Lord of Wisch, Lichtenvoorde and Wildenborch.
6. Henry (Siegen Castle, 9 August 1611 (Note: "From Siegen, on 9-8-1611, John the Middle announced the birth of a son «heute zwischen vier und fünf Uhren vormittags». See State Archives Marburg (115, Waldeck 2, Nassau 337). See also a letter from John the Middle dated Siegen 16‑8‑1611: «den 9. dieses» (State Archives Wiesbaden 170^{III}, Korrespondenzen) and, under the same number: «Ordnung für den Ablaufder Kindtaufe auf dem Schloss (zu Siegen) Heinrich Gf. zu Nassau» (born in Siegen 9‑8‑1611, baptised Siegen, 29 Sept. 1611), Siegen, 29‑9‑1611.") – Hulst, 27 October/7 November 1652 (Note: "The genealogists usually say that he died on 27-10-1652. However, there is a notification in the State Archives Marburg (115, Waldeck 2, Nassau 339) dated 7 November 1652. From Hulst, Mary Magdalene, Countess of Nassau-Siegen, reports the death of her husband, which took place «heute morgen umb 4 Uhren».")), was among others colonel in the Dutch States Army, governor of Hulst and envoy on behalf of the States-General of the Netherlands. Married at Wisch Castle in Terborg on 19/29 April 1646 (Note: "On 9‑3‑1646 in Europäische Stammtafeln I, 117 en IV, 39. On 19‑4‑1646 in Geschiedenis der Graven van Limburg Stirum volume III, 1, 9 with indication of the place «Terborg». On 29‑4‑1646 in the Genealogisches Handbuch des Adels XXXIII, 51. 9‑3‑1646 is the date of the signing of the marriage contract (see Menk (1967), p. 2). Although a notification was sent to the princes of Holstein inviting them to the ceremony on 15/25 April, must be admitted that it was postponed to 19/29 April (see the marriage registers of Terborg, and Menk (1967), p. 2). The archives of the princes of Wittgenstein in Laasphe (F., 320^{III}) also contain a draft of a congratulatory letter to Count Henry of Nassau-Siegen on the occasion of his marriage on 19/29 April, announced on 16/26 March.") to Countess Mary Magdalene of Limburg-Stirum (Note: "Europäische Stammtafeln calls her Maria Elisabeth. On the other hand, we found Maria Magdalena in the Geschiedenis van de Graven van Limburg-Stirum volume III, 1, 9, which is confirmed by the death notification: «Maria Magdalena».") (1632 (Note: "Geschiedenis der Graven van Limburg Stirum sets the birth around 1632.") – Nassauischer Hof, Siegen, 27 December 1707 (Note: "See the parish registers of Siegen. Burial on the 29th in the royal crypt. A notification dated Siegen 27 December 1707 (State Archives Wiesbaden 130^{II}, 2380^{III} c) states that she died «heute Nachmittag zwischen 1 u. 2 Uhren». An identical notification is kept in the State Archives Marburg (4f. Nassau-Siegen, Nr. 241).")).
7. Mary Juliane (Siegen Castle, 14 August 1612 (Note: "See Dek (1962). In the Royal House Archive of the Netherlands (4/1318^{a}) we find an account of the life of John the Middle, in which it is said that Mary Juliane was born on 14 August 1612, between eleven o'clock and midnight, but without mentioning the place.") – Neuhaus an der Elbe, 21 January 1665^{Jul.} (Note: "See State Archives Dresden, Geheimes Archiv Kursachsen, 69 Lauenburgische Sachen: notification concerning Neuhaus a.d. Elbe, 1655, 22.1/1.2: «am 21. dieses morgens um 9 Uhr». It is therefore certain that the princess died in this city, where she was buried in the crypt of the church. In any case, the date of death by Europäische Stammtafeln (16-1-1655), appears to be incorrect.")), married in Treptow on 13 December 1637 (Note: "See notification (in Royal House Archive of the Netherlands 4/1350): Lübeck, 17 July 1638: «zu Treptow … in ein christliches Ehegelöbnis eingelassen und also den 13 Dezember 1637 unser Beylager … vollzogen».") to Duke Francis Henry of Saxe-Lauenburg (9 April 1604 – 26 November 1658).
8. Amalie (Siegen Castle, 2 September 1613 (Note: "According to Hæutle (1870), the grave inscription says that she was born on 12-9-1615 in Siegen, while Dek (1962) mentions Siegen, 2-9-1613 (as does Europäische Stammtafeln). It seems that this last date must be adhered to, although the indications we have about this birth differ. The paternal grandmother, widow of John the Elder, writes: «vor einer halben Stunde diese Nacht zwischen 12 u. 1 Uhr», and, no doubt because she writes at about 1 a.m., she dates her letter to 1 September (see State Archives Wiesbaden 170^{III}). The father dates his letter to 2 September 1613 (Siegen), but he places the time of delivery differently: «diese Nacht zwischen 11 und 12 Uhren», which would mean that the birth took place on the first at night (State Archives Wiesbaden 170^{III}). However, in the Lebensbeschreibung of John the Middle (Royal House Archive of the Netherlands (4/1318^{a}), is the official date of birth, given for Amalia, 2 September 1613, at night, between one and two o'clock. This is the date we have chosen.") – Sulzbach, 24 August 1669^{Greg.} (Note: "See Rigsarkivet Kobenhaven, Tyske, Kancelli II, Pfalz Sulzbach A I. 15 August 1669, Sulzbach, death notification: «gestern als den 14ten dieses, abends zwischen 6 u. 7 Uhren». Hæutle (1870) says: died in Sulzbach on 24-8-1669, mentioning that this is the new style, and he quotes the epitaph on the tomb.")), married:
  1. in Alt-Stettin on 23 April 1636 (Note: "Europäische Stammtafeln mentions 20‑4‑1636. Dek (1962), based on the marriage contract, dates the marriage in Stettin on 28-4-1636. Elgenstierna (1936): 18‑4‑1636. However, we have chosen the date 23-4 because of a notification that the groom himself sent to his mother-in-law, the widow of John the Middle: from Stralsund he reports on 7 July 1636 the marriage «jüngsthin den 23 Aprilis … zur christlichen copulation auff der Fürstl. Residentz zu A(lten) Stettin». See also Menk (1971), p. 27.") to Herman Wrangel af Salmis (Note: "Hæutle (1870) calls him Count von Wrangel. This is a mistake. See Taschenbuch der uradeligen Häuser (1924), pp. 812–813. It was his son who became count in Sweden in 1651. In the notification of her husband's death, Amalie calls herself «veuve d'Hermann Wrangel af Salmis».") (in Livonia, 29 June 1587 – Riga, 11 December 1643);
  2. in Stockholm on 27 March 1649 (Note: "Married in Stockholm, 3‑4‑1649, in Hæutle (1870) and Dek (1962); on 4‑4‑1649, according to Elgenstierna (1936). But Behr (1854), p. 194, says that according to the notification the marriage took place on 27-3-1649. Europäische Stammtafeln gives this date in his first volume, both in table 35 (Pfalzgrafen von Sulzbach) and in table 117 (Nassau-Siegen).") to Count Palatine Christian Augustus of Sulzbach (Sulzbach, 26 July 1622 – Sulzbach, 23 April 1708).
9. Bernhard (Siegen Castle, 18 November 1614 – Siegen Castle, 6 January 1617^{Jul.} (Note: "Dek (1970) says that he died on 13-1-1617 in Siegen (see also Europäische Stammtafeln). But the official death notification (State Archives Wiesbaden 170^{III}) is dated Siegen 6‑1‑1617 and says deceased «diesen Morgen, Montags, zwischen 6 u. 7 Uhr», which also confirms that it is the old style.")).
10. Christian (Siegen Castle, 16 July 1616 – near Düren, 1/11 April 1644 (Note: "Dek (1962) says he was killed in action in the battle at Neuss on 11‑4‑1644. But we find, in the Royal House Archive of the Netherlands (4/1499^{d}), a letter from the mother who from Siegen reported the death of her son. The name of the town of Neuss has been crossed out and replaced with that of Düren: «bei der Stadt Deuren in einem Treffen eine Meile wegs jenseits von Düren». Further on she clarifies «between Cologne and Düren on the Steinstrasse». The date of death is mentioned as 1/11‑4‑1644.")), was a colonel in the Imperial Army. Married c. 1641 to Anna Barbara von Quadt-Landskron-Rheinbach.
11. Catharine (Siegen Castle, 1 August 1617 – Nassauischer Hof, Siegen, 31 August 1645).
12. John Ernest (Siegen Castle, 8 November 1618^{Jul.} (Note: "See various birth notifications preserved in the State Archives Wiesbaden (170^{III}): «den achten dieses v.s. vormittags, zwischen 8 u. 9 Uhr», and another in the National Archives of the Netherlands in The Hague, Inv. ns. Staten-Generaal 6049, drawn up in the same terms.") – São Salvador da Bahia de Todos os Santos, Brazil, 23 November 1639), was a naval officer on board the 'Alkmaar'.
13. Elisabeth Juliane (Siegen Castle, 1 May 1620^{Jul.} (Note: "See State Archives Wiesbaden (170^{III}). From Siegen, on 1-5-1620, the birth is announced «heute Montag (thus old style) den 1. May des Morgens umb 3 Uhren».") – Wesel, 13 May 1665), married in the Nassauischer Hof in Siegen on 9/19 August 1647 to Count Bernhard of Sayn-Wittgenstein-Berleburg-Neumagen (30 November 1620 – Aldenghoor Castle, 13 December 1675).
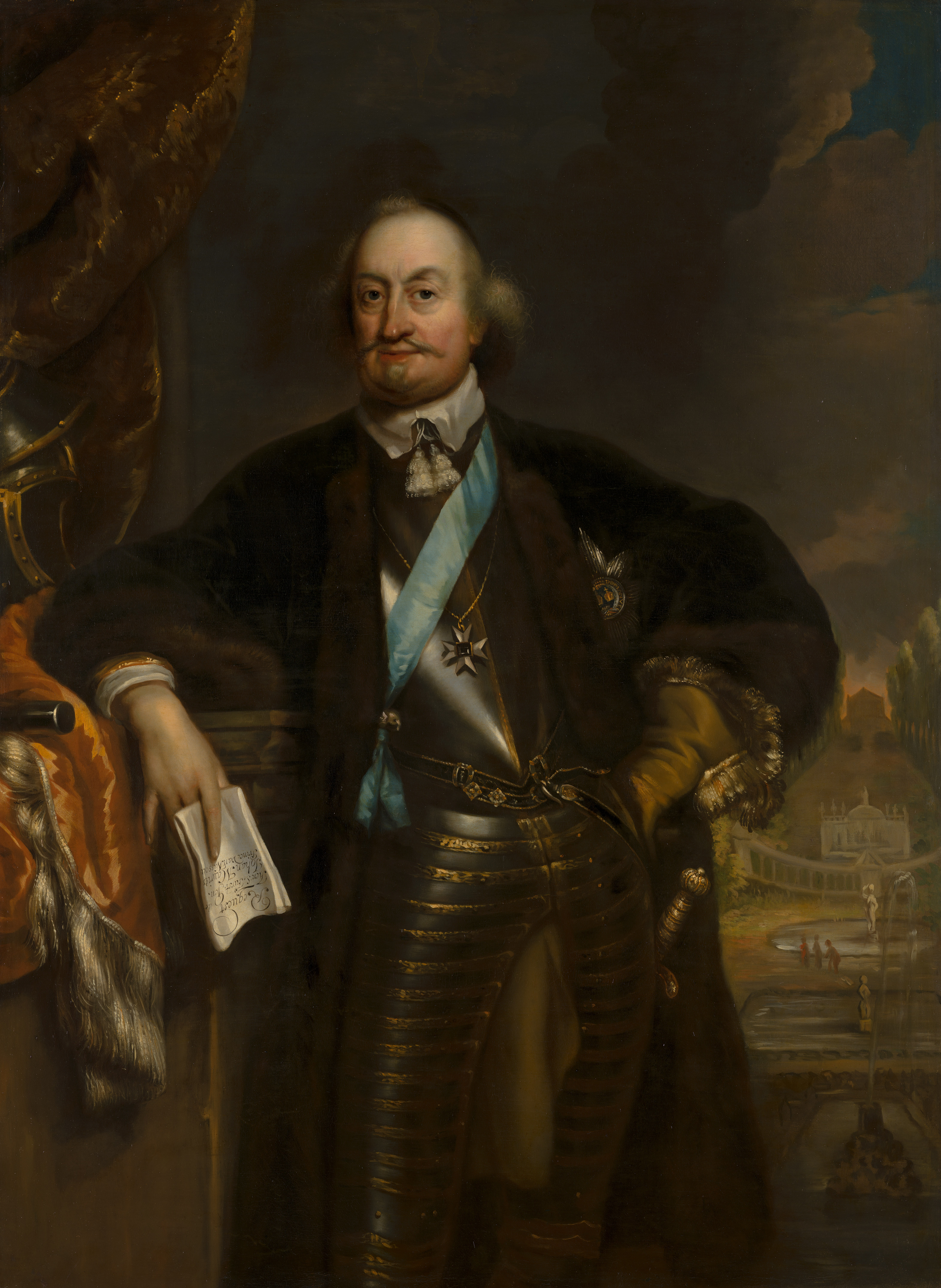
Fürst John Maurice of Nassau-Siegen (1604–1679). Portrait by Jan de Baen, c. 1668–1670. Mauritshuis, The Hague.

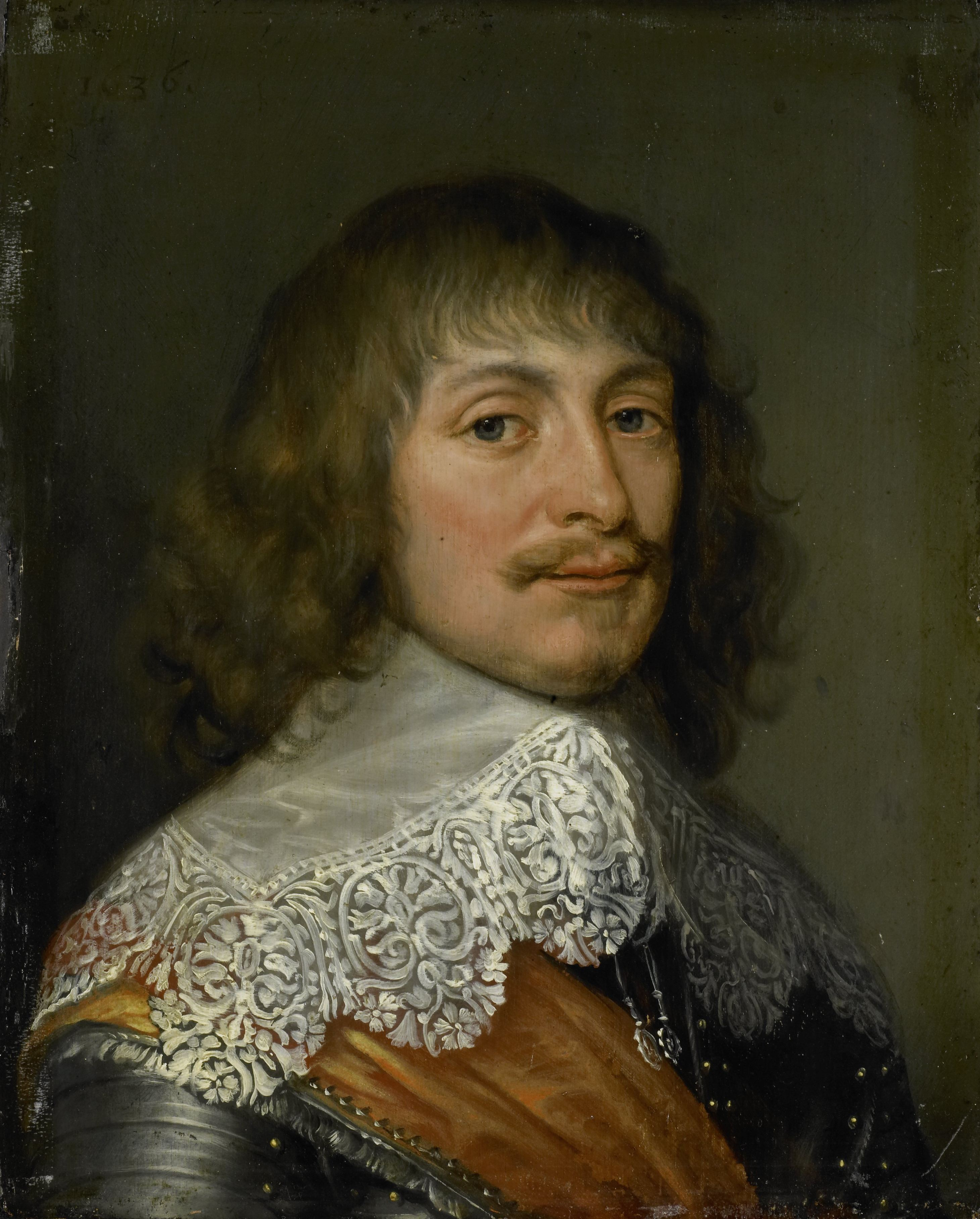
George Frederick of Nassau-Siegen (1606–1674). Anonymous portrait, 1636. Rijksmuseum Amsterdam.

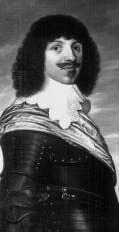
William Otto of Nassau-Siegen (1607–1641). Detail of a painting attributed to Wybrand de Geest, 1635–1640. Foundation Historical Collections of the House of Orange-Nassau, The Hague.

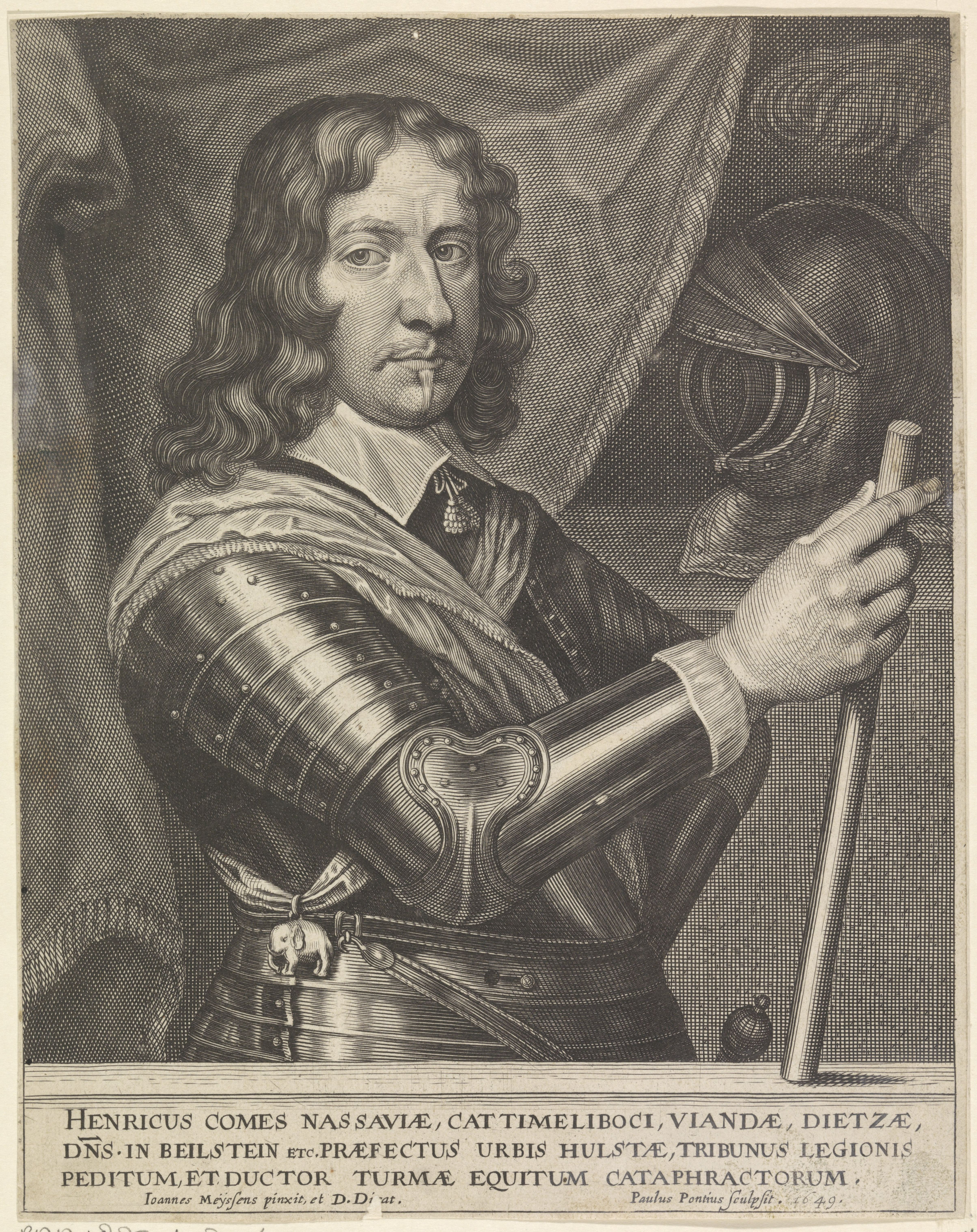
Henry of Nassau-Siegen (1611–1652). Print by Paulus Pontius after a painting by Joannes Meyssens, 1649. Rijksmuseum Amsterdam.

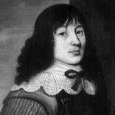
Christian of Nassau-Siegen (1616–1644). Detail of a painting attributed to Wybrand de Geest, 1635–1640. Foundation Historical Collections of the House of Orange-Nassau, The Hague.

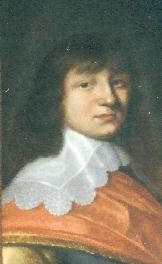
John Ernest of Nassau-Siegen (1618–1639). Detail of a painting by Gerard van Honthorst, c. 1633–1635. Stadhouderlijk Hof, Leeuwarden.

=== Known descendants ===
Margaret has several known descendants. Among them are:

- the Fürst of Liechtenstein,
- the head of the no longer reigning royal house of Austria,
- the head of the no longer reigning royal house of Bavaria,
- the French writer George Sand.

== Ancestors ==
Ancestors of Margaret of Schleswig-Holstein-Sonderburg
Great-great-grandparents	Christian I of Denmark (1426–1481) ⚭ 1449; Dorothea of Brandenburg (1430–1495)	John Cicero of Brandenburg (1455–1499) ⚭ 1476; Margaret of Thuringia (1449–1501)	John V of Saxe-Lauenburg (1439–1507) ⚭ 1464; Dorothea of Brandenburg (1446–1519)	Henry I the Elder of Brunswick-Wolfenbüttel (1463–1514) ⚭ 1486; Catherine of Pomerania (1465–1526)	Albrecht II of Brunswick-Grubenhagen (1419–1485) ⚭ 1471; Elisabeth of Waldeck (d. 1513)	Ernest II of Mansfeld (1479–1531) ⚭ 1500; Barbara of Querfurt (d. 1511)	Bogislaw X the Great of Pomerania (1454–1523) ⚭ 1491; Anne of Poland (1476–1503)	Philip the Sincere of the Palatinate (1448–1508) ⚭ 1474; Margaret of Bavaria (1456–1501)
Great-grandparents	Frederick I of Denmark (1471–1533) ⚭ 1502; Anne of Brandenburg (1487–1514)		Magnus I of Saxe-Lauenburg (d. 1543) ⚭ 1509; Catherine of Brunswick-Wolfenbüttel (d. 1563)		Philip I of Brunswick-Grubenhagen (c. 1476–1551) ⚭ 1517; Catherine of Mansfeld (1501–1535)		George I of Pomerania (1493–1531) ⚭ 1513; Amalie of the Palatinate (1490–1524)	
Grandparents	Christian III of Denmark (1503–1559) ⚭ 1525; Dorothea of Saxe-Lauenburg (1511–1571)				Ernest III of Brunswick-Grubenhagen (1518–1567) ⚭ 1547; Margaret of Pomerania (1518–1569)			
Parents	John II the Younger of Schleswig-Holstein-Sonderburg (1545–1622) ⚭ 1568; Elisabeth of Brunswick-Grubenhagen (1550–1586)							

== Sources ==
- Aßmann, Helmut & Menk, Friedhelm (1996). Auf den Spuren von Nassau und Oranien in Siegen (in German). Siegen: Gesellschaft für Stadtmarketing Siegen e.V.
- Behr, Kamill (1854). Genealogie der in Europa regierenden Fürstenhäuser (in German). Leipzig: Verlag von Bernhard Tauchnitz.
- Blok, P.J. (1911). "George Frederik, Georg Friedrich". In Molhuysen, P.C. & Blok, P.J. (eds.). Nieuw Nederlandsch Biografisch Woordenboek (in Dutch). Vol. Eerste deel. Leiden: A.W. Sijthoff. p. 926.
- Blok, P.J. (1911). "Johan VII". In Molhuysen, P.C. & Blok, P.J. (eds.). Nieuw Nederlandsch Biografisch Woordenboek (in Dutch). Vol. Eerste deel. Leiden: A.W. Sijthoff. p. 1221.
- De La Chenaye-Desbois, François Alexandre Aubert (1784). Recueil de généalogies, pour servir de suite ou de supplément au dictionnaire de la noblesse (in French). Vol. Tome IV. Paris: M. Badier. pp. 683–684.
- De La Chenaye-Desbois, François Alexandre Aubert (1876). Dictionnaire de la noblesse (in French). Vol. Tome Dix-Neuvième. Paris: Schlesinger. pp. 1033–1035.
- Dek, A.W.E. (1962). Graf Johann der Mittlere von Nassau-Siegen und seine 25 Kinder (in German). Rijswijk: Krips Repro.
- Dek, A.W.E. (1968). "De afstammelingen van Juliana van Stolberg tot aan het jaar van de Vrede van Münster". Spiegel der Historie. Maandblad voor de geschiedenis der Nederlanden (in Dutch). 1968 (7/8): 228–303.
- Dek, A.W.E. (1970). Genealogie van het Vorstenhuis Nassau (in Dutch). Zaltbommel: Europese Bibliotheek.
- Van Deursen, A.Th. (2000). Maurits van Nassau. De winnaar die faalde (in Dutch). Amsterdam: Uitgeverij Bert Bakker. ISBN 90-351-2272-0.
- Van Ditzhuyzen, Reinildis (2004) [1992]. Oranje-Nassau. Een biografisch woordenboek (in Dutch) (3rd ed.). Haarlem: Becht. ISBN 90-230-1124-4.
- von Ehrenkrook, Hans Friedrich; Förster, Karl & Marchtaler, Kurt Erhard (1928). Ahnenreihen aus allen deutschen Gauen. Beilage zum Archiv für Sippenforschung und allen verwandten Gebieten (in German). Görlitz: Verlag für Sippenforschung und Wappenkunde C.A. Starke.
- Elgenstierna, Gustaf (1936). Den Introducerade Svenska Adelns Ättartavlor (in Swedish). Vol. IX. Stockholm: P.A. Norstedt & Söners Förlag.
- Glawischnig, Rolf (1974). "Johann VII.". Neue Deutsche Biographie (in German). Vol. Band 10. Berlin: Duncker & Humblot. p. 501. ISBN 3-428-00191-5.
- Hæutle, Christian (1870). Genealogie des erlauchten Stammhauses Wittelsbach: von dessen Wiedereinsetzung in das Herzogthum Bayern (11. Sept. 1180) bis herab auf unsere Tage (in German). München: Hermann Manz'nsche Hofkunsthandlung und Buchhandlung.
- Huberty, Michel; Giraud, Alain & Magdelaine, F. & B. (1981). l'Allemagne Dynastique (in French). Vol. Tome III: Brunswick-Nassau-Schwarzbourg. Le Perreux: Alain Giraud.
- Huberty, Michel; Giraud, Alain & Magdelaine, F. & B. (1994). l'Allemagne Dynastique (in French). Vol. Tome VII: Oldenbourg-Familles alliées H-L. Le Perreux-sur-Marne: Alain Giraud.
- Joachim, Ernst (1881). "Johann der Mittlere von Nassau-Siegen". Allgemeine Deutsche Biographie (in German). Vol. Band 14. Leipzig: Duncker & Humblot. pp. 265–266.
- Kooijmans, Luuc (2000). Liefde in opdracht. Het hofleven van Willem Frederik van Nassau (in Dutch). Amsterdam: Uitgeverij Bert Bakker. ISBN 90-351-2201-1.
- Lück, Alfred (1981) [1967]. Siegerland und Nederland (in German) (2nd ed.). Siegen: Siegerländer Heimatverein e.V.
- Lück, Alfred & Wunderlich, Hermann (1956) [1952]. Die Fürstengruft zu Siegen (in German). Siegen: Verkehrsverein Siegen e.V.
- Menk, Friedhelm (1967). "Johann der Mittlere, Graf zu Nassau-Siegen (1561–1623) und seine zweite Gemahlin". Siegerland (in German). Band XLIV (Heft 1): 1–28.
- Menk, Friedhelm (1971). Quellen zur Geschichte des Siegerlandes im niederländischen königlichen Hausarchiv (in German). Siegen: Stadt Siegen/Forschungsstelle Siegerland.
- Menk, Friedhelm (1979). "Johann Moritz Fürst zu Nassau-Siegen". Siegerland (in German). Band LVI (Heft 1–2): 1vv.
- Menk, Friedhelm (2004). "Die Fürstengruft zu Siegen und die darin von 1669 bis 1781 erfolgten Beisetzungen". In Burwitz, Ludwig; Menk, Friedhelm; Opfermann, Ulrich Friedrich; Pfau, Dieter & Plaum, Bernd D. (eds.). Siegener Beiträge. Jahrbuch für regionale Geschichte (in German). Vol. 9. Siegen: Geschichtswerkstatt Siegen – Arbeitskreis für Regionalgeschichte e.V. pp. 183–202. ISSN 1431-6684.
- Spielmann, Christian (1909). Geschichte von Nassau (Land und Haus) von den ältesten Zeiten bis zur Gegenwart (in German). Vol. Teil 1. Politische Geschichten. Wiesbaden: P. Plauen.
- Textor von Haiger, Johann (1617). Nassauische Chronik. In welcher des vralt, hochlöblich, vnd weitberühmten Stamms vom Hause Naßaw, Printzen vnd Graven Genealogi oder Stammbaum: deren geburt, leben, heurath, kinder, zu Friden- vnd Kriegszeiten verzichtete sachen und thaten, absterben, und sonst denckwürdige Geschichten. Sampt einer kurtzen general Nassoviae und special Beschreibung der Graf- und Herschaften Naßaw-Catzenelnbogen, etc (in German). Herborn: Christoph Raab.
- Vorsterman van Oyen, A.A. (1882). Het vorstenhuis Oranje-Nassau. Van de vroegste tijden tot heden (in Dutch). Leiden & Utrecht: A.W. Sijthoff & J.L. Beijers.

Margaret of Schleswig-Holstein-Sonderburg House of Schleswig-Holstein-Sonderburg Born: 24 February 1583 Died: 10/20 April 1658
Regnal titles
Preceded by Johannetta of Sayn-Wittgenstein	Countess Consort of Nassau-Siegen; 8 October 1606 – 27 September 1623	Succeeded by Ernestine Yolande de Ligne
