= John Ernest of Nassau-Siegen (1618–1639) =

German count and naval officer in the Dutch West India Company (1618–1639)

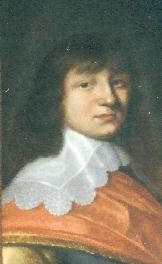
- Count John Ernest of Nassau-Siegen. Detail of a painting by Gerard van Honthorst, ca. 1633–1635. Stadhouderlijk Hof, Leeuwarden.

- Coat of arms
- Full name: John Ernest Count of Nassau-Siegen
- Native name: Johann Ernst Graf von Nassau-Siegen
- Born: Johann Ernst Graf zu Nassau, Katzenelnbogen, Vianden und Diez, Herr zu Beilstein; 8 November 1618^{Jul.} Siegen Castle
- Baptised: 10 January 1619^{Jul.} Siegen
- Died: 23 November 1639; São Salvador da Bahia de Todos os Santos
- Buried: 1 December 1639; Mauritsstad
- Noble family: House of Nassau-Siegen
- Spouse: –
- Issue: –
- Father: John VII 'the Middle' of Nassau-Siegen
- Mother: Margaret of Schleswig-Holstein-Sonderburg
- Occupation: Naval officer in the Dutch West India Company

Count John Ernest of Nassau-Siegen (8 November 1618^{Jul.} – 23 November 1639), German: Johann Ernst Graf von Nassau-Siegen, official titles: Graf zu Nassau, Katzenelnbogen, Vianden und Diez, Herr zu Beilstein, was a count from the House of Nassau-Siegen, a cadet branch of the Ottonian Line of the House of Nassau. He served as a naval officer in the Dutch West India Company.

== Biography ==
John Ernest was born at Siegen Castle (Note: The other sources that mention a place of birth, state Siegen as place of birth.) on 8 November 1618^{Jul.} (Note: "See various birth notifications preserved in the State Archives Wiesbaden (170^{III}): «den achten dieses v.s. vormittags, zwischen 8 u. 9 Uhr», and another in the National Archives of the Netherlands in The Hague, Inv. ns. Staten-Generaal 6049, drawn up in the same terms.") as the seventh and youngest son of Count John VII 'the Middle' of Nassau-Siegen and his second wife, Duchess Margaret of Schleswig-Holstein-Sonderburg. He was baptised in Siegen on 10 January 1619^{Jul.} and was named after his eldest halfbrother John Ernest, who died the previous year.

The will and testament of Count John VII 'the Middle' of 1621 bequeathed John Maurice and his younger brothers from their father's second marriage the district of Freudenberg, some villages in the Haingericht (Note: "The Haingericht was certainly located around the castle of Hainchen, which passed with its dependencies to the House of Nassau in 1313. See Historische Stätten Deutschlands III, 245.") and a third part of the administration of the city of Siegen. After his older half-brother John 'the Younger' had accepted the homage of the city of Siegen for the entire county of Nassau-Siegen on 12 January 1624 and had voluntarily ceded the sovereignty over the Hilchenbach district with Ginsburg Castle and some villages belonging to the Ferndorf and Netphen districts to his younger brother William on 13/23 January 1624, John Ernest and his brothers, with the exception of the oldest two brothers John Maurice and George Frederick, accepted only modest appanages.

John Ernest enlisted in the Dutch States Army under Prince Frederick Henry of Orange. He accompanied his eldest brother John Maurice to Dutch Brazil and served as a naval officer on the 'Alkmaar'. He died of dysentery in São Salvador da Bahia de Todos os Santos on 23 November 1639 aboard the 'Alkmaar', and was buried in the Calvinist church in Mauritsstad on 1 December.

The first stronghold built by the Dutch in Mauritsstad was named Fortress Ernestus after him.

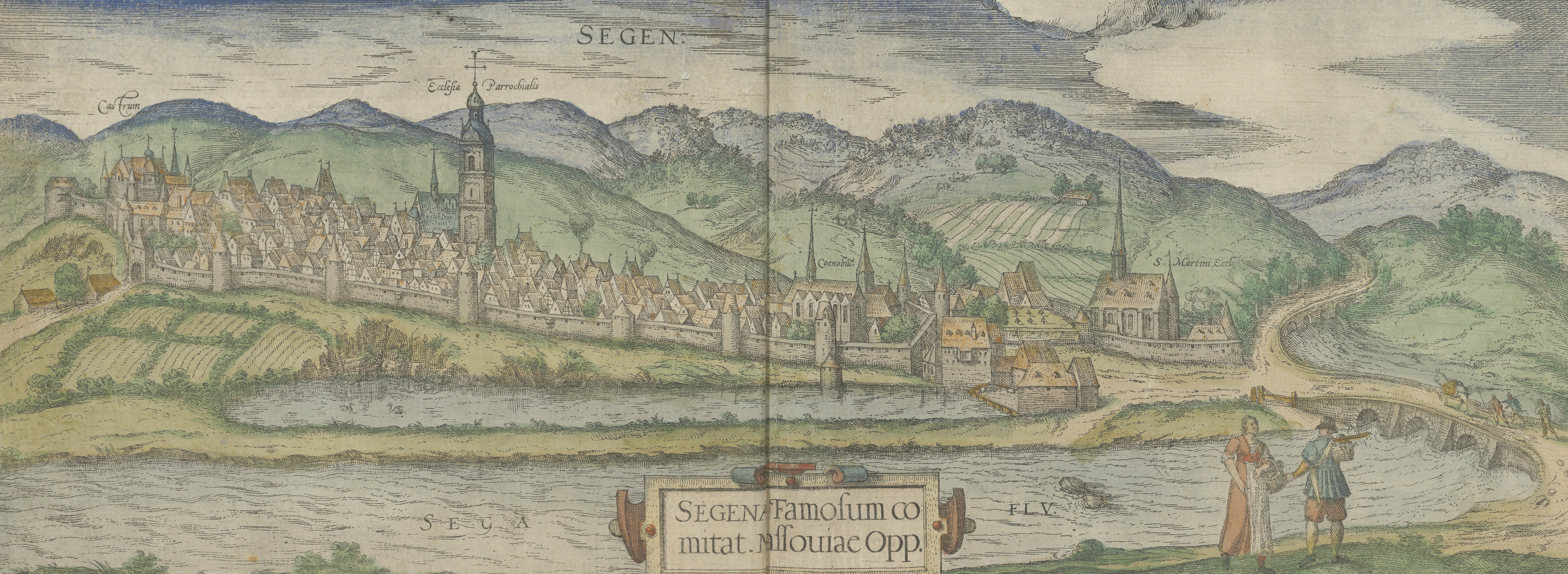
Siegen in 1617. From Braun & Hogenberg, Civitates orbis terrarum Band 6, Cologne, 1617. On the left Siegen Castle.

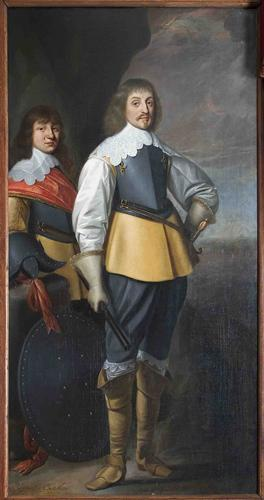
Count John Ernest with his eldest brother John Maurice.

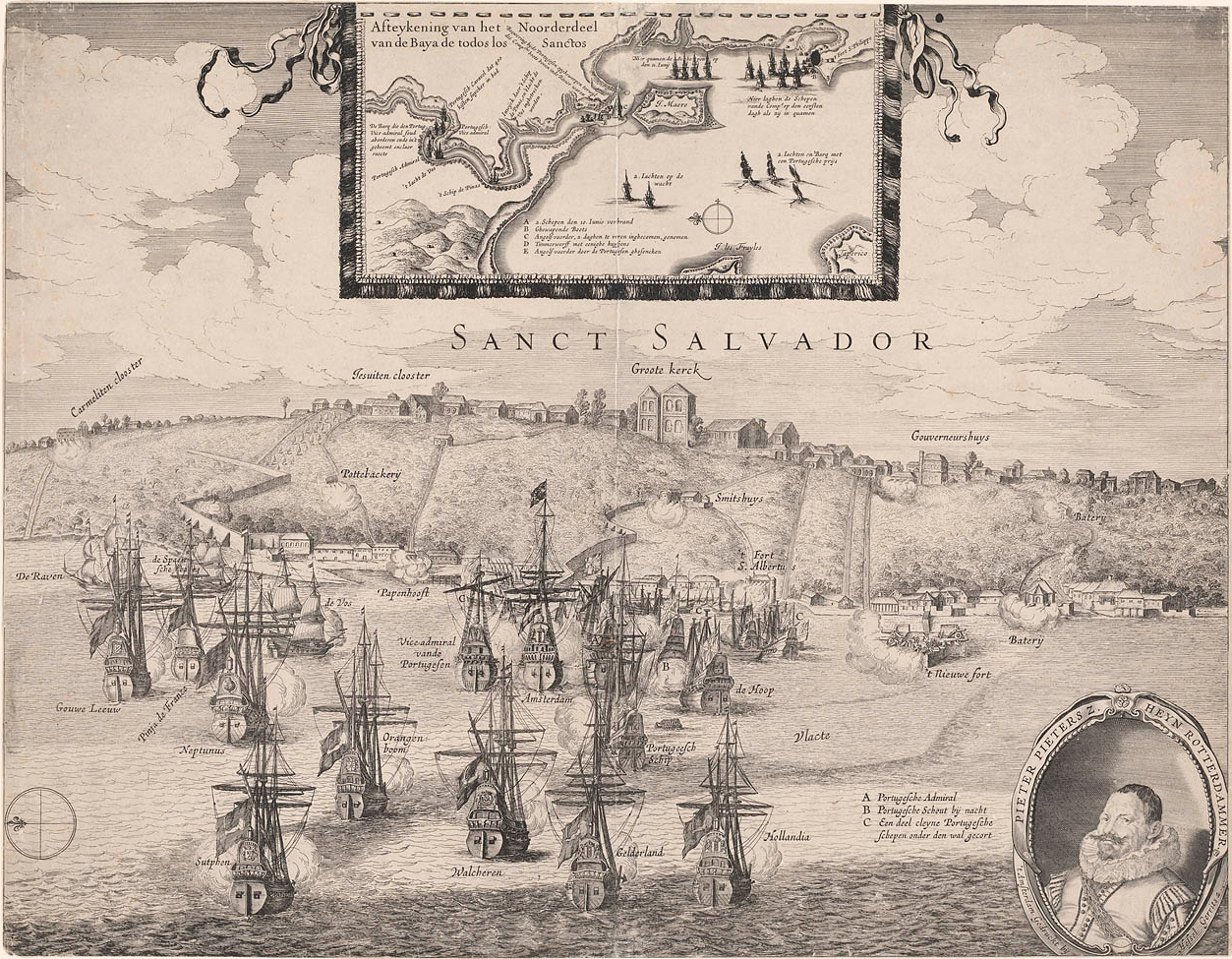
São Salvador da Bahia de Todos os Santos. Engraving by Hessel Gerritsz, 1627.

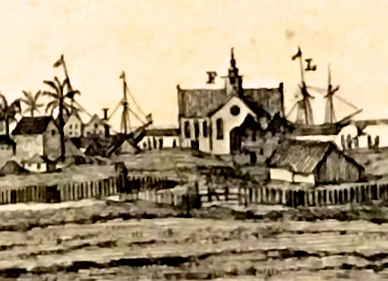
The Calvinist church in Mauritsstad. Detail of an engraving by Frans Post, 1647.

== Ancestors ==
Ancestors of John Ernest of Nassau-Siegen
Great-great-grandparents	John V of Nassau-Siegen (1455–1516) ⚭ 1482; Elisabeth of Hesse-Marburg (1466–1523)	Bodo III 'the Blissful' of Stolberg-Wernigerode (1467–1538) ⚭ 1500; Anna of Eppstein-Königstein (1481–1538)	John IV of Leuchtenberg (1470–1531) ⚭ 1502; Margaret of Schwarzburg-Blankenburg (1482–1518)	Frederick V 'the Elder' of Brandenburg-Ansbach (1460–1536) ⚭ 1479; Sophia of Poland (1464–1512)	Frederick I of Denmark (1471–1533) ⚭ 1502; Anne of Brandenburg (1487–1514)	Magnus I of Saxe-Lauenburg (?–1543) ⚭ 1509; Catherine of Brunswick-Wolfenbüttel (?–1563)	Philip I of Brunswick-Grubenhagen (ca. 1476–1551) ⚭ 1517; Catherine of Mansfeld (1501–1535)	George I of Pomerania (1493–1531) ⚭ 1513; Amalie of the Palatinate (1490–1524)
Great-grandparents	William I 'the Rich' of Nassau-Siegen (1487–1559) ⚭ 1531; Juliane of Stolberg-Wernigerode (1506–1580)		George III of Leuchtenberg (1502–1555) ⚭ 1528; Barbara of Brandenburg-Ansbach (1495–1552)		Christian III of Denmark (1503–1559) ⚭ 1525; Dorothea of Saxe-Lauenburg (1511–1571)		Ernest V of Brunswick-Grubenhagen (1518–1567) ⚭ 1547; Margaret of Pomerania (1518–1569)	
Grandparents	John VI 'the Elder' of Nassau-Siegen (1536–1606) ⚭ 1559; Elisabeth of Leuchtenberg (1537–1579)				John 'the Younger' of Schleswig-Holstein-Sonderburg (1545–1622) ⚭ 1568; Elisabeth of Brunswick-Grubenhagen (1550–1586)			
Parents	John VII 'the Middle' of Nassau-Siegen (1561–1623) ⚭ 1603; Margaret of Schleswig-Holstein-Sonderburg (1583–1658)							

== Sources ==
- Aßmann, Helmut & Menk, Friedhelm (1996). Auf den Spuren von Nassau und Oranien in Siegen (in German). Siegen: Gesellschaft für Stadtmarketing Siegen e.V.
- Behr, Kamill (1854). Genealogie der in Europa regierenden Fürstenhäuser (in German). Leipzig: Verlag von Bernhard Tauchnitz.
- Blok, P.J. (1911). "Johan Ernst II". In Molhuysen, P.C. & Blok, P.J. (eds.). Nieuw Nederlandsch Biografisch Woordenboek (in Dutch). Vol. Eerste deel. Leiden: A.W. Sijthoff. p. 1222.
- Dek, A.W.E. (1962). Graf Johann der Mittlere von Nassau-Siegen und seine 25 Kinder (in German). Rijswijk: Krips Repro.
- Dek, A.W.E. (1968). "De afstammelingen van Juliana van Stolberg tot aan het jaar van de Vrede van Münster". Spiegel der Historie. Maandblad voor de geschiedenis der Nederlanden (in Dutch). 1968 (7/8): 228–303.
- Dek, A.W.E. (1970). Genealogie van het Vorstenhuis Nassau (in Dutch). Zaltbommel: Europese Bibliotheek.
- von Ehrenkrook, Hans Friedrich; Förster, Karl & Marchtaler, Kurt Erhard (1928). Ahnenreihen aus allen deutschen Gauen. Beilage zum Archiv für Sippenforschung und allen verwandten Gebieten (in German). Görlitz: Verlag für Sippenforschung und Wappenkunde C.A. Starke.
- Huberty, Michel; Giraud, Alain & Magdelaine, F. & B. (1981). l'Allemagne Dynastique (in French). Vol. Tome III: Brunswick-Nassau-Schwarzbourg. Le Perreux: Alain Giraud.
- Huberty, Michel; Giraud, Alain & Magdelaine, F. & B. (1994). l'Allemagne Dynastique (in French). Vol. Tome VII: Oldenbourg-Familles alliées H-L. Le Perreux-sur-Marne: Alain Giraud.
- Lück, Alfred (1981) [1967]. Siegerland und Nederland (in German) (2nd ed.). Siegen: Siegerländer Heimatverein e.V.
- Lück, Alfred & Wunderlich, Hermann (1956) [1952]. Die Fürstengruft zu Siegen (in German). Siegen: Verkehrsverein Siegen e.V.
- Menk, Friedhelm (1967). "Johann der Mittlere, Graf zu Nassau-Siegen (1561–1623) und seine zweite Gemahlin". Siegerland (in German). Band XLIV (Heft 1): 1–28.
- Menk, Friedhelm (1971). Quellen zur Geschichte des Siegerlandes im niederländischen königlichen Hausarchiv (in German). Siegen: Stadt Siegen/Forschungsstelle Siegerland.
- Menk, Friedhelm (1979). "Johann Moritz Fürst zu Nassau-Siegen". Siegerland (in German). Band LVI (Heft 1–2): 1vv.
- Schutte, O. (1979). "Genealogische gegevens". In Tamse, C.A. (ed.). Nassau en Oranje in de Nederlandse geschiedenis (in Dutch). Alphen aan den Rijn: A.W. Sijthoff. pp. 40–44, 224–228. ISBN 90-218-2447-7.
- Spielmann, Christian (1909). Geschichte von Nassau (Land und Haus) von den ältesten Zeiten bis zur Gegenwart (in German). Vol. Teil 1. Politische Geschichten. Wiesbaden: P. Plauen.
- Textor von Haiger, Johann (1617). Nassauische Chronik (in German). Herborn: Christoph Raab.
- Vorsterman van Oyen, A.A. (1882). Het vorstenhuis Oranje-Nassau. Van de vroegste tijden tot heden (in Dutch). Leiden/Utrecht: A.W. Sijthoff/J.L. Beijers.
