= William Otto of Nassau-Siegen =

German count and officer in the Swedish Army (1607–1641)

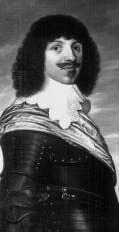
- Count William Otto of Nassau-Siegen. Detail from a painting attributed to Wybrand de Geest, 1635–1640. Foundation Historical Collections of the House of Orange-Nassau, The Hague.

- Coat of arms
- Full name: William Otto Count of Nassau-Siegen
- Native name: Wilhelm Otto Graf von Nassau-Siegen
- Born: Wilhelm Otto Graf zu Nassau, Katzenelnbogen, Vianden und Diez, Herr zu Beilstein; 23 June 1607; Dillenburg Castle
- Died: 14 August 1641 (aged 34) near Wolfenbüttel
- Buried: 16 September 1641; Kassel
- Noble family: House of Nassau-Siegen
- Spouse: –
- Issue: –
- Father: John VII 'the Middle' of Nassau-Siegen
- Mother: Margaret of Schleswig-Holstein-Sonderburg
- Occupation: Officer in the Swedish Army

Count William Otto of Nassau-Siegen (23 June 1607 – 14 August 1641), German: Wilhelm Otto Graf von Nassau-Siegen, official titles: Graf zu Nassau, Katzenelnbogen, Vianden und Diez, Herr zu Beilstein, was a count from the House of Nassau-Siegen, a cadet branch of the Ottonian Line of the House of Nassau. He served as an officer in the Swedish Army.

== Biography ==
William Otto was born at Dillenburg Castle (Note: The other sources that mention a place of birth, state Dillenburg as place of birth.) on 23 June 1607 as the third son of Count John VII 'the Middle' of Nassau-Siegen and his second wife, Duchess Margaret of Schleswig-Holstein-Sonderburg. William Otto studied in Kassel in 1622 together with his elder brother George Frederick.

The will and testament of Count John VII 'the Middle' of 1621 bequeathed John Maurice and his younger brothers from their father's second marriage the district of Freudenberg, some villages in the Haingericht (Note: "The Haingericht was certainly located around the castle of Hainchen, which passed with its dependencies to the House of Nassau in 1313. See Historische Stätten Deutschlands III, 245.") and a third part of the administration of the city of Siegen. After his older half-brother John 'the Younger' had accepted the homage of the city of Siegen for the entire county of Nassau-Siegen on 12 January 1624 and had voluntarily ceded the sovereignty over the Hilchenbach district with Ginsburg Castle and some villages belonging to the Ferndorf and Netphen districts to his younger brother William on 13/23 January 1624, William Otto and his younger brothers accepted only modest appanages. His older brothers John Maurice and George Frederick did not.

During the Thirty Years' War William Otto served in the Swedish Army (Note: Vorsterman van Oyen (1882), p. 119 is the only to mention that he held the rank of general.) under Duke Bernhard of Saxe-Weimar. When the latter died in 1639, he bequeathed to William Otto a riding horse and 10,000 Rhineland Thalers. William Otto occupied Kreuznach and Bingen in 1639 and Braunfels in 1640. He was killed in a cavalry battle near Wolfenbüttel on 14 August 1641, (Note: "See Dek (1962); State Archives Wiesbaden (170^{III}): notification addressed to Count Christian from the army camp at Wolfenbüttel 15‑8‑1641: «gestrigen Tages uff einer partey einen tödlichen Schuss bekommen, und hernach alsobalden diese Welt gesegnet».") and was buried in Kassel on 16 September 1641.

William Otto was the only one of the many sons of Count John VII 'the Middle' who never served the Dutch Republic.

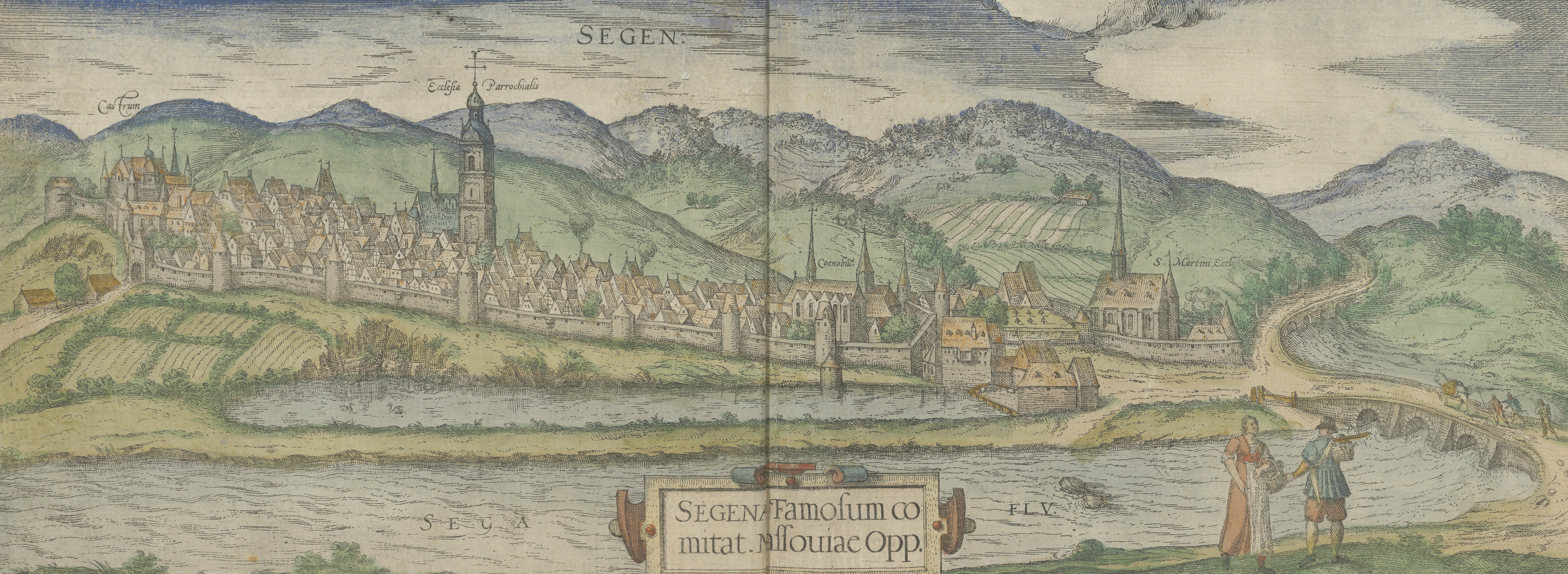
Siegen in 1617. From Braun & Hogenberg, Civitates orbis terrarum Band 6, Cologne, 1617. On the left Siegen Castle.

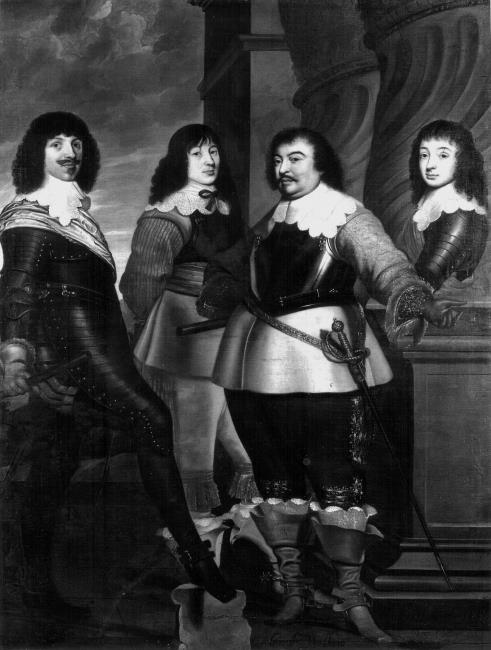
Group portrait of Count William of Nassau-Siegen with his son Maurice Frederick and his halfbrothers William Otto and Christian.

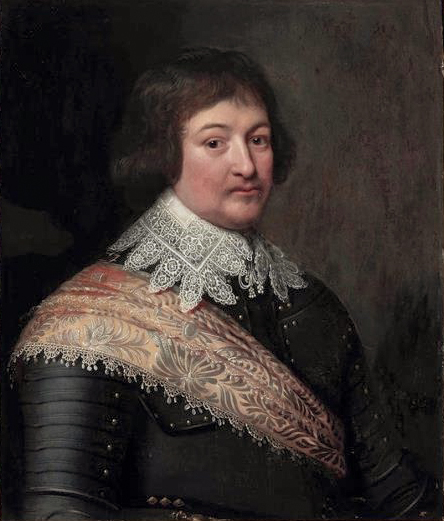
Duke Bernhard of Saxe-Weimar. Portrait by Michiel van Mierevelt, 1630. Private collection.

== Ancestors ==
Ancestors of William Otto of Nassau-Siegen
Great-great-grandparents	John V of Nassau-Siegen (1455–1516) ⚭ 1482; Elisabeth of Hesse-Marburg (1466–1523)	Bodo III 'the Blissful' of Stolberg-Wernigerode (1467–1538) ⚭ 1500; Anna of Eppstein-Königstein (1481–1538)	John IV of Leuchtenberg (1470–1531) ⚭ 1502; Margaret of Schwarzburg-Blankenburg (1482–1518)	Frederick V 'the Elder' of Brandenburg-Ansbach (1460–1536) ⚭ 1479; Sophia of Poland (1464–1512)	Frederick I of Denmark (1471–1533) ⚭ 1502; Anne of Brandenburg (1487–1514)	Magnus I of Saxe-Lauenburg (?–1543) ⚭ 1509; Catherine of Brunswick-Wolfenbüttel (?–1563)	Philip I of Brunswick-Grubenhagen (ca. 1476–1551) ⚭ 1517; Catherine of Mansfeld (1501–1535)	George I of Pomerania (1493–1531) ⚭ 1513; Amalie of the Palatinate (1490–1524)
Great-grandparents	William I 'the Rich' of Nassau-Siegen (1487–1559) ⚭ 1531; Juliane of Stolberg-Wernigerode (1506–1580)		George III of Leuchtenberg (1502–1555) ⚭ 1528; Barbara of Brandenburg-Ansbach (1495–1552)		Christian III of Denmark (1503–1559) ⚭ 1525; Dorothea of Saxe-Lauenburg (1511–1571)		Ernest V of Brunswick-Grubenhagen (1518–1567) ⚭ 1547; Margaret of Pomerania (1518–1569)	
Grandparents	John VI 'the Elder' of Nassau-Siegen (1536–1606) ⚭ 1559; Elisabeth of Leuchtenberg (1537–1579)				John 'the Younger' of Schleswig-Holstein-Sonderburg (1545–1622) ⚭ 1568; Elisabeth of Brunswick-Grubenhagen (1550–1586)			
Parents	John VII 'the Middle' of Nassau-Siegen (1561–1623) ⚭ 1603; Margaret of Schleswig-Holstein-Sonderburg (1583–1658)							

== Sources ==
- Behr, Kamill (1854). Genealogie der in Europa regierenden Fürstenhäuser (in German). Leipzig: Verlag von Bernhard Tauchnitz.
- Dek, A.W.E. (1962). Graf Johann der Mittlere von Nassau-Siegen und seine 25 Kinder (in German). Rijswijk: Krips Repro.
- Dek, A.W.E. (1968). "De afstammelingen van Juliana van Stolberg tot aan het jaar van de Vrede van Münster". Spiegel der Historie. Maandblad voor de geschiedenis der Nederlanden (in Dutch). 1968 (7/8): 228–303.
- Dek, A.W.E. (1970). Genealogie van het Vorstenhuis Nassau (in Dutch). Zaltbommel: Europese Bibliotheek.
- von Ehrenkrook, Hans Friedrich; Förster, Karl & Marchtaler, Kurt Erhard (1928). Ahnenreihen aus allen deutschen Gauen. Beilage zum Archiv für Sippenforschung und allen verwandten Gebieten (in German). Görlitz: Verlag für Sippenforschung und Wappenkunde C.A. Starke.
- Huberty, Michel; Giraud, Alain & Magdelaine, F. & B. (1981). l'Allemagne Dynastique (in French). Vol. Tome III: Brunswick-Nassau-Schwarzbourg. Le Perreux: Alain Giraud.
- Huberty, Michel; Giraud, Alain & Magdelaine, F. & B. (1994). l'Allemagne Dynastique (in French). Vol. Tome VII: Oldenbourg-Familles alliées H-L. Le Perreux-sur-Marne: Alain Giraud.
- Lück, Alfred (1981) [1967]. Siegerland und Nederland (in German) (2nd ed.). Siegen: Siegerländer Heimatverein e.V.
- Menk, Friedhelm (1967). "Johann der Mittlere, Graf zu Nassau-Siegen (1561–1623) und seine zweite Gemahlin". Siegerland (in German). Band XLIV (Heft 1): 1–28.
- Menk, Friedhelm (1971). Quellen zur Geschichte des Siegerlandes im niederländischen königlichen Hausarchiv (in German). Siegen: Stadt Siegen/Forschungsstelle Siegerland.
- Menk, Friedhelm (1979). "Johann Moritz Fürst zu Nassau-Siegen". Siegerland (in German). Band LVI (Heft 1–2): 1vv.
- Schutte, O. (1979). "Genealogische gegevens". In Tamse, C.A. (ed.). Nassau en Oranje in de Nederlandse geschiedenis (in Dutch). Alphen aan den Rijn: A.W. Sijthoff. pp. 40–44, 224–228. ISBN 90-218-2447-7.
- Spielmann, Christian (1909). Geschichte von Nassau (Land und Haus) von den ältesten Zeiten bis zur Gegenwart (in German). Vol. Teil 1. Politische Geschichten. Wiesbaden: P. Plauen.
- Textor von Haiger, Johann (1617). Nassauische Chronik (in German). Herborn: Christoph Raab.
- Vorsterman van Oyen, A.A. (1882). Het vorstenhuis Oranje-Nassau. Van de vroegste tijden tot heden (in Dutch). Leiden/Utrecht: A.W. Sijthoff/J.L. Beijers.
