= Yorktown, Virginia =

- Town
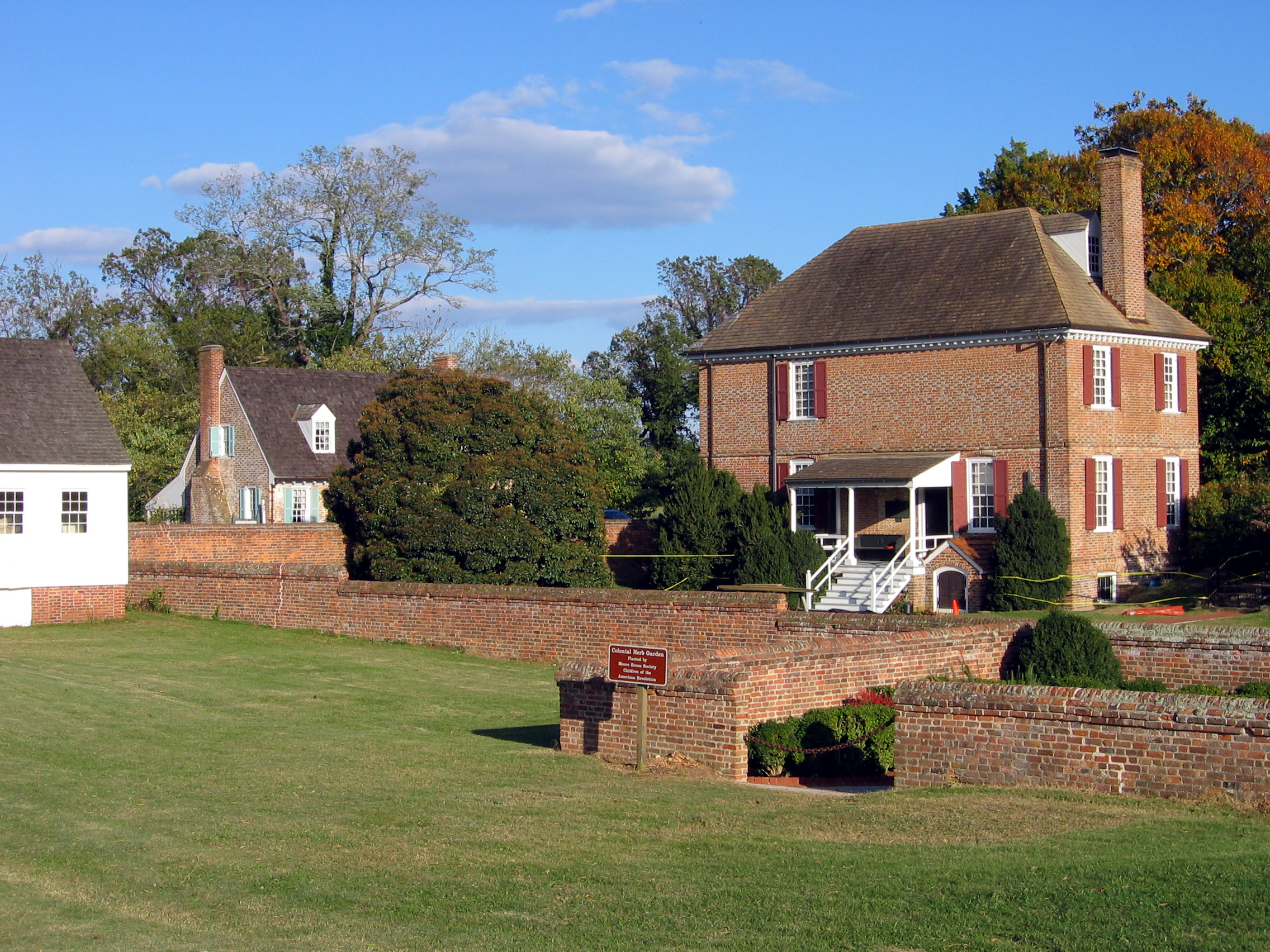
- Yorktown customhouse, May 2011

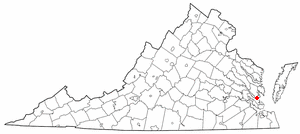
- Location of Yorktown in Virginia
- Coordinates: 37°14′4″N 76°30′35″W
- Country: United States
- State: Virginia
- County: York

Area
  - Total: 0.6 sq mi (1.6 km^{2})
  - Land: 0.6 sq mi (1.6 km^{2})
  - Water: 0.0 sq mi (0 km^{2})
- Elevation: 13 ft (4.0 m)

Population (2020)
  - Total: 201
  - Density: 340/sq mi (130/km^{2})
- Time zone: UTC-5 (Eastern (EST))
  - Summer (DST): UTC-4 (EDT)
- ZIP codes: 23690–23693
- Area codes: 757, 948
- FIPS code: 51-88240
- GNIS feature ID: 1500081

Yorktown is a town in York County, Virginia, United States. It is the county seat of York County, one of the eight original shires formed in colonial Virginia in 1682. Yorktown's population was 221 as of the 2020 census, while York County's population was 70,045.

The town is most famous as the site of the siege and subsequent surrender of General Charles Cornwallis to General George Washington and the French Fleet during the American Revolutionary War on October 19, 1781. Although the larger European war (Anglo-French War (1778–1783), Anglo-Spanish War (1779–1783), Fourth Anglo-Dutch War (1780–1784)) would last for another year, this British defeat at Yorktown effectively ended the war in North America. Yorktown also figured prominently in the American Civil War (1861–1865), serving as a major port to supply both northern and southern towns, depending upon who held Yorktown at the time.

Yorktown is one of three sites of the Historic Triangle, which also includes Jamestown and Williamsburg as important colonial-era settlements. It is the eastern terminus of the Colonial Parkway connecting these locations. Yorktown is also the eastern terminus of the TransAmerica Trail, a bicycle touring route created by the Adventure Cycling Association.

One of Yorktown's historic sister cities is Zweibrücken, Germany, due to the participation of a unit from the town in the American Revolutionary War.

== History ==
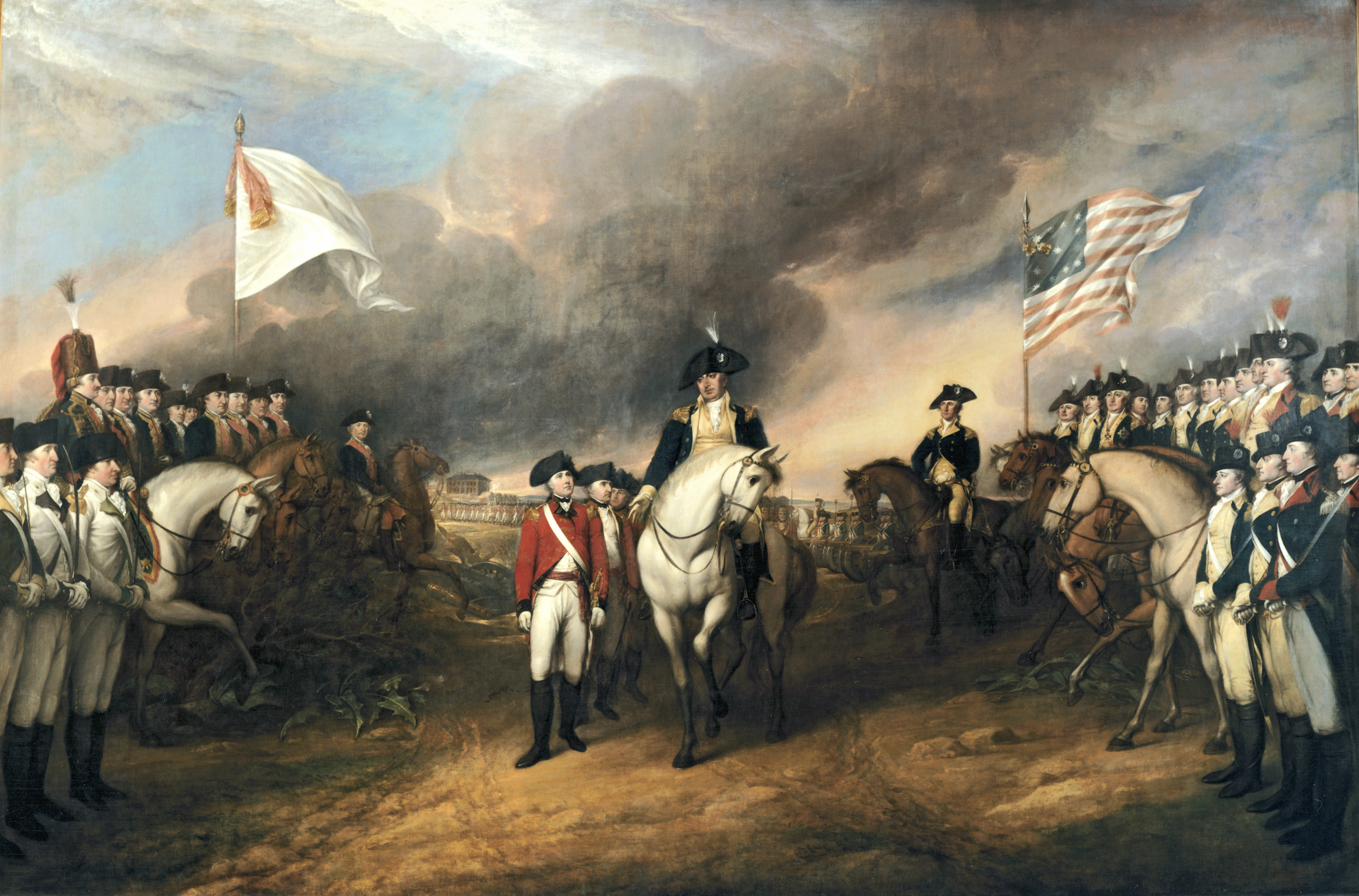
Surrender of Lord Cornwallis at Yorktown in 1781 depicted in a painting by John Trumbull

Yorktown was named for the ancient city of York in Yorkshire, Northern England. It was founded in 1691 as a port on the York River for English colonists to export tobacco to Europe. The lawyer Thomas Ballard was the principal founder of the city along with Joseph Ring. It became the county seat in 1696, and although it never had more than about 200 houses its trade was considerable until the American Revolutionary War. It was called "York" until after the war, when the name "Yorktown" came into common use.

The town reached the height of its development around 1750, when it had 250 to 300 buildings and a population of almost 2,000 people. It was the base of British General Charles Cornwallis during the 1781 siege, which was the last major battle of the American Revolutionary War.

When waterways were critical to transportation, Yorktown was thought to occupy a strategic location controlling upstream portions of the York River and its tributaries and their access to the Chesapeake Bay. In his Notes on the State of Virginia published in 1781–82, Thomas Jefferson noted that the York River at Yorktown "affords the best harbour in the state for vessels of the largest size. The river there narrows to the width of a mile, and is contained within very high banks, close under which the vessels may ride."

The population dropped in Yorktown and other areas of the mostly rural peninsula after the state's capital was relocated from Williamsburg to Richmond on the James River, attracting more development there. In addition, tobacco exhausted the soil, and planters shifted to mixed crops, which required less slave labor. Many generations of younger sons migrated out of the Tidewater area to new lands further west, into the Piedmont and beyond to Kentucky, Tennessee and what became the Northwest Territory.

During the 1862 Peninsula Campaign of the American Civil War (1861–1865), the town was captured by the Union following the Siege and Battle of Yorktown. It was used as a base by the Union Army of the Potomac under General George B. McClellan to launch an attack on Richmond.

One of Yorktown's sister cities is Zweibrücken, Germany. During the American Revolutionary War, the Royal Deux-Ponts Regiment was commanded by Comte Christian de Forbach (son of Christian IV, Count Palatine of Zweibrücken, and the deputy commander was his brother Philippe Guillaume (later renamed to Wilhelm). This was one of the four regiments that arrived at Newport, Rhode Island with Rochambeau in 1780. It participated on the side of Americans in the Battle of Yorktown in 1781.

Yorktown's other sister city is Port-Vendres, France. It's from this small port on the Mediterranean coast that the French expeditionary force left Europe to fight the British army in America.

During World War I, to support Atlantic defenses, the federal government in 1918 acquired about 13,000 acres (53 km^{2}) for development by the US Navy as Mine Depot, Yorktown. This large installation straddled York, Warwick and James City counties. It has since expanded and been developed as Naval Weapons Station Yorktown. Cheatham Annex, a facility which was developed over the former town of Penniman, is also included as part of the base.

Training Center Yorktown serves as a training school for the United States Coast Guard. Also relatively close to Yorktown are Camp Peary (in York County), the Huntington Ingalls Industries Newport News Shipbuilding yards and facilities, and Fort Eustis Army base (both in Newport News). Other major installations in the area are Naval Station Norfolk, located at Norfolk, and Langley Air Force Base in Hampton.

== Description ==
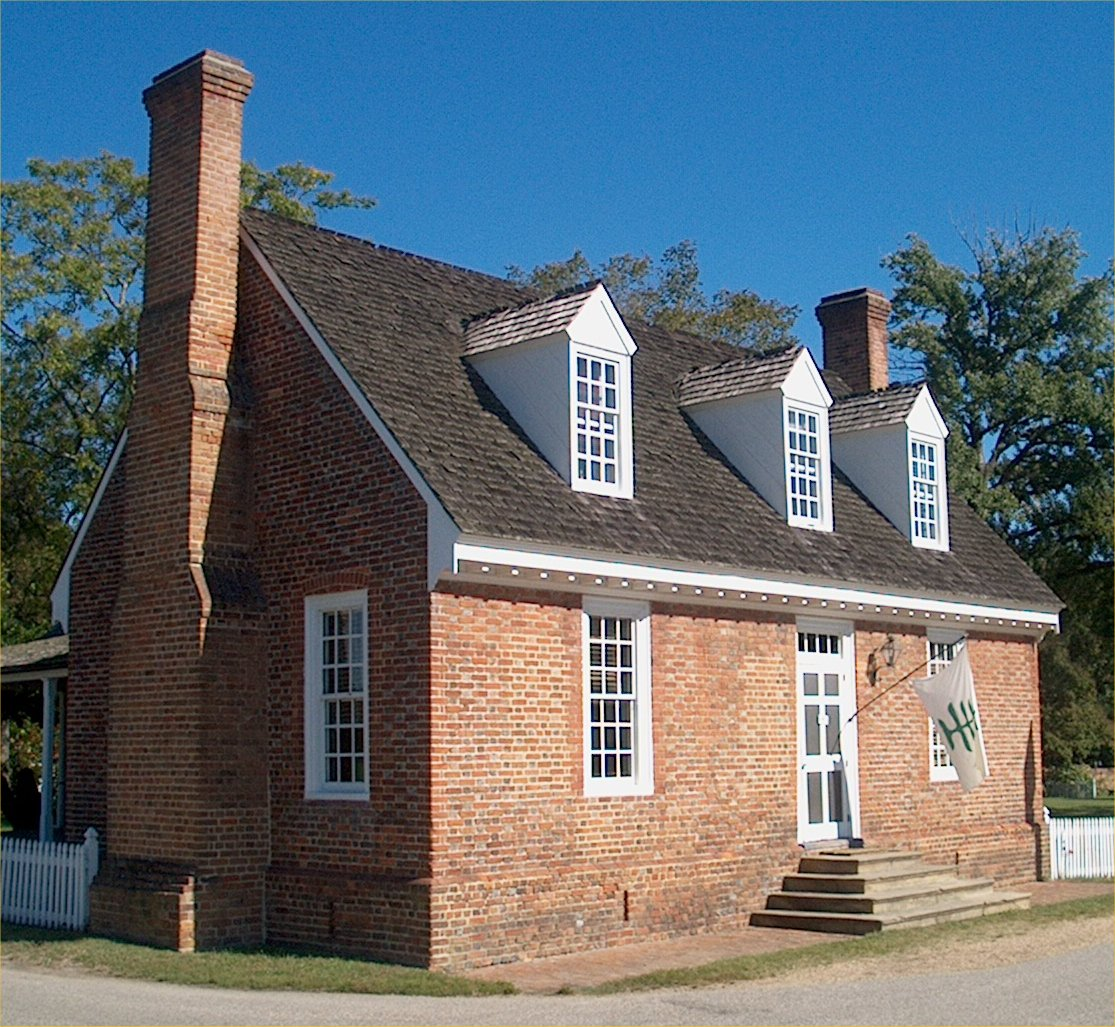
The Somerwell House (c.1700) on Main Street.

In the early 21st century, Yorktown is popular as a destination for heritage tourism. Yorktown Village or Historic Yorktown is located close to the York River near the George P. Coleman Memorial Bridge that spans the river to Gloucester Point. Historic Yorktown is comprised first of Water Street, a small strip along the beach of the river; it contains several small restaurants, a park, a hotel, a pier, and an antiques shop. In May 2005 a building was constructed with more shops and restaurants, enhancing what is known as the "Riverwalk" section on the waterfront.

Next, Main Street is located on a bluff above the floodplain. Architecture in this area is almost exclusively original to the colonial era. Nine buildings, including the circa-1730 Nelson House and Somerwell House (see photo), survive from the pre-Revolutionary period. The old court house, several small shops, the Nelson House, and the Yorktown Monument are located along this road. Around the center of the town are residential streets. Grace Episcopal Church, situated on Church Street near the old courthouse, is noted for its architecture.

== Honors ==
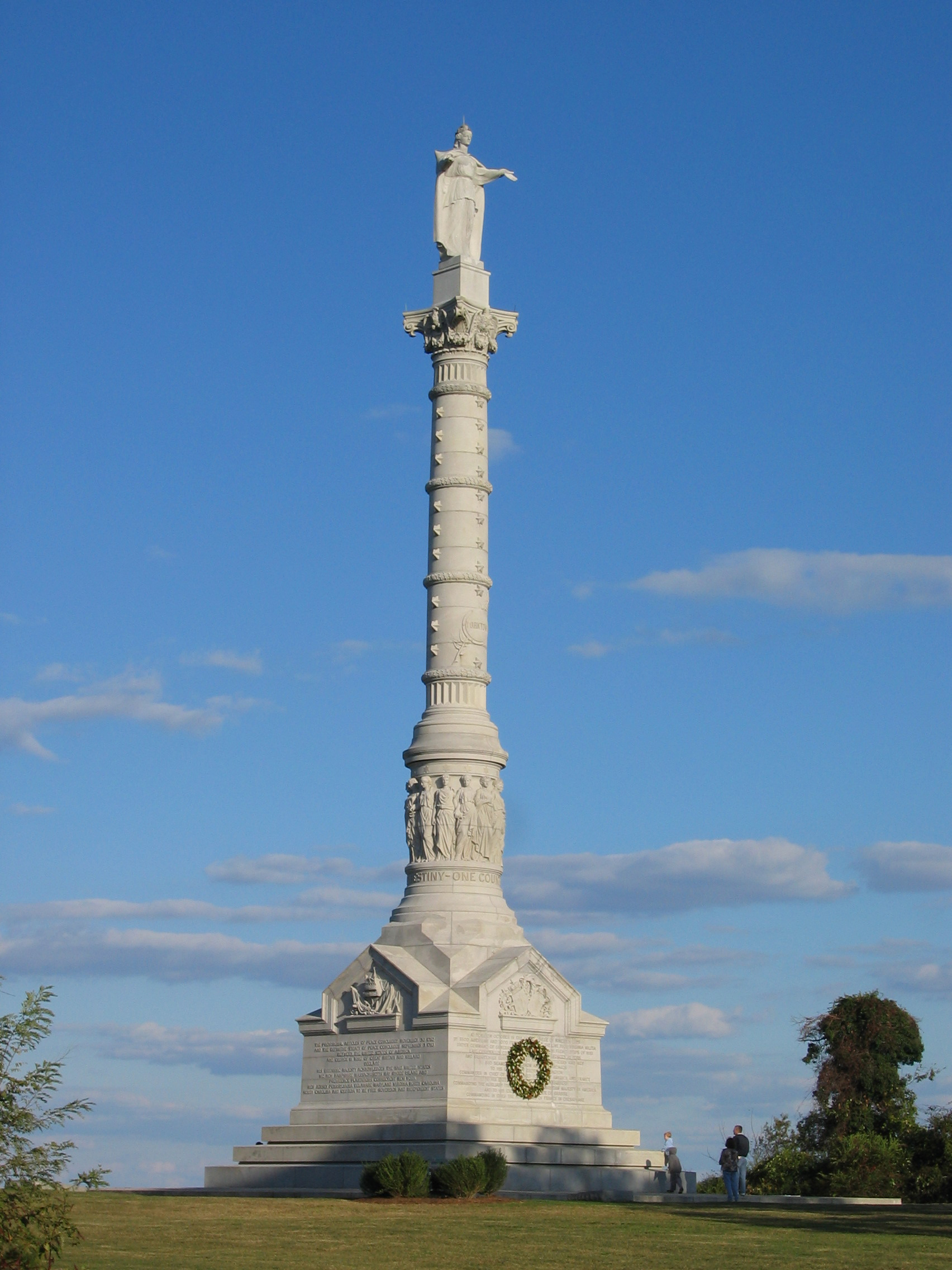
This monument at Yorktown celebrating victory in the American Revolutionary War was erected in 1884. It has a total height of 29.87 metres (98 ft)

Yorktown and the nearby area are significant to the early history of the United States. Colonial National Historical Park, which contains and preserves Yorktown National Battlefield and Yorktown National Cemetery, is located on the outskirts of town. The battlefield has many of the earthworks dug by the besieging American and French forces.

The Yorktown Victory Monument, commemorating the victory, the alliance with France that brought it about, and the resulting peace with Great Britain after the war, is located just outside the current town. Designed by New York City architect Richard Morris Hunt, the monument was installed in 1884 and topped by a figure of Liberty sculpted by John Quincy Adams Ward. That element was destroyed by lightning in 1942. It was replaced in 1957 by a figure of Victory by Oskar J. W. Hansen. A memorial to the French war dead of the Yorktown campaign is being planned for construction at the French cemetery on the site of the battle.

== Transportation ==
U.S. Route 17, also known as George Washington Memorial Highway, is the primary thoroughfare of Yorktown. It carries traffic via the George P. Coleman Memorial Bridge across the York River. York County has grown rapidly, and since the late 20th century, the stretch of U.S. 17 that passes through this area has become a heavily traveled route on which numerous strip malls and commercial areas have been developed. Many of the residential areas of York County branch off Route 17 or are near Interstate 64. Little of the recent residential or business development of York County has occurred close to Yorktown. It is being protected and managed as a historical colonial village, much like Williamsburg, under the guidance of the National Park Service.

Yorktown is directly accessible via Colonial Parkway, a two-lane, commercial vehicle-free highway that connects with Williamsburg, Jamestown, State Route 199, U.S. Route 60 and Interstate 64. The closest city, Williamsburg, is a 20-minute ride from Yorktown.

== Demographics ==
Historical population
Census	Pop.	Note	%±
2000	203		—
2010	195		−3.9%
2020	221		13.3%
U.S. Decennial Census; 1990 2000 2010

Yorktown was first listed as a census designated place in the 2000 U.S. census.

As of the 2010 U.S. census, there were 195 people living in Yorktown, down from 203 in 2000. There were 126 housing units in the CDP. The population density was 325 inhabitants per square mile (125/km^{2}). There were 126 housing units at an average density of 210 per square mile (81/km^{2}). The racial makeup of the CDP was 91.79% White, 6.67% Black or African American, 0.51% Asian, 1.03% other races.

In the CDP, the population was spread out, with 3.08% under the age of 4, 5.64% from 5 to 17, 56.41% from 18 to 64, and 34.87% above 65. There were 101 males for every 100 females.

The average income of a Yorktown resident is $42,775 a year. The Median household income of a Yorktown resident is $60,192 a year. The unemployment rate as of September 2019 was 2.7%.

Federally, Yorktown is part of Virginia's 2nd congressional district, formerly represented by Democrat Elaine Luria, elected in 2018 and currently represented by Jen Kiggans, who defeated Luria in 2022 and Democrat Missy Cotter Smasal in 2024.

== Media ==
Yorktown's daily newspaper is the Daily Press and Williamsburg-Yorktown Daily. Other papers available to residents of the county include the Port Folio Weekly, the New Journal and Guide, and the Hampton Roads Business Journal. Hampton Roads Magazine is a bi-monthly regional magazine for Yorktown and the Hampton Roads area. Hampton Roads Times serves as an online magazine for all the Hampton Roads cities and counties.

Yorktown is served by a variety of radio stations on the AM and FM dials, with towers located around the Hampton Roads area.

Yorktown is also served by several television stations. The Hampton Roads designated market area (DMA) is the 42nd-largest in the U.S. with 712,790 homes (0.64% of the total U.S.). The Public Broadcasting Service station is WHRO-TV 15. Yorktown residents can receive independent stations, such as WSKY broadcasting on channel 4 from the Outer Banks of North Carolina and WGBS-LD broadcasting on channel 11. Yorktown is served by Cox Cable which provides LNC 5, a local 24-hour cable news network. DirecTV and Dish Network are also popular as an alternative to cable television in Yorktown.

== Public transportation ==
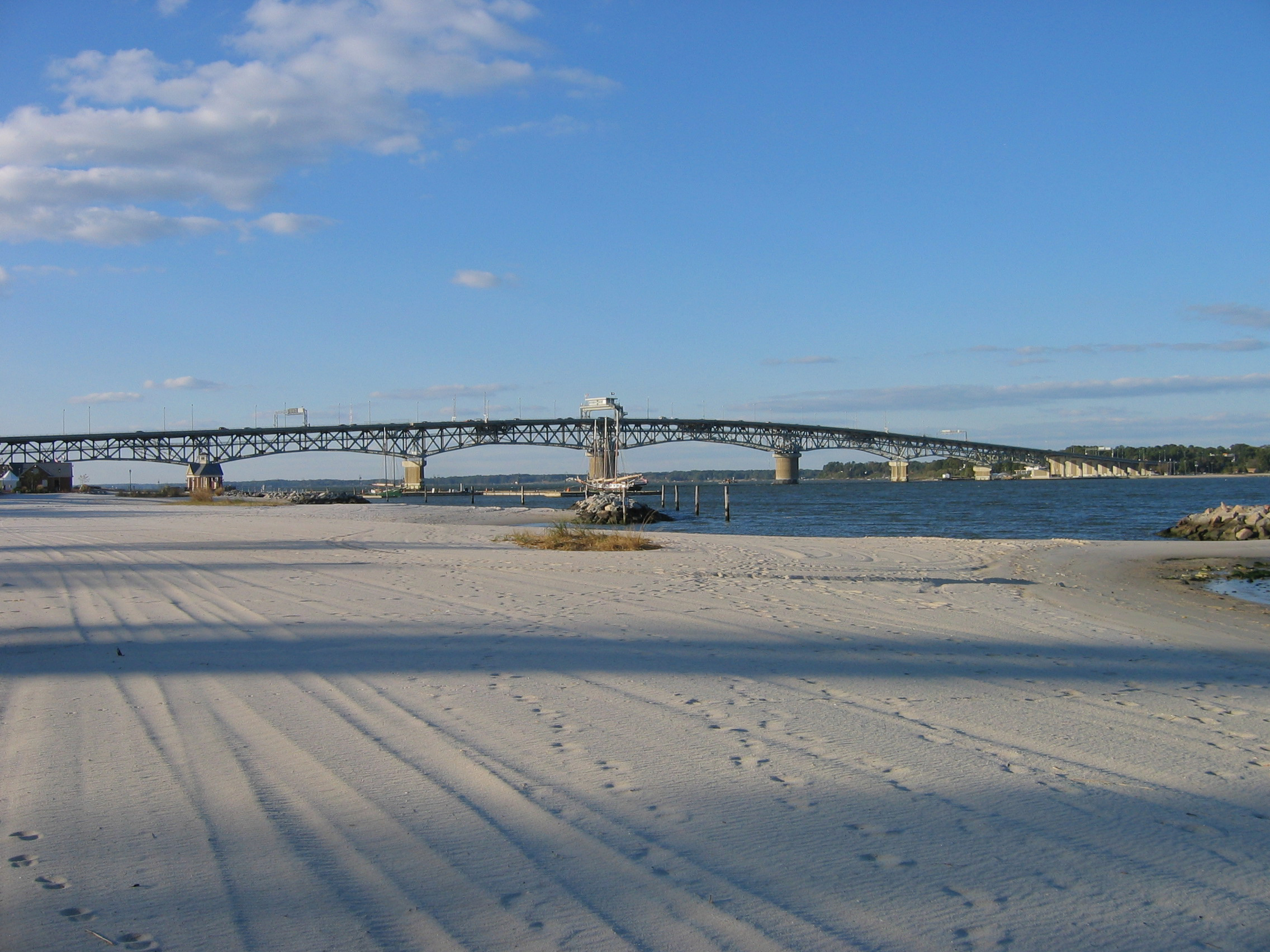
Coleman Bridge to Gloucester Point, Virginia as seen from Yorktown Beach

Williamsburg Area Transit Authority (WATA) operates a sightseeing trolley route around Yorktown on a daily basis. The loop service has been in place since 1999. However, WATA does not provide bus service between Yorktown and any other place in Hampton Roads.

Yorktown is served by commercial airports in Newport News and Norfolk, and by Amtrak stations in Newport News and Williamsburg.

== Education ==
York County Public Schools is the sole school district in the county.

The area schools, all a part of the school district's "York Zone," which are outside of the town limits but have Yorktown addresses, include Yorktown Elementary School, Yorktown Middle School, and York High School.
