= Deux-Ponts =

Deux-Ponts (French: deux ponts means two bridges) may refer to:

- French name for Zweibrücken, a city in Germany (predominant use)
- Régiment de Royal Deux-Ponts, a German-French infantry regiment, predecessor of the 99e régiment d'infanterie de ligne
- Breguet Deux-Ponts, a family of 1940s and 1950s French double-deck transport aircraft produced by Breguet
- members of the house von Forbach, later von Zweibrücken:
  - Christian Marquis de Deux-Ponts (1752–1817), officer of the French army and later general of the Royal Prussian and then of the Bavarian Army
  - Philippe Guillaume Vicomte de Deux-Ponts (1754–1807), officer of the French army and later general of the Bavarian Army
