= Forbach (disambiguation) =

Forbach is a commune in the Moselle department in Lorraine in northeastern France.

Forbach may also refer to:

- Gare de Forbach, railway station of Forbach
- US Forbach, football club of Forbach
- Canton of Forbach
- Arrondissement of Forbach, former arrondissement
- Battle of Spicheren, also known as Battle of Forbach, on 6 August 1870 during the Franco-Prussian War
- Forbach (Baden), a town in south-western Germany
- the former German name of Polska Wieś, a town in Gmina Pobiedziska, Poznań County, within Greater Poland Voivodeship, in west-central Poland
- Forbach (Usa), a river in Hesse, Germany, tributary of the Usa
- Forbach Granite, a type of rock
- Jason Forbach, American actor, singer, playwright and filmmaker
- Christian von Zweibrücken (1752–1817), Marquis de Deux-Ponts & Freiherr von Zweibrücken, officer of the French army, Prussian & Bavarian General der Infanterie
- Christian von Zweibrücken (1782–1859), later Graf von Zweibrücken, (1782–1859), Bavarian General der Kavallerie
- Wilhelm of the Palatinate-Zweibrücken, also known as Philipp Wilhelm Graf von Forbach (1754–1807), officer of the French and later general of the Bavarian Army
