= Christian of the Palatinate-Zweibrücken =

Christian of the Palatinate-Zweibrücken may refer to:

- Christian of the Palatinate-Zweibrücken (1752–1817), Bavarian General of the Infantry
- Christian of the Palatinate-Zweibrücken (1782–1859), Bavarian General of the Cavalry
