= Christian Graf von Forbach =

Christian Graf von Forbach may refer to:

- Christian of the Palatinate-Zweibrücken (1752–1817)
- Christian of the Palatinate-Zweibrücken (1782–1859)
