= Christian von Zweibrücken =

Christian von Zweibrücken may refer to:

- Christian von Zweibrücken (1752–1817), Marquis de Deux-Ponts & Freiherr von Zweibrücken, officer of the French army, Prussian & Bavarian General der Infanterie
- Christian von Zweibrücken (1782–1859), later Graf von Zweibrücken, (1782–1859), Bavarian General der Kavallerie
