= Siege of Genoa (1800) order of battle =

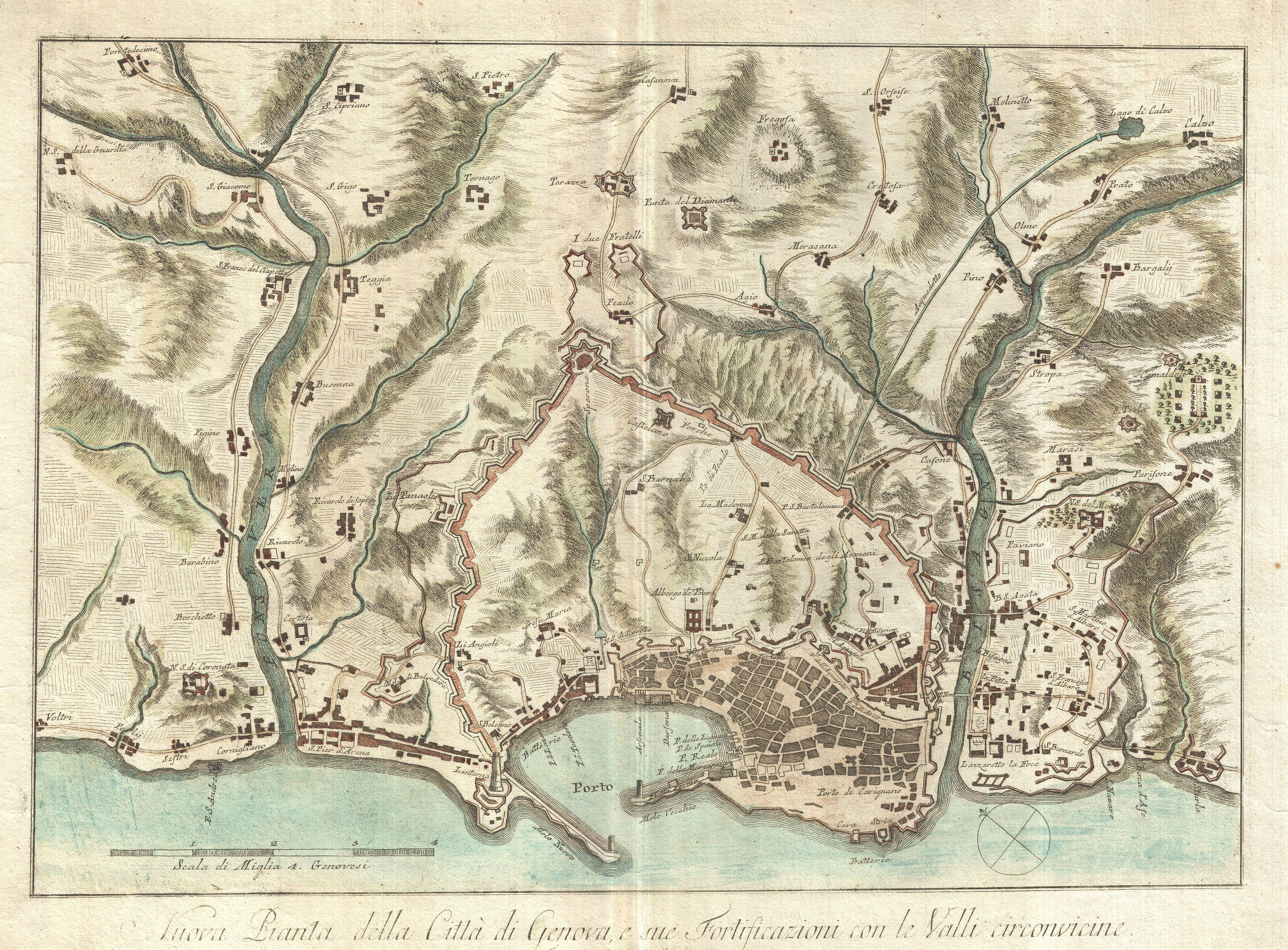
Map shows the fortifications of the 1800 Siege of Genoa.

The following units fought in the Siege of Genoa (6 April – 4 June 1800) during the War of the Second Coalition. The first order of battle shows the French Army of Italy at the beginning of the campaign. The second order of battle shows the Austrian forces during the siege. The third order of battle shows the British Royal Navy squadron assisting the siege. The fourth order of battle shows the French forces at the end of the siege.

== Key ==
=== Military rank ===
- GD = French General of Division or division commander
- GB = French General of Brigade or brigade commander
- FML = Austrian Feldmarschall-Leutnant or division commander
- GM = Austrian Generalmajor or brigade commander
- OB = Austrian Oberst or regimental commander

=== Other ===
- w&c = wounded and captured
- Nr. = Number

== Orders of battle ==
=== French Army of Italy ===
GD André Massena, commander

List of French Army of Italy units on 5 April 1800
Corps	Divisions	Units	Strength
GD Jean-de-Dieu Soult (w&c); 19,790	GD Sextius Miollis	5th Light Infantry Demi-Brigade	600
GD Jean-de-Dieu Soult (w&c); 19,790	GD Sextius Miollis	24th Line Infantry Demi-Brigade	800
GD Jean-de-Dieu Soult (w&c); 19,790	GD Sextius Miollis	74th Line Infantry Demi-Brigade	1,100
GD Jean-de-Dieu Soult (w&c); 19,790	GD Sextius Miollis	106th Line Infantry Demi-Brigade	1,700
GD Jean-de-Dieu Soult (w&c); 19,790	GD Honoré Gazan	Piedmont Grenadiers	90
GD Jean-de-Dieu Soult (w&c); 19,790	GD Honoré Gazan	30th Light Infantry Demi-Brigade	500
GD Jean-de-Dieu Soult (w&c); 19,790	GD Honoré Gazan	2nd Line Infantry Demi-Brigade	1,600
GD Jean-de-Dieu Soult (w&c); 19,790	GD Honoré Gazan	3rd Line Infantry Demi-Brigade	1,300
GD Jean-de-Dieu Soult (w&c); 19,790	GD Honoré Gazan	78th Line Infantry Demi-Brigade	1,300
GD Jean-de-Dieu Soult (w&c); 19,790	GD Jean-Antoine Marbot; Died 19 April 1800.	3rd Light Infantry Demi-Brigade	900
GD Jean-de-Dieu Soult (w&c); 19,790	GD Jean-Antoine Marbot; Died 19 April 1800.	62nd Line Infantry Demi-Brigade	1,500
GD Jean-de-Dieu Soult (w&c); 19,790	GD Jean-Antoine Marbot; Died 19 April 1800.	63rd Line Infantry Demi-Brigade	500
GD Jean-de-Dieu Soult (w&c); 19,790	GD Jean-Antoine Marbot; Died 19 April 1800.	97th Line Infantry Demi-Brigade	1,300
GD Jean-de-Dieu Soult (w&c); 19,790	Reserve	25th Light Infantry Demi-Brigade	1,700
GD Jean-de-Dieu Soult (w&c); 19,790	Reserve	92nd Line Infantry Demi-Brigade	500
GD Jean-de-Dieu Soult (w&c); 19,790	Genoa Garrison	2nd Polish Legion	1,200
GD Jean-de-Dieu Soult (w&c); 19,790	Genoa Garrison	41st Line Infantry Demi-Brigade	3,000
GD Jean-de-Dieu Soult (w&c); 19,790	Genoa Garrison	73rd Line Infantry Demi-Brigade	3,000
GD Jean-de-Dieu Soult (w&c); 19,790	Genoa Garrison	93rd Line Infantry Demi-Brigade	3,000
GD Louis-Gabriel Suchet; 15,607	GD Bertrand Clausel	20th Light Infantry Demi-Brigade	853
GD Louis-Gabriel Suchet; 15,607	GD Bertrand Clausel	10th Line Infantry Demi-Brigade	1,409
GD Louis-Gabriel Suchet; 15,607	GD Bertrand Clausel	34th Line Infantry Demi-Brigade	1,122
GD Louis-Gabriel Suchet; 15,607	GD Bertrand Clausel	87th Line Infantry Demi-Brigade	460
GD Louis-Gabriel Suchet; 15,607	GD Jean Pierre Pouget	7th Light Infantry Demi-Brigade	965
GD Louis-Gabriel Suchet; 15,607	GD Jean Pierre Pouget	11th Line Infantry Demi-Brigade	454
GD Louis-Gabriel Suchet; 15,607	GD Jean Pierre Pouget	99th Line Infantry Demi-Brigade	1,352
GD Louis-Gabriel Suchet; 15,607	GD Pierre Garnier	33rd Line Infantry Demi-Brigade	487
GD Louis-Gabriel Suchet; 15,607	GD Pierre Garnier	39th Line Infantry Demi-Brigade	422
GD Louis-Gabriel Suchet; 15,607	GD Pierre Garnier	55th Line Infantry Demi-Brigade	213
GD Louis-Gabriel Suchet; 15,607	GD Pierre Garnier	68th Line Infantry Demi-Brigade	620
GD Louis-Gabriel Suchet; 15,607	GD Pierre Garnier	104th Line Infantry Demi-Brigade	1,050
GD Louis-Gabriel Suchet; 15,607	GD Philippe Roman; Ménard	16th Light Infantry Demi-Brigade	800
GD Louis-Gabriel Suchet; 15,607	GD Philippe Roman; Ménard	30th Line Infantry Demi-Brigade	1,200
GD Louis-Gabriel Suchet; 15,607	GD Philippe Roman; Ménard	105th Line Infantry Demi-Brigade	1,400
GD Louis-Gabriel Suchet; 15,607	GD Philippe Roman; Ménard	1st Polish Legion	800
GD Louis-Gabriel Suchet; 15,607	Garrisons	17th Light Infantry Demi-Brigade	?
GD Louis-Gabriel Suchet; 15,607	Garrisons	14th Line Infantry Demi-Brigade	?
Corps of the Alps; 8,000	GD Louis Turreau	15th & 28th Light Infantry Demi-Brigades	8,000
Corps of the Alps; 8,000	GD Louis Turreau	12th & 21st Line Infantry Demi-Brigades	8,000
Corps of the Alps; 8,000	GD Louis Turreau	26th & 80th Line Infantry Demi-Brigades	8,000
Corps of the Alps; 8,000	GD Louis Turreau	88th & 107th Line Infantry Demi-Brigades	8,000
Corps of the Alps; 8,000	GD Louis Turreau	Piedmontese Patriot Battalion	8,000
Antibes Garrison	GD Jean-Charles Monnier	8th Light Infantry Demi-Brigade	?
Antibes Garrison	GD Jean-Charles Monnier	16th Light Infantry Demi-Brigade	?
Antibes Garrison	GD Jean-Charles Monnier	1st Roman Legion	1,200

=== Austrian order of battle ===
FML Peter Karl Ott von Bátorkéz, siege commander

- These subordinate officers served during the siege. This list is not comprehensive.

- FML Ludwig von Vogelsang
- GM Friedrich Heinrich von Gottesheim
- OB Johann Maria Philipp Frimont

List of Austrian units at the Siege of Genoa
Units	Battalions
Reisky Infantry Regiment Nr. 13	3
Klebek Infantry Regiment Nr. 14	3
Terzy Infantry Regiment Nr. 16	3
Stuart Infantry Regiment Nr. 18	3
Alvinczi Infantry Regiment Nr. 19	3
Kray Infantry Regiment Nr. 34	3
Nádasdy Infantry Regiment Nr. 39	3
Splényi Infantry Regiment Nr. 51	3
Jellacic Infantry Regiment Nr. 53	1
Archduke Joseph Infantry Regiment Nr. 55	3
Joseph Colloredo Infantry Regiment Nr. 57	3
Jordis Infantry Regiment Nr. 59	3
vacant Infantry Regiment Nr. 61	1
Oguliner Grenz Infantry Regiment Nr. 3	2
Warasdiner-Creutzer Grenz Infantry Regiment Nr. 5	2
2nd Banal Grenz Infantry Regiment Nr. 11	1
Bach Light Battalion Nr. 3	1
Am Ende Light Battalion Nr. 4	1
Schmelzern Light Battalion Nr. 7	1
Mihanovic Light Battalion Nr. 15	1
Bussy Jägers zu Pferde	Number of squadrons not given.
vacant Hussar Regiment Nr. 5	Number of squadrons not given.
Nauendorf Hussar Regiment Nr. 8	Number of squadrons not given.

=== British squadron ===
Vice-Admiral George Elphinstone, 1st Viscount Keith

List of British Royal Navy ships at the Siege of Genoa
Ships	Guns
HMS Minotaur	74
HMS Phoenix	36
HMS Mondovi	16
HMS Entreprenante	10
Victoire, tender	-
HMS Phaeton	38

=== French order of battle ===
GD André Massena, siege commander

List of French units at the end of the Siege of Genoa
Divisions	Units
1st Division; GD Sextius Miollis; 4,500	3rd Light Infantry Demi-Brigade
1st Division; GD Sextius Miollis; 4,500	8th Light Infantry Demi-Brigade
1st Division; GD Sextius Miollis; 4,500	21st Line Infantry Demi-Brigade
1st Division; GD Sextius Miollis; 4,500	22nd Line Infantry Demi-Brigade
1st Division; GD Sextius Miollis; 4,500	63rd Line Infantry Demi-Brigade
1st Division; GD Sextius Miollis; 4,500	74th Line Infantry Demi-Brigade
1st Division; GD Sextius Miollis; 4,500	78th Line Infantry Demi-Brigade
2nd Division; GD Honoré Gazan; 3,500	5th Light Infantry Demi-Brigade
2nd Division; GD Honoré Gazan; 3,500	25th Light Infantry Demi-Brigade
2nd Division; GD Honoré Gazan; 3,500	44th Line Infantry Demi-Brigade
2nd Division; GD Honoré Gazan; 3,500	55th Line Infantry Demi-Brigade
2nd Division; GD Honoré Gazan; 3,500	92nd Line Infantry Demi-Brigade
2nd Division; GD Honoré Gazan; 3,500	97th Line Infantry Demi-Brigade
2nd Division; GD Honoré Gazan; 3,500	106th Line Infantry Demi-Brigade
3rd Division; GB Pierre Poinsot; 1,600	2nd Line Infantry Demi-Brigade
3rd Division; GB Pierre Poinsot; 1,600	3rd Line Infantry Demi-Brigade

== See also ==
- List of orders of battle
