= Maximilian von Verri della Bosia =

Bavarian general (1824–1909)

Maximilian Graf von Verri della Bosia genannt von Külberg auf Gansheim und Berg (1824 –1909) was a Bavarian general.

== Biography ==
Von Verri della Bosia was a member of an aristocrat family, which came originally from Alba, Italy. The family was ennobled by Victor Amadeus II of Sardinia in 1724. After his grandfather Josef Ascan Graf Verri della Bosia (1756–1828) moved from Alba to Bavaria, the title was recognized by the Bavarian king Maximilian I. in 1816. Maximilian's father was the Bavarian general Ascan Karl Graf Verri della Bosia (1790–1878).

In the rank of Lieutenant General he was Generalquartiermeister and inspector of military training institutions from 1883 to 1888, and later Generalkapitän of the Leibgarde der Hartschiere.
