= Oskar J. W. Hansen =

American sculptor

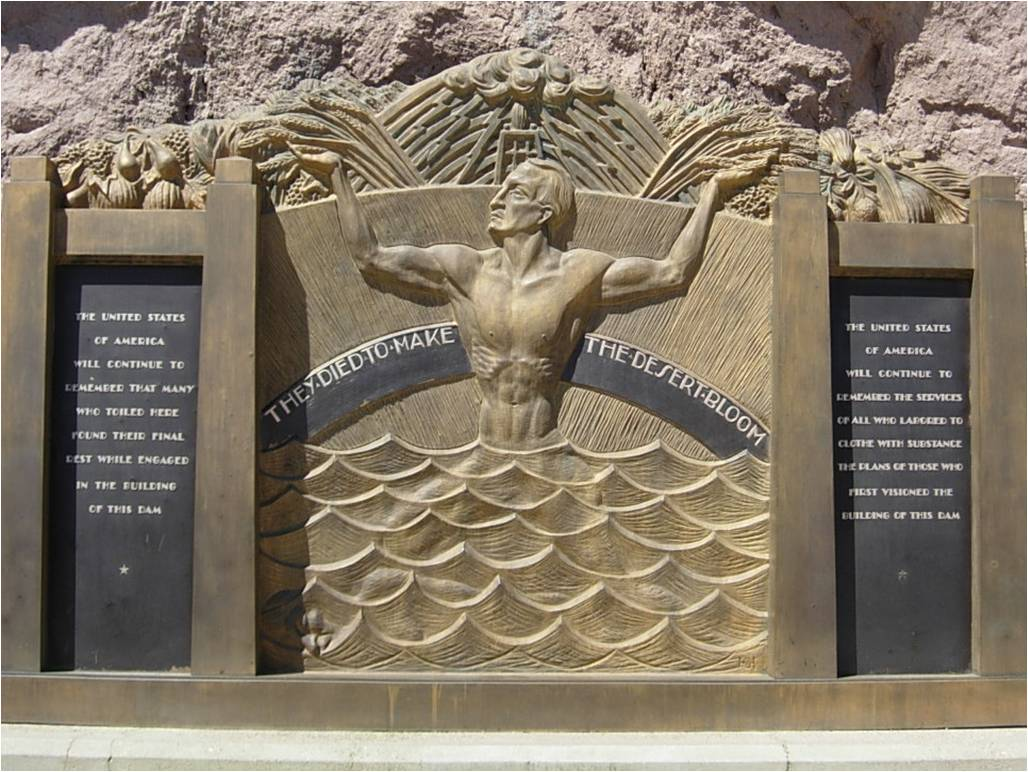
Memorial at Hoover Dam, commemorating 112 deaths during its construction. Inscription: They died to make the desert bloom

Oskar J. W. Hansen (March 12, 1892 – August 31, 1971) was a Norwegian-born, naturalized American sculptor. He is most associated with the design of many of the sculptures on and around the Hoover Dam, most notably Winged Figures of the Republic.

== Biography ==
Oskar Johan Waldemar Hansen was born in the parish of Langenes in Øksnes Municipality, Nordland, Norway. Before coming to America, he served as a merchant seaman. He later served in the United States Army. In the late 1930s or early 1940s, Hansen built a home and artist's studio on property near Ashcroft outside Charlottesville, Virginia.

== Selected works ==
- Winged Figures of the Republic - among numerous examples of his sculpture in Art Deco mode commissioned by the US Bureau of Reclamation, executed under the Los Angeles-based architect Gordon B. Kaufmann, supervising architect to the Bureau at Hoover Dam.
- Wings - installed in the lobby of the Rand Tower, Minneapolis, completed in 1929.
- Liberty - installed in 1957 atop a column replaced one that had been struck by lightning in 1942 at the Yorktown, Virginia, Victory Monument, commemorating the 1781 victory at Yorktown and the alliance with France that brought about the end of the American Revolution and the resulting peace with England.

== Gallery ==
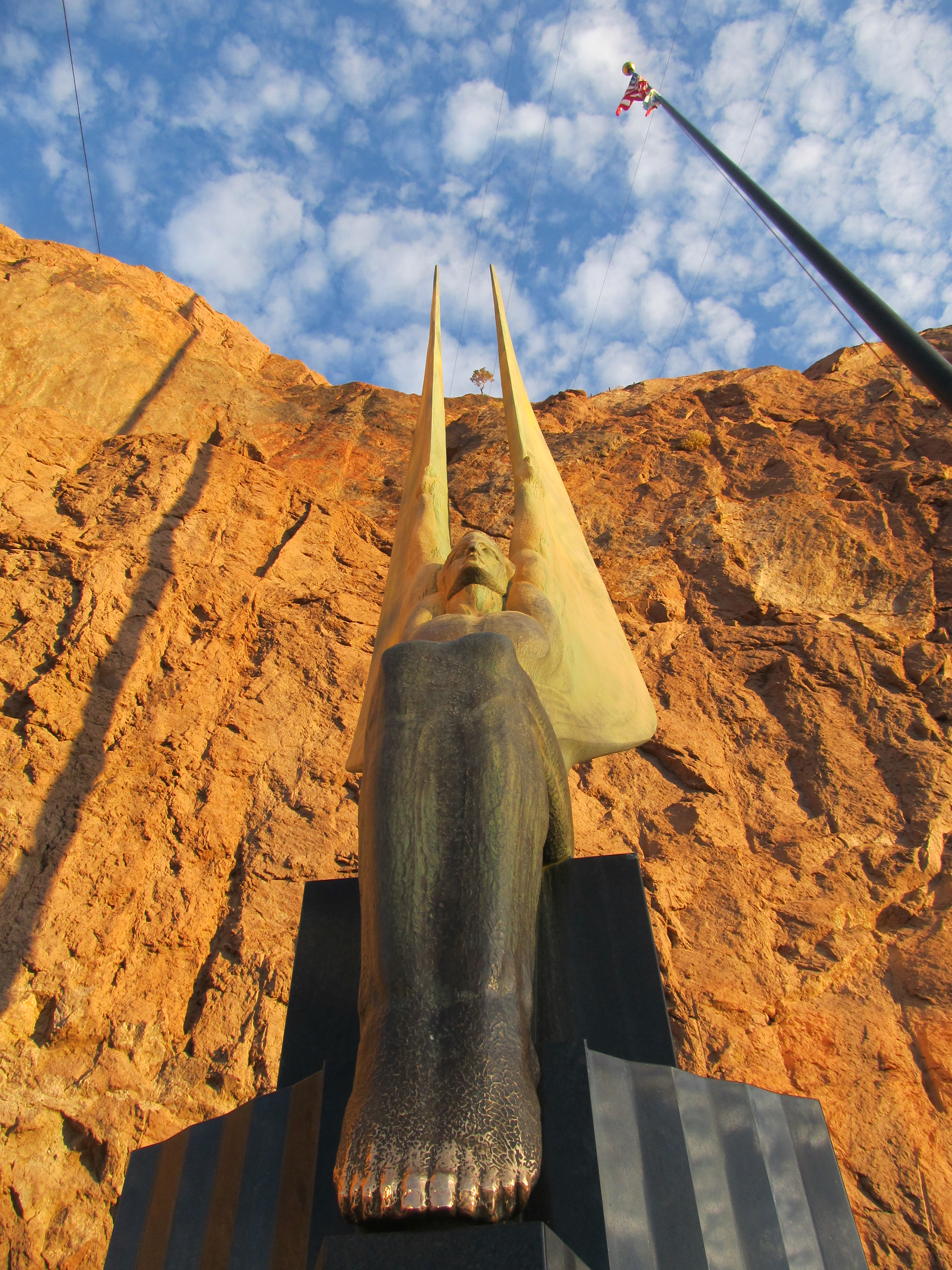
Winged Figures of the Republic - Nevada side of Hoover Dam

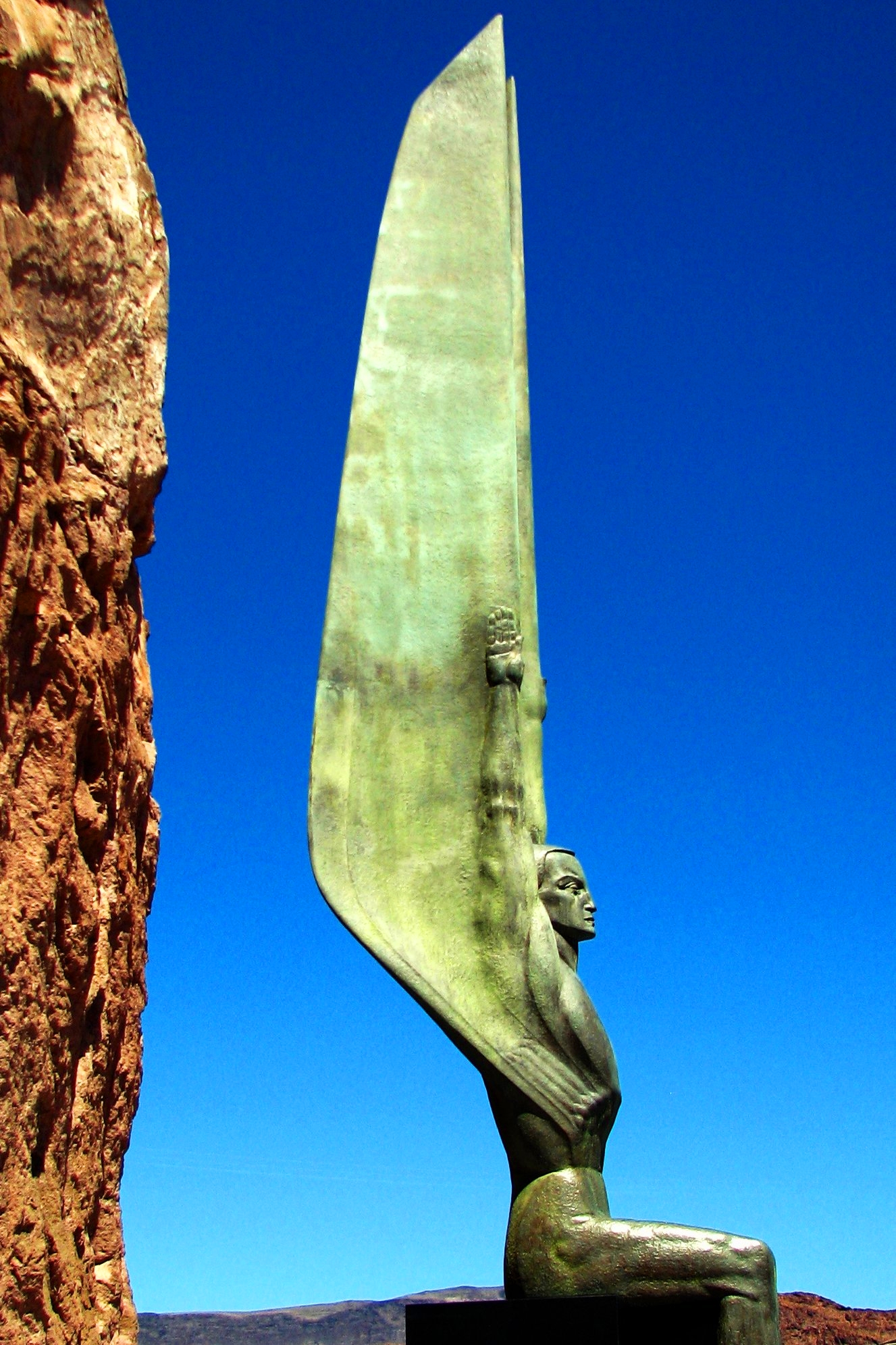
Winged Figures of the Republic - Nevada side of Hoover Dam

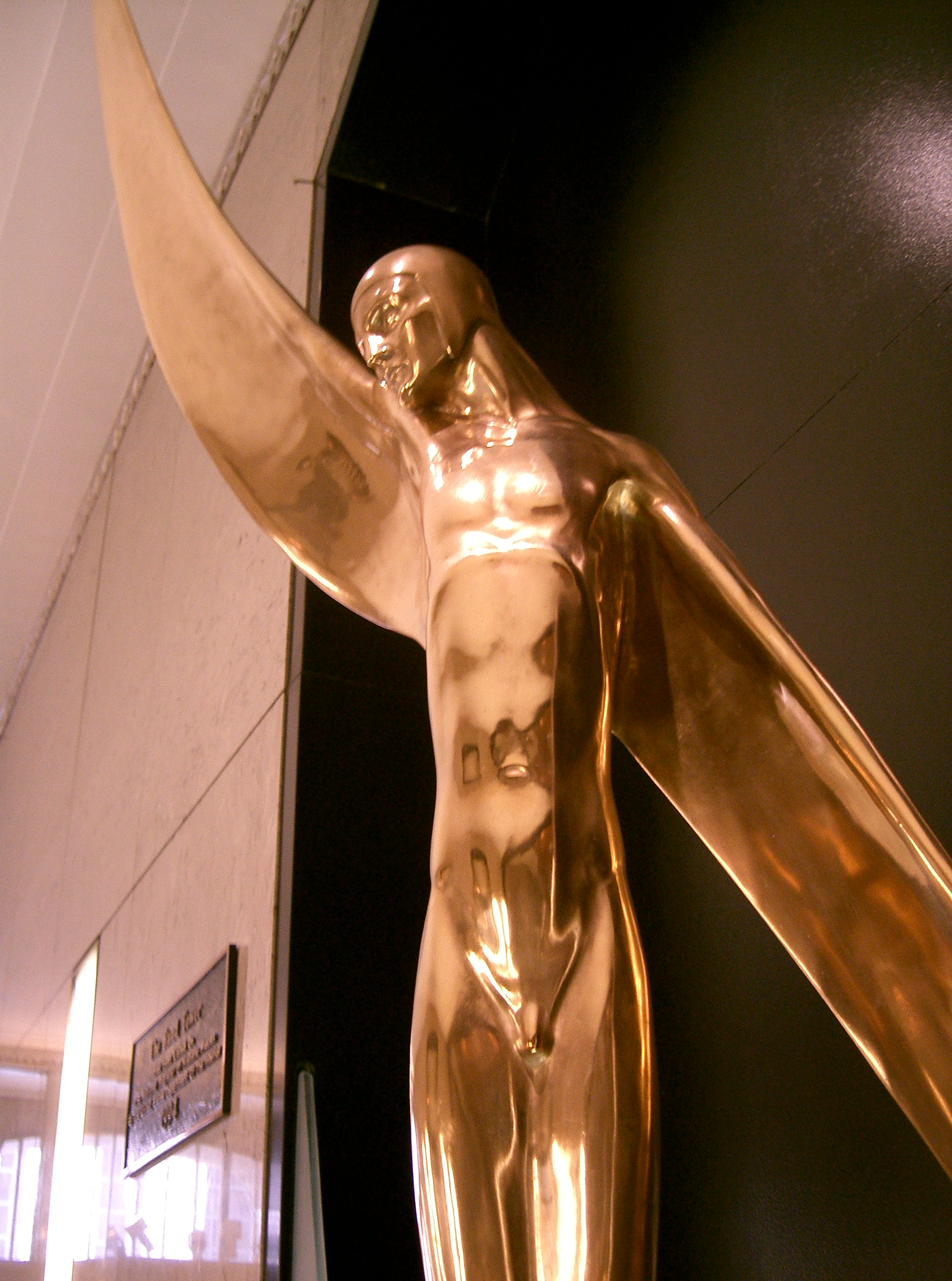
Wings - main lobby of the Rand Tower in Minneapolis, MN

== Related Writings ==
- Beyond the Cherubim (1964)
- Sculptures at Hoover Dam (1960)

== Related Reading ==
- Hiltzik, Michael (2010) Colossus: Hoover Dam and the Making of the American Century (New York: Simon and Schuster) ISBN 9781439181584
