= Yorktown Victory Monument =

Monument in Yorktown, Virginia, U.S.

- United States
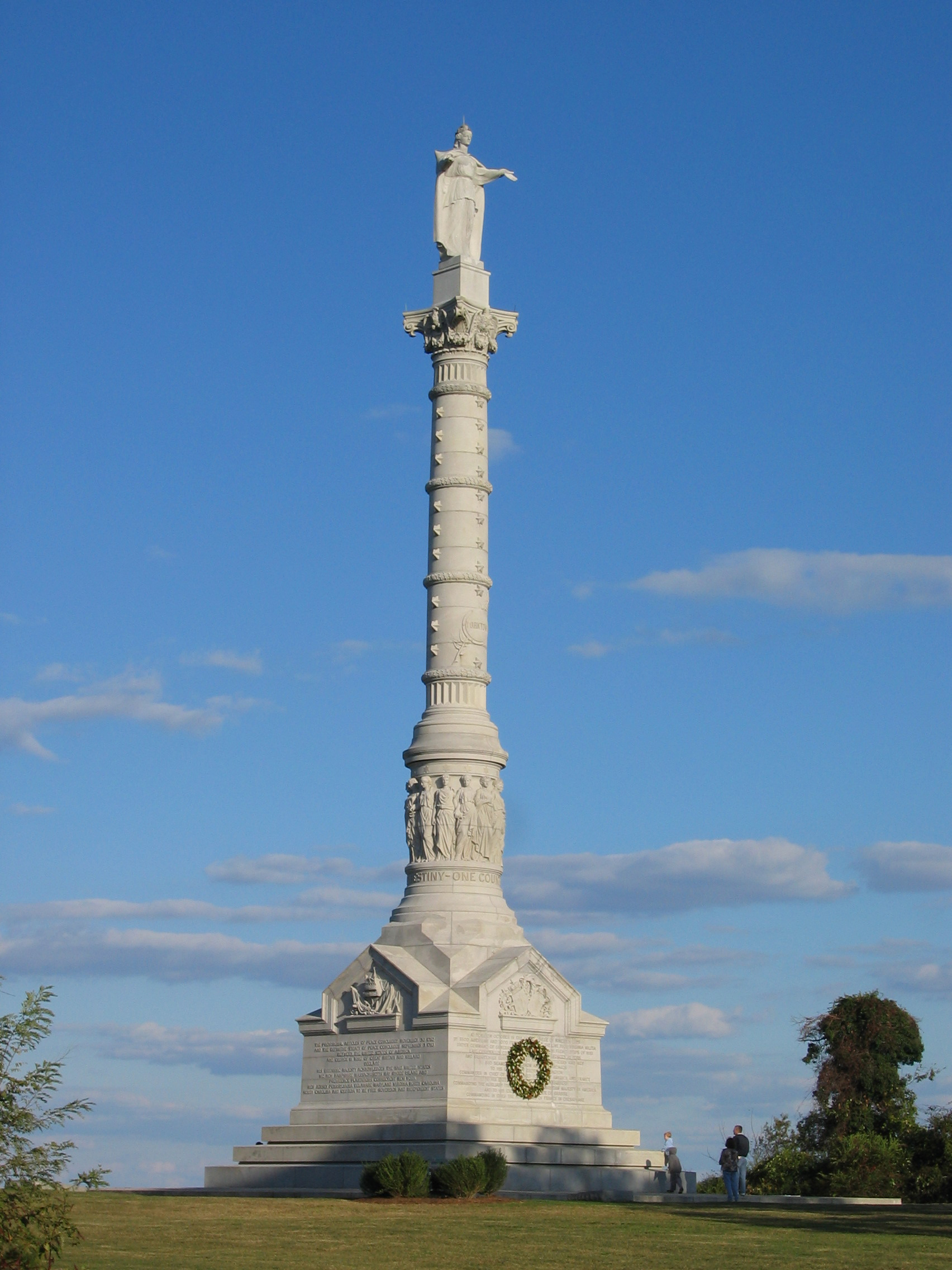
- The monument in Colonial National Historical Park was erected in 1884.
- For Victory over the British at the Battle of Yorktown in 1781 during the Revolutionary War.
- Unveiled: October 10, 1884
- Location: 37°14′00″N 76°30′17″W; Colonial National Historical Park, Yorktown, Virginia
- Designed by: Richard Morris Hunt

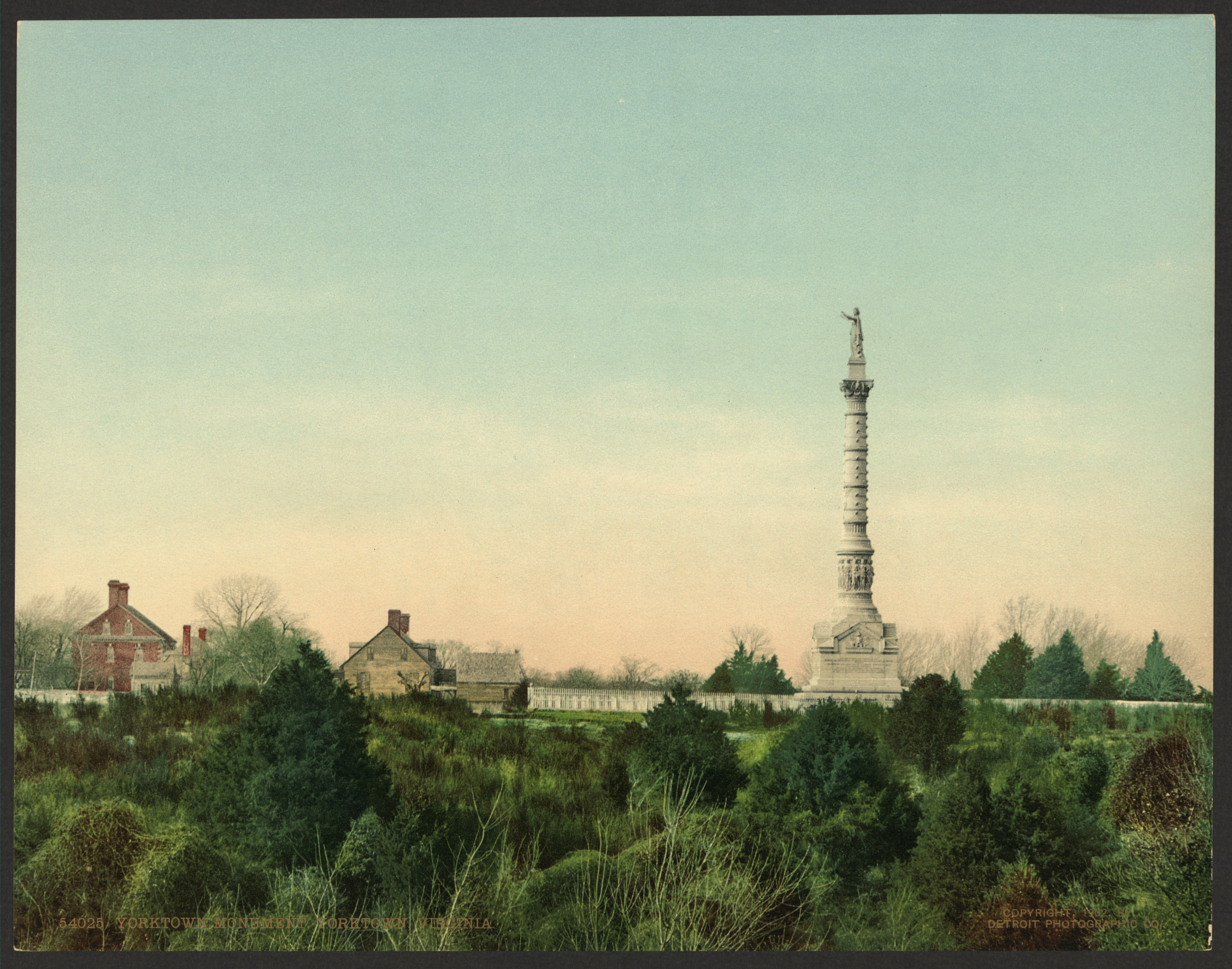
1902 photomechanical print of the monument.

The Yorktown Victory Monument is a monument erected in Colonial National Historical Park in Yorktown, Virginia, commemorating the 1781 victory at Yorktown and the alliance with France that brought about the end of the American Revolution and the resulting peace with England after the American Revolutionary War. Designed by Richard Morris Hunt, the monument was installed in 1884. At the top stands a figure of Liberty sculpted by John Quincy Adams Ward. That element was destroyed by lightning in 1942. It was replaced in 1957 by a figure of Victory by Oskar J. W. Hansen.

== Overview ==
On October 29, 1781, the Continental Congress authorized the creation of the monument, although it would not be until another 100 years when it was finally built.

== Gallery ==
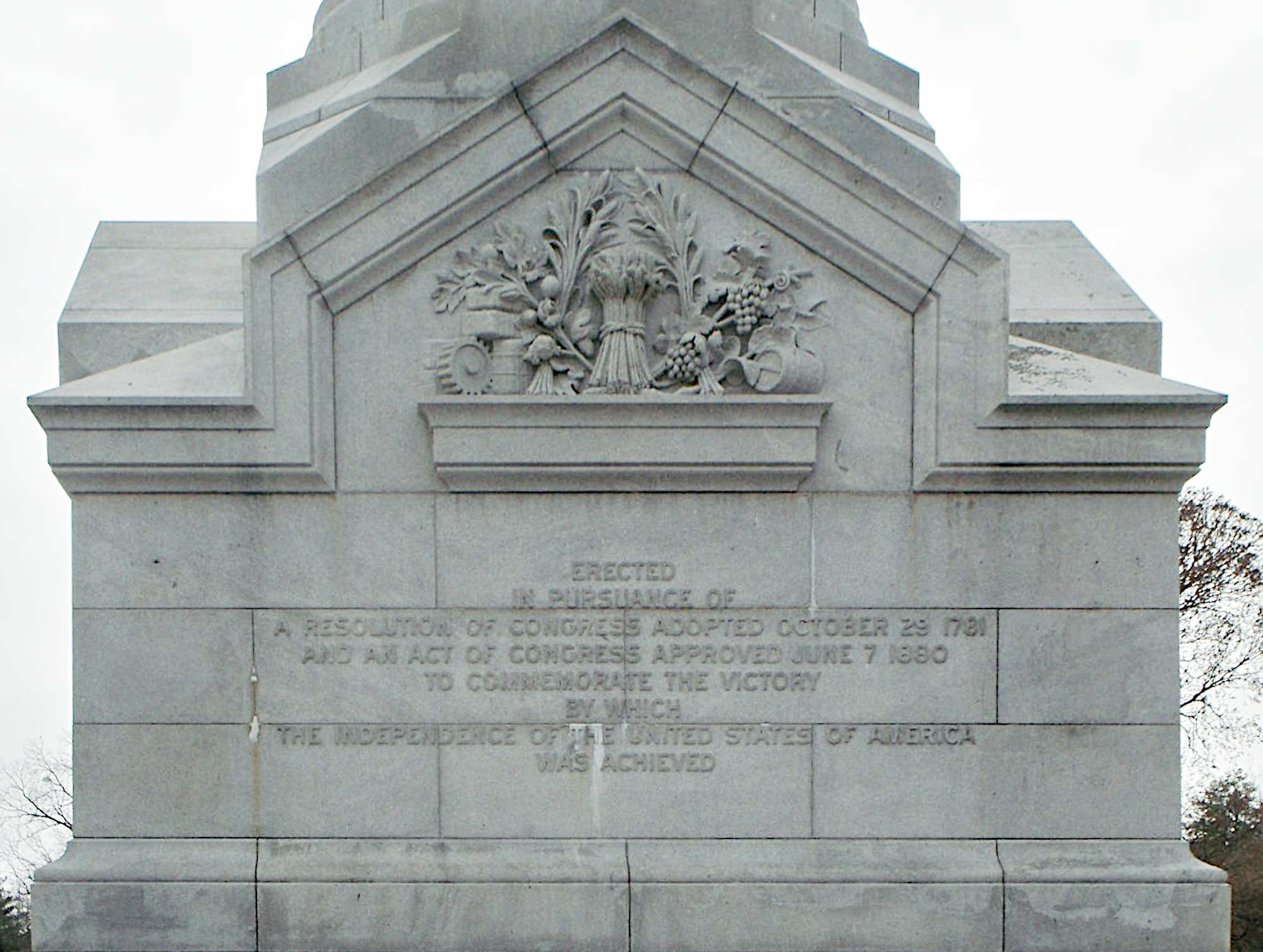

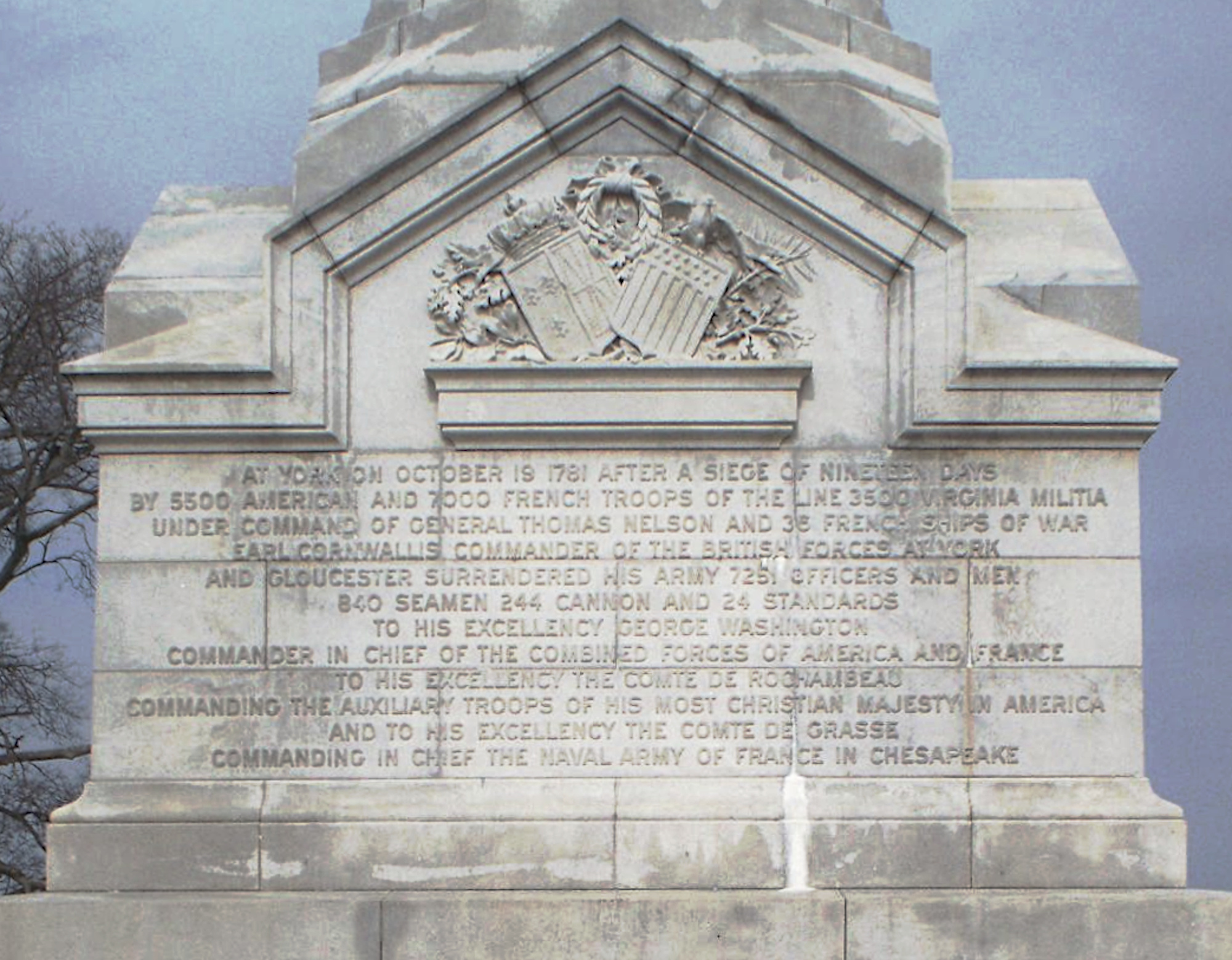

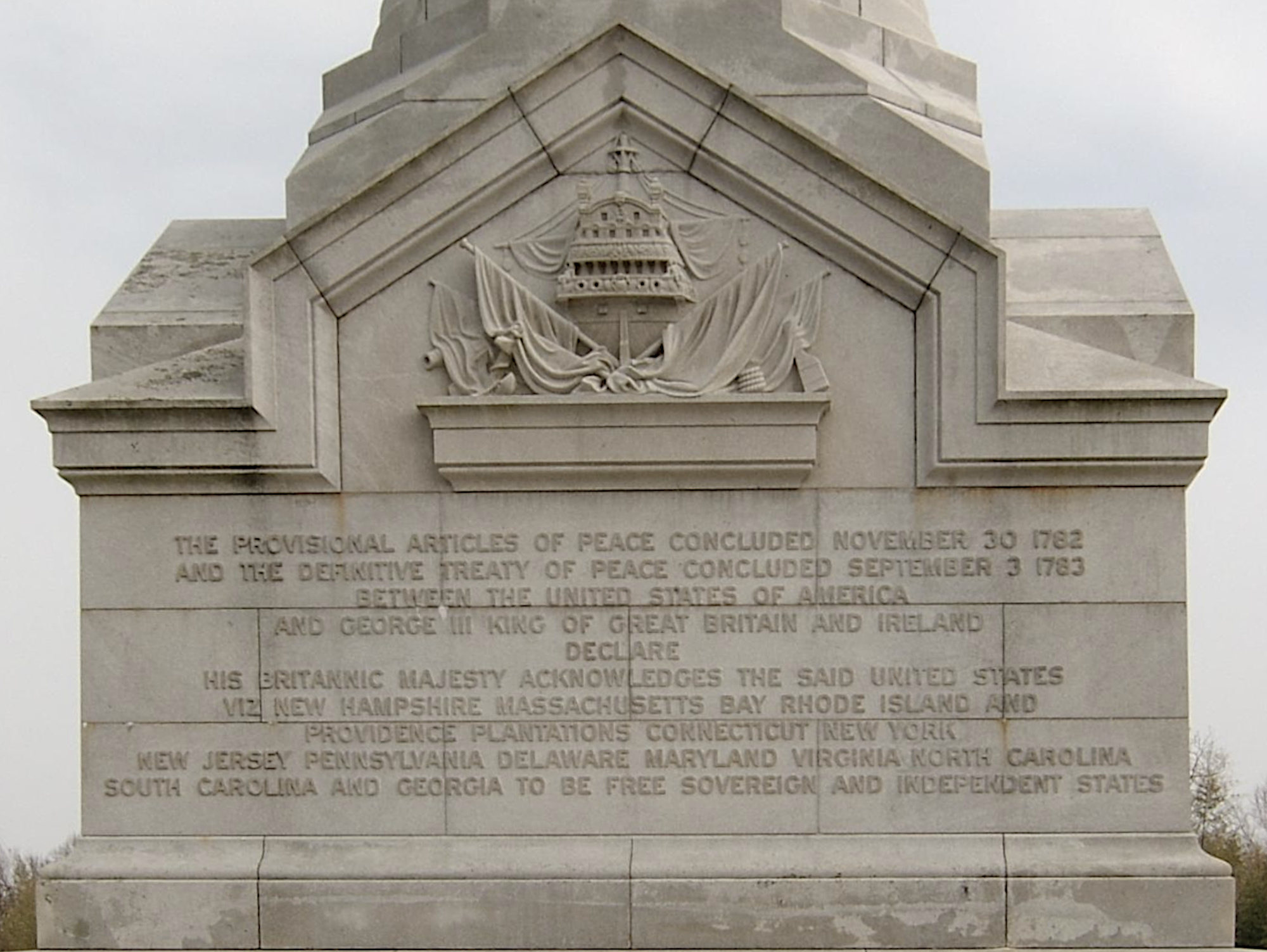

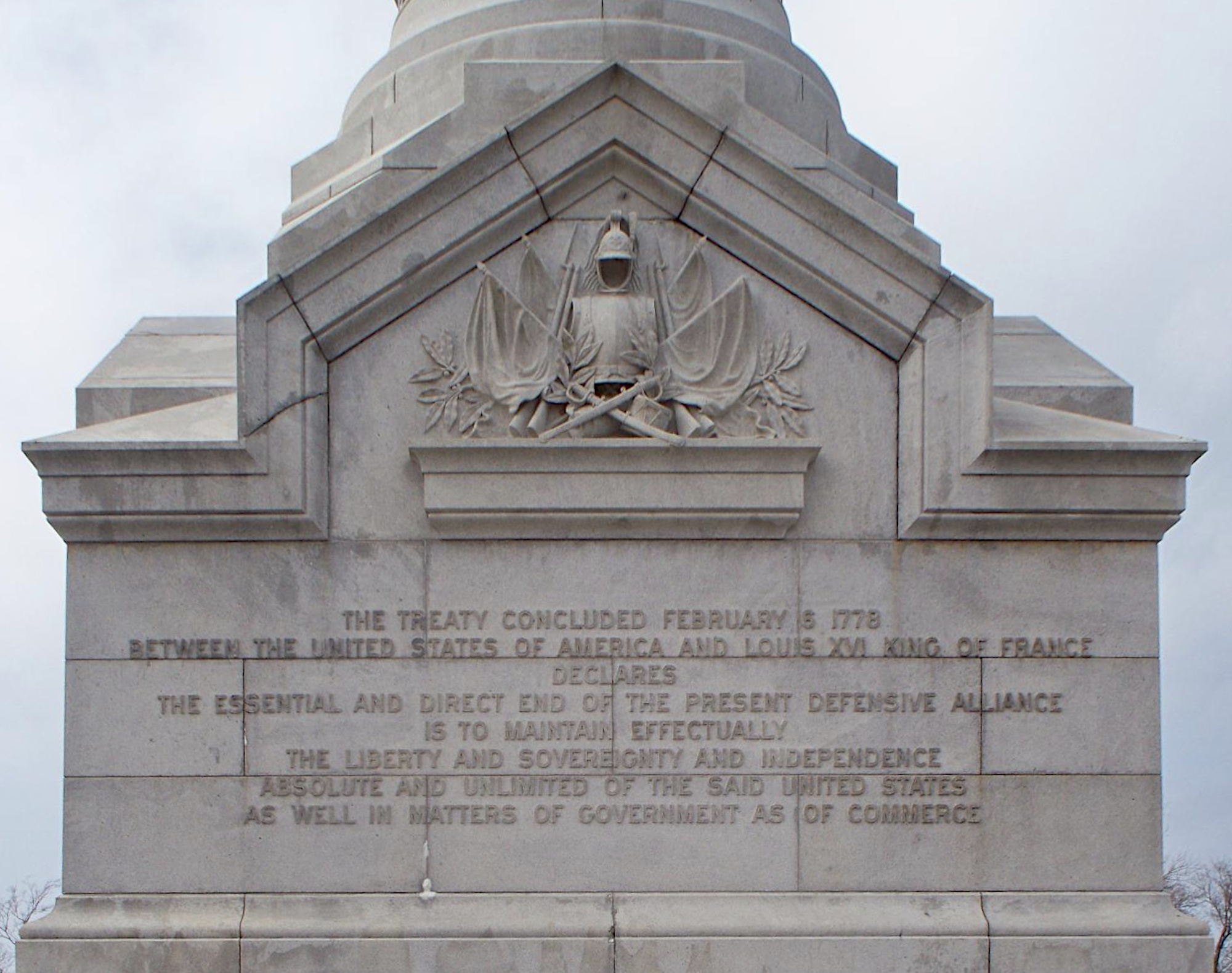

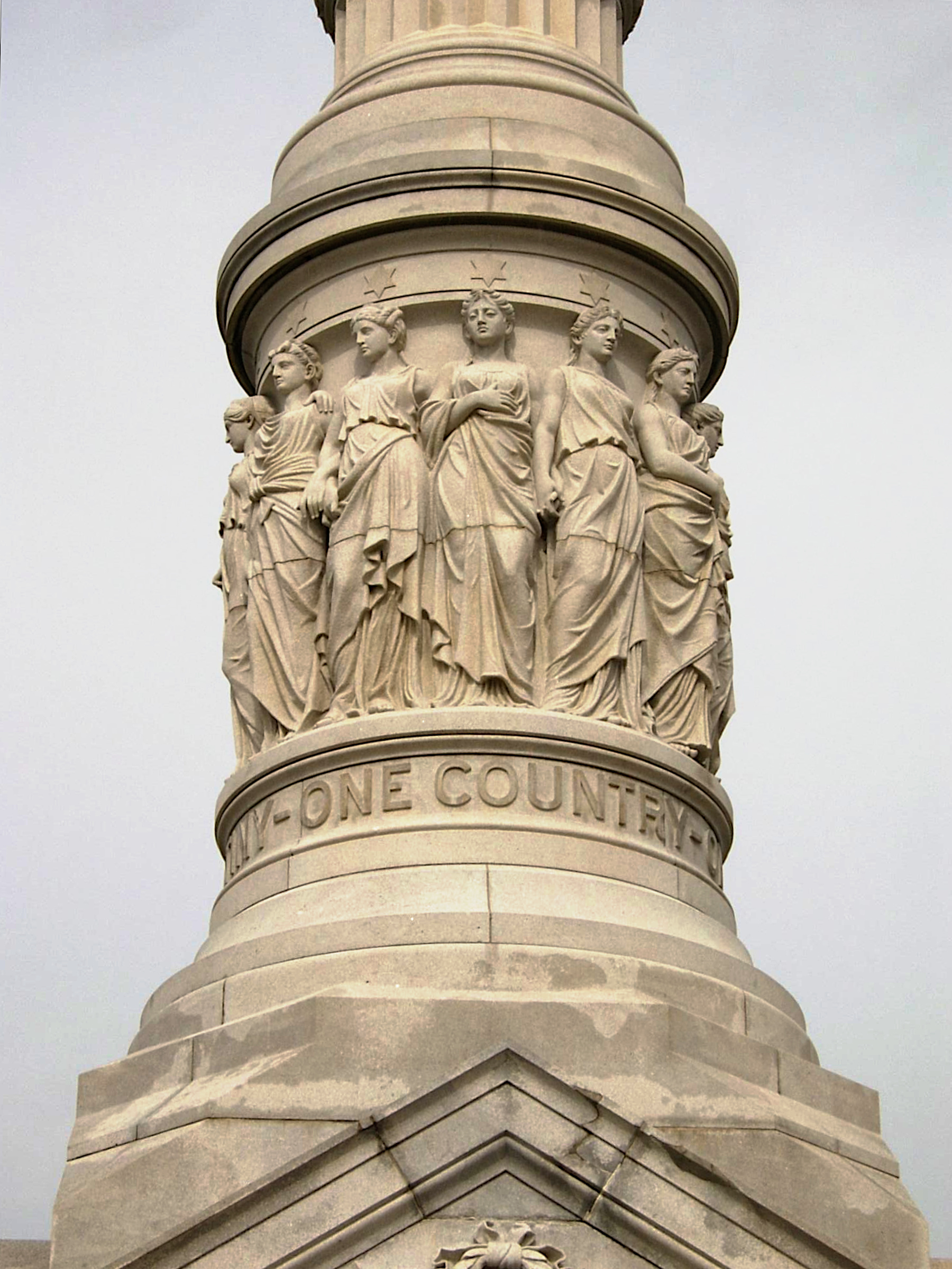

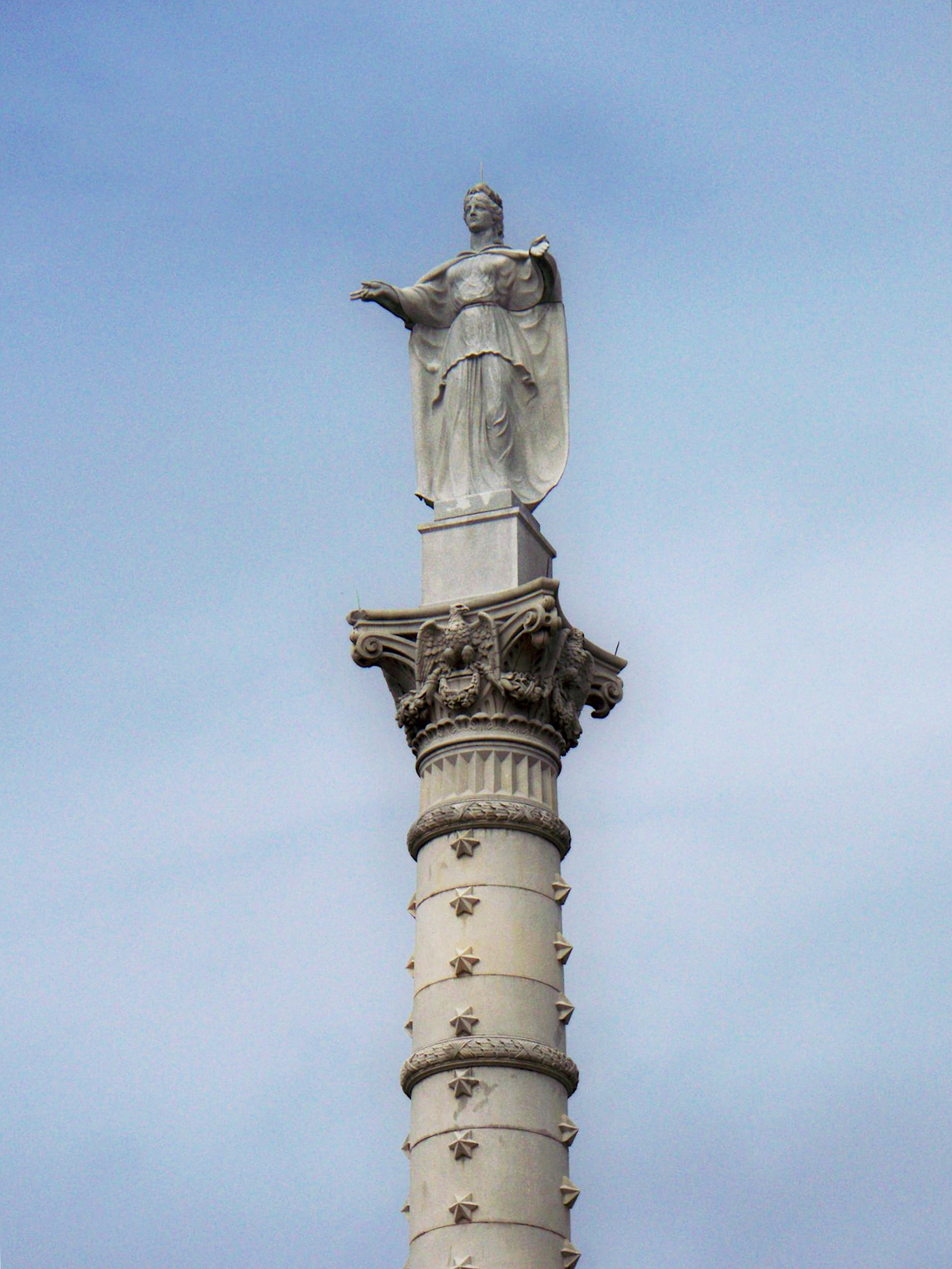

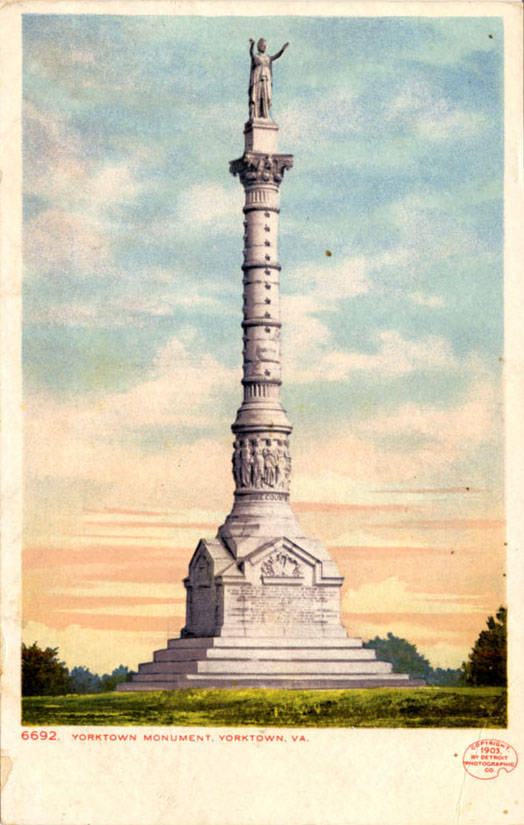

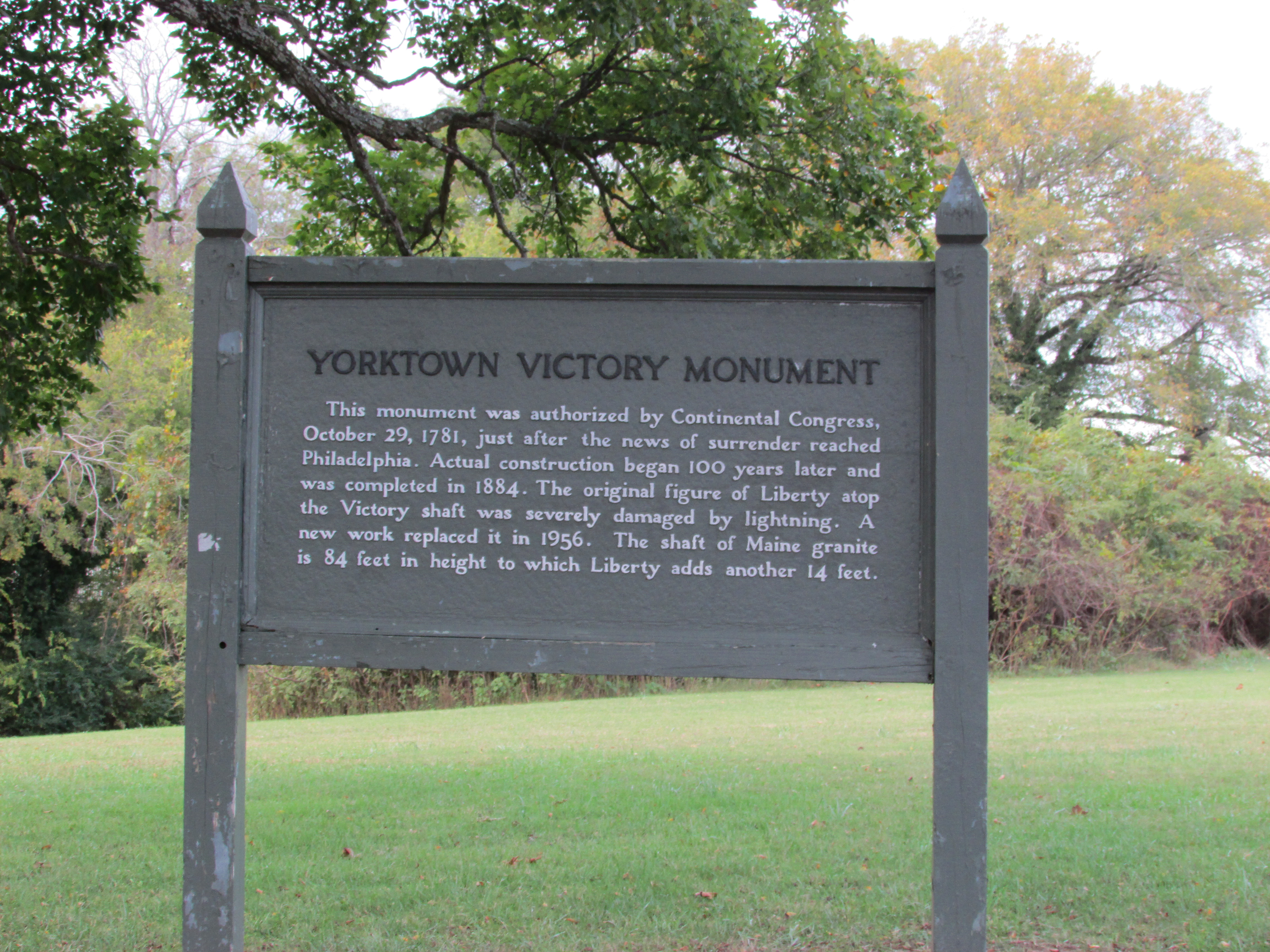

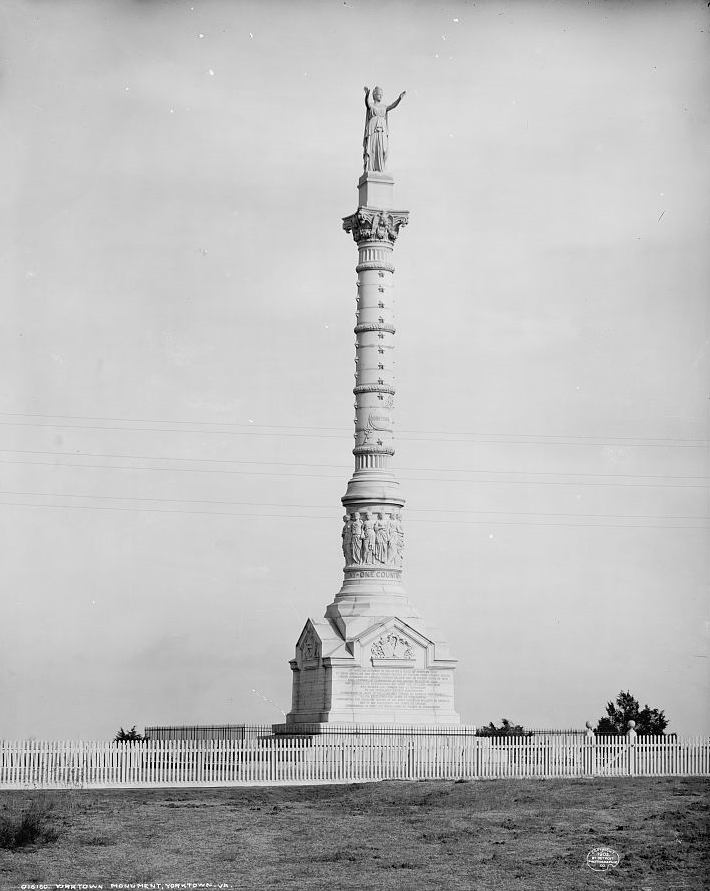
