= Christian IV, Count Palatine of Zweibrücken =

Christian IV
- Count Palatine of Zweibrücken-Birkenfield
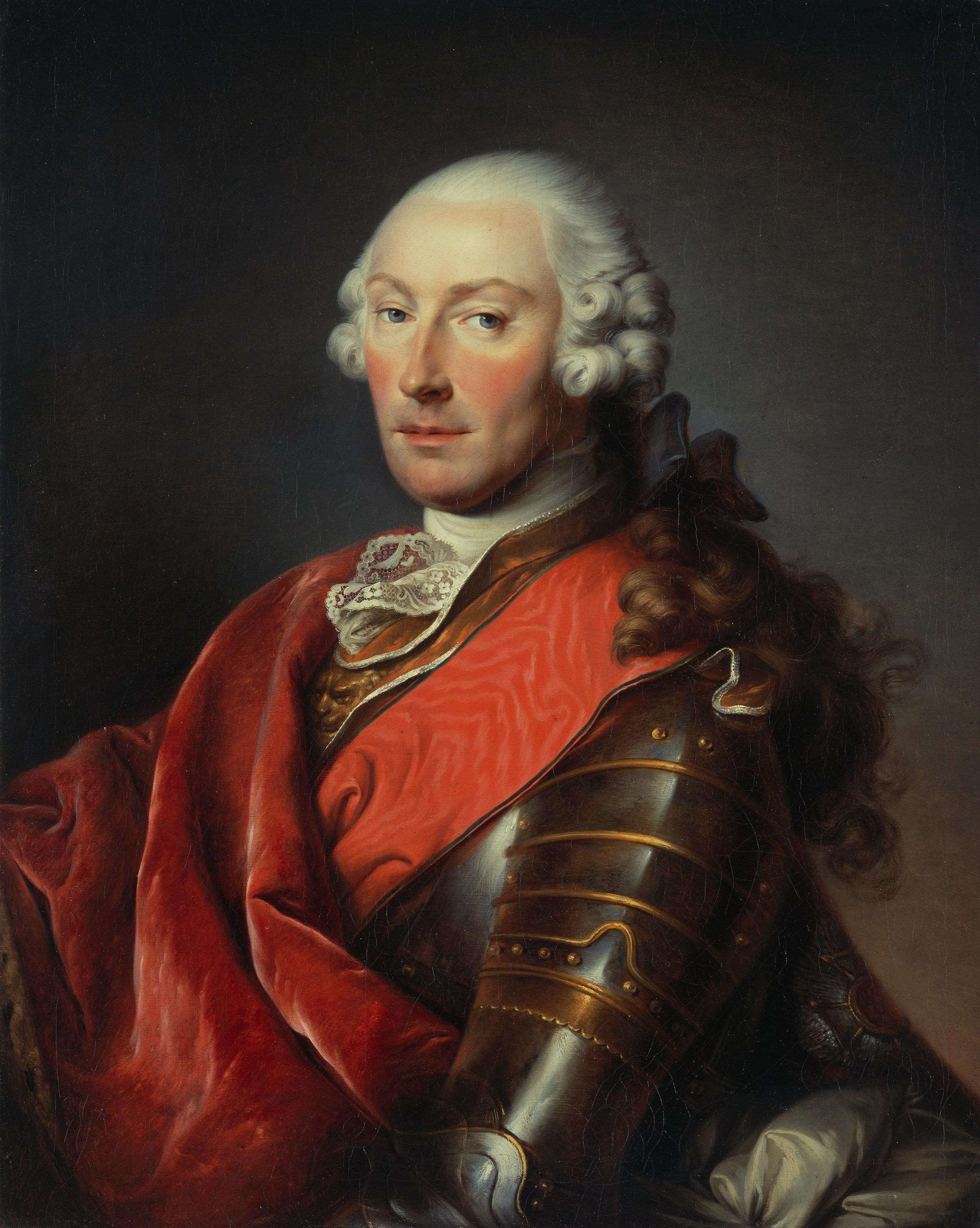
- Portrait, c. 1771
- Born: 6 September 1722; Bischweiler
- Died: 5 November 1775 (aged 53); Herschweiler-Pettersheim
- Spouse: Maria Johanna Camasse
- Issue: Christian von Zweibrücken, Count of Forbach; Wilhelm von Zweibrücken, Count of Forbach; Maria Anna Caroline von Zweibrücken; Karl Ludwig, Baron of Zweibrücken; Elisabeth von Zweibrücken; Julius, Baron of Zweibrücken
- House: Palatinate-Zweibrücken-Birkenfeld
- Father: Christian III, Count Palatine of Zweibrücken
- Mother: Caroline of Nassau-Saarbrücken

Christian IV, Count Palatine of Zweibrücken-Birkenfeld (6 September 1722 in Bischweiler – 5 November 1775 in Herschweiler-Pettersheim) was Duke of Zweibrücken from 1735 to 1775.

== Early life and family ==
Christian IV was born in Bischweiler on 6 September 1722, the son of Christian III, Count Palatine of Zweibrücken and his wife, Caroline of Nassau-Saarbrücken.

== Art and culture ==
He constructed Schloss Jägersburg, one of the first examples of a neoclassical palace in Germany.

== Marriage and issue ==
In 1751 he married, morganatically, Maria Johanna Camasse (created Countess of Forbach in 1757). They had six children, who were unable to succeed to their father's Duchy due to the morganatic nature of their parents' marriage at first, but in 1792 were allowed to carry the name Freiherr von Zweibrücken:

- Christian, Count of Forbach, Marquis of Deux-Ponts (1752–1817), Royal Bavarian General der Infanterie
- Philippe Guillaume (later renamed to Wilhelm), Count of Forbach, Viscount of Deux-Ponts (1754–1807)
- Maria Anna Caroline von Zweibrücken (1756–1806)
- Karl Ludwig, Baron of Zweybrücken (1759–63)
- Elisabeth Auguste Friederike von Zweibrücken (1766–1836)
- Julius August Maximilian, Baron of Zweybrücken (1771–73)

His grandson Christian Freiherr von Zweibrücken (son of Philipp Guillaume) was a Royal Bavarian General der Kavallerie and Generalkapitän of the Hartschiere.

== Ancestry ==
Ancestors of Christian IV, Count Palatine of Zweibrücken

16. Charles I, Count Palatine of Zweibrücken-Birkenfeld
8. Christian I, Count Palatine of Birkenfeld-Bischweiler
17. Dorothea of Brunswick-Lüneburg
4. Christian II, Count Palatine of Zweibrücken-Birkenfeld
18. John II, Count Palatine of Zweibrücken
9. Countess Palatine Magdalene Catherine of Zweibrücken
19. Catherine de Rohan
2. Christian III, Count Palatine of Zweibrücken
20. Eberhard, Count of Rappoltstein
10. Johann Jakob, Count of Rappoltstein
21. Wild- and Rhinegravine Anna of Salm-Kyrburg
5. Countess Katharina Agathe of Rappoltstein
22. Johann Kasimir, Count of Salm-Kyrburg
11. Wild- and Rhinegravine Anna Claudia of Salm-Kyrburg
23. Countess Dorothea of Solms-Laubach
1. Christian IV, Count Palatine of Zweibrücken
24. William Louis, Count of Nassau-Saarbrücken
12. Gustav Adolph, Count of Nassau-Saarbrücken
25. Anna Amalia of Baden-Durlach
6. Louis Crato, Count of Nassau-Saarbrücken
26. Crato V, Count of Hohenlohe-Neuenstein
13. Countess Eleonore Claire of Hohenlohe-Neuenstein
27. Countess Palatine Sophie of Zweibrücken-Birkenfeld
3. Caroline of Nassau-Saarbrücken
28. Philip Ernest, Count of Hohenlohe-Langenburg
14. Henry Frederick, Count of Hohenlohe-Langenburg
29. Countess Anna Maria of Solms-Sonnenwalde and Pouch
7. Princess Philippine Henriette of Hohenlohe-Langenburg
30. Wolfgang George I, Count of Castell-Remlingen
15. Countess Juliana Dorothea of Castell-Remlingen
31. Countess Sophie Juliana of Hohenlohe-Waldenburg-Pfedelbach

== See also ==
- Hôtel des Deux-Ponts

Christian IV, Count Palatine of Zweibrücken House of Palatinate-Zweibrücken-Birkenfeld Cadet branch of the House of Wittelsbach Born: 6 September 1722 Died: 5 November 1775
| Preceded by Christian III | Duke of Zweibrücken; 1735–1775 | Succeeded by Charles II August |
