= Hartschier =

Militant units in Bavaria

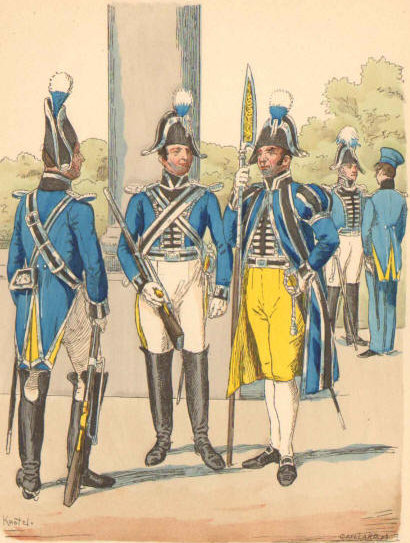
Uniforms of the Bavarian Hartschiere before 1852

Hartschiere (singular form: Hartschier) were predominantly members of the Bavarian residence guards before 1918, a historic military branch of the former Duchy and the later Electorate and at last Kingdom of Bavaria.

== History ==
According to Meyers Konversations-Lexikon, the Germanized word Hartschier originally derived from the Italian word arciere for archer, but it might also be possible that it has Spanish roots, because the Bavarian Duke William IV received a Spanish archer company (Spanish: arqueros) of Charles I of Spain and added Bavarian court bodyguards with notable roots in the deep Middle Ages. On April 13, 1669, Ferdinand Maria transformed this unit to the Hartschier-Garde. The name of the former Austrian equivalent, the k.k. Arcièren-Leibgarde, is similar-sounding.

The Bavarian palace guard troop, later called Königlich-Bayerische Leibgarde der Hartschier (L.G.H.), had only ceremonial and no conventional military functions. Relating to military affairs, the Command of the Leibgarde der Hartschiere was directly subordinated to the Army Ministry. By contrast the Leibgarde der Hartschiere by itself was subordinated, concerning civilian and criminal justiciable affairs, to the General Command in Munich like the other military branches. In addition to the Hartschiere, the kings of Bavaria had a royal house regiment from the end of the Napoleonic Wars until the fall of the kingdom after World War I, the so-called Infantry Lifeguards Regiment.

Entrance to this Guard was only possible for soldiers of impeccable character and conduct. The commander of the Hartschier troop had the title Generalkapitän (see also Captain General), associated with the highest class ranking in the Hofrangordnung (court order of precedence). He was appointed personally by the king.

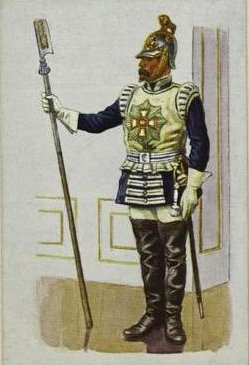
Uniforms of the Bavarian Hartschiere after 1852

In 1852 the Hartschiere got new uniforms with white supra vests over their jackets and helmets instead of the former caps, made of nickeled tin and gilded cast brass. The golden helmet plate showed the royal coats of arms and on top of the helmet was a standing golden lion figure. The helmet was worn with the lion for normal service, which was replaced by a white horsehair plume on full dress occasions. The embroidered patch on the chest of the Hartschiere showed a large version of the Order of Saint Hubertus (Hubertusorden) with its motto "in trau vast" (means: be firm in fidelity). The Hartschiere were armed with épées and the halberd-like "couse".

On the occasion of the 200th anniversary a commemorative medal (2 Ducats) with a portrait of Ludwig II of Bavaria was given out in 1869.

== General-Capitaines ==
- Before 1806 to 1807 - Wilhelm Frhr von Zweibrücken (1754-1807). General-Leutnant
- From 1807 - Ferdinand Graf von Minucci, General-Leutnant
- From at least 1824 to 1829 - Hypolit Graf von Marsigli (1761-1829), General-Leutnant
- 1830 to 1836 - Maximilian Joseph Graf von Preysing-Moos (1760-1836), General-Leutnant
- 1837 to 1845 - Maximilian Graf Seyssel d’Aix (1776-185), General-Leutnant
- 1845 to 1859 - Christian Frhr von Zweibrücken (1782-1859). General der Kavallerie. Son of General-Capitän Wilhelm Frhr von Zweibrücken.
- 1861 to 1872 - Leonhard Frhr von Hohenhausen (1788-1872), General der Kavallerie
- 1873 to 1875 - Friedrich du Jarrys Frhr von La Roche (1802-1876), General der Kavallerie
- 1876 to 1888 - Siegmund von Pranckh (1821-1888), General der Infanterie
- 1888 to 1909 - Maximilian Graf von Verri della Bosia (1824-1909), General der Infanterie
- 1909 to 1918 - Felix Graf von Bothmer (1852-1937), General der Infanterie, last General-Capitän
