= Forbach Granite =

Type of granite rock

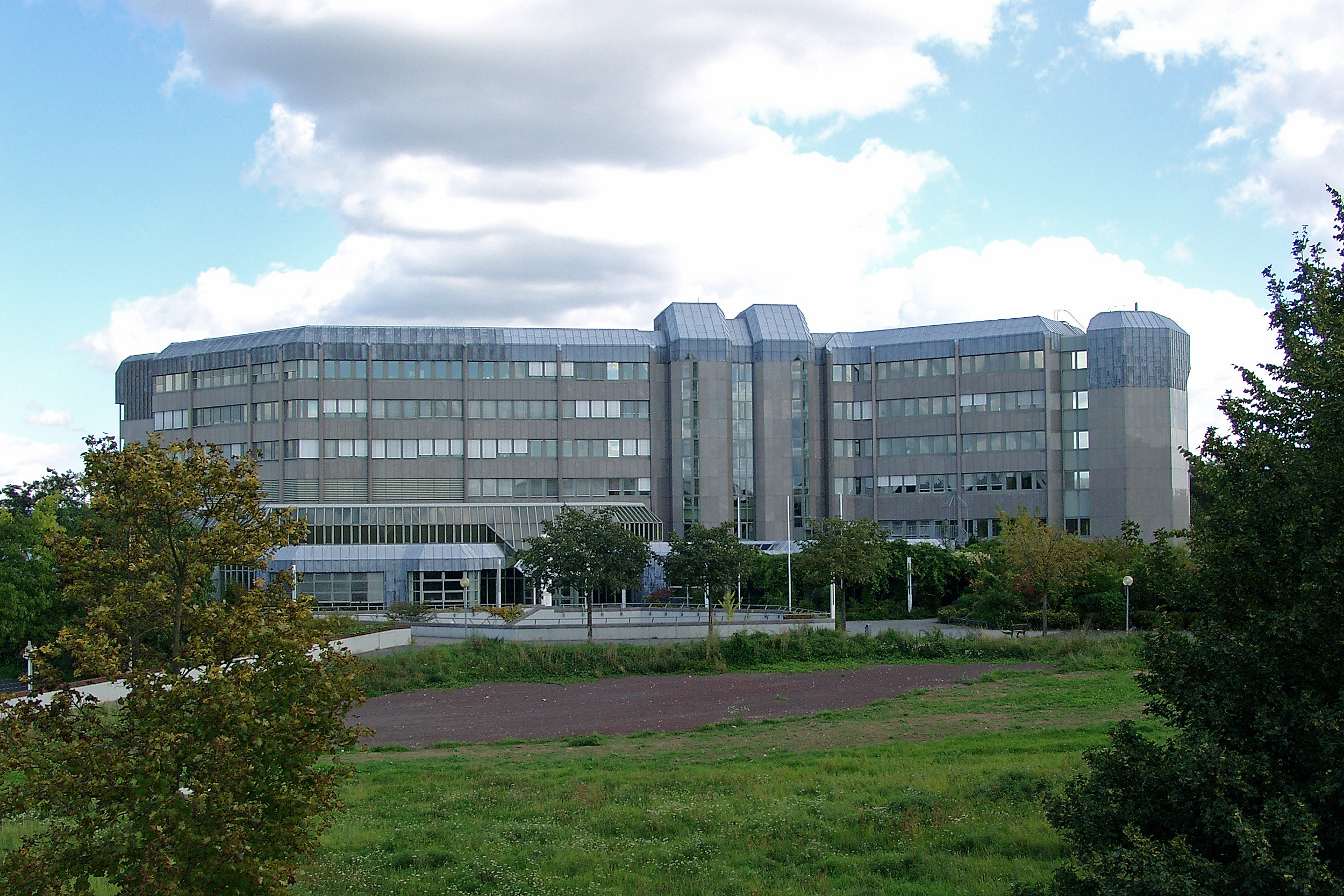
Facade cladding of red Forbach granite on the German Federal Archives in Koblenz

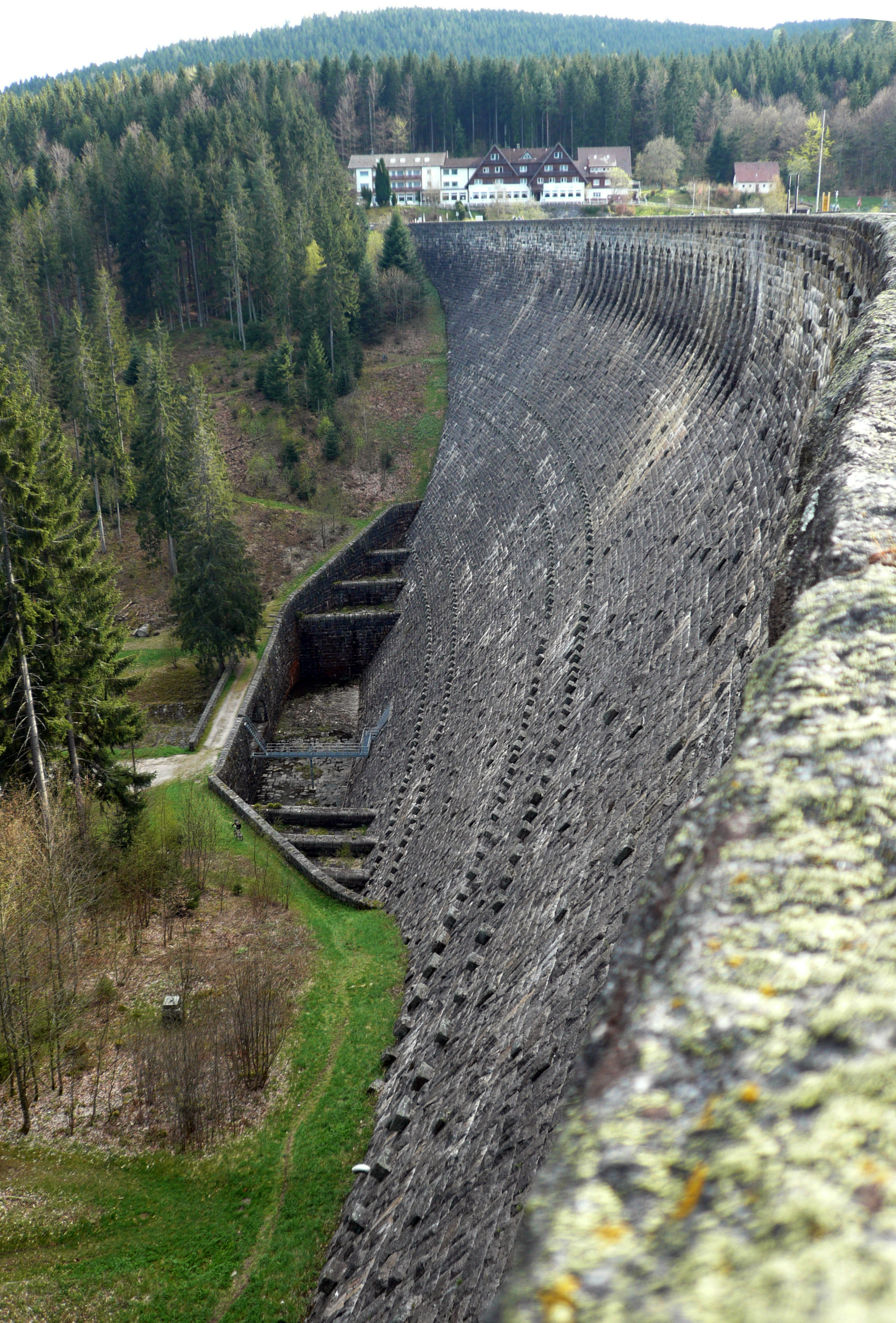
Schwarzenbach Dam with cladding of Raumünzach granite

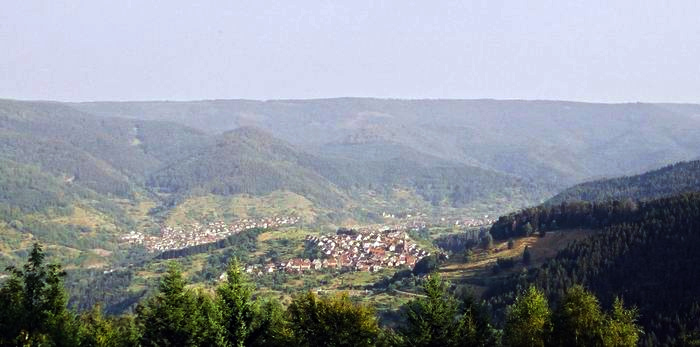
Murg valley. Foreground: Bermersbach. Left, in the valley, Gausbach. Right rear: Forbach.

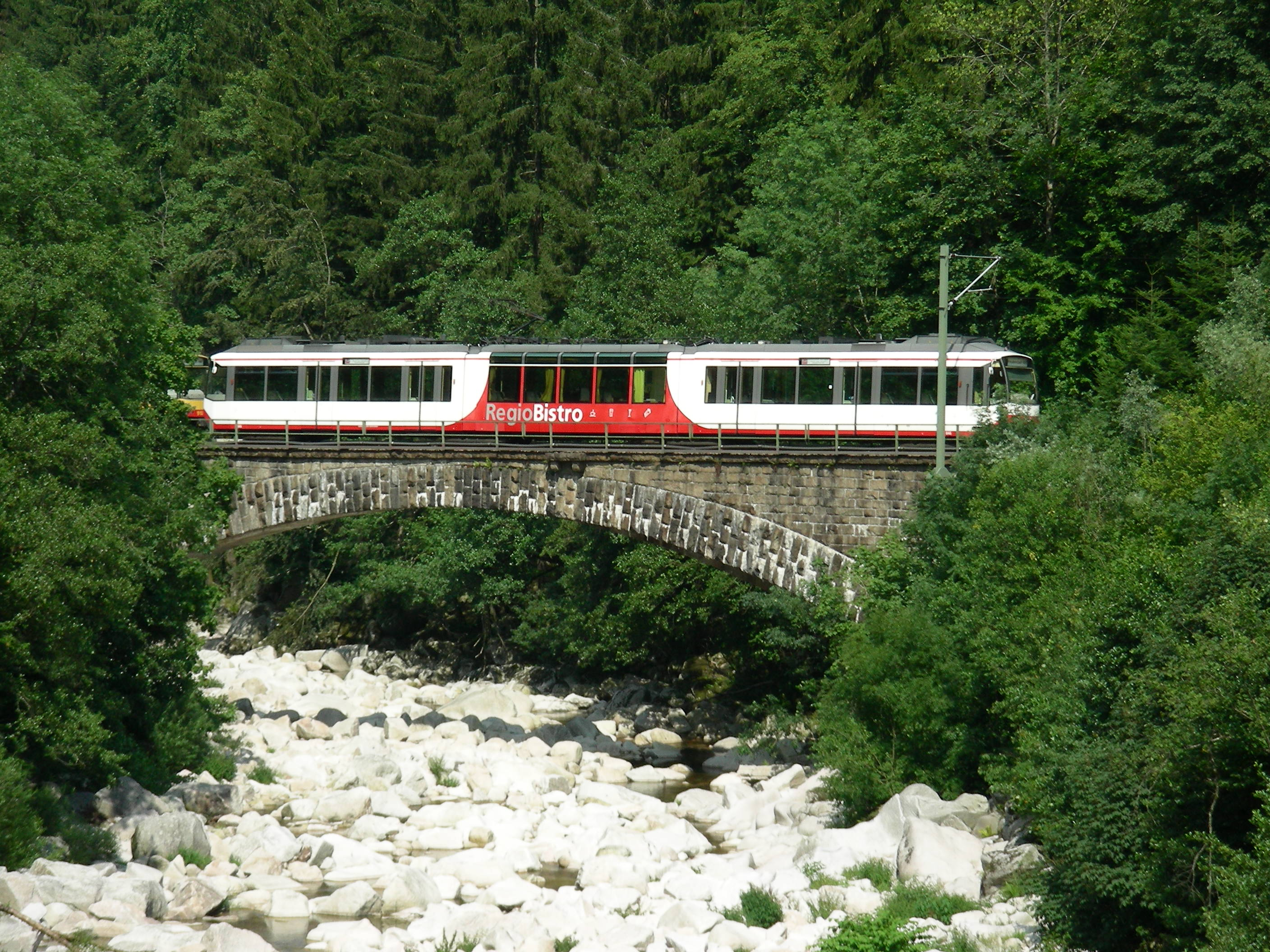
Bridge made of Forbach granite over the Murg near Raumünzach

Forbach Granite (German: Forbachgranit), also called Raumünzach Granite (Raumünzach-Granit), is a type of granite rock that occurs in the Northern Black Forest. It is part of the Northern Black Forest's granitic massif, to which Bühlertal granite and Wildbad granite also belong. Forbach granite predominantly outcrops in the counties of Calw and Rastatt. The most important quarrying area for Forbach granite used to be the middle Murg valley near Forbach. Today it is only quarried near Raumünzach.

Forbach Granite is about 305 million years old. The stone is coarse-grained - this points to a slowly cooling of the lava / magma (at the time the formation of the stone).

Forbach Granite is a bright mica, coloured from gray to pink. Forbach Granite includes the following minerals.

- Alkali feldspars (up to 44 percent) have a size of up to 5 centimetre and leads to a red colour.
- Quartz (26 percent).
- Plagioclase (20 percent)
- Muscovite (5 percent)
- Biotite (5 percent) and leads to the distinct structured texture.
- Apatite (below 1 percent)
- Monazite(rare)
- Xenotime (rare)

== Literature ==
- W. Dienemann und O. Burre: Die nutzbaren Gesteine Deutschlands und ihre Lagerstätten mit Ausnahme der Kohlen, Erze und Salze, Enke-Verlag, Stuttgart, 1929, p. 2
- Otto Franz Geyer, Manfred P. Gwinner: Geologie von Baden-Württemberg. 3rd fully revised edition, Schweizerbart, Stuttgart, 1986, ISBN 3-510-65126-X.
- Wolf-Dieter Grimm: Bildatlas wichtiger Denkmalgesteine der Bundesrepublik Deutschland. Published by the Bayerischen Landesamt für Denkmalpflege, Lipp-Verlag, Munich, 1990, ISBN 3-87490-535-7, Rock no. 011.
