= Royal Deux-Ponts Regiment =

Line infantry regiment of the French Royal Army

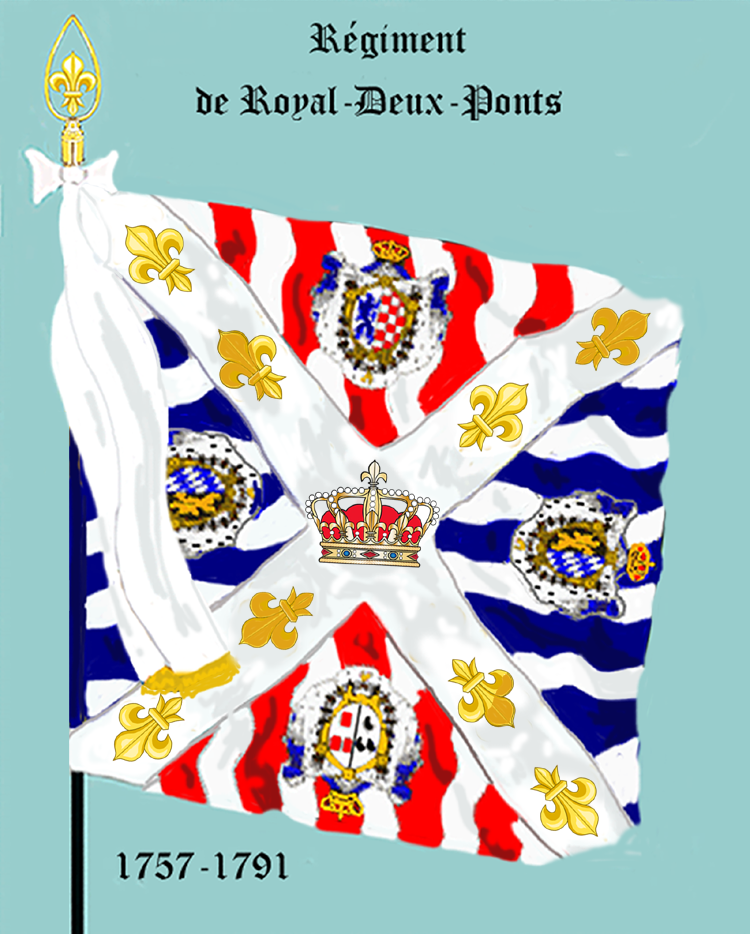
- Regimental colour of the Royal Deux-Ponts Regiment
- Active: 1757–1791
- Country: France
- Branch: France Army
- Type: Infantry
- Role: Line infantry
- Size: Regiment
- Facings: Yellow
- Engagements: Seven Years' War; Battle of Rossbach; Battle of Sandershausen; Battle of Lutterberg; Battle of Bergen; Battle of Minden; Battle of Corbach; Battle of Stangenrod; Battle of Villinghausen; Battle of Fürstenberg; Battle of Sababurg; Battle of Wolfenbüttel; American Revolutionary War; Siege of Yorktown

Commanders
- Notable commanders: Comté de Deux-Ponts

The Royal Deux-Ponts Regiment (French: Régiment Royal-Deux-Ponts; German: Infanterieregiment Königlich Zweibrücken) was a line infantry regiment of the French Royal Army raised in the Palatine Zweibrücken which existed from 1757 to 1791. They are an example of the policy of Soldatenhandel.

== History ==
The Royal Deux-Ponts Regiment was raised by Christian IV, Duke of Deux-Ponts, Count Palatine of Birkenfeld, under a treaty made in 1751 between Louis XV and Christian, by which the Duke undertook to provide in the event of war a contingent of 1,000 men to France. In 1775 it was commanded by Colonel Christian, Count of Forbach, nephew of the Duke of Deux-Ponts and future Marquis de Deux-Ponts. The Marquis was colonel-commandant from March 10, 1788 until January 1, 1791, when it was reorganised into the 99th Line Infantry Regiment.

=== American Revolutionary War ===
The Royal Deux-Ponts Regiment left Brest on April 4, 1780 as part of a contingent of four regiments sent by France under the orders of Rochambeau to provide support to the American Revolution. It distinguished itself at Yorktown in October 1781. The regiment returned to France in July 1783.

== Uniform ==
During the American Revolutionary War, the uniform was sky blue with distinctive yellow facings.
