= 99th Infantry Regiment (France) =

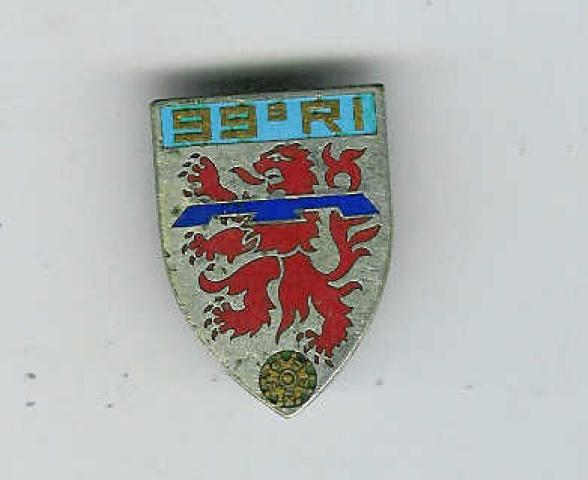
Unit insignia

The 99th Infantry Regiment (French - 99e régiment d'infanterie or 99e RI) was an infantry regiment of the French Army. It was formed in 1791 by renaming the Royal Deux-Ponts Regiment and fought in the French Revolutionary Wars before being merged into another unit in 1803.

The second incarnation of the 99th Infantry Regiment was originally formed in 1796 as the 24th Light Demi-Brigade, was renamed the 44th Light Infantry Regiment and finally (in 1855) the 99th Infantry Regiment. It disbanded in 1997. It kept the traditions of the 44th Light Infantry Regiment as well as reviving the traditions and battle honours of the previous 99th Infantry Regiment. Its motto was Ne Pas Subir and its marching song Au vieux 99, au vieux 99, tire au cul tu seras bien vu, tire au flanc tu seras content.

== History ==
On 1 January 1791 the National Constituent Assembly decided to remove the Royal Deux-Ponts Regiment's royal affiliation and rename it the 99th Line Infantry Regiment. On 21 July that year it lost its original status as a foreign-raised regiment and was fully integrated into the French army. It helped pursue the fleeing Prussians at Valmy and at Jemmapes in 1792 and in the battles of Blaton, Neerwinden and Kaiserslautern in 1793.

In 1793 it also became the 99th Battle Demi-Brigade, formed of the 1st Battalion of the 50th Line Infantry Regiment and the 4th and 9th Volunteer Battalions of Les Bouches-due-Rhône. It fought at the battle of Fleurus (1794) before being transferred to the armée d'Italie, in which it fought at Ponte-di-Nova on 16 April, Sotta on 26 May and Rochetta on 21 September. It then fought at Loano on 22 November 1795 and at Voltri, Millesimo, Dego, Montenotte, Fombio and Borghetto during the 1796 Italian campaign.

Its composition was also changed in 1796 - from then on it was made up of the 127th Battle Demi-Brigade (1st Battalion of the 68th Line Infantry Regiment, 2nd Eure Volunteer Battalion and 5th Haute-Marne Volunteer Battalion) and 172nd Battle Demi-Brigade (2nd Battalion of the 94th Line Infantry Regiment, 4th Marne Volunteer Battalion and 6th Marne Volunteer Battalion). It continued serving in 1796, taking part in the fighting at Limburg an der Lahn, Altenkirchen, Neubof and Mainz.

It was sent back to Italy in 1798, fighting in 1799 at the Trebbia, Bassignana, Novi, Fossano and Mondovi and in 1800 in the Var campaign and the crossing of the Mincio. In 1803 the unit was amalgamated with the 62nd Line Infantry Regiment.

=== Second incarnation ===
The 24th Light Demi-Brigade was formed in May 1796 and sent on the 1797 expédition d'Irlande, in which two of its three troopships were wrecked, drowning 705 men. Augustin Pons (1774–1854) served in the 2nd formation then in 24th Light Infantry Regiment, rising from corporal to lieutenant. The unit served in 1797 at Neuwied and Neuhof, in 1800 in the crossing of the Grand-Saint-Bernard, Marengo, Marcaria, Pozzolo and the siege of Verona. It was renamed the 24th Light Infantry Regiment in 1803, fighting at Nordlingen and Austerlitz in 1805, Jena in 1806, Eylau, Lomitten, Heilsberg and Friedland in 1807 and Abensberg, Eckmühl, Ratisbonne, Wagram and Essling in 1809. It took part in the French invasion of Russia and the subsequent retreat, including Borodino, Dresden, Leipzig and Brienne before finally being disbanded in 1814.

The regiment was re-formed in 1840 and took part in suppressing the June Days in Paris from 23 to 26 June 1848. It was renumbered as the 99th Infantry Regiment in 1855 and soon afterwards took part in the conquest of Algeria from 1855 to 1859. It formed part of 5th Corps during the 1859 Italian campaign but saw no actual fighting. Next it was put on garrison duties in Saint-Malo, Laval and Saint-Brieuc before being sent as part of the French intervention in Mexico, taking part in the siege of Puebla and the battle of Aculcingo and winning the légion d’honneur at the latter. It returned to garrison duties in Vienne and was still there on the outbreak on the Franco-Prussian War in 1870 – it fought at Frœschwiller on 6 August and Sedan in September, whilst three of its companies were used to form the 44th Marching Regiment, which fought at Chilleurs, Ladon, Boiscommun, Neuville-aux-Bois and Maizières in the Loiret.

It spent the next forty years on garrison duties at Nîmes (1871–1873), Gap (1873), Embrun (1873), Briançon (1873), Montélimar (1874), Vienne (1875–1885), Lyon (1875–1885), Lyon (1885–1889), Romans (1885–1889), Lyon (1889–1893), Gap (1893–1896), Mont-Dauphin (1893–1896), Lyon (1896–1902), Bourgoin (1896–1902), Gap (1902–1905), Mont-Dauphin (1902–1905), Ubaye (1902–1905), Queyras (1902–1905), Vienne (1905–1914) and Lyon (1905–1914). On mobilisation in 1914 it was based in Vienne and formed part of 55th Infantry Brigade, 28th Infantry Division and 14th Army Corps. It fought in the 1914 campaign in the Vosges and in March the following year its depot formed two companies of the new 414th Infantry Regiment. Captain Félix Fontan (1880–1914) was commanding its 12th Company in October 1914. Captain Jacques Lazare Olchanski (1891–1918) also served with the regiment. It fought in the 2nd Battle of Champagne in September and October 1915, at Verdun in 1916 and Chemin des Dames in 1917. In the battle of the Lys (1918) it had to hold mont Kemmel for two hours on 24 April under heavy artillery assault, then at 6am it was attacked with trench mortars by a Bavarian division.

It was mobilised in September 1939 at Lyon and Modane as 99th Alpine Infantry Regiment under the command of colonel Lacaze, forming part of 28th Alpine Infantry Division on the Italian border. It was then based in northern Alsace from November 1939 to April 1940 before being rested near Poligny (Jura) before finding itself back at Chemin des Dames from 18 May 1940, twenty-three years after previously fighting there. The regiment was disbanded a few weeks later, though some of its men took part in the Ain-Jura resistance, a battle honour which was later added to its colours. The regiment re-formed in December 1944 on the Alpine front, where it took part in the recapture of the col de Larche (22–26 April 1945).

In the post-war period it was sometimes a regiment and sometimes a battalion, providing men for the 25th Foot Chasseurs Battalion on its creation in June 1954 for the Tunisian campaign. In November 1954 it was converted into a Marching Regiment, the 99e BMIA, for the Algerian campaign – under that name it briefly also stayed in Morocco in August and September 1955. On 1 October it was renamed 15th Alpine Chasseurs Battalion, marking the end of the presence of a unit numbered 99 in north Africa. What was left of the former 99th in mainland France was nicknamed the "neuf-neuf" or the "régiment de Lyon" and found itself demoted to training recruits for Algeria and to supporting the 8th Military Region.

On 1 October 1968 it reverted to its original name of 99th Infantry Regiment and was detached from the mountain troops. In 1978 it formed a reserve regiment, the 299th Infantry Regiment. From 1982 to 1986 it provided several detachments for the fighting in Lebanon and from 1989 its 1st Combat Company was converted to special forces duties. Its last theatre of operations was Bosnia in 1992 and 1993 and the regiment was finally disbanded on 31 May 1997.

== Colonels ==
- 1781 : marquis de Custine;
- 1786 : Maximilien Constantin de Wurmser (*);
- 1791 : Louis-Amable de Prez;
- 1792 : Jean-Christophe Wisch (**; wounded 2 March 1792);
- 1793 : Jean François Leval (**);

=== 1803–1814 (as 44th Light Infantry Regiment) ===
- unknown date : Antoine Alexandre Julienne de Bélair (killed whilst commanding the unit on 8 December 1810.)

=== 1855–1997 ===
- 1863 : colonel Louis Albert Chagrin de Saint-Hilaire;
- 1870–1876 : colonel François Gouzil;
- 1898–1902 : colonel Charles Anglade;
- 1905–1908 : colonel Joseph Louis Alphonse Baret;
- January – November 1914 : lieutenant-colonel Paul Joseph Hyacinthe Mignot (**);
- August 1914 : lieutenant-colonel Marty;
- September 1914 : lieutenant-colonel Arbey;
- 1916–1923 : colonel Borne;
- September 1939 : colonel Lacaze;
- 1977–1978 : colonel Leproust

== Chefs de brigade ==
- 1793 : Élie Lafont (*);
- 1796 : Pierre Joseph Petit;
- 1798 : Georges Mouton;

(*) Officers who later became brigadier generals (**) Officers who later became divisional generals.

== Bibliography (in French) ==
- Colonel (h) André Mudler Président de l’Amicale des anciens des 99e et 299e RI.
- Historique du 99e régiment d'infanterie : 1914–1918, Bergerac, Impr. générale du sud-ouest, 1920, 40 p.

== External links (in French) ==
- Historique du 99e régiment d'infanterie.
- Historique du 99e régiment d'infanterie 1914–1918.
- Amicale Royal deux-ponts / 99e et 299e RI.
