= Wilhelm of the Palatinate-Zweibrücken =

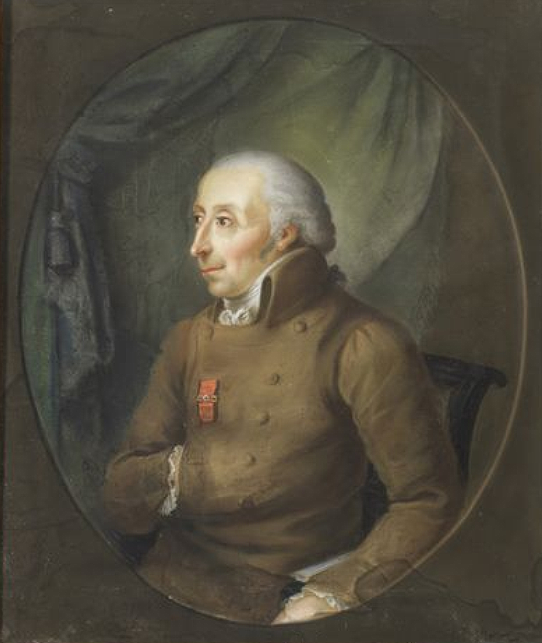
Portrait of Wilhelm, late 18th/early 19th century

Philippe Guillaume aka Philipp Wilhelm Graf von Forbach, then Vicomte de Deux-Ponts and later Freiherr von Zweibrücken (1754–1807) was an officer of the French and later general of the Bavarian Army.

== Early life and ancestry ==
Wilhelm von Zweibrücken was the second of six children of Christian IV Herzog von Pfalz-Zweibrücken and Maria Johanna Camasse, Gräfin von Forbach (1734–1807). The children were unable to succeed to their father's Duchy due to the morganatic nature of their parents' marriage at first, but were allowed to wear the name Freiherr von Zweibrücken in 1792.

== Biography ==
Due to a former business agreement of Louis XV of France and his father from March 1751, who promised to the French king to raise a German battalion of infantry for France when and if needed, the Infantry Regiment "Royal Deux-Ponts" (raised on 19, 1757) of two battalions to the French crown after the outbreak of the Seven Years' War, when it was at first deployed in the Battle of Rossbach. The commander of the regiment at this time was his older brother Christian, and Wilhelm was deputy commander.

In 1780, he married Martine-Adelaide de Polastron (1760–1795). The couple had four children, named Christian (1782–1859, a later general), Karl (1784–1812), Maria Anna, Gräfin von Forbach (1785–1857) and Henriette.

As part of De Rochambeau's expedition corps the "Royal Deux-Ponts" during the American Revolutionary War, where the regiment served in the siege of Yorktown, also called the "German Battle", on October 4, 1781. Especially the assault of Redoubt 9 by 400 French regulars under his command, that opened the British defenses was mentioned. After the French Revolution, he served as a general in the Bavarian army, and died in Munich, where he and his brother Christian are buried in the Old Southern Cemetery.

In the European Rosegarden in Zweibrücken there is a memorial of him and his brother.

== Military Service ==
Kingdom of France

- Capitaine-en-second, Régiment de Schomberg dragons, no later than 1773 to 1776
- Colonel-Lieutenant-en-Second, Infantry Royal Deux-Ponts Regiment, 1777 to 1782
- Mestre-de-Camp-Commandant (Colonel, commanding), Régiment de Deux-Ponts Dragons, 1782-1791

Kingdom of Bavaria

- General-Leutnant, Bavarian Army, ca. 1795
- General-Captain (Captain of the Guard), Leibgarde der Hartschier, 12 October 1804 to 21 July 1807

== Orders and Awards ==
Kingdom of Bavaria

- Order of Saint Hubert, Knight (Ritter), 5 April 1806

Kingdom of France

- Order of Saint Louis, Knight (chevalier), 1783

United States

- Society of the Cincinnati, Member, 1783
