= Christian of the Palatinate-Zweibrücken (1782–1859) =

Bavarian general (1782–1859)

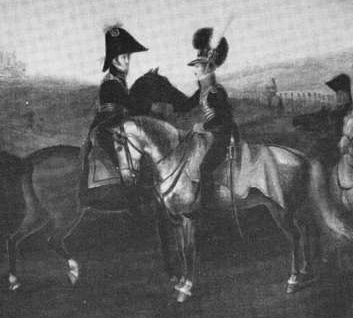

Christian Marianne Wilhelm August Franz Freiherr von Zweibrücken, before 1792 Graf von Forbach, (30 August 1782 – 25 April 1859) was a Bavarian General der Kavallerie, and later Generalkapitän of the Leibgarde der Hartschiere. He may not be confused with his uncle Christian Freiherr von Zweibrücken (aka Christian Graf von Forbach, 1752–1817), who was a Bavarian General der Infanterie.

Christian von Zweibrücken, grandson of Christian IV Herzog von Pfalz-Zweibrücken, was born as son of the officer Philippe Guillaume (later renamed to Wilhelm) Freiherr von Zweibrücken (born Graf von Forbach, 1754–1807) and Martine-Adélaïde Comtesse de Polastron (1760–1795) in Forbach. He had three siblings. When he was born, he had the last name of his grandmother Maria Johanna Camasse Gräfin von Forbach like his father, uncles and aunts. They were allowed to wear the name Freiherr von Zweibrücken in 1792.

He was married two times. At first he was married to Christiane Freiin von Guttenberg-Steinenhausen (1798–1817) on 24 July 1798, and after her death to Karoline Friederike Walpurga Marie von Rechberg und Rothenlöwen (1798–1878) on 4 August 1818. He had a baby with his first wife, named Karoline Therese, who was born in February 1817 and died in October 1818. Christian von Zweibrücken died in Munich.
