= Christian of the Palatinate-Zweibrücken (1752–1817) =

Franco-German general (1752–1817)

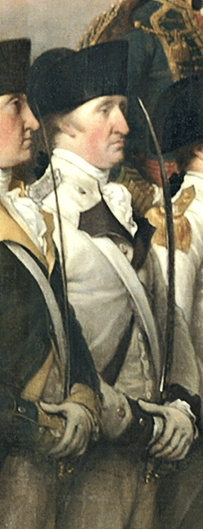
Christian (left, partly cut off) depicted in Surrender of Lord Cornwallis by John Trumbull.

Christian Graf von Forbach, then Christian Marquis de Deux-Ponts and later Christian Freiherr von Zweibrücken (20 November 1752 – 25 October 1817) was an officer of the French Army and later a general of the Royal Prussian and then of the Bavarian Army, at last in the rank of General der Infanterie. He should not be confused with his nephew Christian Freiherr von Zweibrücken (aka Christian Graf von Forbach, 1782–1859), who was a Bavarian General of Cavalry (General der Kavallerie).

== Early life and ancestry ==
Christian von Zweibrücken was the first of six children of Christian IV Herzog von Pfalz-Zweibrücken and Maria Johanna Camasse, Gräfin von Forbach (1734–1807). He was born in Zweibrücken. The children were unable to succeed to their father's Duchy due to the morganatic nature of their parents' marriage. The Duchy of Zweibrücken was inherited by Christian IV's nephews (Christian's first cousins), Charles August and Maximilian Joseph.

From his birth to about the American Revolution, Christian used the name Christian Graf von Forbach. From about 1776 until the French Revolution, and while serving in the French Army, he used the name Christian, comte des Deux Ponts and was later elevated to marquis des Deux Ponts. Fleeing France for Germany during the Revolution, he was granted permission to use Christian Freiherr von Zweibrücken from 1792 forward.

== Biography ==
Due to a former business agreement from March 1751 between Louis XV of France and Christian's father, who promised to the French king to raise a battalion of infantry for France when and if needed, the Infantry Regiment "Royal Deux-Ponts" (raised on 19, 1757) of two battalions to the French crown after the outbreak of the Seven Years' War, when it was at first deployed in the Battle of Rossbach.

During the American Revolutionary War, Christian commanded the French Infantry Regiment "Royal Deux-Ponts" as Colonel-titulaire, and his brother Philippe Guillaume (later renamed to Wilhelm) was Colonel-en-second and deputy commander as part of De Rochambeau's expedition. The regiment served in the Battle of Yorktown, also called the "German Battle", on October 4, 1781. In 1783 he married Adélaïde-Françoise de Béthune-Pologne (1761–1823). The couple had three daughters. The first of them Maria Amalia Charlotte Auguste died in her year of birth 1784. The others were Maria Amalia Charlotte Franziska Auguste Eleonore (1786–1839) and Kasimira Maria Louise Antoinette (1787–1846).

During the French Revolution, he left the French forces at the rank of a Maréchal de Camp (Major General). Titled Freiherr von Zweibrücken, he served in the Prussian Army in the rank of General-Major, where he took part in the campaigns against France during 1794 and 1797.

With the rise of his first cousin, Maximilian Joseph as Prince Elector of Bavaria, 1799, Christian served in the Bavarian Army, where he became General-Leutnant and provincial commander of the Palatinate region. In spring of 1800 he became commander of a division, merged from the brigades of Von Deroy and von Wrede, and fought under the Austrian Feldzeugmeister Kray and under Archduke John of Austria against France for the British crown.

In 1808 he became Geheimer Rat (German: Privy Councilor), and in January 1811 he was promoted to the rank of General der Infanterie. Obviously Von Zweibrücken had also plans to replace von Montgelas by his son-in-law Graf Karl Ernst von Gravenreuth (1771–1826), who was married to his daughter Kasimira. He died in Munich, where he and his brother Wilhelm are buried in the Old Southern Cemetery.

In the European Rose Garden in Zweibrücken a memorial remembers him and his brother.

== Military Service ==
Kingdom of France:

- Sous Lieutenant, Infantry Régiment Royal-Deux-Ponts, 28 April 1768
- Capitaine-en-second, Royal Deux-Ponts Regiment, 16 April 1771
- Lieutenant Colonel, Royal Deux-Ponts Regiment, 3 July 1772
- Colonel-titulaire (Colonel, commanding in the field), Royal Deux-Ponts Regiment, 1776
  - Served in the American Revolution in the Comte de Rochambeau's Expédition Particulière and was present at Yorktown, 1781
- Mestre-de-Camp-commandant (Colonel, commanding), Royal Deux-Ponts Regiment, 1783
- Brigadier, 1 January 1784
- Maréchal-de-Camp (Major General), 9 March 1788

Kingdom of Prussia:

- General-Major, Prussian Army, ca. 1791

Kingdom of Bavaria:

- General-Leutnant, Bavarian Army, 20 June 1799
- General der Infanterie, 1811

== Orders and Awards ==
Kingdom of Bavaria:

- Kurpfalz-Bavarian Military Honour Award ( Militär-Ehrenzeichen, predecessor of the Military Order of Max Joseph), 24 March 1801
- Military Order of Max Joseph, Grand Cross, 1 March 1806

Kingdom of France:

- Military Order of Saint-Louis, Knight (chevalier), 1783

Kingdom of Prussia:

- Order of the Red Eagle, Knight (Ritter, when it was a single class order), 6 June 1796

United States:

- Society of the Cincinnati, Member, 1783
