= Waldeck =

Waldeck may refer to:

== Places ==
=== Canada ===
- Waldeck, Nova Scotia, rural community in Nova Scotia
- Waldeck, Saskatchewan, a village in Saskatchewan

=== Europe ===
- Free State of Waldeck-Pyrmont, a constituent state of the Weimar Republic
- Principality of Waldeck and Pyrmont, a principality in the German Empire and German Confederation, and a state in the Weimar Republic
- Waldeck, Palatinate, a village in the Upper Palatinate, Bavaria, Germany
  - Waldeck Castle (Upper Palatinate), the remains of a castle near the village
- Waldeck Castle (Hunsrück), a medieval fortress/castle in Rhineland-Palatinate, Germany
- Waldeck-Eisenberg, a medieval principality of the Holy Roman Empire
- Waldeck-Frankenberg, a Kreis (district) in the north of Hesse, Germany
- Waldeck, Hesse, a town in Hesse, Germany
- Waldeck, historical German name of Orava Commune in Estonia
- Waldeck, The Hague, a neighbourhood in The Hague
- Waldeck, Thuringia, a small municipality in Thuringia, Germany

=== United States ===
- Waldeck, Kansas, a ghost town in Kansas
- Waldeck, Pennsylvania, an unincorporated community in Pennsylvania
- Waldeck, Texas, an unincorporated community in Texas

== People ==
- Adolf II of Waldeck (c. 1250–1302), count of Waldeck and prince bishop of Liège
- Alfred Meyer-Waldeck (1864–1928), German admiral
- Benedict Waldeck (1802–1870), deputy in the Prussian National Assembly
- Christian, Count of Waldeck-Wildungen (1585–1637), Count of Waldeck-Eisenberg and Count of Waldeck-Wildungen
- Christian August, Prince of Waldeck and Pyrmont (1744–1798), general in the Austrian service, and last Commander and Field Marshal of the Portuguese land army
- Christian Louis, Count of Waldeck (1635–1706), Count of Waldeck-Wildungen and Count of Waldeck and Pyrmont
- Count Ludwig Joseph von Boos-Waldeck (1798–1880), German noble who promoted the settling of Texas by Germans
- Emma of Waldeck and Pyrmont (1858–1934), Queen Consort and Regent of the Netherlands
- Franz von Waldeck (1491–1553), Prince-Bishop of Münster, Osnabrück, and Minden
- Friedrich Anton Ulrich, Prince of Waldeck and Pyrmont (1676–1728), first reigning Prince of Waldeck and Pyrmont
- Friedrich Karl August, Prince of Waldeck and Pyrmont (1743–1812), Prince of Waldeck and Pyrmont
- Friedrich, Prince of Waldeck and Pyrmont (1865–1946), the last reigning Prince of the German state of Waldeck and Pyrmont
- George I, Prince of Waldeck and Pyrmont (1747–1813), German Prince of Waldeck and Pyrmont
- George II, Prince of Waldeck and Pyrmont (1789–1845), German Prince of Waldeck and Pyrmont
- George Victor, Prince of Waldeck and Pyrmont (1831–1893), 3rd sovereign Prince of the German state of Waldeck and Pyrmont
- Henry VII, Count of Waldeck (died after 1442), Count of Waldeck
- Jean-Frédéric Waldeck (c. 1766–1875), French antiquarian, cartographer, artist and explorer
- Josias II, Count of Waldeck-Wildungen (1636–1669), Count of Waldeck-Wildungen
- Josias, Hereditary Prince of Waldeck and Pyrmont (1896–1967), German heir apparent to the throne of the Principality of Waldeck and Pyrmont and a General in the SS
- Karl August, Prince of Waldeck and Pyrmont (1704–1763), Commander of the Dutch forces in the War of Austrian Succession
- Klaus Waldeck (born 1966), Austrian musician
- Magdalene of Waldeck-Wildungen (1558–1599), daughter of Philip IV of Waldeck-Wildungen
- Philip III, Count of Waldeck (1486–1539), Count of Waldeck-Eisenberg
- Philip IV, Count of Waldeck (1493–1574), Count of Waldeck-Wildungen
- Pierre Waldeck-Rousseau (1846–1904), French Republican statesman
- Prince Georg Friedrich of Waldeck (1620–1692), German and Dutch Field Marshal
- Prince Wolrad of Waldeck and Pyrmont (1892–1914), youngest child of George Victor, Prince of Waldeck and Pyrmont
- Princess Caroline of Waldeck and Pyrmont (1748–1782), Duchess consort of Courland
- Princess Elisabeth of Waldeck and Pyrmont (1873–1961), youngest daughter of George Victor, Prince of Waldeck and Pyrmont
- Princess Helena of Waldeck and Pyrmont (1861–1922), German-born princess, a member of the British Royal Family by marriage
- Princess Helena of Waldeck and Pyrmont (1899–1948), only daughter of Friedrich, Prince of Waldeck and Pyrmont
- Princess Hermine of Waldeck and Pyrmont (1827–1910), second daughter of George II, Prince of Waldeck and Pyrmont
- Princess Ida of Waldeck and Pyrmont (1796–1869), member of the House of Waldeck and Pyrmont and a Princess of Waldeck and Pyrmont, Germany
- Princess Marie of Waldeck and Pyrmont (1857–1882), third daughter of George Victor, Prince of Waldeck and Pyrmont
- R. G. Waldeck (1898–1982), also known as Rosie Waldeck, German-born American author
- René Waldeck-Rousseau, father (1809–1882), French politician
- Sophie of Waldeck (1662–1702), Princess of Waldech by birth and by marriage Duchess of Saxe-Hildburghausen, Germany
- Waldeck L'Huillier (1905–1986), a French politician
- Waldeck Rochet (1905–1983), French politician
- Wittekind, Prince of Waldeck and Pyrmont (1936−2024), head of the House of Waldeck and Pyrmont
- Wolrad I, Count of Waldeck (1399–1475), son of Count Henry VII of Waldeck
