= Christian August, Prince of Waldeck and Pyrmont =

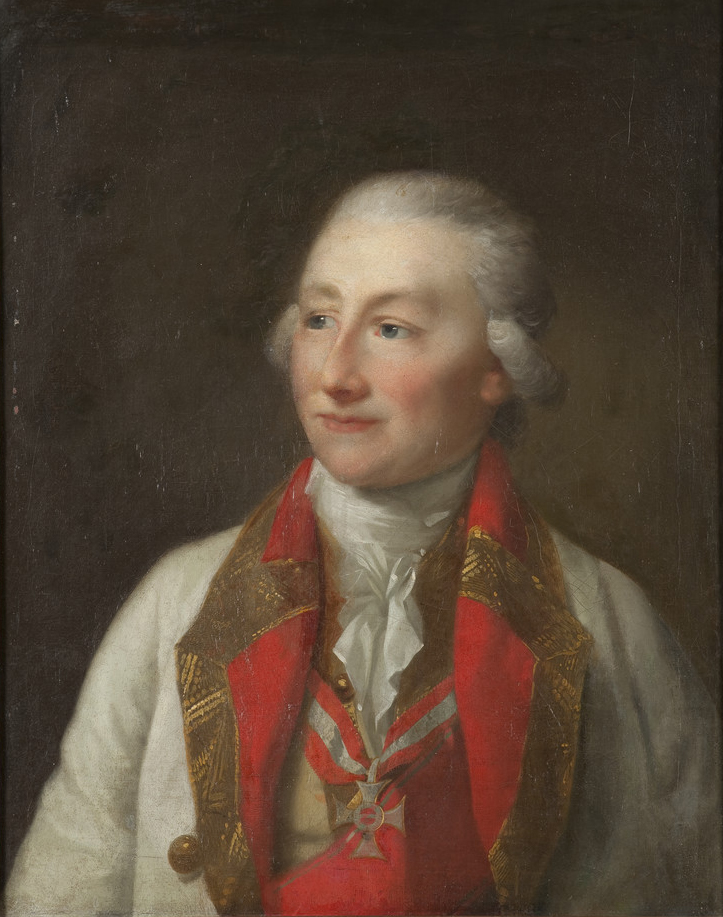
- Portrait of Christian August, 1789
- Born: 6 December 1744; Arolsen
- Died: 24 September 1798 (aged 53); Palácio Nacional de Sintra in Sintra
- Buried: Lisbon
- Father: Karl August, Prince of Waldeck and Pyrmont
- Mother: Countess Palatine Christiane Henriette of Zweibrücken-Birkenfeld

Christian August, Prince of Waldeck and Pyrmont (German: Christian August Prinz zu Waldeck; Portuguese: Cristiano Augusto; 6 December 1744, Arolsen – 24 September 1798, Palácio Nacional de Sintra, Sintra, near Lisbon) was a general in the Austrian service, and last commander and Field Marshal of the Portuguese land army.

== Life ==
Christian August was the third son of Prince Karl August of Waldeck and Pyrmont and his wife Countess Palatine Christiane Henriette of Zweibrücken-Birkenfeld.

He was a friend of the arts, and through his parents he was inspired by antiquity. Therefore, his Grand Tour took him to Italy where he was one of the temporary companions of Johann Wolfgang von Goethe on his Italian Journey. Goethe spoke approvingly of a common trip to Pozzuoli and "the company of such a perfect and well educated prince". Waldeck suggested to Goethe to travel together to Croatia and Greece. Goethe declined: "If one looks out into the world and enters the world enters, then one should be wary, so one is isn't carried away or perhaps even goes crazy". Christian August later contributed significantly to the large collection of antiques in the Waldecker Arolsen Castle.

Like his father, the last commander of the Dutch army in the War of the Austrian Succession, Christian August also entered into the military service. In 1770 he was made a lieutenant colonel in the Austrian Dragoon Regiment No. 39 Karl August, Count Palatine of Zweibrücken-Birkenfeld. A year later he became commander of that unit. He fought as a volunteer on the Russian side in the Russo-Turkish War (1768-1774) against the Ottoman Empire. In 1773 he returned with the rank of colonel back to his Austrian regiment, and the Emperor appointed him to be its keeper. Henceforth it was called Dragoon Regiment No. 39 Prince Waldeck. In 1781, he published his Kleine Berichtigungen über Versuch einer Geschichte des bayerischen Erbfolgekrieges ("Small corrections to an attempt to describe the history of the Bavarian War of Succession"). In the Russo-Turkish War (1787-1792), he served under Field Marshal Ernst Gideon von Laudon. He won some battles and was promoted to lieutenant field marshal.

As such, Christian August of Waldeck commanded a division against the French troops at the beginning of the War of the First Coalition in 1792. He was wounded while exploring the fortress Thionville and lost his left arm.

He was summoned to Vienna and was commissioned by Emperor Francis II to write a plan of operations for the joint Austro-Prussian army in the Rhineland, which was however not accepted by Prussia. After painstaking negotiations, he succeeded to persuade the Prussian king to start an offensive in the Alsace. Christian August of Waldeck was in command of an Austrian corps, part of an army commanded by General Dagobert Sigmund von Wurmser. At the conquest of Wissembourg, he commanded the first column to attack. With his troops he crossed the Rhine at Selz on 13 October 1793 and attacked the French defenders in the back while general Wurmser opened frontal attack on the enemy at Wissembourg. Waldeck thus contributed to the decisive victory at Wissembourg. He also distinguished himself in subsequent battles. When general Wurmser retired in 1794, Christian August took command of the Austrian Army on the Rhine, until he had to hand over command to Imperial Count Johann Georg von Browne. He was awarded the Commander's Cross of the Military Order of Maria Theresa for his achievements at Wissembourg and promoted to general of cavalry.

In 1794, he succeeded Karl Mack von Leiberich as quartermaster general of the Austrian army in the Austrian Netherlands under Prince Josias of Saxe-Coburg-Saalfeld. A short time later he became a member of the War Council in Vienna. In 1796, he received the general command over Bohemia.

In 1797 he was asked to take over command of the Land Army of Portugal. With the consent of the Emperor, he took on this job. However, he was unable to reorganize the army, because some influential personalities opposed his plan. He died soon afterwards on 24 September 1798 of "dropsy of the chest".

Christian August von Waldeck-Pyrmont was buried in the British Cemetery in Lisbon on 28 September 1798. The king of Portugal himself donated a tomb monument in the form of a marble pyramid.

== Ancestry ==
Ancestors of Christian August, Prince of Waldeck and Pyrmont

16. Philip VII, Count of Waldeck
8. Christian Louis, Count of Waldeck
17. Countess Anna Katharina of Sayn-Wittgenstein
4. Friedrich Anton Ulrich, Prince of Waldeck and Pyrmont
18. Georg Friedrich, Count of Rappoltstein
9. Countess Anna Elisabeth of Rappoltstein
19. Countess Elisabeth Charlotte of Solms-Sonnenwalde
2. Karl August, Prince of Waldeck and Pyrmont
20. Christian I, Count Palatine of Birkenfeld-Bischweiler
10. Christian II, Count Palatine of Zweibrücken-Birkenfeld
21. Countess Palatine Magdalene Catherine of Zweibrücken
5. Countess Palatine Louise of Zweibrücken-Birkenfeld
22. Count Johann Jakob of Rappoltstein
11. Countess Catharine Agathe of Rappoltstein
23. Countess Anna Claudia of Salm-Kyrburg, Wild- & Rheingräfin
1. Christian August, Prince of Waldeck and Pyrmont
24. Christian I, Count Palatine of Birkenfeld-Bischweiler (= 20)
12. Christian II, Count Palatine of Zweibrücken-Birkenfeld (= 10)
25. Countess Palatine Magdalene Catharine of Zweibrücken (= 21)
6. Christian III, Count Palatine of Zweibrücken
26. Count Johann Jakob of Rappoltstein (= 22)
13. Countess Catharine Agathe of Rappoltstein (= 11)
27. Countess Anna Claudia of Salm-Kyrburg, Wild- & Rheingräfin (= 23)
3. Countess Palatine Christiane Henriette of Zweibrücken-Birkenfeld
28. Count Gustav Adolph, Count of Nassau-Saarbrücken
14. Louis Crato, Count of Nassau-Saarbrücken
29. Countess Eleonora Clara of Hohenlohe
7. Countess Caroline of Nassau-Saarbrücken
30. Henry Frederick, Count of Hohenlohe-Langenburg
15. Countess Philippine Henriette of Hohenlohe-Langenburg
31. Countess Juliane Dorothea of Castell-Remlingen

== References and sources ==
- Louis Curtze: Geschichte und Beschreibung des Fürstentums Waldeck. Arolsen, 1850 p. 620 ff (Digitized)
- Julian Pallua-Gall (1896). "Waldeck, Christian August Prinz zu" . Allgemeine Deutsche Biographie (in German). Vol. 40. Leipzig: Duncker & Humblot. pp. 675–676.
