= George I of Waldeck and Pyrmont =

George I
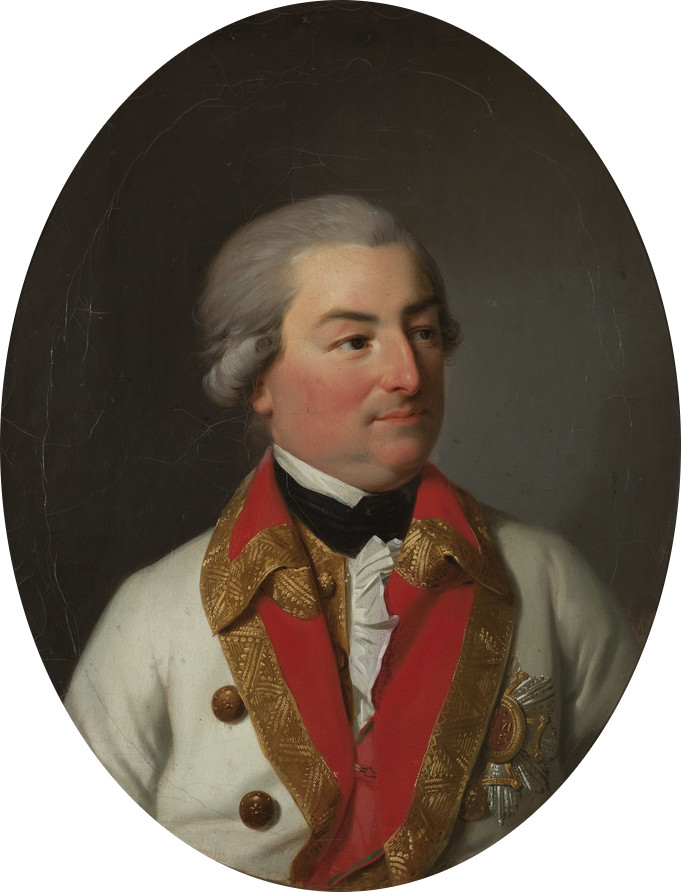
- Portrait, 1786

Prince of Waldeck and Pyrmont
- Reign: 24 September 1812 – 9 September 1813
- Predecessor: Friedrich Karl August
- Successor: George II
- Born: 6 May 1747; Arolsen, Waldeck
- Died: 9 September 1813 (aged 66); Rhoden, Principality of Waldeck and Pyrmont
- Spouse: Princess Augusta of Schwarzburg-Sondershausen (m. 1784)
- Issue Detail: Princess Christiane; Prince Karl, Hereditary Prince of Waldeck and Pyrmont; George II, Prince of Waldeck and Pyrmont; Prince Friedrich; Prince Christian; Princess Augusta; Prince Johann; Ida, Princess of Schaumburg-Lippe; Prince Wolrad; Mathilde, Duchess Eugen of Württemberg; Prince Karl Christian; Princess Karoline; Prince Hermann
- House: House of Waldeck and Pyrmont
- Father: Karl August, Prince of Waldeck and Pyrmont
- Mother: Countess Palatine Christiane Henriette of Zweibrücken-Birkenfeld

George I (German: Georg Fürst zu Waldeck und Pyrmont; 6 May 1747 – 9 September 1813) was Prince of Waldeck and Pyrmont from 1812 to 1813.

== Life ==
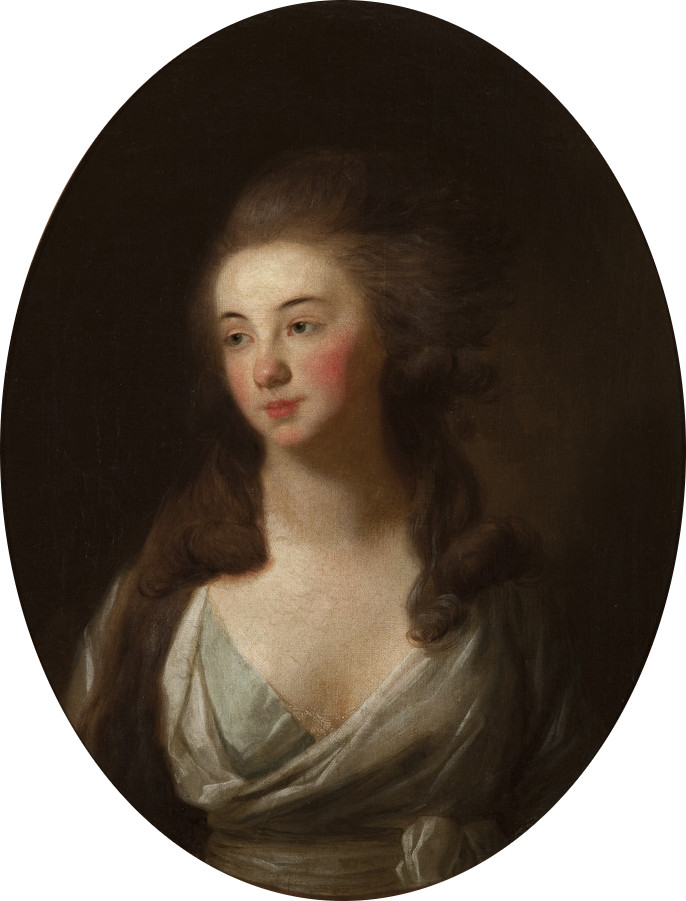
George's wife: Princess Augusta of Schwarzburg-Sondershausen, painted by Johann Friedrich August Tischbein (1786)

George was born on May 6, 1747. He was the son of Karl August, Prince of Waldeck and Pyrmont and Countess Palatine Christiane Henriette of Zweibrücken-Birkenfeld. Like his brother Friedrich, he was also educated in Switzerland.

Prince George was appointed Oberst (colonel) of the Austrian Stain Infantry Regiment Nr. 50 in 1778, replacing Max Browne. His successor Franz von Werneck assumed command of the regiment in 1784. George was promoted to Generalmajor on 10 April 1783.

After George got married in 1784, he lived in Switzerland, but later moved to Rhoden, whereupon his brother ceded the county of Pyrmont to him on October 25, 1805, which he ruled independently from then as Prince of Pyrmont, being there at the same time in 1806 resided until he became Prince of Waldeck after his brother Friedrich died on September 24, 1812. He was well received by Emperor Napoleon, with whom he met in Warsaw along with his brother Friedrich.

George valued arts and sciences and founded a coin collection, which is said to be particularly outstanding for its ancient Greek coins.

== Prince of Waldeck and Pyrmont ==
The principality was divided 1805, Pyrmont was given to George, and his brother Friedrich Karl August stayed with Waldeck. In 1807, Waldeck joined the Confederation of the Rhine.

After the death of his brother in 1812, he took over the government in Waldeck.

== Marriage and children ==
He married Princess Augusta of Schwarzburg-Sondershausen (1 February 1768 – 26 December 1849), daughter of August II, Prince of Schwarzburg-Sondershausen and his wife, Princess Christine of Anhalt-Bernburg, in Otterwisch on 12 September 1784. They had:

- Princess Christiane of Waldeck and Pyrmont (23 March 1787 – 16 March 1806)
- Prince Karl of Waldeck and Pyrmont (7 July 1788 – 3 October 1795)
- George II (20 September 1789 – 15 May 1845), married Princess Emma of Anhalt-Bernburg-Schaumburg-Hoym, had issue
- Prince Friedrich of Waldeck and Pyrmont (3 November 1790 – 1 February 1828), married Ursula Polle, created Countess of Waldeck, had issue who held the title Count/Countess von Waldeck.
- Prince Christian of Waldeck and Pyrmont (19 June 1792 – 8 July 1795)
- Princess Augusta of Waldeck and Pyrmont (7 August 1793 – 29 April 1794)
- Prince Johann of Waldeck and Pyrmont (25 September 1794 – 8 October 1814)
- Princess Ida of Waldeck and Pyrmont (26 September 1796 – 12 April 1869), married George William, Prince of Schaumburg-Lippe, had issue.
- Prince Wolrad of Waldeck and Pyrmont (23 April 1798 – 24 August 1821)
- Princess Mathilde of Waldeck and Pyrmont (10 Apr 1801 – 13 Apr 1825), married Duke Eugen of Württemberg, had issue.
- Prince Karl Christian of Waldeck and Pyrmont (12 April 1803 – 19 Jul 1846), married Countess Amalie of Lippe-Biesterfeld, had issue.
- Princess Karoline Christiane of Waldeck and Pyrmont (17 November 1804 – 3 March 1806)
- Prince Hermann of Waldeck and Pyrmont (12 October 1809 – 6 October 1876), married Countess Agnes Teleki de Szék, no issue.

== Death ==
George died on 9 September 1813 in Rhoden. His wife Augusta lived as a widow in Arolsen Castle. She died on 26 December 1849 aged 81, and was buried in Rhoden at Schloss Rhoden alongside her husband.

== Ancestry ==
Ancestors of George I of Waldeck and Pyrmont

8. Christian Louis, Count of Waldeck
4. Friedrich Anton Ulrich, Prince of Waldeck and Pyrmont
9. Countess Anna Elisabeth of Rappoltstein
2. Karl August, Prince of Waldeck and Pyrmont
10. Christian II, Count Palatine of Zweibrücken-Birkenfeld
5. Countess Palatine Louise of Zweibrücken-Birkenfeld
11. Countess Catharine Agathe of Rappoltstein
1. George I, Prince of Waldeck and Pyrmont
12. Christian II, Count Palatine of Zweibrücken-Birkenfeld (= 10)
6. Christian III, Count Palatine of Zweibrücken
13. Countess Catharine Agathe of Rappoltstein (= 11)
3. Countess Palatine Christiane Henriette of Zweibrücken-Birkenfeld
14. Louis Crato, Count of Nassau-Saarbrücken
7. Countess Caroline of Nassau-Saarbrücken
15. Countess Philippine Henriette of Hohenlohe-Langenburg

== Notes and sources ==
George I of Waldeck and Pyrmont House of Waldeck and Pyrmont Cadet branch of the House of Waldeck Born: 6 May 1747 Died: 9 September 1813
Regnal titles
Preceded by Friedrich Karl August	Prince of Waldeck and Pyrmont; 24 September 1812 – 9 September 1813	Succeeded by George II
Military offices
Preceded by Max Browne	Oberst of Infantry Regiment Nr. 50; 1778–1784	Succeeded by Franz von Werneck
