= Princess Ida of Waldeck and Pyrmont =

Princess Ida
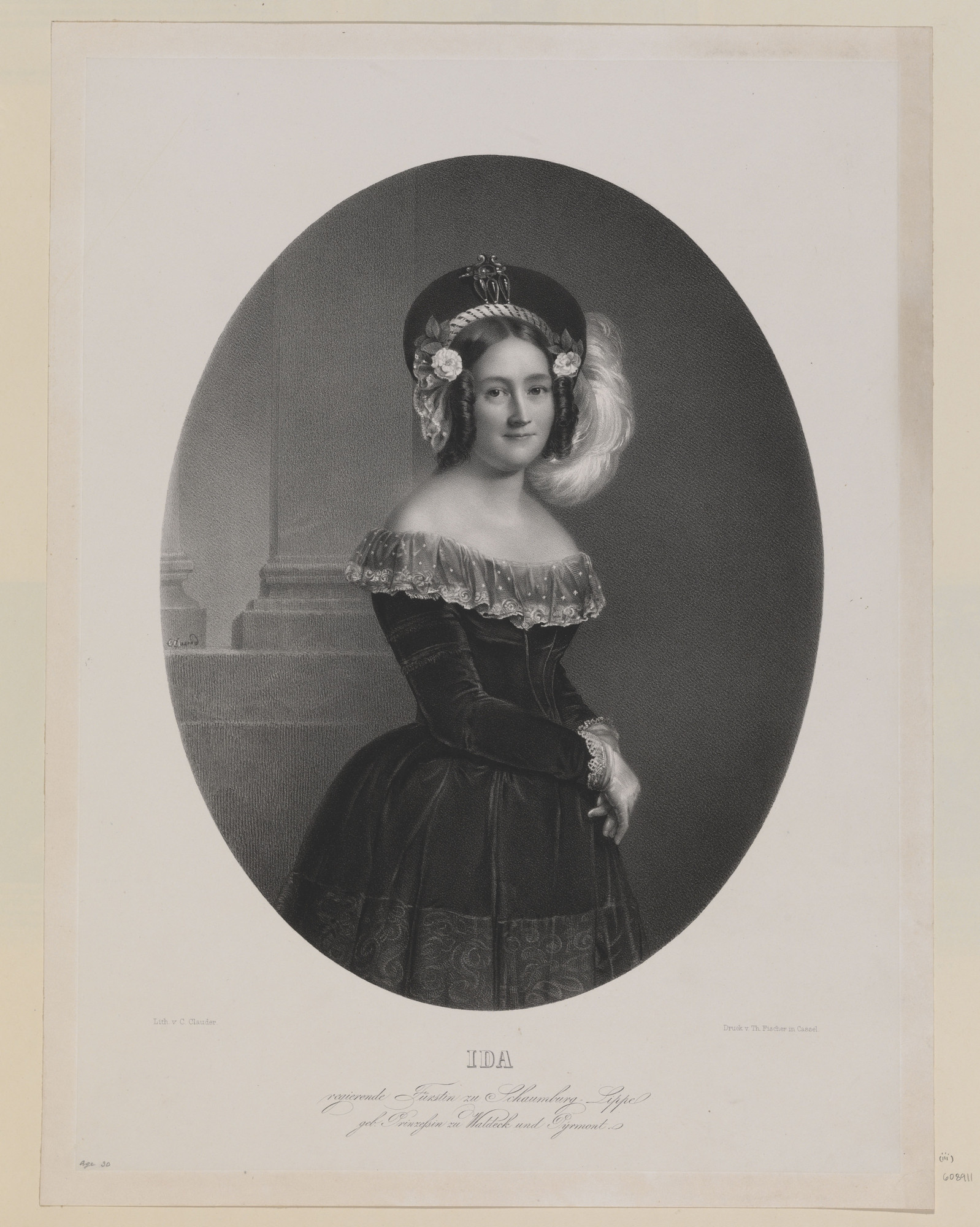

Princess consort of Schaumburg-Lippe
- Tenure: 23 June 1816 – 21 November 1860
- Born: 26 September 1796; Rhoden, Waldeck and Pyrmont, Holy Roman Empire
- Died: 12 April 1869 (aged 72); Menton, Alpes-Maritimes, France
- Spouse: George William, Prince of Schaumburg-Lippe (m. 1816; died 1860)
- Issue: Adolf I Mathilde, Duchess Eugen of Württemberg; Adelheid, Duchess of Schleswig-Holstein-Sonderburg-Glücksburg; Prince Ernst; Princess Ida; Princess Emma; Prince William; Prince Hermann; Elisabeth, Princess Wilhelm of Hanau
Names
- German: Ida Caroline Luise
- House: House of Waldeck-Pyrmont (by birth); House of Lippe (by marriage)
- Father: George I, Prince of Waldeck and Pyrmont
- Mother: Princess Augusta of Schwarzburg-Sondershausen

Princess Ida Caroline of Waldeck and Pyrmont (German: Ida Caroline Prinzessin zu Waldeck und Pyrmont; 26 September 1796 – 12 April 1869) was a member of the House of Waldeck and Pyrmont and a Princess of Waldeck and Pyrmont.

Through her marriage to George William, Prince of Schaumburg-Lippe, Ida was also a member of the House of Lippe and Princess consort of Schaumburg-Lippe.

== Early life ==
Ida was born in Rhoden, Principality of Waldeck and Pyrmont, and was the second-eldest child and eldest daughter of George I, Prince of Waldeck and Pyrmont and his wife, Princess Augusta of Schwarzburg-Sondershausen.

== Marriage and issue ==
Ida married George William, Prince of Schaumburg-Lippe, son of Philip II Ernest, Count of Schaumburg-Lippe, and his second wife, Landgravine Juliane of Hesse-Philippsthal, on 23 June 1816 in Arolsen, Principality of Waldeck and Pyrmont.

They had nine children:

- Adolphus I, Prince of Schaumburg-Lippe (1 August 1817 – 8 May 1893), married his cousin, Princess Hermine of Waldeck and Pyrmont (1827–1910)
- Princess Mathilde of Schaumburg-Lippe (11 September 1818 – 14 August 1891) married Duke Eugen of Württemberg (1820–1875)
- Princess Adelheid, Duchess of Schleswig-Holstein-Sonderburg-Glücksburg (9 March 1821 – 30 July 1899)
- Prince Ernst of Schaumburg-Lippe (12 December 1822 – 2 April 1831), died in childhood
- Princess Ida of Schaumburg-Lippe (26 May 1824 – 5 March 1894), unmarried
- Princess Emma of Schaumburg-Lippe (24 December 1827 – 23 January 1828), died in infancy
- Prince William of Schaumburg-Lippe (12 December 1834 – 4 April 1906); married Princess Bathildis of Anhalt-Dessau.
- Prince Hermann of Schaumburg-Lippe (31 October 1839 – 23 December 1839), died just two months after his birth
- Princess Elisabeth of Schaumburg-Lippe (5 March 1841 – 30 November 1926); married Prince Wilhelm of Hanau and Horowitz, a morganatic son of Frederick William, Elector of Hesse, and his second wife, Gertrude von Hanau.

== Death ==
Princess Ida died on 12 April 1869 in Menton, Alpes-Maritimes, France, aged 72, outliving her husband by 9 years.

Her body was buried, alongside George William, in the Schaumburg-Lippe family mausoleum in Stadthagen, Schaumburg, Germany.

== Ancestry ==
Ancestors of Princess Ida of Waldeck and Pyrmont

8. Friedrich Anton Ulrich, Prince of Waldeck and Pyrmont
4. Karl August, Prince of Waldeck and Pyrmont
9. Countess Palatine Louise of Birkenfeld-Bichweiler
2. George I, Prince of Waldeck and Pyrmont
10. Christian III, Count Palatine of Zweibrücken
5. Countess Palatine Christiane Henriette of Zweibrücken-Birkenfeld
11. Countess Caroline of Nassau-Saarbrücken
1. Princess Ida of Waldeck and Pyrmont
12. August I, Prince of Schwarzburg-Sondershausen
6. August II, Prince of Schwarzburg-Sondershausen
13. Princess Charlotte Sophie of Anhalt-Bernburg
3. Princess Augusta of Schwarzburg-Sondershausen
14. Victor Frederick, Prince of Anhalt-Bernburg
7. Princess Christine of Anhalt-Bernburg
15. Margravine Albertine of Brandenburg-Schwedt

Princess Ida of Waldeck and Pyrmont House of Waldeck Born: 26 September 1796 Died: 12 April 1869
German royalty
Preceded by Princess Juliane of Hesse-Philippsthal	Princess consort of Schaumburg-Lippe; 23 June 1816 – 21 November 1860	Succeeded by Princess Hermine of Waldeck and Pyrmont
