= Prince Adolf of Schaumburg-Lippe =

- Regent of Lippe
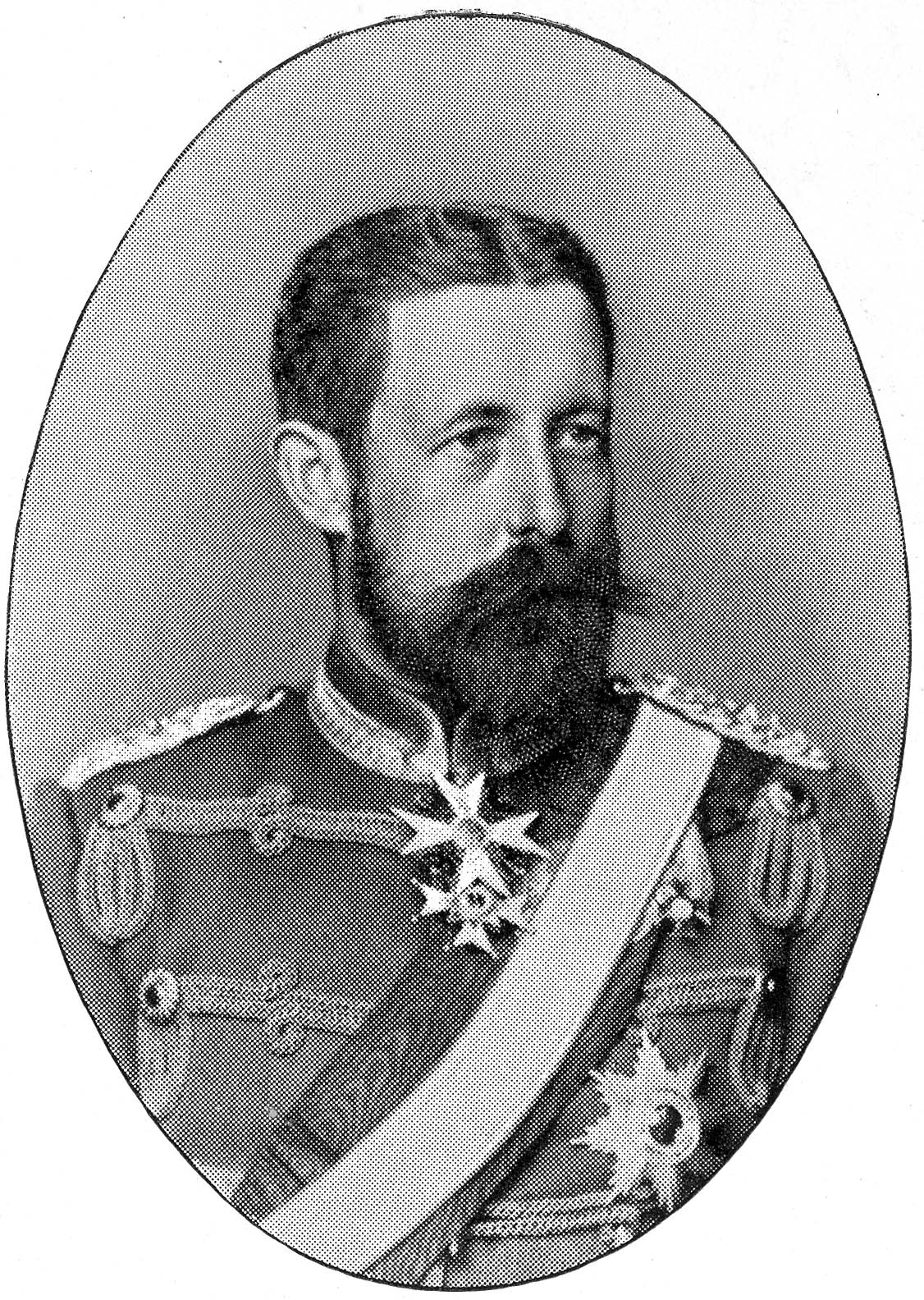

Regent of Lippe
- Reign: 1895–1897; As Regent of Lippe
- Predecessor: New position
- Successor: Count Ernst
- Born: 20 July 1859; Schloss Bückeburg, Bückeburg, Schaumburg-Lippe
- Died: 9 July 1916 (aged 56); Bonn, German Empire
- Burial: 16 July 1916; Buckeburg, Schaumburg-Lippe
- Spouse: Princess Viktoria of Prussia (m. 1890)
- House: House of Lippe
- Father: Adolf I, Prince of Schaumburg-Lippe
- Mother: Princess Hermine of Waldeck and Pyrmont

Prince Adolf of Schaumburg-Lippe (German: Adolf Wilhelm Viktor; 20 July 1859 – 9 July 1916) was a German prince of the House of Schaumburg-Lippe and a Prussian General of the Cavalry. He was regent of the Principality of Lippe from 1895 to 1897 due to the incapacity of his distant relative, Alexander, Prince of Lippe.

== Early life ==
Prince Adolf was born on 20 July 1859 at Bückeburg Palace (German: Schloss Bückeburg) in Bückeburg, the capital of the small Principality of Schaumburg-Lippe in central Germany, during the reign of his paternal grandfather, George William, Prince of Schaumburg-Lippe. He was the seventh child and fourth son of Adolf, Hereditary Prince of Schaumburg-Lippe (1817–1893) and Princess Hermine of Waldeck and Pyrmont (1827–1910), a daughter of George II, Prince of Waldeck and Pyrmont.

On 21 November 1860, Adolf's father succeeded as Prince of Schaumburg-Lippe following the death of his own father, Prince George William. Prince Adolf was brought up with his siblings at Bückeburg Palace. From 1872 to 1874 he and his five years older brother, Prince Otto Heinrich, were educated by Hubert Maximilian Ermisch who would later become a wellknown archivist and historian.

== Regent of Lippe ==
Following the death of Prince Woldemar of Lippe on the 20 March 1895 and the ascension of Woldemar's brother Alexander, Adolf was appointed to act as regent of the Principality of Lippe due to Prince Alexander being unable to rule due to a mental illness. He continued to act as regent until 1897 when he was replaced by Count Ernst of Lippe-Biesterfeld.

== Marriage ==
In 1890 Prince Adolf met Princess Viktoria of Prussia during a visit to Marie, Princess of Wied, mother of Queen Elisabeth of Romania. They were married on the 19 November 1890 in Berlin. She was a daughter of the late Frederick III, German Emperor, and his widow, Empress Victoria. As such, Adolf was a brother-in-law to the last German Emperor, Wilhelm II, as well as a grandson-in-law of Queen Victoria of the United Kingdom. The wedding was attended by Kaiser Wilhelm, along with his wife, Empress Augusta Viktoria, and Victoria's mother, the dowager empress of Germany. Many of Princess Victoria's extended relatives also attended, including her aunt, Princess Christian of Schleswig-Holstein. After the ceremony, the couple held a banquet, at which Emperor Wilhelm feelingly assured the pair of "his protection and friendly care".

After a prolonged honeymoon to several countries, the couple settled in Bonn where they acquired Palais Schaumburg as their residence. The marriage remained childless, though Princess Viktoria had a miscarriage within the first few months of marriage.

The British courtier Alan Lascelles later told George V's biographer Harold Nicolson that he had thought Prince Adolf “the most physically repulsive man he had ever seen”.

== Orders and decorations ==
- Schaumburg-Lippe:
  - Service Cross
  - Silver Cross of Merit
  - Silver Merit Medal
- Lippe-Detmold: Cross of Honour of the House Order of Lippe, 1st Class
- Baden:
  - Knight of the House Order of Fidelity, 1893
  - Knight of the Order of Berthold the First, 1893
- (Saxe-Coburg and Gotha) (Duchy of Saxe-Altenburg) (Saxe-Meiningen) Ernestine duchies: Grand Cross of the Saxe-Ernestine House Order
- Oldenburg: Grand Cross of the Order of Duke Peter Friedrich Ludwig, with Golden Crown
- Kingdom of Prussia:
  - Service Award Cross
  - Knight of the Black Eagle, 17 November 1890; with Collar, 18 January 1892
  - Lifesaving Medal
- Reuss:
  - Cross of Merit, 1st Class
  - Cross of Honour, 1st Class (Reuss-Gera)
- Saxe-Weimar-Eisenach: Grand Cross of the White Falcon
- Waldeck and Pyrmont: Order of Merit, 1st Class
- Württemberg:
  - Grand Cross of the Württemberg Crown, 1886
  - Lifesaving Medal
- Ottoman Empire: Order of Osmanieh, 1st Class
- United Kingdom: Honorary Knight Grand Cross of the Bath (civil)

== Ancestry ==
Ancestors of Prince Adolf of Schaumburg-Lippe

16. Friedrich Ernst, Count of Lippe-Alverdissen
8. Philip II, Count of Schaumburg-Lippe
17. Elisabeth Philippine von Friesenhausen
4. George William, Prince of Schaumburg-Lippe
18. William, Landgrave of Hesse-Philippsthal
9. Landgravine Juliane of Hesse-Philippsthal
19. Landgravine Ulrike Eleonore of Hesse-Philippsthal-Barchfeld
2. Adolf I, Prince of Schaumburg-Lippe
20. Karl August, Prince of Waldeck and Pyrmont
10. George I, Prince of Waldeck and Pyrmont
21. Countess Palatine Christiane Henriette of Zweibrücken-Birkenfeld
5. Princess Ida of Waldeck and Pyrmont
22. Prince August of Schwarzburg-Sondershausen
11. Princess Augusta of Schwarzburg-Sondershausen
23. Princess Christine of Anhalt-Bernburg
1. Prince Adolf of Schaumburg-Lippe
24. Karl August, Prince of Waldeck and Pyrmont (=20)
12. George I, Prince of Waldeck and Pyrmont ( = 10)
25. Countess Palatine Christiane Henriette of Zweibrücken-Birkenfeld (=21)
6. George II, Prince of Waldeck and Pyrmont
26. Prince August of Schwarzburg-Sondershausen (=22)
13. Princess Augusta of Schwarzburg-Sondershausen (= 11)
27. Princess Christine of Anhalt-Bernburg (=23)
3. Princess Hermine of Waldeck and Pyrmont
28. Charles Louis, Prince of Anhalt-Bernburg-Schaumburg-Hoym
14. Victor II, Prince of Anhalt-Bernburg-Schaumburg-Hoym
29. Princess Amalie Eleonore of Solms-Braunfels
7. Princess Emma of Anhalt-Bernburg-Schaumburg-Hoym
30. Charles Christian, Prince of Nassau-Weilburg
15. Princess Amelie of Nassau-Weilburg
31. Princess Carolina of Orange-Nassau

== Book Cited ==
- Ridley, Jane (2021), Never A Dull Moment, London: Chatto & Windus, ISBN 0701188707 (a biography of George V)

Prince Adolf of Schaumburg-Lippe House of Lippe Born: 20 July 1859 Died: 9 July 1916
Regnal titles
New title	Regent of Lippe; 1895–1897	Succeeded by Count Ernst
