= Friedrich Karl August, Prince of Waldeck and Pyrmont =

Friedrich Karl August
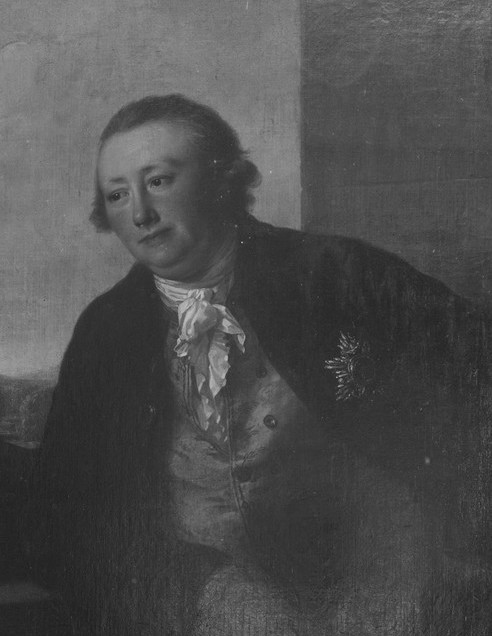

Prince of Waldeck and Pyrmont
- Reign: 29 August 1763 – 24 September 1812
- Predecessor: Karl August
- Successor: George I
- Born: 25 October 1743; Zweibrücken, Palatinate-Zweibrücken
- Died: 24 September 1812 (aged 68); Arolsen, Waldeck and Pyrmont
- House: House of Waldeck and Pyrmont
- Father: Karl August, Prince of Waldeck and Pyrmont
- Mother: Countess Palatine Christiane Henriette of Zweibrücken-Birkenfeld

Friedrich Karl August (German: Friedrich Karl August Fürst zu Waldeck und Pyrmont; 25 October 1743 – 24 September 1812) was Prince of Prince of Waldeck and Pyrmont from 1763 to 1812.

== Early life ==
He was the second son of Karl August, Prince of Waldeck and Pyrmont and Countess Palatine Christiane Henriette of Zweibrücken-Birkenfeld. He stayed on for one and a half years in Lausanne and made his Grand Tour through Italy and France.

== Military career ==
Like his father and his brother Christian, he entered into foreign military services. In 1757, he was Imperial lieutenant colonel. In 1766, he became Major General and in 1772 lieutenant-general of the Dutch army. Working for the Netherlands already were three battalions from Waldeck, which had set up his father. Which Friedrich Karl August in 1767 added a fourth battalion.

== Prince of Waldeck and Pyrmont ==
At the death of his father in 1763. In 1775, he went on a journey to England. In Waldeck, he undertook several modernization efforts. He promoted the construction of roads, agriculture and commerce. Like his parents and brothers, he was very fond of the sciences. He left a written history of the Seven Years' War, and some biographical sketches. He encouraged the publication of the memoirs of his father on the campaigns 1745-1747.

Friedrich Karl August rented Waldecker troops to Great Britain in 1775 to fight in the American Revolutionary War. Waldeck contributed 1,225 men to the war, and lost 720.

The principality was divided 1805, his brother George was given Pyrmont, and Friedrich Karl August stayed with Waldeck. In 1807, he joined with the Confederation of the Rhine and was given a seat in the College of Princes of the Federal Assembly.

After his death in 1812, his brother George took over the government in Waldeck.

== Ancestry ==
Ancestors of Friedrich Karl August, Prince of Waldeck and Pyrmont

16. Philipp VII, Count of Waldeck
8. Christian Ludwig, Count of Waldeck
17. Countess Anna Katharina of Sayn-Wittgenstein
4. Friedrich Anton Ulrich, Prince of Waldeck and Pyrmont
18. Georg Friedrich, Count of Rappoltstein
9. Countess Anna Elisabeth of Rappoltstein
19. Countess Elisabeth Charlotte of Solms-Sonnenwalde
2. Karl August, Prince of Waldeck and Pyrmont
20. Christian I, Count Palatine of Birkenfeld-Bischweiler
10. Christian II, Count Palatine of Zweibrücken-Birkenfeld
21. Countess Palatine Magdalene Catherine of Zweibrücken
5. Countess Palatine Louise of Zweibrücken-Birkenfeld
22. Count Johann Jakob of Rappoltstein
11. Countess Catharine Agathe of Rappoltstein
23. Countess Anna Claudia of Salm-Kyrburg, Wild- & Rheingräfin
1. Friedrich Karl August, Prince of Waldeck and Pyrmont
24. Christian I, Count Palatine of Birkenfeld-Bischweiler (= 20)
12. Christian II, Count Palatine of Zweibrücken-Birkenfeld (= 10)
25. Countess Palatine Magdalene Catharine of Zweibrücken (= 21)
6. Christian III, Count Palatine of Zweibrücken
26. Count Johann Jakob of Rappoltstein (= 22)
12. Countess Catharine Agathe of Rappoltstein (= 11)
27. Countess Anna Claudia of Salm-Kyrburg, Wild- & Rheingräfin (= 23)
3. Countess Palatine Christiane Henriette of Zweibrücken-Birkenfeld
28. Count Gustav Adolph, Count of Nassau-Saarbrücken
14. Louis Crato, Count of Nassau-Saarbrücken
29. Countess Eleonora Clara of Hohenlohe
7. Countess Caroline of Nassau-Saarbrücken
30. Henry Frederick, Count of Hohenlohe-Langenburg
15. Countess Philippine Henriette of Hohenlohe-Langenburg
31. Countess Juliane Dorothea of Castell-Remlingen

== Bibliography ==
- Menke, Karl Theodor (1840). Pyrmont und seine Umgebung (in German). Hameln, Pyrmont. p. 65.
- Curtze, L. (1850). Geschichte und Beschreibung des Fürstentums Waldeck (in German). Arolsen. pp. 619–620.
- Eelking, Max von (1893). The German Allied Troops in the North American War of Independence, 1776–1783. Translated from German by J. G. Rosengarten. Albany, NY: Joel Munsell's Sons. LCCN 72081186.

Friedrich Karl August, Prince of Waldeck and Pyrmont House of Waldeck and Pyrmont Born: 25 October 1743 24 September 1812
Regnal titles
Preceded by Karl August	Prince of Waldeck and Pyrmont; 29 August 1763 – 24 September 1812	Succeeded by George I
