= Countess Palatine Christiane Henriette of Zweibrücken-Birkenfeld =

Christiane Henriette
- Countess Palatine of Zweibrücken-Birkenfeld; Princess of Waldeck and Pyrmont
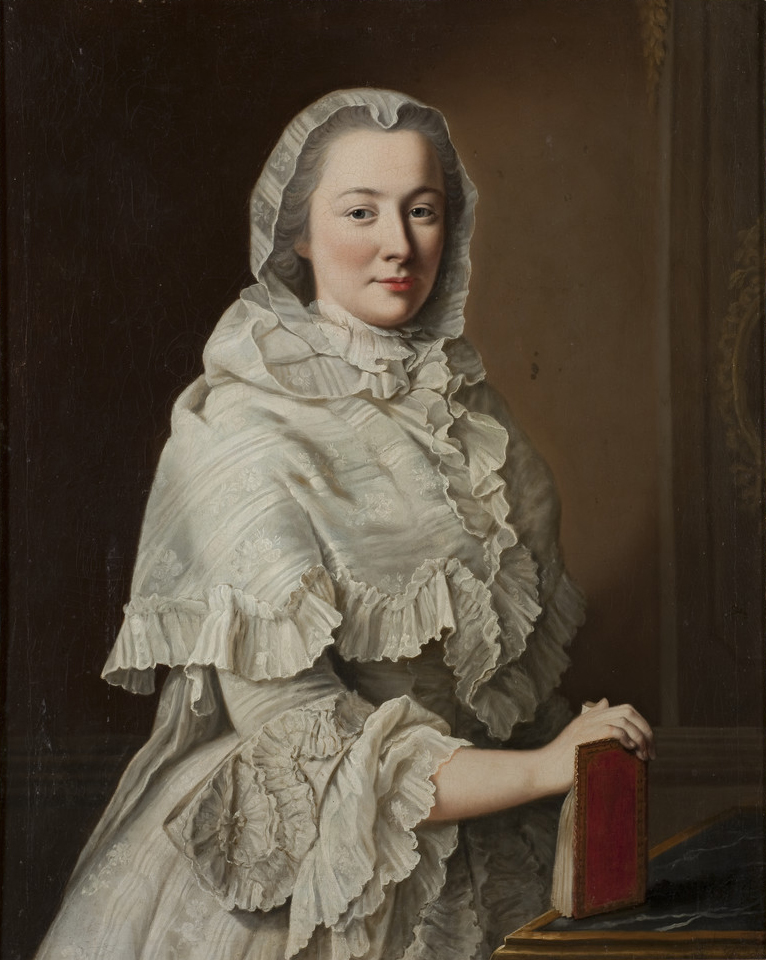
- Portrait by Johann Georg Ziesenis
- Born: 16 November 1725; Ribeauvillé
- Died: 11 February 1816 (aged 90); Arolsen Castle, Bad Arolsen, Hesse, German Confederation
- Spouse: Karl August, Prince of Waldeck and Pyrmont (m. 1741; died 1763)
- Issue Detail: Prince Charles, Hereditary Prince of Waldeck and Pyrmont; Friedrich Karl August, Prince of Waldeck and Pyrmont; Prince Christian August; George I, Prince of Waldeck and Pyrmont; Caroline, Duchess of Courland; Luise, Duchess of Nassau and Princess of Nassau-Usingen; Prince Louis
- House: Wittelsbach
- Father: Christian III, Count Palatine of Zweibrücken
- Mother: Caroline of Nassau-Saarbrücken

Christiane Henriette of Palatinate-Zweibrücken-Birkenfeld (16 November 1725, Ribeauvillé – 11 February 1816, Arolsen) was a Countess of Palatine of Zweibrücken-Birkenfeld by birth and by marriage a Princess of Waldeck-Pyrmont.

== Life ==
Christiane Henriette was the daughter of the Count Palatine and Duke Christian III of Zweibrücken (1674–1735) from his marriage to Caroline of Nassau-Saarbrücken (1704–1774), daughter of Louis Crato, Count of Nassau-Saarbrücken. Christiane Henriette was the sister of Christian IV, Count Palatine of Zweibrücken, the Great Landgravine, and Field Marshal Frederick Michael, Count Palatine of Zweibrücken. She was also an aunt of the first Bavarian king Maximilian I.

She married on 19 August 1741 in Zweibrücken, Karl August, Prince of Waldeck and Pyrmont (1704–1763). After the death of her husband in 1763, she was Regent of the principality and guardian for her first-born son from 1764 to 1766. In the years 1764 to 1778, the New Castle at Arolsen was built as her Wittum by Franz Friedrich Rothweil.

Christiane Henriette was considered highly educated in arts and sciences. She was a close friend of the anthropologist Johann Friedrich Blumenbach Christiane collected a comprehensive library, which by 1788 included about 6,000 volumes and in her Arolsen Castle, she maintained an art and natural history collection.

When she died, Christiane left behind a considerable debt, which is why parts of her library and art collection had to be auctioned off in 1820.

Christiane Henriette died in 1816 and was buried in the park of her New Castle at Arolsen.

== Offspring ==
From her marriage with Karl August, Christiane Henriette had the following children:

- Charles (1742–1756)
- Friedrich (1743–1812), Prince of Waldeck and Pyrmont
- Christian (1744–1798), Portuguese Field Marshal
- George I (1747–1813), Prince of Waldeck and Pyrmont

married in 1784 princess Auguste of Schwarzburg-Sondershausen (1768-1849)

- Caroline Louise (1748–1782)

married in 1765 (divorced 1772) Peter von Biron, Duke of Courland (1724-1800)

- Louise (1751–1816)

married in 1775 Duke Frederick Augustus of Nassau-Usingen (1738-1816)

- Louis (1752–1793), Dutch General, killed in battle

== Ancestry ==
Ancestors of Countess Palatine Christiane Henriette of Zweibrücken-Birkenfeld

8. Christian I, Count Palatine of Birkenfeld-Bischweiler
4. Christian II, Count Palatine of Zweibrücken-Birkenfeld
9. Countess Palatine Magdalene Catherine of Zweibrücken
2. Christian III, Count Palatine of Zweibrücken
10. Johann Jakob, Count of Rappoltstein
5. Countess Katharina Agathe of Rappoltstein
11. Wild- and Rhinegravine Anna Claudia of Salm-Kyrburg
1. Countess Palatine Christiane Henriette of Zweibrücken-Birkenfeld
12. Gustav Adolph, Count of Nassau-Saarbrücken
6. Louis Crato, Count of Nassau-Saarbrücken
13. Countess Eleonore Claire of Hohenlohe-Neuenstein
3. Caroline of Nassau-Saarbrücken
14. Henry Frederick, Count of Hohenlohe-Langenburg
7. Princess Philippine Henriette of Hohenlohe-Langenburg
15. Countess Juliana Dorothea of Castell-Remlingen
