= Princess Caroline of Waldeck and Pyrmont =

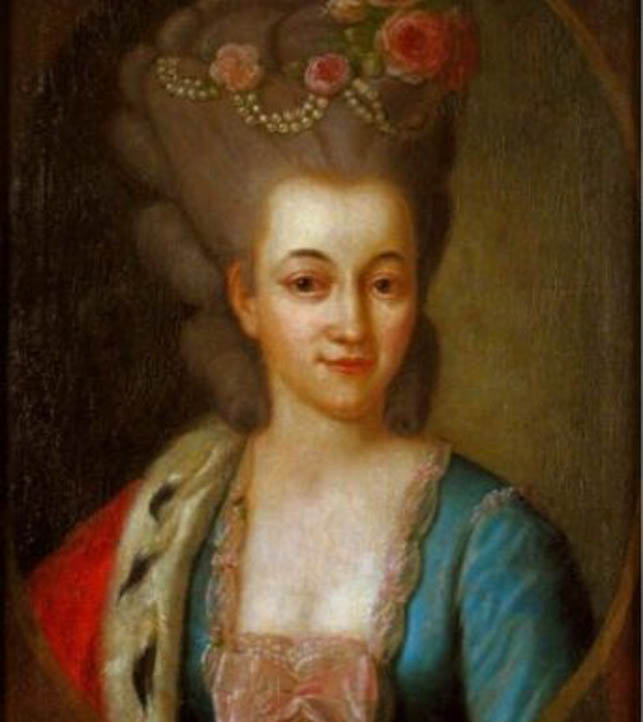

Duchess consort of Courland
- Tenure: 1769–1772
- Born: 14 August 1748
- Died: 18 August 1782 (aged 34)
- Spouse: Peter von Biron, Duke of Courland (m. 1765; div. 1772)
- Issue: Stillborn son
- House: House of Waldeck and Pyrmont (by birth); Biron (by marriage)
- Father: Karl August, Prince of Waldeck and Pyrmont
- Mother: Countess Palatine Christiane Henriette of Zweibrücken-Birkenfeld

Caroline Louise of Waldeck and Pyrmont (14 August 1748 – 18 August 1782), was a Princess of Waldeck and Pyrmont by birth and Duchess of Courland by marriage.

== Early life ==
Karoline Luise was born as the eldest daughter of Karl August, Prince of Waldeck and Pyrmont, and his wife Christiane Henriette, Countess Palatine of Zweibrücken-Birkenfeld-Bischweiler.

== Marriage and issue ==
She married the Peter von Biron, Duke of Courland, on 15 October 1765. The relationship between Caroline and Peter was unhappy, and evidently, he abused her while drunk. The union produced one son, who was stillborn on 16 November 1766. Caroline and Peter were divorced in 1772.

== Notes ==
Preceded by Benigna Gottlieb von Trotha gt Treyden	Duchess consort of Courland; 1769–1772	Succeeded by Eudoxia Borisovna Yusupova
