= Christian Louis, Count of Waldeck =

Count of Waldeck (1645-1706)

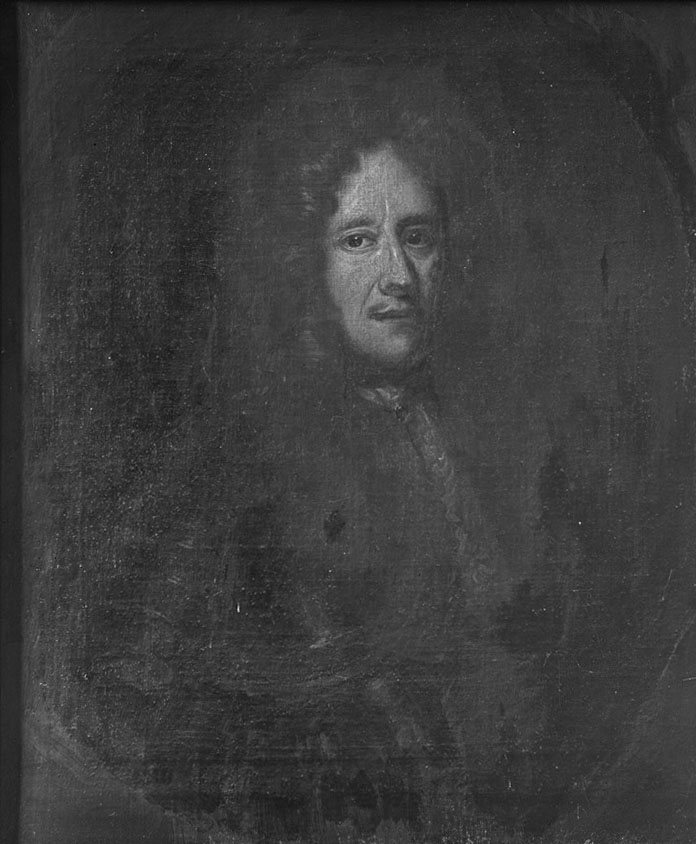
- Portrait of Christian Ludwig, Count of Waldeck (1680/1690)
- Born: 29 July 1635; Waldeck
- Died: 12 December 1706 (aged 71); Bad Arolsen
- Noble family: Waldeck
- Spouse: Anna Elizabeth of Rappoltstein
- Father: Philip VII, Count of Waldeck
- Mother: Anna Catherine of Sayn-Wittgenstein

Count Christian Louis of Waldeck (29 July 1635 – 12 December 1706) was from 1645 Count of Waldeck-Wildungen and from 1692 Count of Waldeck and Pyrmont.

== Life ==
He was born in Waldeck, the eldest son of the Count Philip VII of Waldeck-Wildungen (1613–1645) and his wife Anna Catherine of Sayn-Wittgenstein (1610–1690) and is the ancestor of all living Princes and Counts of Waldeck. The Arolsen princely house stems from his first marriage, while the Waldeck-Bergheim line, which resides in Bergheim near Bad Wildungen and died out in the male line in 1966, stems from his second marriage via his son Josias I.

After his father's death in 1645 Christian Louis inherited the county of Waldeck-Wildungen. His education and the regency until 1660 were in the hands of his mother and Henry Wolrad, a cousin of his father. Christian Louis later resided mostly at Christiansburg Castle, which he had built in Kleinern, near Wildungen.

On 12 June 1685, he closed an inheritance treaty with his cousin Count George Frederick of Waldeck-Eisenberg, which introduced the primogeniture in the house of Waldeck. When George Frederick died in 1692, Christian Louis inherited Waldeck-Eisenberg, thereby reuniting Waldeck in one hand for the first time since 1397. With Waldeck-Eisenberg, he also inherited the County of Pyrmont. In 1695, he moved his residence to Bad Arolsen and in 1696, he moved the county's Chancellary from Korbach to Mengeringhausen.

Christian Louis inherited a claim to a share of the County of Rappoltstein in the Alsace from his first wife. He could not enforce this claim, but he nevertheless added the arms of Rappoltstein to his coat of arms and he and his successors added "Count of Rappoltstein" to their titles.

Christian Louis was a successful soldier and rose to the rank of Field Marshal. He died in Bad Arolsen, aged 71.

During his reign, witch trials took place in Wildungen from 1650 to 1664, and again from 1660 to 1662. Witch hunts had happened before in Waldeck, from 1629 to 1632 under Count Christian I.

== Marriages and issue ==
Christian Louis married on 2 July 1658 with Countess Anna Elisabeth of Rappoltstein (1644-1676) (born: 7 March 1644; died: 6 December 1676). With her, he had the following children:

- Charlotte Elizabeth (born: 8 October 1659; died: 22 March 1660)
- Elisabeth Dorothea (born: 6 July 1661; died: 23 July 1702 in Brake), married on 17 December 1691 with Rudolf, Count of Lippe-Brake
- George Frederick (born: 21 June 1663; died: 28 April 1686)
- Henry Wolrad (born: 2 April 1665; died: 8 September 1688 in Negroponte)
- Charlotte Sophie (born: 18 January 1667; died: 6 September 1723 in Glaucha), married in 1707 with Johann Juncker (born: 23 December 1679, died: 25 October 1759 in Halle)
- Alexandrine Henrietta (born: 17 July 1668; died: 10 September 1668)
- Christiane Magdalene (born: 30 June 1669; died: 18 March 1699 in Hildburghausen), abbess of the Schaaken Abbey
- Elenore Catherine (born: 5 August 1670; died: 12 September 1717 in Minden).
- Eberhardine Louise (born: 9 August 1671; died: 19 September 1725)
- Frederick Charles Louis (born: 18 July 1672; died: 30 March 1694 in Hellevoetsluis)
- Philip Ernst (born: 26 August 1673; died: 27 June 1695)
- Charles (died: 1674)
- August William (born: 5 September 1675; died: 20 August 1676)
- Frederick Anton Ulrich (born: November 27, 1676; died: January 1, 1728), married 1700 Contess Palatine Louise of Zweibrücken-Birkenfeld (1678–1753), daughter of Christian II, Count Palatine of Zweibrücken-Birkenfeld
- Marie Henriette (born: 27 November 1676; died: July 8, 1678)

On 6 June 1680 in Nice, he married Countess Johannette of Nassau-Idstein (1657–1733), daughter of John, Count of Nassau-Idstein (1603–1677). With her, he had the following children:

- Ernest August (born: 11 October 1681; died: 15 November 1703, fell in the Battle of Speyerbach)
- Henry George (born: May 24, 1683; died: August 3, 1736 in Wildungen), married on 8 December 1712 with Countess Ulrika Eleonora of Dohna-Carwinden (born: April 3, 1689; died: October 6, 1760 in Bergheim), daughter of Frederick Christoph of Dohna-Carwinden (born: 7 January 1664; died: July 20, 1727)
- Christine Eleanor Louise (born: April 11, 1685; died: 8 February 1737 in Selbach), abbess of Schaaken
- Sophie Wilhelmine (born: June 6, 1686; died: August 23, 1749), abbess of Schaaken
- Charles Christian Louis (born: December 25, 1687; † September 16, 1734 in Quingentole (in Italy))
- Josias (born: August 29, 1689; died: November 7, 1693)
- John Wolrad (born: May 20, 1691; died: July 22, 1691)
- Henriette Albertine (born: 26 January 1695; died: December 7, 1699 in Arolsen)
- Josias I (born: August 20, 1696; died: February 2, 1763), married in January 1725 with Dorothea Sophia Solms-Rödelheim-Assenheim (1698–1774), daughter of Louis Henry of Solms-Rödelheim-Assenheim.
- Charlotte Florentine (born: 10 October 1697; died: 6 May 1777 in Fritzlar), abbess of Schaaken
- Frederick William (born: May 24, 1699; died: January 9, 1718)
