= Karl August, Prince of Waldeck and Pyrmont =

Prince of Waldeck and Pyrmont

Karl August
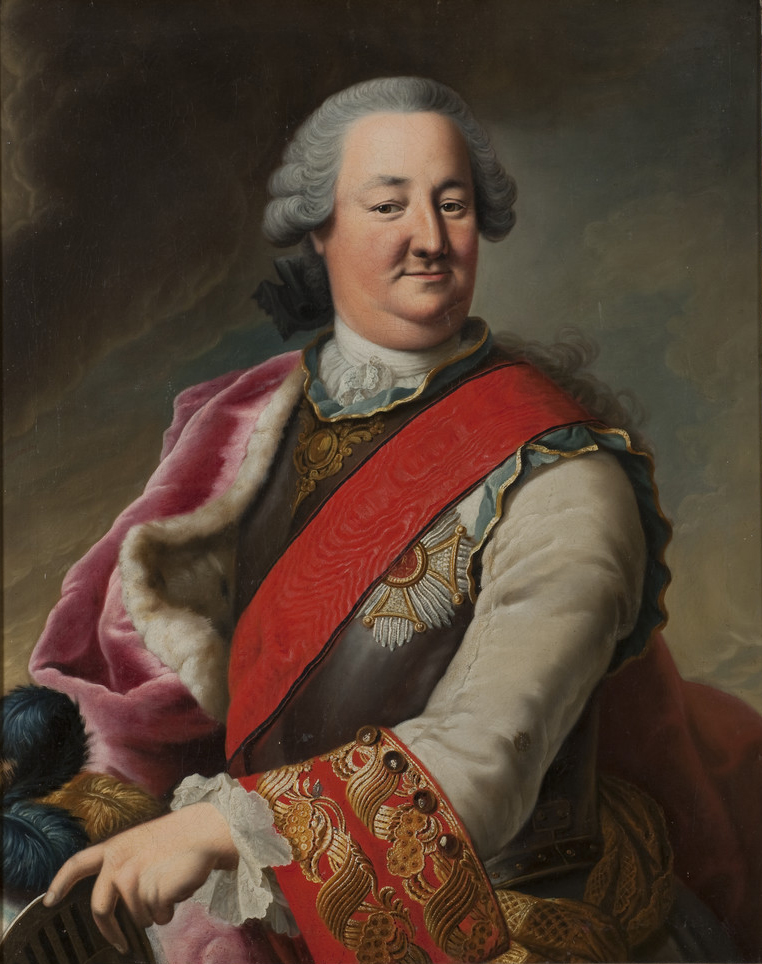
- Portrait by Johann Georg Ziesenis

Prince of Waldeck and Pyrmont
- Reign: 1 January 1728 – 29 August 1763
- Predecessor: Friedrich Anton Ulrich
- Successor: Friedrich Karl August
- Born: 24 September 1704; Hanau, Waldeck
- Died: 29 August 1763 (aged 58); Arolsen, Waldeck and Pyrmont
- Spouse: Countess Palatine Christiane Henriette of Zweibrücken-Birkenfeld (m. 1741)
- Issue Detail: Prince Charles, Hereditary Prince of Waldeck and Pyrmont; Friedrich Karl August, Prince of Waldeck and Pyrmont; Prince Christian August; George I, Prince of Waldeck and Pyrmont; Caroline, Duchess of Courland; Luise, Duchess of Nassau and Princess of Nassau-Usingen; Prince Louis
- House: House of Waldeck and Pyrmont
- Father: Friedrich Anton Ulrich, Prince of Waldeck and Pyrmont
- Mother: Countess Palatine Louise of Zweibrücken-Birkenfeld

Karl August Friedrich of Waldeck and Pyrmont (24 September 1704 – 29 August 1763) was Prince of Waldeck and Pyrmont and commander of the Dutch forces in the War of Austrian Succession.

== Royal life and military career ==
Karl was the second son of Friedrich Anton Ulrich, Prince of Waldeck and Pyrmont and Countess Palatine Louise of Zweibrücken-Birkenfeld, youngest child of Christian II, Count Palatine of Zweibrücken-Birkenfeld. In 1728 his father and his elder brother Christian Philip died, and so he became Prince of Waldeck and Pyrmont.

The Waldecks had a tradition of military service in the Dutch Army. Prince Georg Friedrich of Waldeck had already led the Dutch army in the War of the Grand Alliance. In the War of Austrian Succession, Karl was appointed as commander of the Dutch Army by the States-General of the Netherlands, as counterbalance to William IV, Prince of Orange, who relied completely on his brother-in-law the Duke of Cumberland. Waldeck was seen as an energetic and capable commander. Unfortunately, the coöperation between the Allied armies was severely lacking. Waldeck was present at the Battle of Fontenoy, where he led the attacks of the Dutch infantry on the French positions before the Allied commander, the Duke of Cumberland, would launch a massive attack on the French centre. Although having performed rather well at the battle, Waldeck and the infantry commander General baron Cronström were not pleased with the overall state of the troops and launched a series of improvements. He was also present at the Battle of Rocoux and the Battle of Lauffeld, all in which the Allies suffered defeat, although the Dutch troops performed much better. In 1746, Karl became Fieldmarshal of the Holy Roman Empire. In 1747, the French launched an attack on Bergen op Zoom; Waldeck wanted to come to the relief of the Allied garrison, but was severely hampered by the British and Austrians, who were ordered to spare no troops but rather stay in their positions to protect Maastricht. Frustrated, Waldeck left the army immediately and returned to his home without officially resigning his command.

== Marriage and children ==
In Zweibrücken, on 19 August 1741, Karl August married his first cousin Countess Palatine Christiane Henriette of Zweibrücken-Birkenfeld (1725–1816), daughter of Christian III, Count Palatine of Zweibrücken.

The couple had seven children:

- Prince Charles of Waldeck and Pyrmont (1742–1756)
- Friedrich Karl August, Prince of Waldeck and Pyrmont (1743–1812)
- Christian August, Prince of Waldeck and Pyrmont (1744–1798), a Field Marshal in the Portuguese army
- George I, Prince of Waldeck and Pyrmont (1747–1813); married Princess Augusta of Schwarzburg-Sondershausen
- Princess Caroline of Waldeck and Pyrmont (1748–1782), married Peter von Biron, last Duke of Courland and Semigallia
- Princess Luise of Waldeck and Pyrmont (1751–1816), married Frederick Augustus, Duke of Nassau
- Prince Louis of Waldeck and Pyrmont (1752–1793), killed in action near Kortrijk

Karl August, Prince of Waldeck and Pyrmont House of Waldeck and Pyrmont Cadet branch of the House of Waldeck Born: 24 September 1704 Died: 29 August 1763
Regnal titles
Preceded by Friedrich Anton Ulrich	Prince of Waldeck and Pyrmont; 1 January 1728 – 29 August 1763	Succeeded by Friedrich Karl August
