= Rhoden =

- Stadtteil of Osterwieck
- Interactive map of Rhoden
- Location within Germany Location within Saxony-Anhalt
- Coordinates: 52°0′54″N 10°39′23″E
- Country: Germany
- State: Saxony-Anhalt
- District: Harz
- Town: Osterwieck

Area
  - Total: 9.36 km^{2} (3.61 sq mi)
- Elevation: 125 m (410 ft)

Population (2006-12-31)
  - Total: 464
  - Density: 49.6/km^{2} (128/sq mi)
- Time zone: UTC+01:00 (CET)
  - Summer (DST): UTC+02:00 (CEST)
- Postal codes: 38835
- Dialling codes: 039421

Rhoden is a village and a former municipality in the district of Harz, in Saxony-Anhalt, Germany. Since 1 January 2010, it is part of the town Osterwieck.

== History ==
Rhoden was first mentioned in 1235 with Hugoldus de Roden. In 1302 the village is mentioned as Rode and in 1308 as Roden. The name means clearing, clearing site. Rhoden was laid out as a round village. The tithe to be paid by Rhoden to Halberstadt Abbey is already described in a document from 1242. The monastery granted fiefs in Rhoden to noble families, such as the von Berwinkel family, who owned an episcopal fief in the village from 1311.

Rhoden belonged to the diocese of Halberstadt until 1648 and then passed to the Principality of Halberstadt. The village was directly subordinate to the Hornburg office and in 1815 came under the administrative district of Magdeburg in the Prussian province of Saxony. In 1818, Rhoden had two aristocratic estates, 90 houses, 550 inhabitants, a church, a brickworks, a forester's lodge, an inn, a watermill and a windmill.

From 1961, the village was located directly in the border area of the GDR and could only be reached with a special permit. Rhoden is home to several listed historical buildings. These include the Hoym manor house (1670), the pigeon tower (17th century), the village inn (1554) and St. Vitus Church from the 12th century.

On January 1, 2010, the previously independent municipalities of Rhoden, Aue-Fallstein, Berßel, Bühne, Lüttgenrode, Schauen and Wülperode merged with the town of Osterwieck to form the new town of Osterwieck.
