= Arolsen Castle =

Schloss in Bad Arolsen, Hesse, Germany

Coordinates: 51.3808°N 9.02194°E

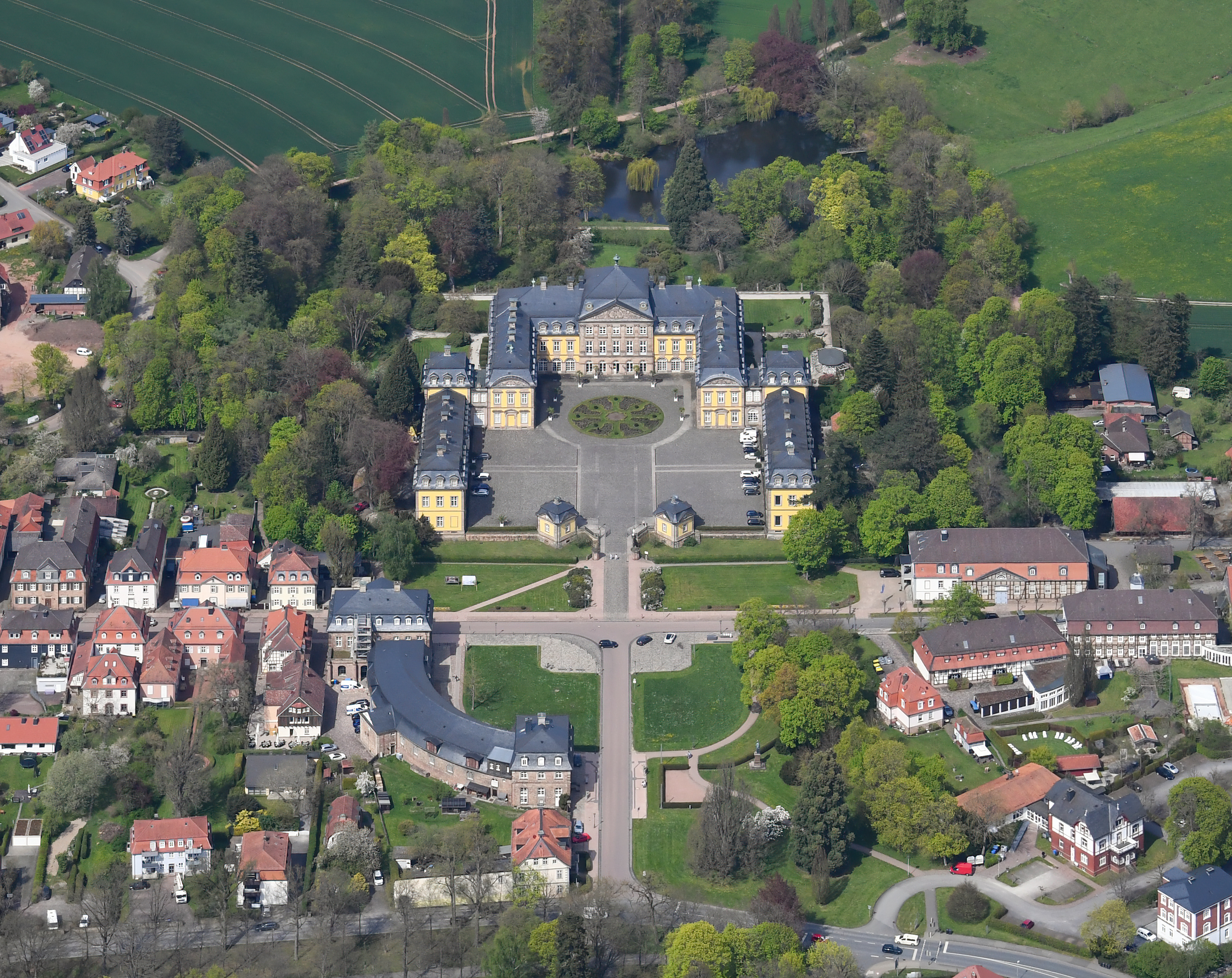
Aerial view of Arolsen Castle from the south

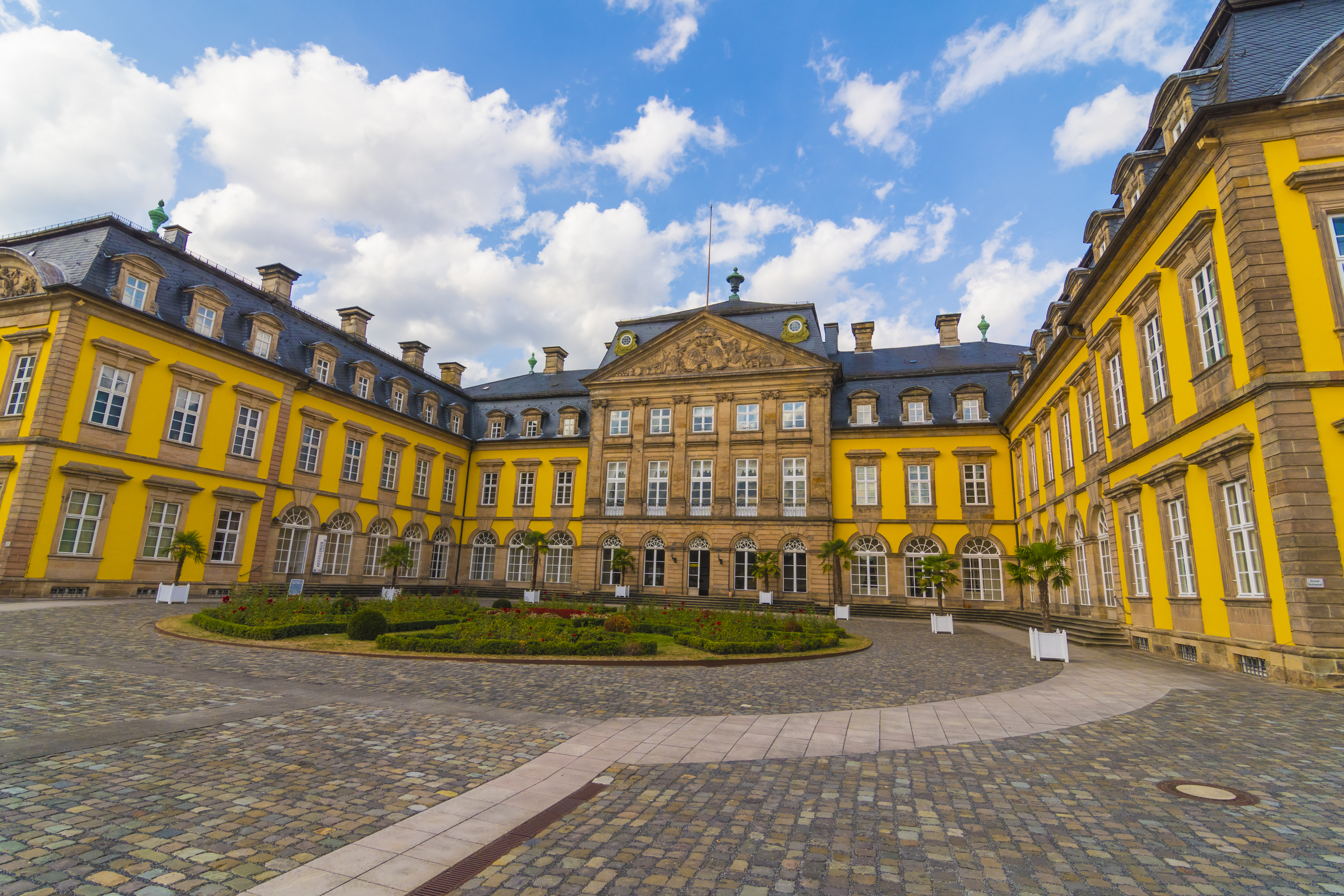
Courtyard of Arolsen Castle

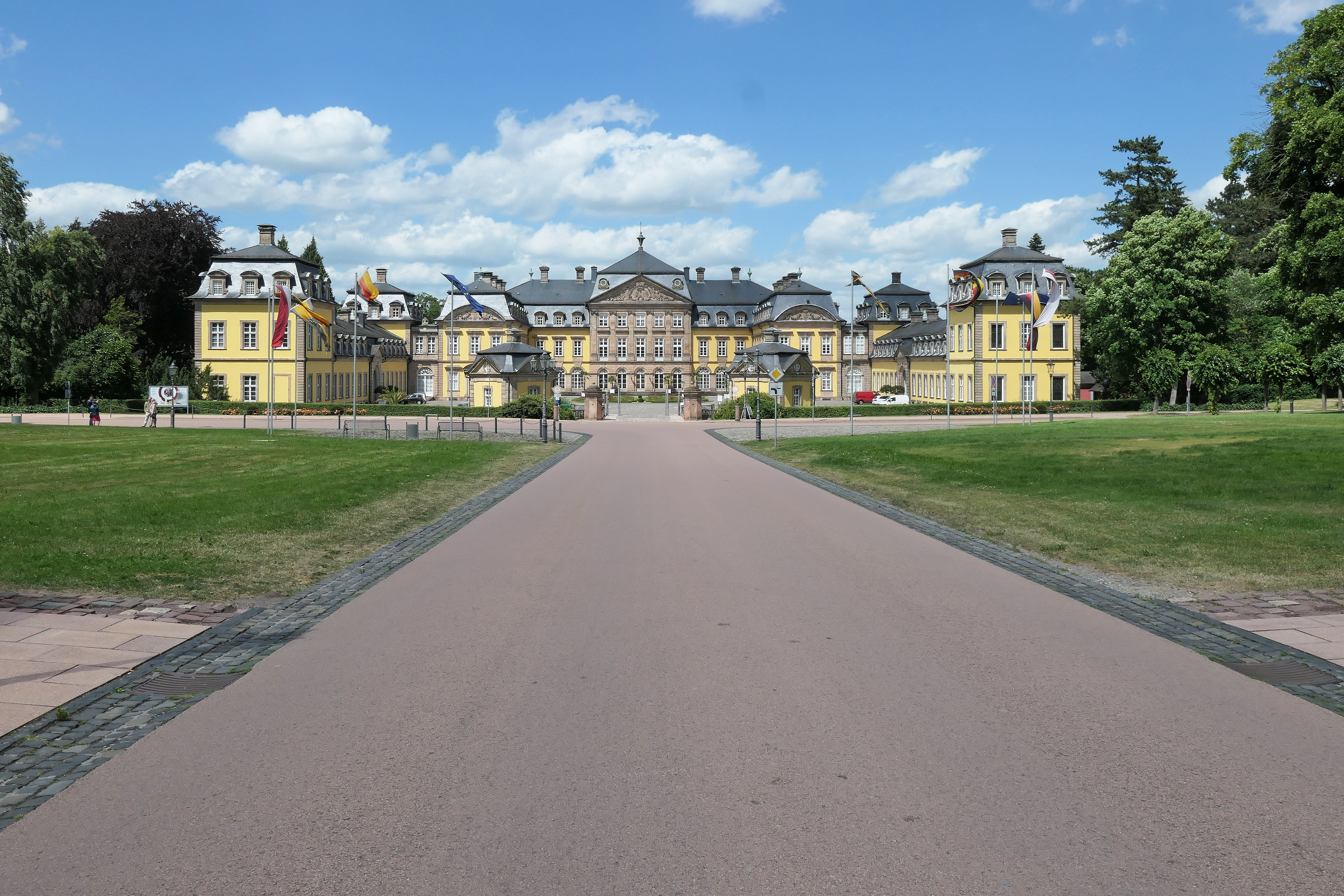
Arolsen Castle in 2018

Arolsen Castle (German: Residenzschloss Arolsen) is a baroque-style schloss in Bad Arolsen, Hesse, Germany. The castle is now a museum, and is still inhabited by Carl-Anton, Prince of Waldeck and Pyrmont, and his family.

As a result, it continues to serve as a residence of the former ruling family of the Principality of Waldeck and Pyrmont. It was the birthplace of Princess Emma of Waldeck and Pyrmont, who became the Queen consort of the Netherlands during the late 19th century.

== History ==
Built during the early 18th century, the castle's main building was completed in 1728. The furnishings, equipment, furniture, remained for several decades until the castle was finally handed over to its use.

Built in 1840, the Fürstlich Waldecksche Hofbibliothek (Princely Waldeck Court Library) today contains virtually all literature of the 18th century in relevant fields of knowledge. The collection focuses on the Universal geography, history, literature, and militaria.

In 1992, Jeff Koons created a 13-metre tall topiary sculpture called Puppy to be displayed at the castle's park.

== Arolsen Klebeband ==
The library is known for its "tape" books or "klebeband" books. These are blank books that could be filled with engravings that were popular among nobility. The Arolsen books are still intact, while many others have been disassembled in the past. These have been digitised by a society created specifically for this purpose.
