= Louis Crato, Count of Nassau-Saarbrücken =

Count of Nassau-Saarbrücken (1677–1713)

Louis Crato of Nassau-Saarbrücken
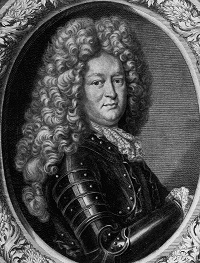
- Born: 28 March 1663; Saarbrücken
- Died: 14 February 1713 (aged 49); Saarbrücken
- Noble family: Nassau
- Spouse: Philippine Henriette of Hohenlohe-Langenburg
- Father: Gustav Adolph, Count of Nassau-Saarbrücken
- Mother: Clara Eleanor, Countess of Hohenlohe-Neuenstein

Louis Crato, Count of Nassau-Saarbrücken (German: Ludwig Kraft, Graf von Nassau-Saarbrücken; 28 March 1663 in Saarbrücken – 14 February 1713 in Saarbrücken) was a German aristocrat and soldier who succeeded his father as Count of Nassau-Saarbrücken.

== Early life ==
Louis was the son of Count Gustav Adolph of Nassau-Saarbrücken and Clara Eleanor, Countess of Hohenlohe-Neuenstein. He was educated at Neuenstein with his uncle, Count Wolfgang Julius of Hohenlohe-Neuenstein, and later in Tübingen. His father was at the time a prisoner of war in France.

== Career ==
On his father's death in 1677, he inherited the counties of Saarbrücken and Saarwerden. Due to his young age, his mother initially took over the state. In 1680 they were forced to recognize the supremacy of the French King Louis XIV and to swear an oath of fealty to him. Saarbrücken and Saar Werden were incorporated into the French kingdom as part of Louis XIV's so-called reunion policy and, shortly afterwards, became part of the Province de la Sarre, founded in c. 1684. Nevertheless, the old German rulers still retained a certain degree of political influence.

Likely due to the lack of opportunities, he entered the French army as a captain in 1682, but left in 1684 after his regiment was disbanded. After being declared of age in 1685, he briefly joined the army of William III of Orange, however, the French king ended it by threatening to confiscate his share of the revenues of his counties. As a result, Crato rejoined the French army. While he was in the military, his mother continued in the administration of his sovereignty. He soon acquired his own cavalry regiment, first the Nassau Regiment (previously called Dumont), then the Royal German Cavalry Regiment, and after a few years achieved Lieutenant-General.

During his career, he was distinguished by bravery, coolness and military acumen. He took part in the siege of Luxembourg in 1684. During the Nine Years' War he served in the Netherlands Company at the Battle of Fleurus (1690) (severely wounded), the siege of Namur, the Battle of Steenkerke (1692), and the Battle of Neerwinden (1693). The French King rewarded this short spell with the Dutch army by seizing his lands. After the Treaty of Ryswick in 1697, his lands were returned to him and he became Regent. During the War of the Spanish Succession he only served in an advisory role.

He was considered a good ruler, as he could keep his country out of further wars. He organized the administration of justice and the state finances. He showed benevolence and reorganized the school system.

== Personal life ==
On 25 April 1699 he married Countess Philippine Henriette of Hohenlohe-Langenburg (1679–1751), daughter of Count Henry Frederick of Hohenlohe-Langenburg. They had the following children:

- Eliza von Nassau-Saarbrücken (1700–1712), who died young.
- Eleonora Dorothea von Nassau-Saarbrücken (1701–1702), who died young.
- Henriette von Nassau-Saarbrücken (1702–1769)
- Caroline von Nassau-Saarbrücken (1704–1774), who married Count Palatine Christian III of Zweibrücken-Birkenfeld
- Louise Henriette von Nassau-Saarbrücken (1705–1766), who married Prince Frederick Charles of Stolberg-Gedern
- Eleonore von Nassau-Saarbrücken (1707–1769), who married Count Louis of Hohenlohe-Langenburg
- Louis von Nassau-Saarbrücken (1709–1710), who died young.
- Christina von Nassau-Saarbrücken (1711–1712), who died young.

Louis died on 14 February 1713 in Saarbrücken. As he had no surviving male issue, he was succeeded in government by his brother Charles Louis.

Louis Crato, Count of Nassau-Saarbrücken House of Nassau Born: 28 March 1663 Died: 14 February 1713
Preceded by Gustav Adolph	Count of Nassau-Saarbrücken; 1677–1713	Succeeded by Charles Louis
