= Friedrich Anton Ulrich, Prince of Waldeck and Pyrmont =

Friedrich Anton Ulrich
- Prince of Waldeck and Pyrmont
- Portrait c. 1725

Count/Prince of Waldeck and Pyrmont
- Reign: 12 December 1706 – 1 January 1728
- Predecessor: New Creation
- Successor: Karl August
- Born: 27 November 1676; Waldeck, Waldeck
- Died: 1 January 1728 (aged 51); Arolsen, Waldeck and Pyrmont
- Spouse: Countess Palatine Louise of Zweibrücken-Birkenfeld
- Issue: Prince Christian; Princess Friederike; Princess Henriette; Karl August, Prince of Waldeck and Pyrmont; Princess Ernestine; Prince Louis; Prince Johann; Princess Sofie; Princess Franziska; Princess Luise; Prince Josef
- House: House of Waldeck and Pyrmont
- Father: Christian Louis of Waldeck
- Mother: Anna Elisabeth of Rappoltstein

Friedrich Anton Ulrich, Prince of Waldeck and Pyrmont (German: Friedrich Anton Ulrich Fürst zu Waldeck und Pyrmont; 27 November 1676 – 1 January 1728) was the first reigning Prince of Waldeck and Pyrmont from 1712 to 1728.

== Early life and ancestry ==
Born into the House of Waldeck, he was the youngest son of Christian Louis, Count of Waldeck by his first wife, Countess Anna Elisabeth of Rappoltstein (1644-1676).

== Reign ==
From 1706 to 1712 he was Count of Waldeck and Pyrmont. On 6 January 1712 he was elevated to Prince by the Emperor Charles VI.

== Marriage and children ==
He married his second cousin, Countess Palatine Louise of Zweibrücken-Birkenfeld on 22 October 1700 in Hanau.

By birth, she was a member of the House of Wittelsbach, the youngest daughter of Christian II, Count Palatine of Zweibrücken-Birkenfeld by his first wife, Countess Catharine Agathe of Rappoltstein.

They had five sons and six daughters:

- Prince Christian of Waldeck and Pyrmont (13 October 1701 – 17 May 1728)
- Princess Friederike of Waldeck and Pyrmont (10 November 1702 – 4 December 1713)
- Princess Henriette of Waldeck and Pyrmont (17 October 1703 – 29 August 1785)
- Karl August, Prince of Waldeck and Pyrmont (24 September 1704 – 29 August 1763), married Countess Palatine Christiane Henriette of Zweibrücken-Birkenfeld, had issue.
- Princess Ernestine of Waldeck and Pyrmont (6 November 1705 – 26 May 1782), married Frederick Bernard, Count Palatine of Gelnhausen, had issue.
- Prince Louis of Waldeck and Pyrmont (5 May 1707 – 24 July 1739)
- Prince Johann of Waldeck and Pyrmont (9 June 1708 – 30 November 1713)
- Princess Sofie of Waldeck and Pyrmont (4 January 1711 – 10 August 1775), married Frederick August Vogelsang, no issue.
- Princess Franziska of Waldeck and Pyrmont (19 May 1712 – 6 January 1782)
- Princess Louise of Waldeck and Pyrmont (12 June 1714 – 17 March 1794)
- Prince Josef of Waldeck and Pyrmont (14 August 1715 – 19 February 1719)

== Death ==
Friedrich Anton Ulrich, Prince of Wadeck and Pyrmont died on 1 January 1728 in Bad Arolsen, aged 51.

He was interred, along with his wife Princess Luise, (until 1962) in the Evangelische Stadtkirche, Bad Wildungen. After that their bodied were buried in the Klosterkirche, Netze, Waldeck, Hesse, Germany.

== Ancestry ==
Ancestors of Friedrich Anton Ulrich, Prince of Waldeck and Pyrmont

16. Josias I, Count of Waldeck-Eisenberg
8. Christian, Count of Waldeck-Wildungen
17. Countess Maria of Barby-Mühlingen
4. Philip VII, Count of Waldeck-Wildungen
18. John VII, Count of Nassau-Siegen
9. Countess Elisabeth of Nassau-Siegen
19. Magdalene of Waldeck-Wildungen
2. Christian Louis, Count of Waldeck
20. Louis I, Count of Sayn-Wittgenstein
10. Louis II, Count of Sayn-Wittgenstein
21. Countess Elisabeth of Solms-Laubach
5. Countess Anna Katharina of Sayn-Wittgenstein
22. Konrad, Count of Solms-Braunfels
11. Countess Elisabeth Juliana of Solms-Braunfels
23. Countess Elisabeth of Nassau-Dillenburg
1. Friedrich Anton Ulrich, Prince of Waldeck and Pyrmont
24. Eginolf III, Lord of Rappoltstein
12. Eberhard, Count of Rappoltstein
25. Countess Maria of Erbach
6. Georg Friedrich, Count of Rappoltstein
26. Count Otto I of Salm, Wild- und Rheingraf in Kyrburg
13. Countess Anna von Salm, Wild- und Rheingräfin
27. Countess Ottilia of Nassau-Weilburg
3. Countess Anna Elisabeth of Rappoltstein
28. John George I, Count of Solms-Laubach
14. Henry William I, Count of Solms-Sonnenwalde
29. Margarethe von Schönburg-Glauchau
7. Countess Elisabeth Charlotte of Solms-Sonnenwalde
30. Louis Eberhard, Count of Oettingen-Oettingen
15. Countess Maria Magdalena of Oettingen-Oettingen
31. Countess Margarethe of Erbach

== Notes and sources ==
- Friedrich Anton Ulrich in the German National Library catalogue
- waldecker-muenzen.de

Friedrich Anton Ulrich, Prince of Waldeck and Pyrmont House of Waldeck and Pyrmont Cadet branch of the House of Waldeck Born: 27 November 1676 Died: 1 January 1728
Regnal titles
Preceded by Christian Louis	Count of Waldeck and Pyrmont; 12 December 1706 – 6 January 1712	Elevated to Prince
New title	Prince of Waldeck and Pyrmont; 6 January 1712 – 1 January 1728	Succeeded by Charles August
