= Countess Caroline of Nassau-Saarbrücken =

German noble (1704–1774)

Caroline of Nassau-Saarbrücken
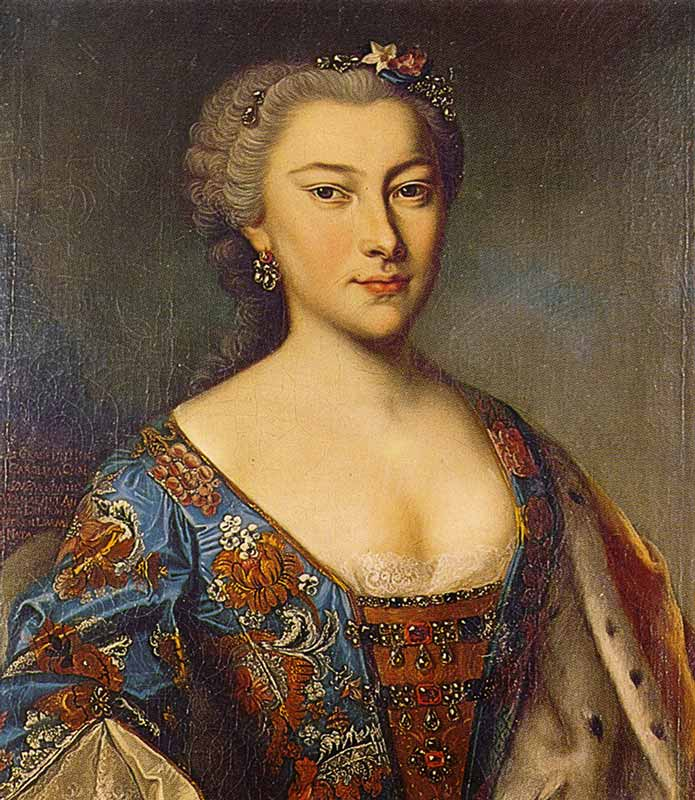
- Portrait, c. 1748
- Born: 12 August 1704
- Died: 25 March 1774 (aged 69); Darmstadt
- Spouse: Christian III of Zweibrücken (m. 1719; died 1735)
- Issue: Caroline, Landgravine of Hesse-Darmstadt; Christian IV, Duke of Zweibrücken; Frederick Michael, Count Palatine of Birkenfeeld-Bishwiller-Rappolstein; Christiane, Princess of Waldeck-Pyrmont
- House: Nassau
- Father: Louis Crato of Nassau-Saarbrücken
- Mother: Philippine Henriette of Hohenlohe

Countess Caroline of Nassau-Saarbrücken (12 August 1704 – 25 March 1774) was Countess Palatine of Zweibrücken by marriage. She served as regent of Zweibrücken during the minority of her son Christian IV, Count Palatine of Zweibrücken, between 1735 and 1740.

== Biography ==
She was the daughter of Count Louis Crato of Nassau-Saarbrücken and Countess Philippine Henriette of Hohenlohe.

On 21 September 1719, at the age of 15, she married her 44-year-old godfather, Christian III of Zweibrücken. The wedding took place at Castle Lorenzen in Nassau. This marriage produced four children:

- Caroline Henriette Christine (1721–1774), called "the great landgravine"

married to Landgrave Louis IX of Hesse-Darmstadt

- Christian IV (1722–1775), Count Palatine and Duke of Palatinate-Zweibrücken
- Frederick Michael (1724–1767), Count Palatine of Birkenfeld
- Christiane Henriette (1725–1816), Countess Palatine of Zweibrücken-Birkenfeld and by marriage Princess of Waldeck-Pyrmont

When Christian III died in 1735, Caroline took over the Regency for five years, with the consent of Emperor Charles VI, until her son Christian IV came of age.

From 1744 to 1774 she lived at Bergzabern Castle. She died on 25 March 1774 in Darmstadt at the age of 69. Her grave is in the City Church in Darmstadt.
