= Christian III, Count Palatine of Zweibrücken =

Christian III
- Count Palatine of Zweibrücken
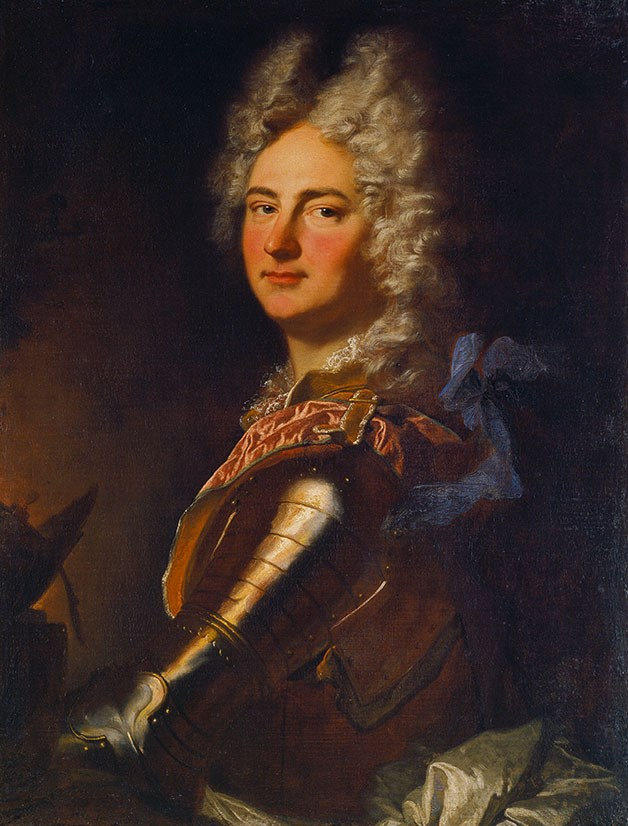
- Portrait by Hyacinthe Rigaud, 1706
- Born: 7 November 1674; Strassburg
- Died: 3 February 1735 (aged 60); Zweibrücken
- Burial: Alexander Church in Zweibrücken
- Spouse: Caroline of Nassau-Saarbrücken (m. 1719)
- Issue Detail: Caroline, Landgravine of Hesse-Darmstadt; Christian IV, Duke of Zweibrücken; Frederick Michael, Count Palatine of Birkenfeeld-Bishwiller-Rappolstein; Christiane, Princess of Waldeck-Pyrmont
- House: Palatinate-Zweibrücken-Birkenfeld
- Father: Christian II of Zweibrücken-Birkenfeld
- Mother: Katharina Agathe, Countess of Rappoltstein

Christian III, Count Palatine of Zweibrücken-Birkenfeld (Strassburg, 7 November 1674 – Zweibrücken, 3 February 1735) was a German nobleman. He was a member of the House of Palatinate-Zweibrücken-Birkenfeld, a cadet branch of the House of Wittelsbach. He was the son of Christian II of Zweibrücken-Birkenfeld and Katharina Agathe, Countess of Rappoltstein. He was Count Palatine of Zweibrücken-Birkenfeld from 1717 to 1731. In 1731, he inherited the sovereign duchy of Palatine Zweibrücken and thus became Count Palatine and Duke of Zweibrücken. He was also Count of Rappoltstein from 1699 until his death.

== Life ==
Christian was born in Strasbourg in 1674. He was the only son of Christian II, Count Palatine of Zweibrücken-Birkenfeld to survive into adulthood.

He began his career in the French military in 1697 and took over the Alsatian regiment. In 1699, he inherited the County of Rappoltstein from his mother. In 1702 he became Field marshal and in 1704 he was promoted to lieutenant general. He excelled militarily at the Battle of Oudenaarde in 1708.

In 1717, his father died. He left the army and took up administration of Zweibrücken-Birkenfeld, which was a small part of the County of Sponheim. In 1731, Count Palatine Gustavus Samuel Leopold of Zweibrücken died childless and Christian III inherited his territory. His relatives objected, but in a treaty with Elector Palatine Charles III Philip concluded in Mannheim on 24 December 1733, it was agreed that Christian would receive Palatine Zweibrücken.

He died in Zweibrücken in 1735 and is buried alongside other counts/dukes of the house's line, in the crypt of Alexander's Church (Alexanderskirche) in Zweibrücken, built in 1493 by his ancestor Alexander, Count Palatine of Zweibrücken.

== Marriage and issue ==
In 1719, at Château de Lorentzen, he married Caroline of Nassau-Saarbrücken (1704–1774) and had four children.

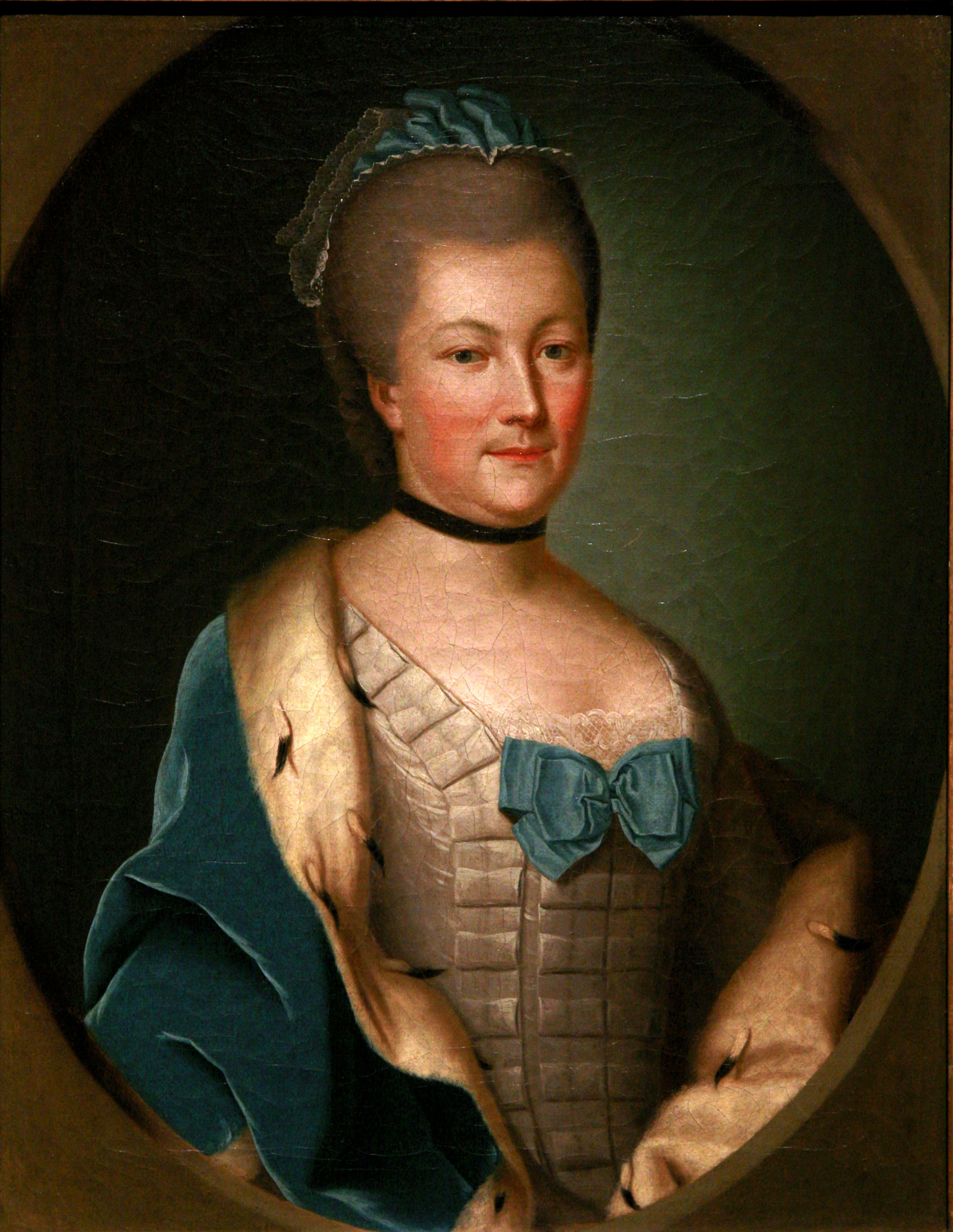
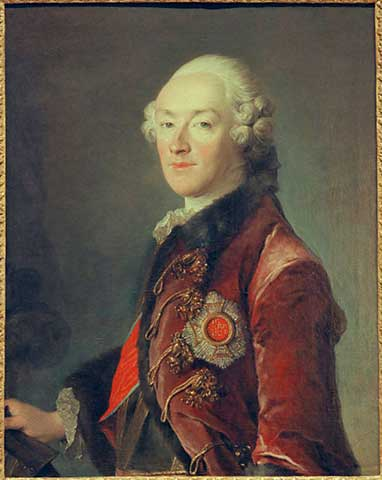
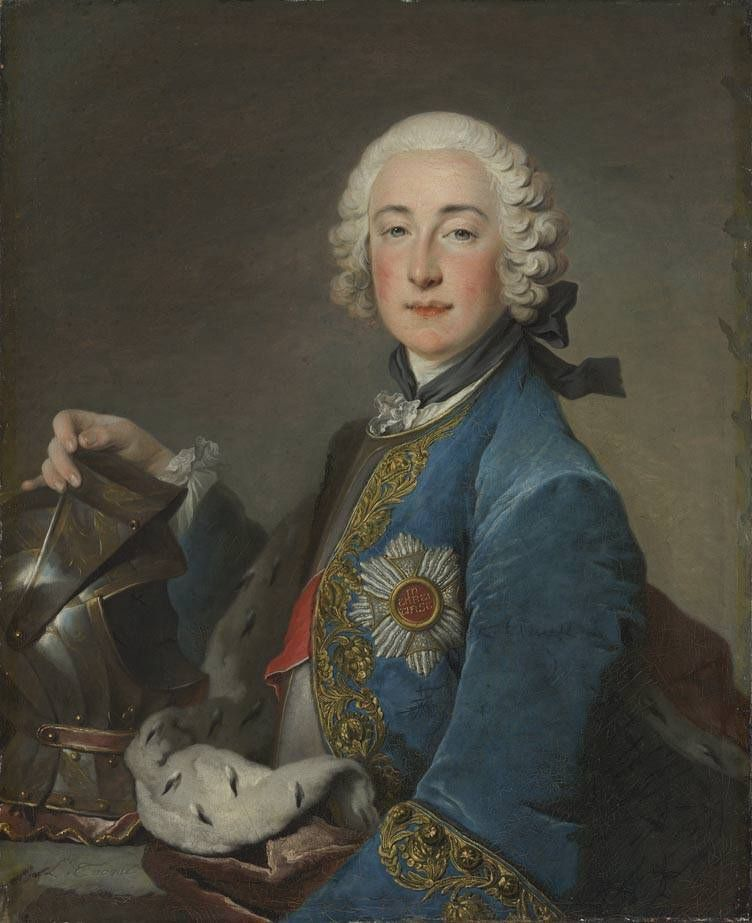
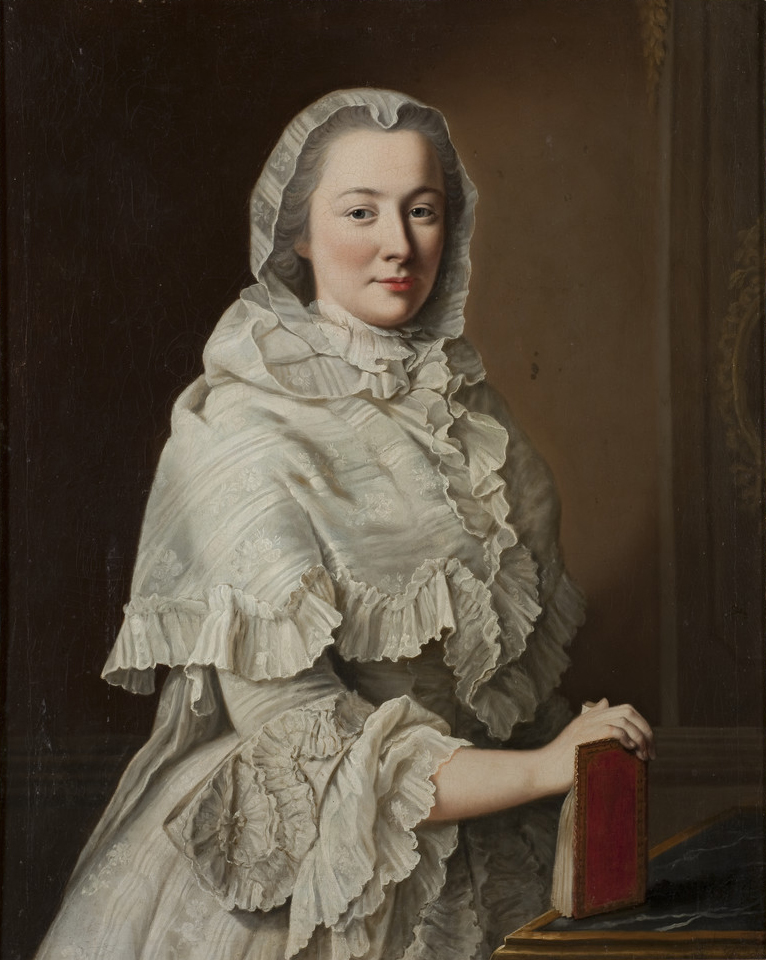
Name	Portrait	Birth	Death	Notes
Caroline Henriette Christine; Landgravine of Hesse-Darmstadt		9 March 1721	30 March 1774	Married in 1741 Louis IX, Landgrave of Hesse-Darmstadt, had issue
Christian IV; Count Palatine of Zweibrücken		6 September 1722	5 November 1775	Married morganatically in 1751 Maria Johanna Camasse, had issue
Frederick Michael; Count Palatine of Zweibrücken		27 February 1724	15 August 1767	Married in 1746 Countess Palatine Maria Franziska of Sulzbach, had issue
Christiane Henriette; Princess of Waldeck and Pyrmont		16 November 1725	11 February 1816	Married in 1741 Karl August, Prince of Waldeck and Pyrmont, had issue

== Ancestry ==
Ancestors of Christian III, Count Palatine of Zweibrücken

8. Charles I, Count Palatine of Zweibrücken-Birkenfeld
4. Christian I, Count Palatine of Birkenfeld-Bischweiler
9. Dorothea of Brunswick-Lüneburg
2. Christian II, Count Palatine of Zweibrücken-Birkenfeld
10. John II, Count Palatine of Zweibrücken
5. Countess Palatine Magdalene Catherine of Zweibrücken
11. Princess Catherine de Leon, Visconte de Rohan
1. Christian III, Count Palatine of Zweibrücken
12. Eberhard, Count of Rappoltstein
6. Johann Jakob, Count of Rappoltstein
13. Anna of Salm-Kyrburg
3. Countess Katharina Agathe of Rappoltstein
14. Johann Kasimir, Count of Salm-Kyrburg
7. Anna Claudia of Salm-Kyrburg
15. Dorothea of Solms-Laubach

Christian III, Count Palatine of Zweibrücken House of Wittelsbach Born: 7 November 1674 Died: 3 February 1735
Preceded by Katharina Agathe	Count of Rappoltstein; 1699-1735	Succeeded by Christian IV
Preceded by Christian II	Count at Sponheim; 1717–1735	Succeeded by Christian IV
Preceded by Gustav	Duke of Zweibrücken; 1731–1735	Succeeded by Christian IV
