= Bad Arolsen =

Place in Hesse, Germany

- Town
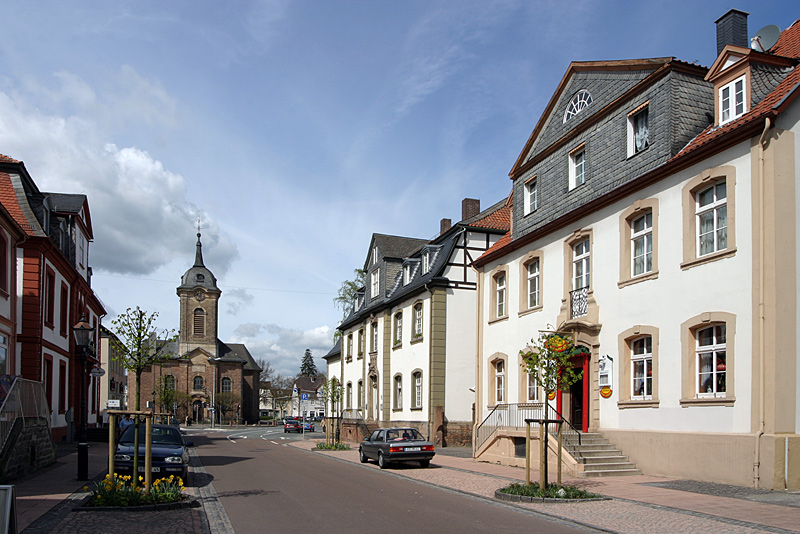
- The Schlossstrasse in the central district of Bad Arolsen - in the far west the Kirchplatz with church

- Coat of arms

- Location of Bad Arolsen within Waldeck-Frankenberg district
- Interactive map of Bad Arolsen
- Location within Germany Location within Hesse
- Coordinates: 51°22′N 9°1′E
- Country: Germany
- State: Hesse
- Admin. region: Kassel
- District: Waldeck-Frankenberg

Government
  - Mayor (2022–28): Marko Lambion

Area
  - Total: 126.47 km^{2} (48.83 sq mi)
- Elevation: 286 m (938 ft)

Population (2025-12-31)
  - Total: 15,998
  - Density: 126.50/km^{2} (327.62/sq mi)
- Time zone: UTC+01:00 (CET)
  - Summer (DST): UTC+02:00 (CEST)
- Postal codes: 34454
- Dialling codes: 05691, 05696
- Vehicle registration: KB, WA
- Website: Stadt Bad Arolsen

Bad Arolsen (German: [baːt ˈʔaːʁɔlzn̩], until 1997 Arolsen, Bad being the German name for Spa) is a small town in northern Hesse, Germany, in Waldeck-Frankenberg district. From 1655 until 1918 it served as the residence town of the Princes of Waldeck-Pyrmont and then until 1929 as the capital of the Waldeck Free State. The International Tracing Service has its headquarters in Bad Arolsen.

== Geography ==
=== Location ===
Bad Arolsen is situated roughly 45 km west of Kassel.

The German-Dutch holiday road called the Orange Route runs through the town, joining towns, cities and regions associated with the House of Orange.

=== Neighbouring municipalities ===
Bad Arolsen neighbours are: the town of Diemelstadt to the north, the town of Volkmarsen (both belonging to the county of Waldeck-Frankenberg); the town of Wolfhagen in the southeast (Kassel district); the town of Waldeck to the south, the municipality of Twistetal to the southwest; the municipality of Diemelsee to the west (the last three in Waldeck-Frankenberg county) and the town of Marsberg (Hochsauerlandkreis in North Rhine-Westphalia).

=== Constituent municipalities ===
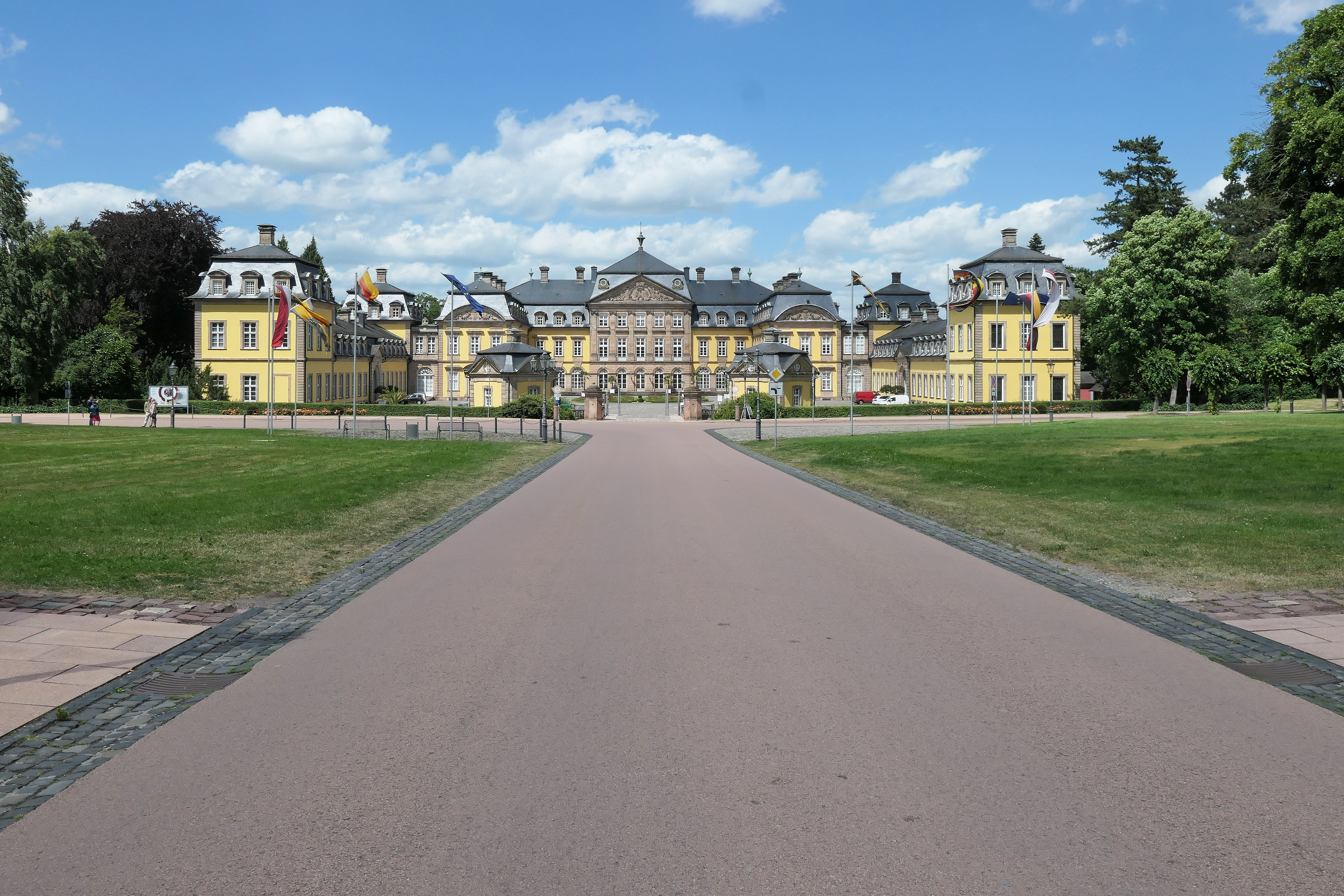
Stately residence "Residenzschloss"

Besides the main district (8,300 inhabitants), which bears the same name as the town, Bad Arolsen consists of the following subdivisions:

- Braunsen, 199 inhabitants
- Bühle, 110 inhabitants
- Kohlgrund, 255 inhabitants.
- Helsen, 2,156 inhabitants
- Landau, 1,120 inhabitants
- Massenhausen, 583 inhabitants
- Mengeringhausen, 3,746 inhabitants
- Neu-Berich, 246 inhabitants
- Schmillinghausen, 495 inhabitants
- Volkhardinghausen, 130 inhabitants
- Wetterburg, 859 inhabitants

== History ==
The earliest documents mentioning Arolsen date back to 1131 when an Augustinian nunnery was established there with the name of "Aroldessen". The nunnery was secularized in 1526 and in 1655 became the residence of the Counts (later Princes) of Waldeck, who converted it into a stately home. It was torn down in 1710 and replaced with a new Baroque structure (1713–1728) by Friedrich Anton Ulrich, Prince of Waldeck and Pyrmont (1676–1728).

From 1918 to 1929 Arolsen was capital of the Free State of Waldeck-Pyrmont (after 1922: Free State of Waldeck), which was subsequently incorporated into Prussia.

During World War II, in 1943–1945, the Nazis operated in Arolsen a subcamp of the Buchenwald concentration camp, which housed a total of 185 prisoners, of whom 35% were from German-occupied Poland, 30% from German-occupied Russia and 15% from Germany. After the war, the town was located within the American-occupied zone of Germany, and became part of West Germany.

In 2003, the town hosted the 43rd Hessentag state festival.

== Politics ==
=== Town council ===
The town council's 37 seats are apportioned in accordance with municipal elections held on 26 March 2006:

CDU	15 seats
SPD	11 seats
Offene Liste	3 seats
FDP	3 seats
FWG	3 seats
Greens	2 seats

Note: "FWG" is a citizens' coalition. Offene Liste is the independent "Open List".

=== Town government ===
The town is governed by the town magistrate which is headed by the Mayor of Bad Arolsen. The incumbent Mayor is Jürgen van der Horst (Independent), first elected in 2007. His current six-year term is scheduled to end in 2025.

=== Coat of arms ===
Bad Arolsen's civic coat of arms might heraldically be described thus: In argent a nine-leaved oak tree vert with four acorns Or, before which an inescutcheon within which in Or a bar-topped letter "A" sable surmounted by a halved eight-pointed star sable.

The oak tree stands for the surrounding woods and indirectly the fresh air that Bad Arolsen is known for as a climatic spa. The inescutcheon shows the town's (original) initial, and the eight-pointed star of Waldeck.

The original arms were dropped in 1938 owing to a perceived reference to Freemasonry, which was not officially tolerated in Nazi Germany. The charge in question was "God's Eye" – a triangle with the sun's rays shining out of it, such as may still be seen in Bad Krozingen's civic coat of arms. Bad Arolsen's old arms showed the same inescutcheon over this, but "God's Eye" was replaced with an oak tree in 1938.

=== Partnerships ===
- (Germany) Bad Köstritz, Thüringen
- Heusden-Zolder, Belgium
- Hermann, Missouri, United States
- (Germany) Klütz, Mecklenburg-Vorpommern

== Culture and sightseeing ==
=== The town ===
Worthy of note is the town's baroque layout near the stately home. The street grid shows a chequered pattern that was typical of that time. It was originally planned to build a mirror-image layout to the stately home's east and west, but the plans were never fully carried out; after completing the developments west of the stately home, there was no money left to do the eastern part. Instead, the mirrored layout is illustrated by landscaping the area with trees and bushes. Some of the development's buildings are protected by law. Since 1999 there has been a Gestaltungssatzung – or "design code" – in place to ensure the townscape's current form through collective protection.

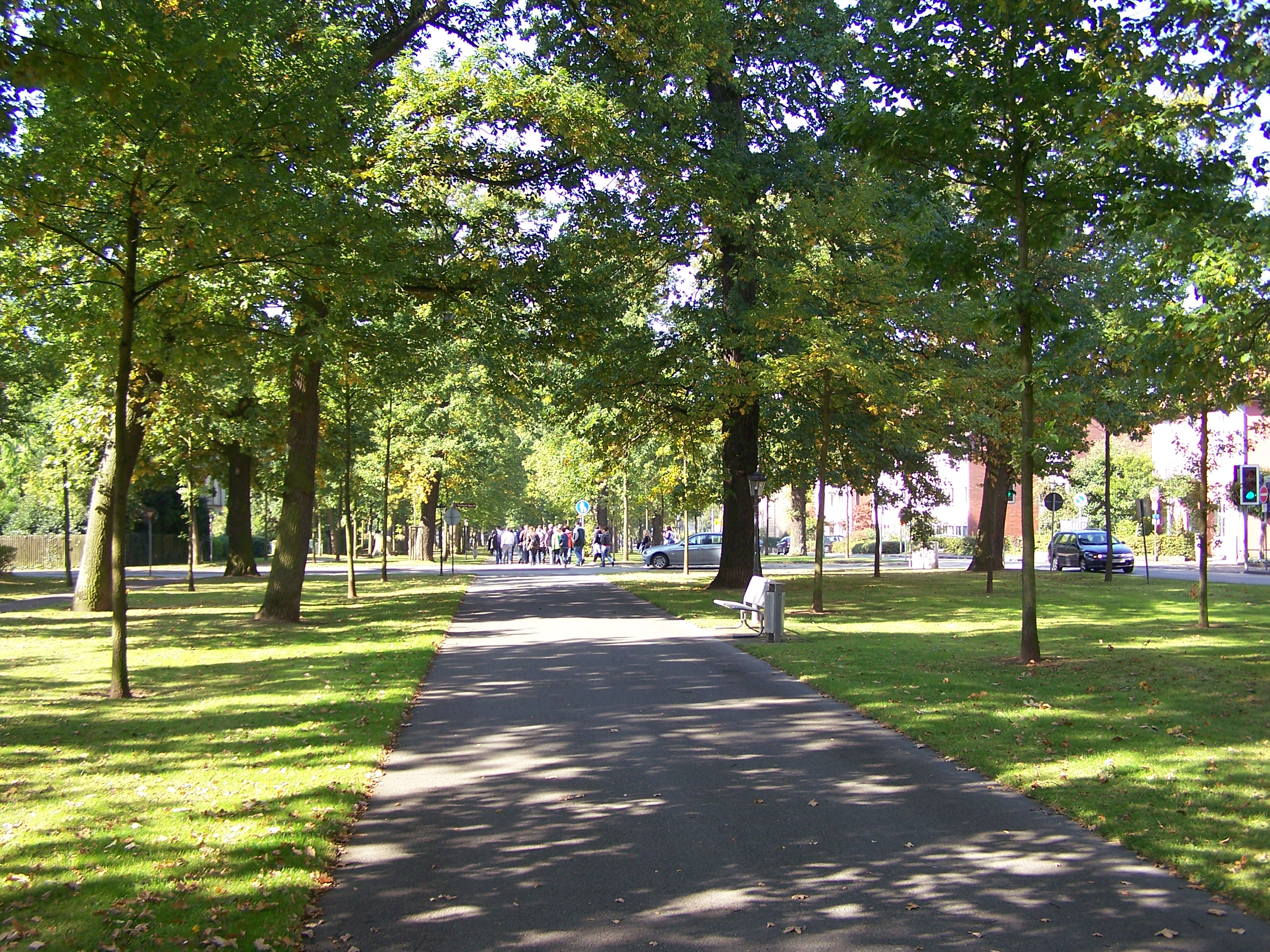
The "Grosse Allee" or "Grand Avenue"

The Grosse Allee ("Grand Avenue") is a broad avenue running one mile from east to west lined by some 880 German oak trees in a six-line arrangement. The avenue was built in 1676 as a connecting way for the carriages between the "Residenzschloss" and the princely "Lustschloss", the latter having been torn down in the year 1725.

=== Buildings ===
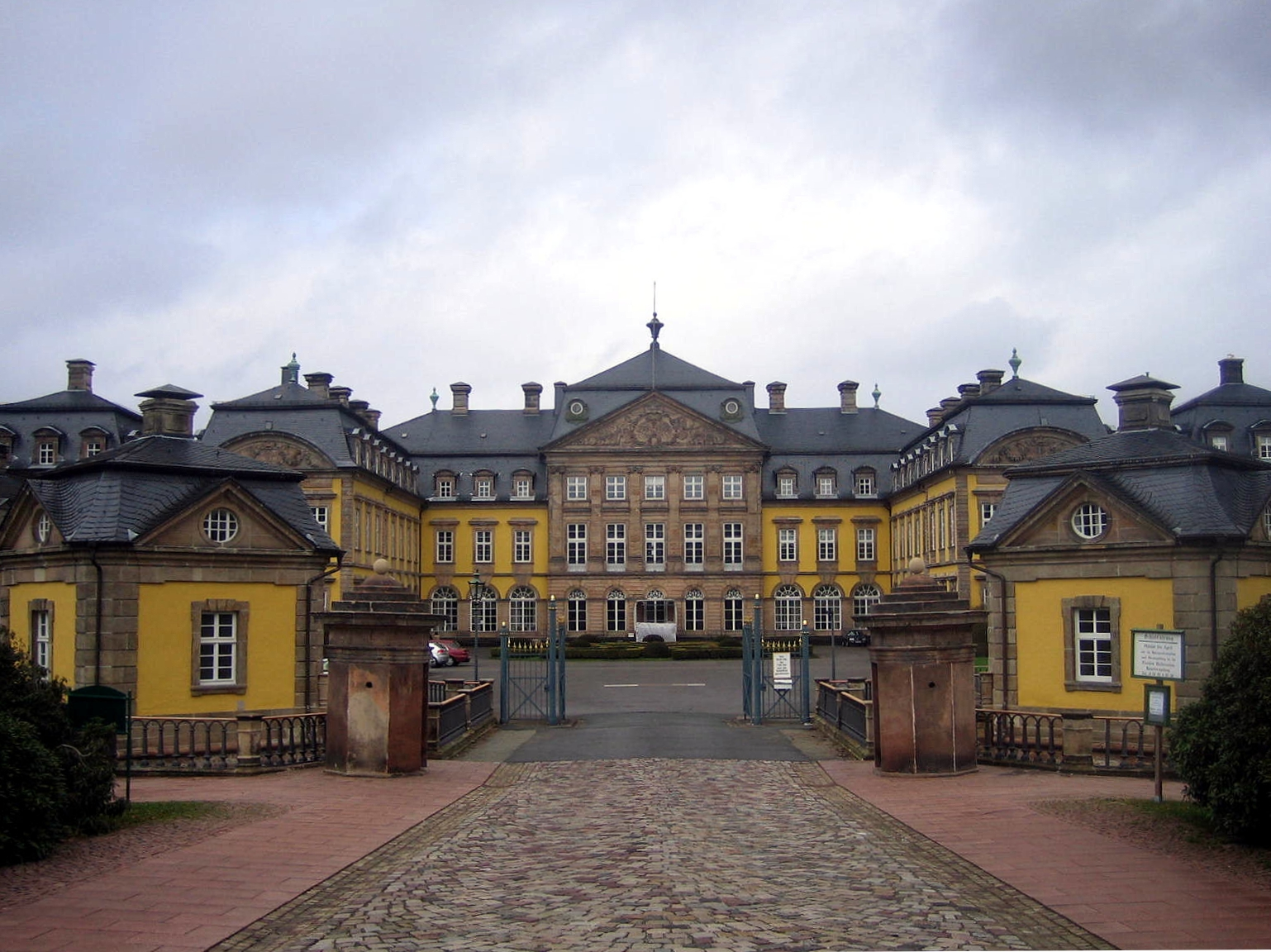
Schloss Arolsen

- The baroque-style Schloß Arolsen, originally belonging to the Princes of Waldeck-Pyrmont with its imposing construction was built between 1713 and 1728 by architect Julius Ludwig Rothweil. Of particular importance are the ceiling paintings by the Italian artist Carlo Ludovici Castelli, and the outstanding stucco works by Andrea Gallasini.
- Landauer Wasserkunst, an historic waterworks in Landau dating from 1555.

=== Regular events ===
- March/April: Lighting of the Easter Fire on the Königsberg fair ground
- May: Arolser Barockfestspiele (Baroque festival)
- August: Arolser Kram- und Viehmarkt (a fair with amusement rides, household goods and cattle markets at the Königsberg fair ground)
- August: Bad Arolsen Twistesee Triathlon running
- November: Bad Arolsen Advent Waldmarathon running
- December: Weihnachtsmarkt (Christmas fair at the Kirchplatz in the towns central place "Kirchplatz")
- Repeating every seven years (last time 2007): The "Freischiessen festival" in Mengeringhausen

== Economy and infrastructure ==
Of particular economic importance to the town was its role as a garrison. In 1994 the Belgian Army deactivated its garrison and left the town. On 17 December 2004, the Bundeswehr deactivated its camp in Mengeringhausen.

=== Transport ===
Bad Arolsen is located on the railway line from Kassel to Korbach. Local public transport is also handled by buses of the North Hesse Transport Association (Nordhessischer Verkehrsverbund; NVV). The town is also served by the BRS (Busverkehr - Ruhr - Sieg) bus company.

=== Public institutions ===
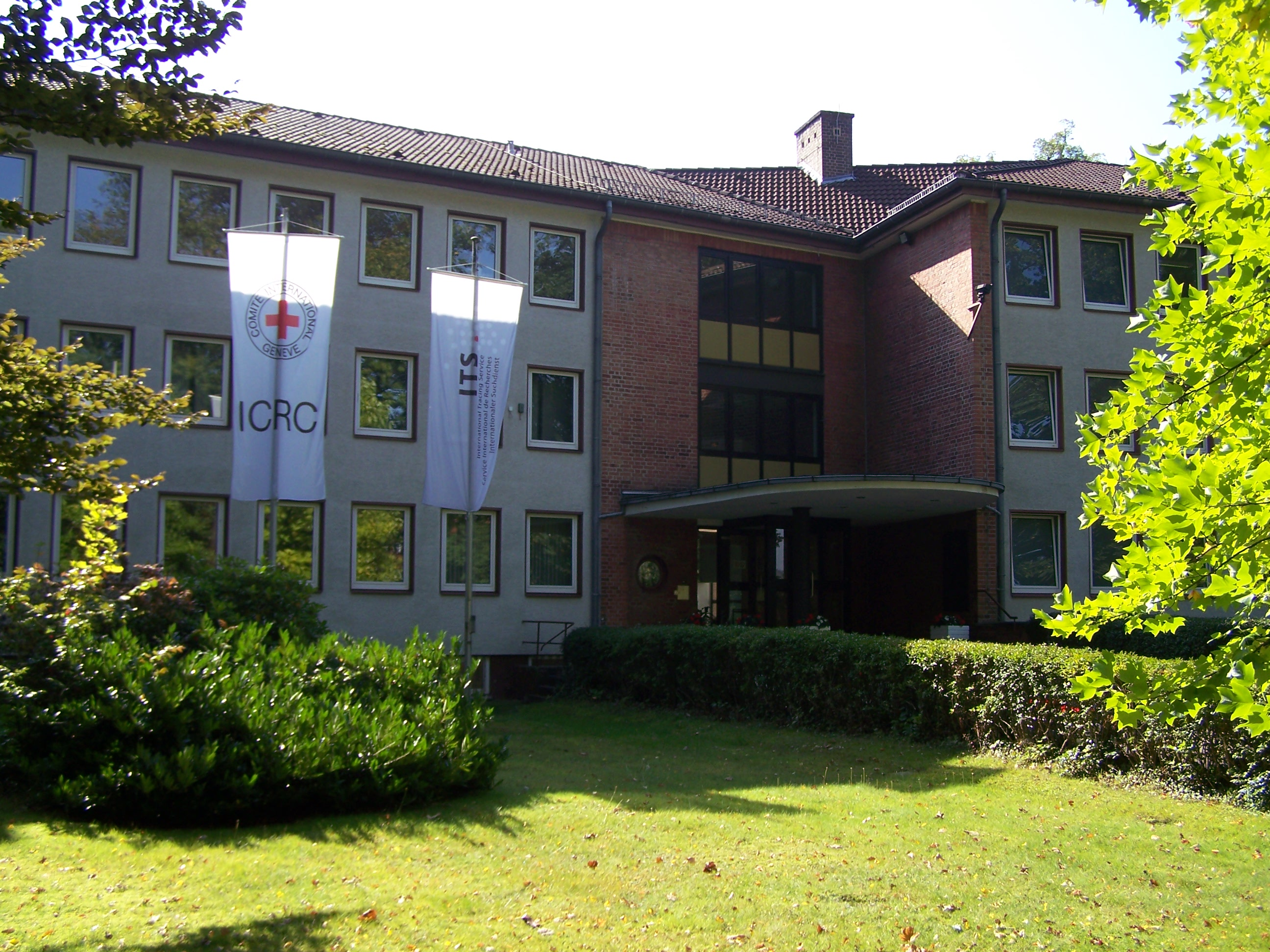
Main building of the ITS complex

Since 1946, Bad Arolsen has been headquarters to the International Tracing Service, an organization dedicated to finding missing civilians, typically lost to family and friends as a result of war or political unrest during World War II. The institution was led and administered until December 2012 by the International Committee of the Red Cross and funded by the Federal Republic of Germany; it is now administered by the Federal Republic of Germany.

A venue for millions of documents related to the Nazi-attempted extermination of the Jewish people and others, the ITS holds vast archives of Nazi-related documents. In April 2006, German justice minister Brigitte Zypries announced that Germany would cooperate with the United States and allow survivors and historians of the Holocaust access to 47 million pages of documents, although an eleven-nation accord had to decide unanimously that this was to be done. More than 12 million of the documents have now being digitally scanned and shared with research institutions around the world. The archive fully opened when France, Italy and Greece ratified changes to the access protocol. Information kept hidden from the public since its inception was finally opened to the public in November 2007.

== Well known persons ==
- Otto von Bismarck, former Chancellor of the German Empire from 1871 until 1890, is an "honorary citizen" of Bad Arolsen.

=== Notable people ===
- 1556, Philipp Nicolai, song-poet and Reformer, in Mengeringhausen (died 1608 in Hamburg)
- 1620, Prince Georg Friedrich von Waldeck (died 1692 in Bad Arolsen)
- 1740, Ernst Eichner, composer (died 1777 in Potsdam)
- 1743, Friedrich Karl August, Prince of Waldeck and Pyrmont (died 1812), Prince of Waldeck and Pyrmont
- 1747, George I, Prince of Waldeck and Pyrmont (died 1813), Prince of Waldeck and Pyrmont
- 1767, Johann Stieglitz, doctor (died 1840 in Hanover)
- 1777, Christian Daniel Rauch, sculptor (died 1857 in Dresden); The Museum in Bad Arolsen looks after his memorial.
- 1805, Wilhelm von Kaulbach, painter, noted as a muralist, (died 1874 in Munich).
- 1822, Friedrich Kaulbach, painter (died 1903 in Hanover)
- 1831, George Victor, Prince of Waldeck and Pyrmont (died 1893), Prince of Waldeck and Pyrmont
- 1838, Walther Herwig, founder of German high-sea fishing (died 1912)
- 1858, Adelheid Emma Wilhelmina Theresia von Waldeck-Pyrmont, Queen and 1890–1898 Regent of the Netherlands (Dutch King William III's second wife; died 1934 in The Hague)
- 1861, August Bier, surgeon, in Helsen (died 1949 in Sauen (near Beeskow))
- 1865. Friedrich, Prince of Waldeck and Pyrmont (died 1946), Prince of Waldeck and Pyrmont
- 1873, Rudolf Klapp, orthopaedics professor
- 1896, Josias Erbprinz von Waldeck-Pyrmont, SS Obergruppenführer (died 1967 in Bad Arolsen)
- 1936, Wittekind, Prince of Waldeck and Pyrmont, residing prince and chief of the House of Waldeck
