= Prince Wolrad of Waldeck and Pyrmont =

German prince (1892–1914)

Prince Wolrad
- Prince Wolrad in 1914
- Born: 26 June 1892; Arolsen, Waldeck and Pyrmont
- Died: 17 October 1914 (aged 22); Moorslede, Belgium
Names
- German: Viktor Wolrad Friedrich Adolf Wilhelm Albert(English: Victor Wolrad Frederick Adolphus William Albert)
- House: Waldeck and Pyrmont
- Father: George Victor, Prince of Waldeck and Pyrmont
- Mother: Princess Louise of Schleswig-Holstein-Sonderburg-Glücksburg

Prince Wolrad of Waldeck and Pyrmont (German: Prinz Victor Wolrad Friedrich Adolf Wilhelm Albert zu Waldeck und Pyrmont; 26 June 1892 – 17 October 1914) was the youngest child of George Victor, Prince of Waldeck and Pyrmont by his second wife Princess Louise of Schleswig-Holstein-Sonderburg-Glücksburg.

== Early life and family ==
Wolrad was born at Arolsen, Waldeck and Pyrmont, the eight child and second son George Victor, Prince of Waldeck and Pyrmont (son of George II, Prince of Waldeck and Pyrmont and Princess Emma of Anhalt-Bernburg-Schaumburg) but only child by his second wife, Princess Louise of Schleswig-Holstein-Sonderburg-Glücksburg (daughter of Friedrich, Duke of Schleswig-Holstein-Sonderburg-Glücksburg and Princess Adelheid of Schaumburg-Lippe). Through both of his parents, he was descendant of George II of Great Britain.

Wolrad grew up without his father, who died one year after his birth. He was raised by his mother; his half brother, reigning prince Friedrich also looked after his welfare.

Reuters Morgengefang in Phantasien und Skizzen (1828) by Wilhelm Hauff

He was described as a "headstrong but pious child" and the future dragoon was noted to be fond of singing the Reiters Morgenlied (sometimes referred to as Reuters Morgengefang) by Wilhelm Hauff. This included the verse, "Well then, I shall fight on bravely; And should I meet my death, A gallant horseman dies!".

In 1910, he accompanied Friedrich to the funeral of King Edward VII of the United Kingdom.

His half-siblings were:

- Sophie Nikoline, Princess of Waldeck and Pyrmont (1854–1869), who died at age 15.
- Pauline, Princess of Bentheim and Steinfurt (1855–1925) who married Alexis, Prince of Bentheim and Steinfurt
- Marie, Princess William of Württemberg (1857–1882) who married the future William II of Württemberg.
- Emma, Queen of the Netherlands (1858–1934) who married William III of the Netherlands.
- Helena, Duchess of Albany (1861–1922) who married Prince Leopold, Duke of Albany.
- Friedrich, Prince of Waldeck and Pyrmont (1865–1946), last reigning prince of Waldeck and Pyrmont.
- Elizabeth, Princess of Waldeck and Pyrmont (1873-1961), who married Alexander, Prince of Erbach-Schönberg.

He was unmarried.

== Education and military career ==
=== Education ===
He studied at Kassel Gymnasium, the alma mater of Wilhelm II, and then had shorter periods of study at New College, Oxford and Grenoble and Heidelberg (he was member of Corps Saxoborussia).

He attended New College, Oxford in 1910 at the age of 17 years old for the Easter and Trinity term. There are no noted records of what he studied or of him taking any exams.

While studying in Oxford, he stayed at 4 St Margaret's Road in North Oxford. During April and May, he would stay with his half-sister Helena, the Duchess of Albany. It is recorded that he went during these times to a wedding with her at the Christ Church cathedral.

He attended Heidelberg for a singular semester.

Since these studies did not appear to lead to anything, it was desirable to send him to the army.

=== Military career ===
He showed more interest for the army than university and soon became a lieutenant in the Twenty-third Prussian Regiment of Dragoons and on the staff of the Eighty-third Regiment of Infantry.

During the First World War he fought in Vosges and later in the Battle of the Marne.

He ultimately came to Moorslede, Belgium, where he died while on patrol in The Western Front theatre.

== Ancestry ==
Ancestors of Prince Wolrad of Waldeck and Pyrmont

8. George I, Prince of Waldeck and Pyrmont
4. George II, Prince of Waldeck and Pyrmont
9. Princess Augusta of Schwarzburg-Sondershausen
2. George Victor, Prince of Waldeck and Pyrmont
10. Victor II, Prince of Anhalt-Bernburg-Schaumburg-Hoym
5. Princess Emma of Anhalt-Bernburg-Schaumburg-Hoym
11. Princess Amelia of Nassau-Weilburg
1. Prince Wolrad of Waldeck and Pyrmont
12. Friedrich Wilhelm, Duke of Schleswig-Holstein-Sonderburg-Glücksburg
6. Friedrich, Duke of Schleswig-Holstein-Sonderburg-Glücksburg
13. Princess Louise Caroline of Hesse-Kassel
3. Princess Louise of Schleswig-Holstein-Sonderburg-Glücksburg
14. George William, Prince of Schaumburg-Lippe
7. Princess Adelheid of Schaumburg-Lippe
15. Princess Ida of Waldeck and Pyrmont

== Notes and sources ==
- The Royal House of Stuart, London, 1969, 1971, 1976, Addington, A. C., Reference: 352
