= Princess Elisabeth of Waldeck and Pyrmont =

Princess Elisabeth
- Princess of Erbach-Schönberg
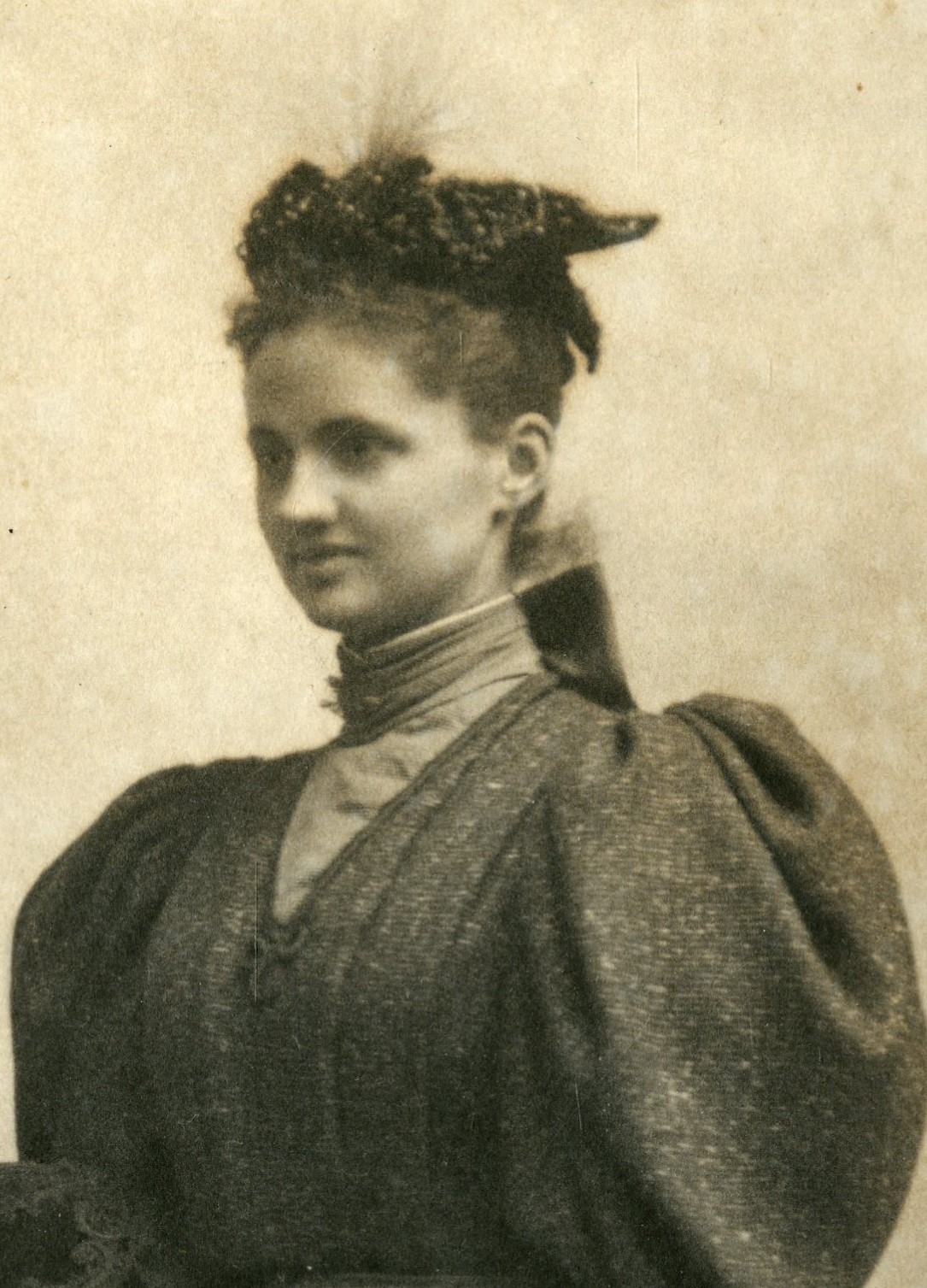
- Elisabeth c. 1897
- Born: 6 September 1873; Arolsen, Waldeck and Pyrmont
- Died: 23 November 1961 (aged 88); Bensheim, West Germany
- Spouse: Alexander, Prince of Erbach-Schönberg (m. 1900; died 1944)
- Issue: Princess Imma, Baroness of Dornberg; George Louis, Prince of Erbach-Schönberg; Prince William; Princess Helena
Names
- Luise Elisabeth Hermine Erika
- House: Waldeck and Pyrmont
- Father: George Victor, Prince of Waldeck and Pyrmont
- Mother: Princess Helena of Nassau

Princess Elisabeth of Waldeck and Pyrmont (German: Prinzessin Luise Elisabeth Hermine Erica Pauline zu Waldeck und Pyrmont; 6 September 1873 – 23 November 1961) was the youngest daughter of George Victor, Prince of Waldeck and Pyrmont and wife of Alexander, 2nd Prince of Erbach-Schönberg.

== Early life ==
Elisabeth was born at Arolsen, Waldeck and Pyrmont, the seventh child and youngest daughter of George Victor, Prince of Waldeck and Pyrmont, and his wife, Princess Helena of Nassau, daughter of William, Duke of Nassau. She was closely related to the Dutch royal family and distantly to the British royal family through both her parents, who are descendants of King George II of Great Britain.

She was a sister, among others, of:

- Princess Sophie Nikoline of Waldeck and Pyrmont (1854–1869), who died of tuberculosis at age 15.
- Princess Pauline of Waldeck and Pyrmont (1855–1925), who married Alexis, Prince of Bentheim and Steinfurt.
- Marie, Princess William of Württemberg (1857–1882), who married future William II of Württemberg.
- Emma, Queen of the Netherlands (1858–1934), who married William III of the Netherlands.
- Princess Helena, Duchess of Albany (1861–1922), who married Prince Leopold, Duke of Albany.
- Friedrich, Prince of Waldeck and Pyrmont (1865–1946), last reigning prince of Waldeck and Pyrmont.

She was a half-sister of:

- Prince Victor Wolrad Friedrich Adolf Wilhelm Albert of Waldeck and Pyrmont (1892–1914), who was the only son of their father's second marriage with Princess Louise of Schleswig-Holstein-Sonderburg-Glücksburg and was killed in action during World War I.

== Marriage and family ==
Elisabeth married on 3 May 1900 in Arolsen, Alexander, Prince of Erbach-Schönberg, eldest child of Gustav, Prince of Erbach-Schönberg and Princess Marie of Battenberg. They had four children:

- Princess Imma of Erbach-Schönberg (11 May 1901 – 14 March 1947)
- George Louis, Prince of Erbach-Schönberg (1 January 1903 – 27 January 1971)
- Prince William of Erbach-Schönberg (4 June 1904 – 27 September 1946)
- Princess Helena of Erbach-Schönberg (8 April 1907 – 16 April 1979)

As grandaunt of the bride, she was a guest at the 1937 wedding of Juliana of the Netherlands with Prince Bernhard of Lippe-Biesterfeld.

At her death, she was the last surviving child of Prince George Victor and Princess Helena.

== Ancestry ==
Ancestors of Princess Elisabeth of Waldeck and Pyrmont

8. George I, Prince of Waldeck and Pyrmont
4. George II, Prince of Waldeck and Pyrmont
9. Princess Auguste of Schwarzburg-Sondershausen
2. George Victor, Prince of Waldeck and Pyrmont
10. Victor II, Prince of Anhalt-Bernburg-Schaumburg-Hoym
5. Princess Emma of Anhalt-Bernburg-Schaumburg-Hoym
11. Princess Amelia of Nassau-Weilburg
1. Princess Elisabeth of Waldeck and Pyrmont
12. Frederick William, Prince of Nassau-Weilburg
6. William, Duke of Nassau
12. Burgravine Louise Isabelle of Kirchberg
3. Princess Helena of Nassau
14. Prince Paul of Württemberg
7. Princess Pauline of Württemberg
15. Princess Charlotte of Saxe-Hildburghausen

↑Ancestors of Princess Elisabeth of Waldeck and Pyrmont.

== Notes and sources ==
- The Royal House of Stuart, London, 1969, 1971, 1976, Addington, A. C., Reference: 351
