= Princess Marie of Waldeck and Pyrmont =

Marie of Waldeck and Pyrmont
- Princess William of Württemberg
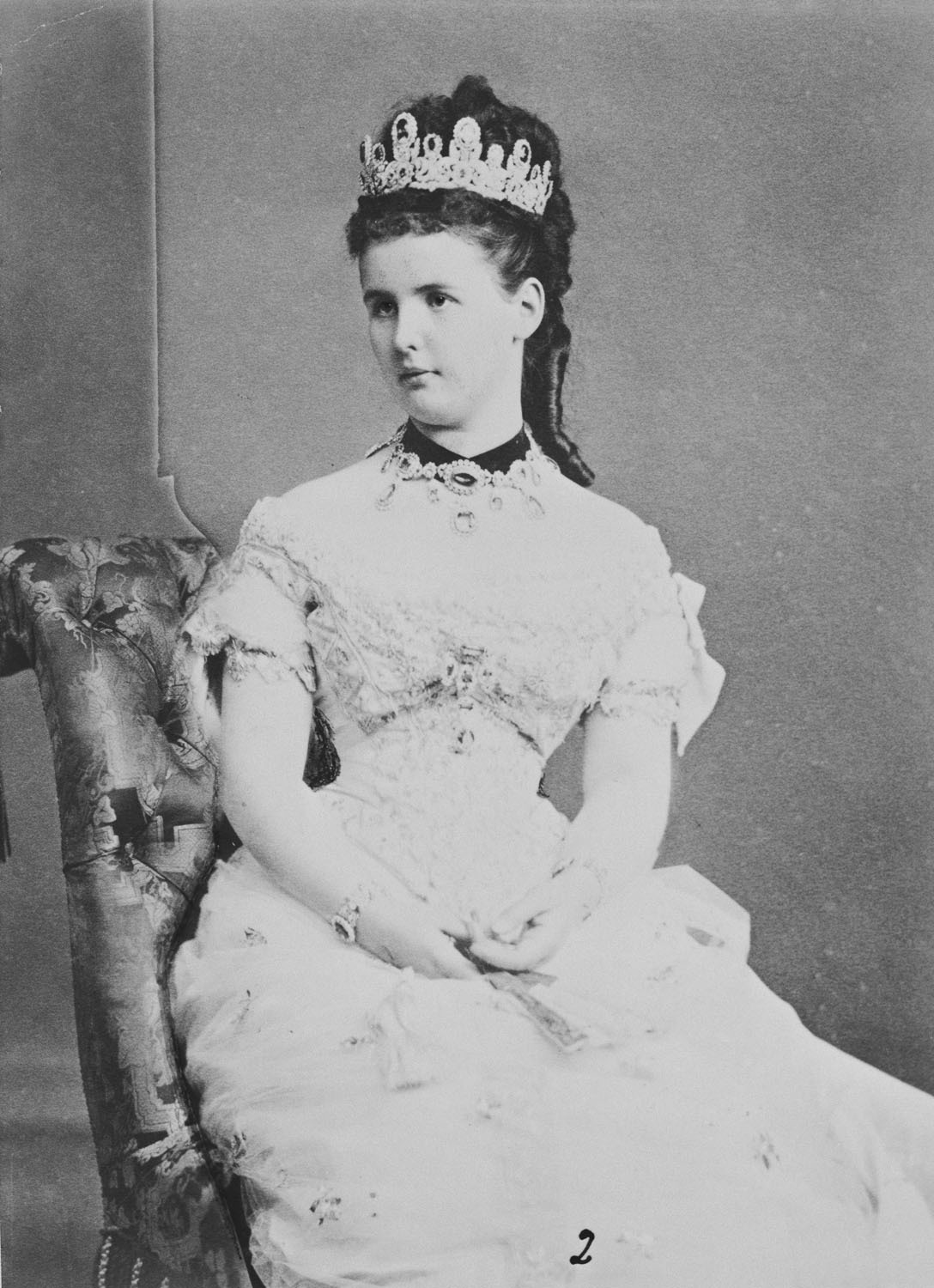
- Princess Marie in 1877
- Born: 23 May 1857; Arolsen, Waldeck and Pyrmont
- Died: 30 April 1882 (aged 24); Ludwigsburg, Württemberg
- Burial: Alter Friedhof, Ludwigsburg
- Spouse: Prince William of Württemberg (m. 1877)
- Issue: Pauline, Princess of Wied; Prince Ulrich
Names
- Georgine Henriette Marie
- House: Waldeck and Pyrmont
- Father: George Victor, Prince of Waldeck and Pyrmont
- Mother: Princess Helena of Nassau

Princess Georgine Henriette Marie of Waldeck and Pyrmont (23 May 1857 – 30 April 1882) was the Crown Princess of Württemberg.

== Early life and ancestry ==
Marie was born into the House of Waldeck-Pyrmont, as the third daughter of George Victor, Prince of Waldeck and Pyrmont and Princess Helena of Nassau, younger half-sister of Adolphe, Grand Duke of Luxembourg.

== Family ==
Marie was born in Arolsen, then part of the German Principality of Waldeck and Pyrmont. Her younger brother, Friedrich, was the last reigning prince of Waldeck and Pyrmont.

Two of her younger sisters, Emma and Helena, married her third cousin once removed William III of the Netherlands and Prince Leopold, Duke of Albany (youngest son of Queen Victoria), respectively.

== Marriage ==
At the age of 19, Marie married Crown Prince William of Württemberg (later William II of Württemberg) on 15 February 1877 in Arsolen. The couple had three children:

- Princess Pauline of Württemberg (19 December 1877 – 7 May 1965); married in 1898 William Frederick, Prince of Wied (1872–1945), and had issue.
- Prince Ulrich of Württemberg (28 July 1880 – 28 December 1880), died in infancy
- A stillborn daughter (24 April 1882)

== Death ==
Marie died on 30 April 1882 in Stuttgart, after giving birth to her third child. William married again in 1886 to her second cousin, Charlotte of Schaumburg-Lippe.

== Ancestry ==
Ancestors of Princess Marie of Waldeck and Pyrmont

8. George I, Prince of Waldeck and Pyrmont
4. George II, Prince of Waldeck and Pyrmont
9. Princess Augusta of Schwarzburg-Sondershausen
2. George Victor, Prince of Waldeck and Pyrmont
10. Victor II, Prince of Anhalt-Bernburg-Schaumburg-Hoym
5. Princess Emma of Anhalt-Bernburg-Schaumburg-Hoym
11. Princess Amelia of Nassau-Weilburg
1. Princess Marie of Waldeck and Pyrmont
12. Frederick William, Prince of Nassau-Weilburg
6. William, Duke of Nassau
12. Burgravine Louise Isabelle of Kirchberg
3. Princess Helena of Nassau
14. Prince Paul of Württemberg
7. Princess Pauline of Württemberg
15. Princess Charlotte of Saxe-Hildburghausen
