= Princess Louise of Schleswig-Holstein-Sonderburg-Glücksburg =

Princess of Waldeck and Pyrmont from 1891 to 1893

Princess Louise
- Princess of Waldeck and Pyrmont
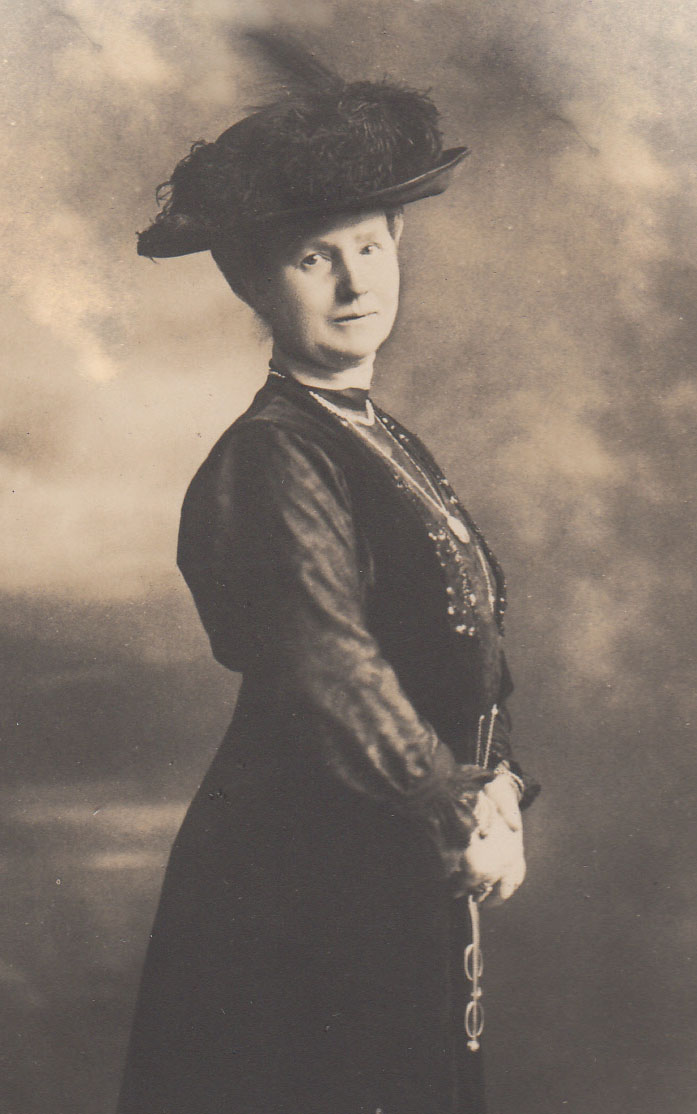
- Princess Louise in 1907
- Born: 6 January 1858; Schloss Luisenlund, Kiel, Duchy of Schleswig
- Died: 2 July 1936 (aged 78); Marburg an der Lahn, Nazi Germany
- Spouse: George Victor, Prince of Waldeck and Pyrmont (m. 1891; died 1893)
- Issue: Prince Wolrad
Names
- Louise Caroline Juliana; German: Luise Karoline Juliane
- House: Glücksburg (by birth); Waldeck and Pyrmont (by marriage)
- Father: Friedrich, Duke of Schleswig-Holstein-Sonderburg-Glücksburg
- Mother: Princess Adelheid of Schaumburg-Lippe

Princess Louise of Schleswig-Holstein-Sonderburg-Glücksburg (6 January 1858 – 2 July 1936) was the second wife and consort of George Victor, Prince of Waldeck and Pyrmont. Louise was the third child and second eldest daughter of Friedrich, Duke of Schleswig-Holstein-Sonderburg-Glücksburg and Princess Adelheid of Schaumburg-Lippe; a niece of Christian IX of Denmark and a cousin of Queen Alexandra of the United Kingdom, Frederik VIII of Denmark and George I of Greece.

== Marriage and issue ==
Louise married George Victor, Prince of Waldeck and Pyrmont, son of George II, Prince of Waldeck and Pyrmont and his wife Princess Emma of Anhalt-Bernburg-Schaumburg-Hoym, on 29 April 1891 at Schloss Luisenlund. Louise and George Victor had one son, Prince Wolrad (26 June 1892 – 17 October 1914), who would later be killed in action shortly after the outbreak of the First World War.

Upon her marriage to George Victor, Louise became the stepmother of five surviving children from her husband's first marriage to Princess Helena of Nassau. Louise's stepchildren included Emma, Queen of the Netherlands (only seven months her junior) and Princess Helena, Duchess of Albany. She was 41 years younger than her late stepson-in-law William III of the Netherlands. Louise died one and one half years before the birth of her step-great-great-granddaughter Beatrix of the Netherlands.

== Ancestry ==
Ancestors of Princess Louise of Schleswig-Holstein-Sonderburg-Glücksburg

8. Friedrich Karl Ludwig, Duke of Schleswig-Holstein-Sonderburg-Beck
4. Friedrich Wilhelm, Duke of Schleswig-Holstein-Sonderburg-Glücksburg
9. Countess Friederike of Schlieben
2. Friedrich, Duke of Schleswig-Holstein-Sonderburg-Glücksburg
10. Prince Charles of Hesse-Kassel
5. Princess Louise Caroline of Hesse-Kassel
11. Princess Louise of Denmark and Norway
1. Princess Louise of Schleswig-Holstein-Sonderburg-Glücksburg
12. Philip II Ernest, Count of Schaumburg-Lippe
6. George William, Prince of Schaumburg-Lippe
13. Princess Juliane of Hesse-Philippsthal
3. Princess Adelheid of Schaumburg-Lippe
14. George I, Prince of Waldeck and Pyrmont
7. Princess Ida of Waldeck and Pyrmont
15. Princess Auguste of Schwarzburg-Sondershausen

Princess Louise of Schleswig-Holstein-Sonderburg-Glücksburg House of Schleswig-Holstein-Sonderburg-Glücksburg Cadet branch of the House of Oldenburg Born: 6 January 1858 Died: 2 July 1936
German royalty
Vacant Title last held by Princess Helena of Nassau	Princess of Waldeck and Pyrmont; 29 April 1891 – 12 May 1893	Vacant Title next held by Princess Bathildis of Schaumburg-Lippe
