= Princess Helena of Nassau =

Princess of Waldeck and Pyrmont from 1853 to 1888

Princess Helena
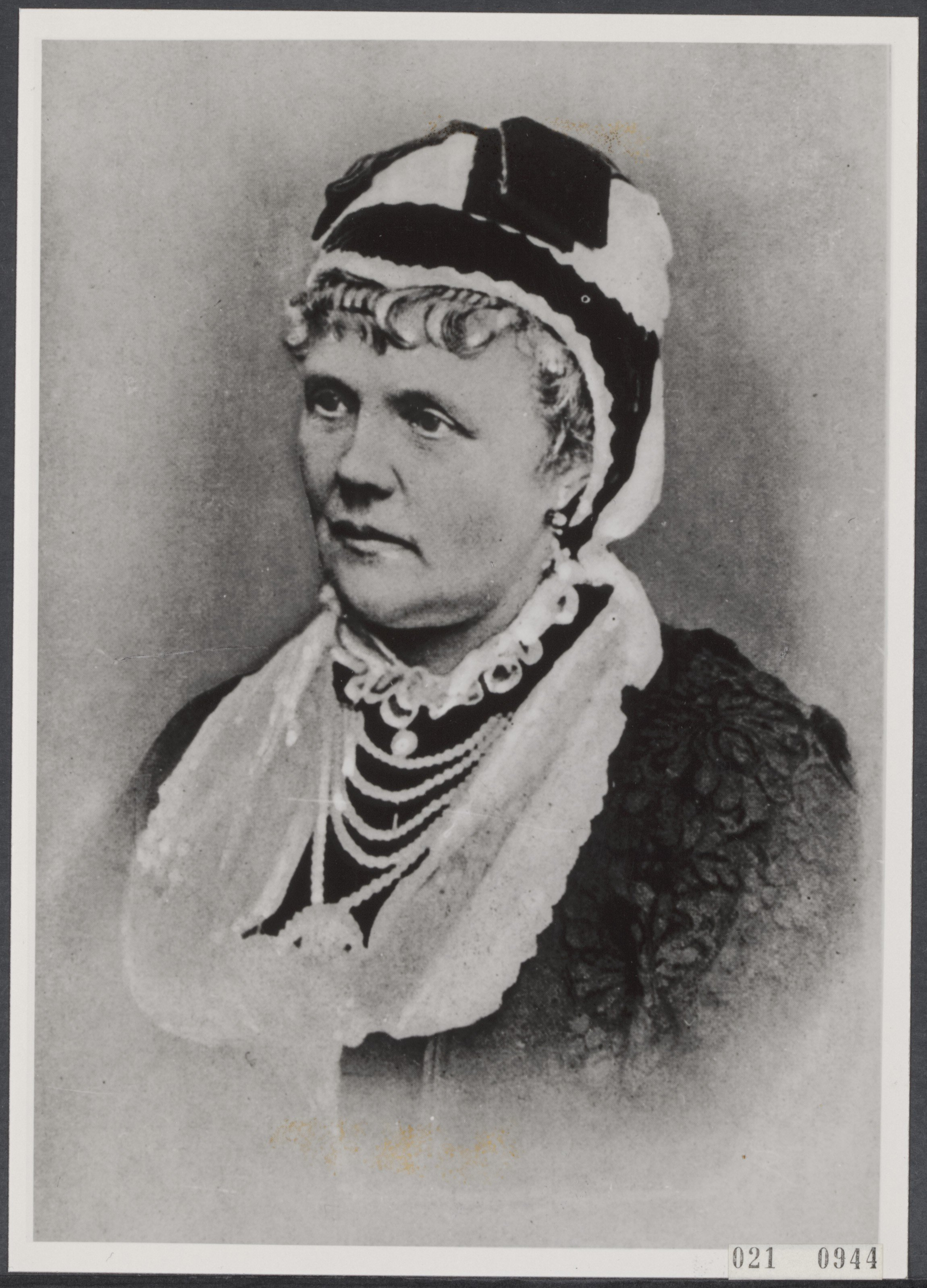
- Princess Helena c. 1870
- Born: 18 August 1831; Wiesbaden, Duchy of Nassau, German Confederation
- Died: 28 October 1888 (aged 57); Pyrmont, Principality of Waldeck and Pyrmont, German Empire
- Burial: Fuerstliches Erbbegraebnis, Rhoden
- Spouse: George Victor, Prince of Waldeck and Pyrmont (m. 1853)
- Issue: Princess Sophie; Pauline, Princess of Bentheim and Steinfurt; Marie, Princess William of Württemberg; Emma, Queen of the Netherlands; Helen, Duchess of Albany; Friedrich, Prince of Waldeck and Pyrmont; Elisabeth, Princess of Erbach-Schönberg
Names
- Helena Wilhelmina Henriette Pauline Marianne
- House: Nassau-Weilburg
- Father: William, Duke of Nassau
- Mother: Princess Pauline of Württemberg

Princess Helena of Nassau (German: Prinzessin Helene Wilhelmine Henriette Pauline Marianne von Nassau-Weilburg; 18 August 1831 – 27 October 1888) was the daughter of William, Duke of Nassau, and the wife of George Victor, Prince of Waldeck and Pyrmont.

== Early life ==
Helena was born at Wiesbaden, Duchy of Nassau. She was the ninth child of William, Duke of Nassau, with his second wife Princess Pauline of Württemberg, daughter of Prince Paul of Württemberg. She was the half-sister of Adolphe, Grand Duke of Luxembourg (then Hereditary Prince of Nassau), and full-sister to Sophia, Queen of Sweden and Norway. She was related to the Dutch royal family and also, distantly, to the British royal family through her father and mother, both were descendants of King George II of Great Britain.

== Marriage and family ==
Princess Helena married on 26 September 1853 in Wiesbaden to George Victor, Prince of Waldeck and Pyrmont, son of George II, Prince of Waldeck and Pyrmont.

=== Children ===
Helena and George Victor had seven children:

- Princess Sophie Nikoline (27 July 1854 – 5 August 1869); died of tuberculosis at 15.
- Princess Pauline (19 October 1855 – 3 July 1925) who married Alexis, Prince of Bentheim and Steinfurt, on 7 May 1881. They had eight children.
- Princess Marie (23 May 1857 – 30 April 1882) who married Prince William, later King William II of Württemberg, on 15 February 1877. They had three children.
- Princess Emma (2 August 1858 – 20 March 1934) who married King William III of the Netherlands on 7 January 1879. They had one daughter, Wilhelmina. Via this marriage, Emma is an ancestress of the Dutch royal family.
- Princess Helen (17 February 1861 – 1 September 1922) who married Prince Leopold, Duke of Albany, on 27 April 1882. Via this marriage, Helen is an ancestress of the Swedish royal family.
- Prince Friedrich (20 January 1865 – 26 May 1946), last reigning prince of Waldeck and Pyrmont, married Princess Bathildis of Schaumburg-Lippe on 9 August 1895. They had four children.
- Princess Elisabeth (6 September 1873 – 23 November 1961) married Alexander, Prince of Erbach-Schönberg, on 3 May 1900. They had four children.

=== Grandchildren ===
Among her grandchildren were:

- Pauline, Princess of Wied (1877–1965), the last senior member of the House of Württemberg.
- Wilhelmina of the Netherlands (1880–1962), queen regnant of the Netherlands.
- Princess Alice, Countess of Athlone (1883–1981), vice-regal consort of Canada.
- Charles Edward, Duke of Saxe-Coburg and Gotha (1884–1954), the last reigning Duke of Saxe-Coburg and Gotha.
- Josias, Hereditary Prince of Waldeck and Pyrmont (1896–1967)
- George Louis, Prince of Erbach-Schönberg (1903–1971)

== Ancestry ==
Ancestors of Princess Helena of Nassau

8. Charles Christian, Prince of Nassau-Weilburg
4. Frederick William, Prince of Nassau-Weilburg
9. Princess Carolina of Orange-Nassau
2. William, Duke of Nassau
10. Georg Wilhelm, Burgrave of Kirchberg
5. Burgravine Louise Isabelle of Kirchberg
11. Princess Isabella Auguste Reuss of Greiz
1. Princess Helena of Nassau
12. Frederick of Württemberg
6. Prince Paul of Württemberg
13. Duchess Augusta of Brunswick-Wolfenbüttel
3. Princess Pauline of Württemberg
14. Frederick, Duke of Saxe-Altenburg
7. Princess Charlotte of Saxe-Hildburghausen
15. Duchess Charlotte Georgine of Mecklenburg-Strelitz

== Sources ==
- The Royal House of Stuart, London, 1969, 1971, 1976, Addington, A. C., Reference: vol II page 337/347
- For My Grandchildren London, 1966, Athlone, HRH Princess Alice, Countess of, Reference: Page 41 part of biographical notes

Princess Helena of Nassau House of Nassau-Weilburg Cadet branch of the House of Nassau Born: 18 August 1831 Died: 28 October 1862
German royalty
Vacant Title last held by Princess Emma of Anhalt-Bernburg-Schaumburg-Hoym	Princess of Waldeck and Pyrmont; 26 September 1853 – 28 October 1888	Vacant Title next held by Princess Louise of Schleswig-Holstein-Sonderburg-Glücksburg
