= Friedrich, Duke of Schleswig-Holstein-Sonderburg-Glücksburg =

Friedrich
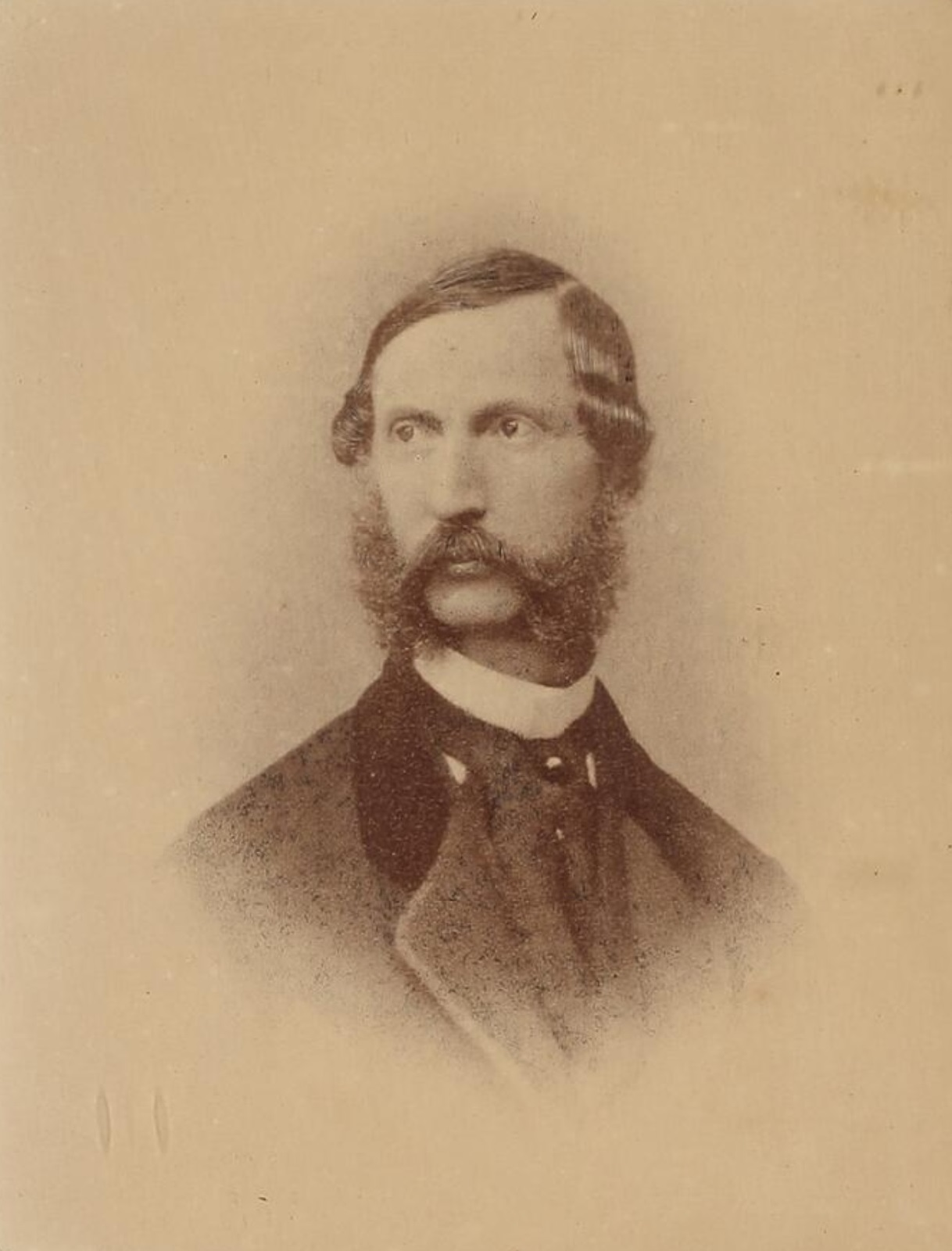
- Photograph c. 1880

Duke of Schleswig-Holstein-Sonderburg-Glücksburg
- Reign: 14 October 1878 – 27 November 1885
- Predecessor: Karl
- Successor: Friedrich Ferdinand
- Born: 23 October 1814; Schleswig
- Died: 27 November 1885 (aged 71); Luisenlund, Prussia
- Spouse: Princess Adelheid of Schaumburg-Lippe (m. 1841)
- Issue Detail: Auguste, Princess William of Hesse-Philippsthal-Barchfeld; Friedrich Ferdinand, Duke of Schleswig-Holstein; Louise, Princess of Waldeck and Pyrmont; Princess Marie; Prince Albrecht
- House: Glücksburg
- Father: Friedrich Wilhelm, Duke of Schleswig-Holstein-Sonderburg-Glücksburg
- Mother: Princess Louise Caroline of Hesse-Kassel

Friedrich, Duke of Schleswig-Holstein-Sonderburg-Glücksburg (23 October 1814 – 27 November 1885) was the third Duke of Schleswig-Holstein-Sonderburg-Glücksburg from 1878 to 1885.

== Early life and ancestry ==
Friedrich was the second-eldest son of Friedrich Wilhelm, Duke of Schleswig-Holstein-Sonderburg-Glücksburg and Princess Louise Caroline of Hesse-Kassel and the elder brother of King Christian IX of Denmark.

He inherited the title of Duke of Schleswig-Holstein-Sonderburg-Glücksburg upon his childless brother Karl's death on 14 October 1878.

== Marriage and issue ==
Friedrich married Princess Adelheid of Schaumburg-Lippe, second-eldest daughter of George William, Prince of Schaumburg-Lippe, and Princess Ida of Waldeck and Pyrmont, on 16 October 1841 in Bückeburg, Schaumburg-Lippe. Together, they had five children, two sons and three daughters:

- Princess Marie Karoline Auguste Ida Luise of Schleswig-Holstein-Sonderburg-Glücksburg (27 February 1844 – 16 September 1932), married Prince William of Hesse-Philippsthal-Barchfeld.
- Friedrich Ferdinand Georg Christian Karl Wilhelm, Duke of Schleswig-Holstein (12 October 1855 – 21 January 1934), married Princess Karoline Mathilde of Schleswig-Holstein-Sonderburg-Augustenburg.
- Princess Luise Karoline Juliane of Schleswig-Holstein-Sonderburg-Glücksburg (6 January 1858 – 2 July 1936), married George Victor, Prince of Waldeck and Pyrmont.
- Princess Marie Wilhelmine Luise Ida Friederike Mathilde Hermine of Schleswig-Holstein-Sonderburg-Glücksburg (31 August 1859 – 26 June 1941).
- Prince Albert Christian Adolf Karl Eugen of Schleswig-Holstein-Sonderburg-Glücksburg (15 March 1863 – 23 April 1948), married firstly Countess Ortrud of Ysenburg-Büdingen-Meerholz; married secondly Princess Hertha of Ysenburg und Büdingen. Albert and Hertha are the maternal grandparents of Ernst August von Hannover, Prince Ludwig Rudolf of Hanover, and Heinrich Prinz von Hannover.

== Death ==
Duke Friedrich died on 27 November 1885 at Luisenlund, aged 71. His body was buried, alongside his wife, in the Schleswig Cathedral.

== Honours ==
- Denmark:
  - Grand Cross of the Dannebrog, 22 May 1840
  - Knight of the Elephant, 18 September 1843
  - Cross of Honour of the Order of the Dannebrog, 18 September 1843
- Ascanian duchies: Grand Cross of Albert the Bear, 7 November 1852
- Electorate of Hesse: Knight of the Golden Lion
- Russian Empire: Knight of St. Anna, 1st Class

== Ancestry ==
Ancestors of Friedrich, Duke of Schleswig-Holstein-Sonderburg-Glücksburg

8. Prince Karl Anton August of Schleswig-Holstein-Sonderburg-Beck
4. Frederick Charles Louis, Duke of Schleswig-Holstein-Sonderburg-Beck
9. Countess Charlotte of Dohna-Leistenau
2. Frederick William, Duke of Schleswig-Holstein-Sonderburg-Glücksburg
10. Count Karl Leopold von Schlieben
5. Countess Friederike von Schlieben
11. Countess Marie Eleonore von Lehndorff
1. Friedrich, Duke of Schleswig-Holstein-Sonderburg-Glücksburg
12. Frederick II, Landgrave of Hesse-Kassel
6. Prince Charles of Hesse-Kassel
13. Princess Mary of Great Britain
3. Princess Louise Caroline of Hesse-Kassel
14. Frederick V of Denmark
7. Princess Louise of Denmark
15. Princess Louisa of Great Britain

Friedrich, Duke of Schleswig-Holstein-Sonderburg-Glücksburg House of Schleswig-Holstein-Sonderburg-Glücksburg Cadet branch of the House of Oldenburg Born: 23 October 1814 Died: 27 November 1885
Regnal titles
Preceded by Karl	Duke of Schleswig-Holstein-Sonderburg-Glücksburg; 14 October 1878–27 November 1885	Succeeded by Friedrich Ferdinand
