= Princess Augusta of Schleswig-Holstein =

Princess Augusta
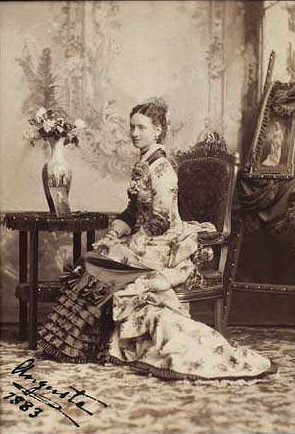
- Princess Augusta in 1883
- Born: 27 February 1844; Kiel, Duchy of Holstein
- Died: 16 September 1932 (aged 88); Rotenburg an der Fulda, Weimar Republic
- Spouse: Prince William of Hesse-Philippsthal-Barchfeld (m. 1884; died 1890)
- Issue: Prince Christian
Names
- Marie Karoline Auguste Ida Luise
- House: House of Schleswig-Holstein-Sonderburg-Glücksburg
- Father: Friedrich, Duke of Schleswig-Holstein-Sonderburg-Glücksburg
- Mother: Princess Adelheid of Schaumburg-Lippe

Princess Marie Karoline Auguste Ida Luise of Schleswig-Holstein-Sonderburg-Glücksburg (1844–1932) was a German princess of Schleswig-Holstein-Sonderburg-Glücksburg. Augusta was the oldest child and daughter of Friedrich, Duke of Schleswig-Holstein-Sonderburg-Glücksburg and Princess Adelheid of Schaumburg-Lippe; a niece of King Christian IX of Denmark and a cousin of Queen Alexandra of United Kingdom, King Frederik VIII of Denmark, and King George I of Greece.

She married Prince William of Hesse-Philippsthal-Barchfeld in 1884, becoming his fourth wife.

In her youth it had been speculated she was one of the candidates to marry the future King Edward VII of the United Kingdom.
