= Princess Helen of Waldeck and Pyrmont =

Duchess of Albany (1861–1922)

Princess Helen
- Duchess of Albany
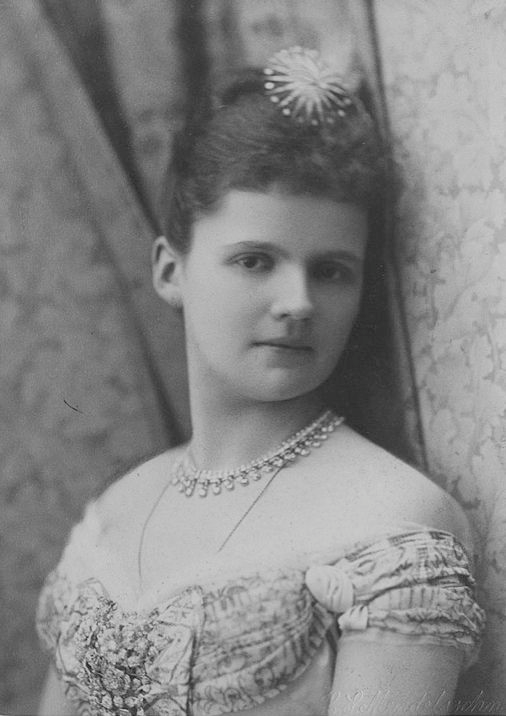
- Helen in 1882
- Born: 17 February 1861; Arolsen, Principality of Waldeck and Pyrmont, Germany
- Died: 1 September 1922 (aged 61); Hinterriß, Tyrol, Austria
- Burial: 8 September 1922; Hinterriß, Tyrol, Austria
- Spouse: Prince Leopold, Duke of Albany (m. 1882; died 1884)
- Issue: Princess Alice, Countess of Athlone; Charles Edward, Duke of Saxe-Coburg and Gotha
Names
- English: Helen Frederica Augusta; German: Helene Friederike Auguste
- House: Waldeck and Pyrmont
- Father: George Victor, Prince of Waldeck and Pyrmont
- Mother: Princess Helena of Nassau
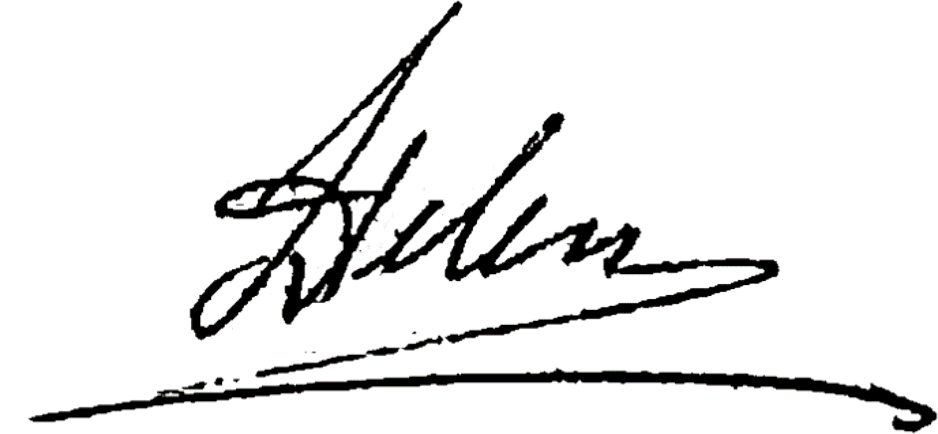
- Signature

Princess Helen of Waldeck and Pyrmont (Helen Frederica Augusta; 17 February 1861 – 1 September 1922), later Duchess of Albany, was a member of the British royal family by marriage. She was the fifth daughter and child of George Victor, Prince of Waldeck and Pyrmont, and his first wife, Princess Helena of Nassau.

== Biography ==
=== Birth and family ===
Helen was born in Arolsen, capital of the Principality of Waldeck and Pyrmont, in Germany. She was the sister of Friedrich, the last reigning Prince of Waldeck and Pyrmont; Marie, the first wife of William II of Württemberg; and of Emma, queen consort of William III of the Netherlands and mother of Queen Wilhelmina.

=== Marriage ===
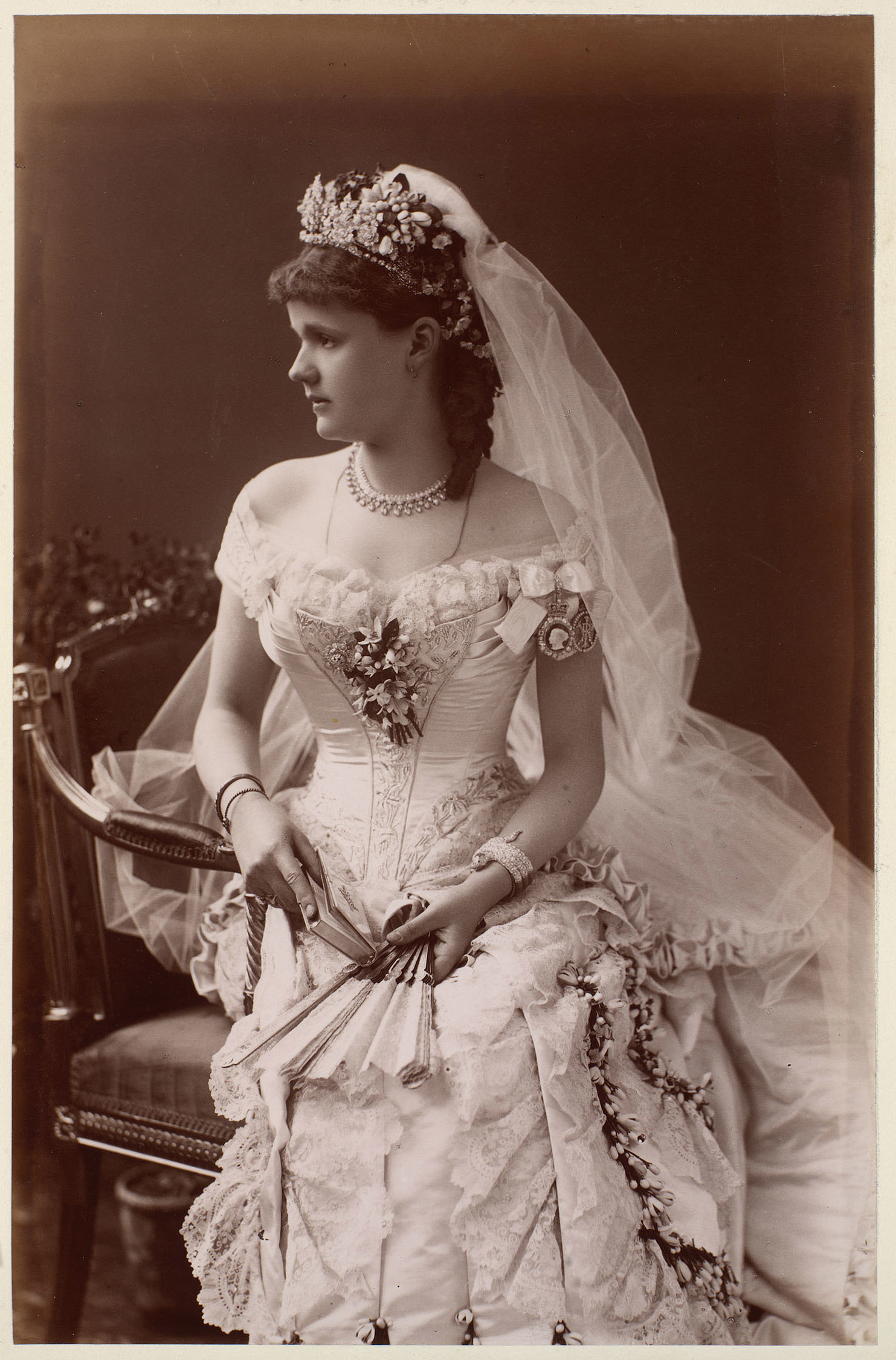
Helen on her wedding day, 1882

Along with Emma and a third sister, Pauline, Helen was considered as a second wife for William III of the Netherlands. She later met Prince Leopold, Duke of Albany, youngest son of Queen Victoria, at the suggestion of his mother. The two became engaged in November 1881.

On 27 April 1882, Leopold and Helen were married at St George's Chapel, Windsor Castle. After their wedding, Leopold and Helen resided at Claremont House. The couple had a brief, but happy marriage, ending in the hemophiliac Leopold's death from a fall in Cannes, France, in March 1884. At the time of Leopold's death, Helen was pregnant with their second child.

The couple had two children:

- Princess Alice of Albany (1883–1981), later Countess of Athlone
- Prince Charles Edward, Duke of Albany (1884–1954), later Duke of Saxe-Coburg and Gotha

=== Personality and social work ===
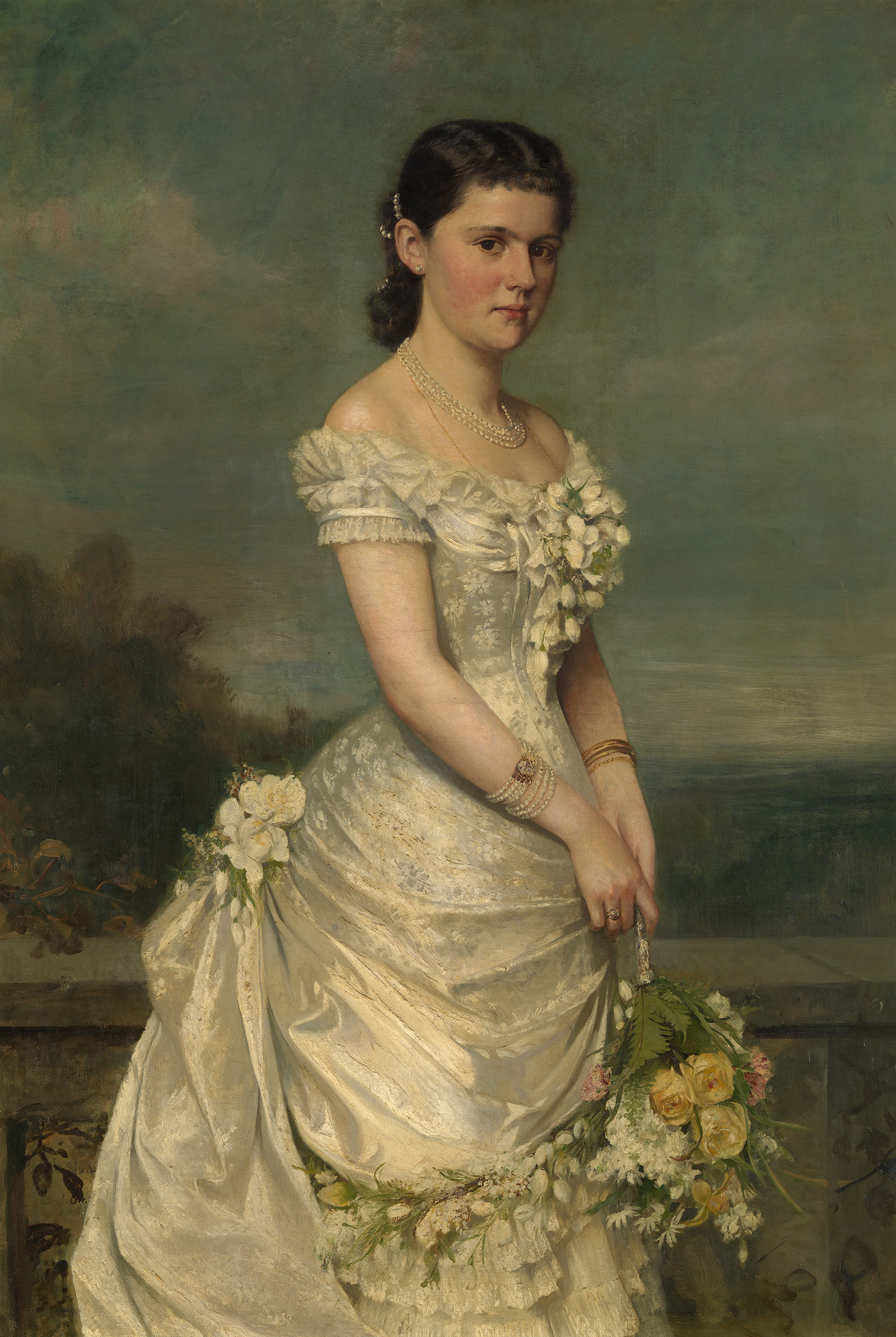
Portrait by Carl Rudolph Sohn

According to the memoirs of Helen's daughter, Princess Alice, Helen was very intelligent, had a strong sense of duty, and a genuine love of welfare work. Queen Victoria, initially worried that Helen might turn out to be a stereotypically remote German princess, remarked in a letter to her eldest daughter, Victoria, Princess Royal, that she was pleased Helen liked "to go among the people". The Queen soon came to regard her young daughter-in-law with great respect and affection, notwithstanding her initial concerns upon hearing from the match-making Vicky that Helen was an 'intellectual', being unusually well-educated for a princess. Before her marriage, Helen's father had made her superintendent of the infant schools in his principality, and in this position the Princess had devised the pupils' educational curriculum. Helen particularly enjoyed solving mathematical problems and reading philosophy: during their brief marriage, Prince Leopold proudly introduced his wife to the circle of academics he had befriended at Oxford University. Helen maintained these friendships for the rest of her life.

In 1894, Helen was one of the founders of the Deptford Fund, which instigated many projects to help the local community in Deptford. In 1899, Helen opened the Albany Institute. This later expanded into a combined community/performance centre with the theatre venue known as the Albany Empire. A centre of 1970s anti-fascist activity and Rock Against Racism, the Empire and Institute buildings were destroyed in an arson attack in 1978. A new Albany Theatre was opened by Diana, Princess of Wales in 1982.

Helen was also involved in several hospital charities and with those dedicated to ending human trafficking. During World War I, she organised much of her charity work along with that of her sister-in-law Princess Beatrice and niece Princess Marie Louise to avoid the not-uncommon problem of conflicting (and sometimes misguided) royal war-work projects.

=== Later life ===
After Leopold's death, Helen and their two children, continued to reside at Claremont House. After the death of her nephew, the Hereditary Prince of Saxe-Coburg and Gotha, in 1899, Helen's sixteen-year-old son was selected as the new heir to the German duchy, and was parted from his mother and sister in order to take up residence there. When the First World War broke out 14 years later, Charles Edward chose to support his adopted country, and, as a result, was stripped of his British titles by an act of Parliament in 1917. Helen's daughter Alice had remained with her mother in England and by marriage to Prince Alexander of Teck in 1904 had become a sister-in-law of Queen Mary, the consort of King George V.

Helen died of a heart attack in Hinterriss in Tyrol, Austria, on 1 September 1922, whilst visiting Charles Edward. On her death her estate was valued at £177,312 (resworn £183,053 and equivalent to £7.2 million in 2022). The Chiswick streets Waldeck Road and Pyrmont Road were named in her honour.

== Issue ==
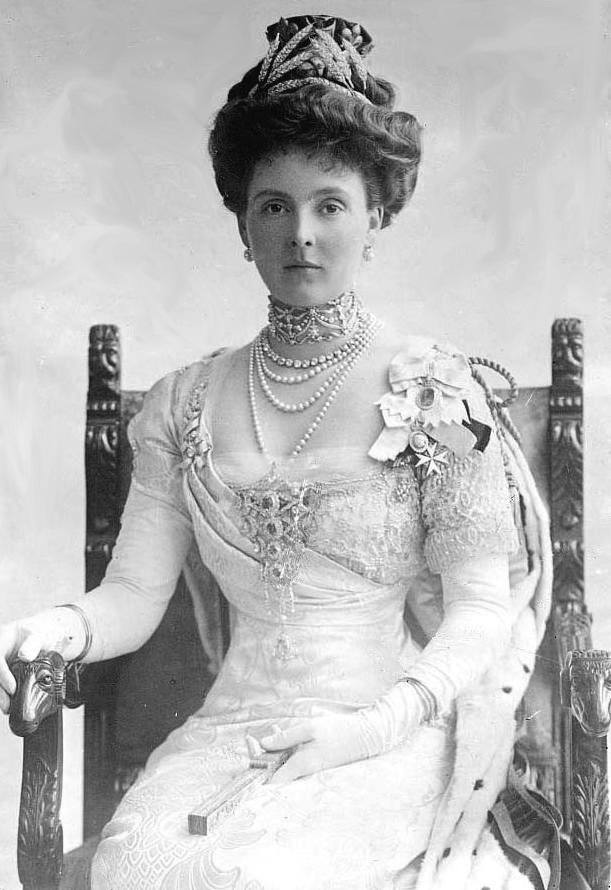
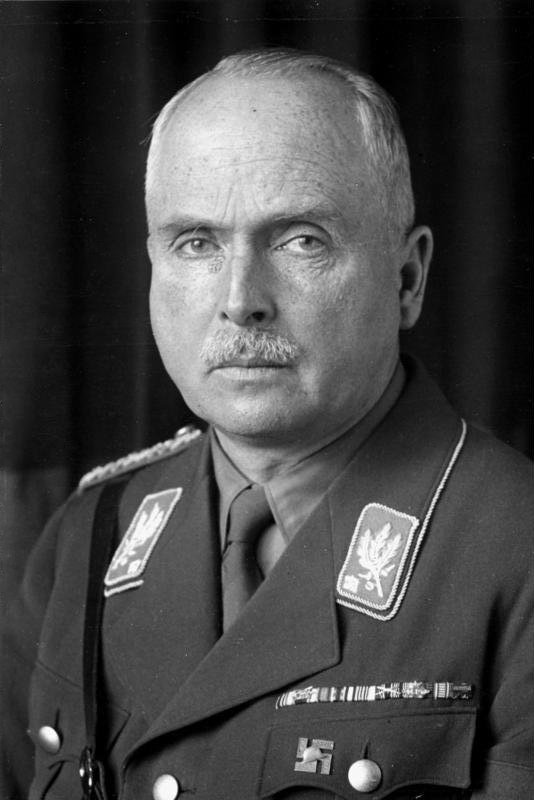
Image	Name	Birth	Death	Notes
	Princess Alice of Albany	25 February 1883	3 January 1981	later HRH Princess Alice, Countess of Athlone (and sister-in-law to Mary of Teck); had issue.
	Prince Charles Edward, Duke of Albany	19 July 1884	6 March 1954	Born four months after his father's death; known as Charlie; later reigning Duke of Saxe-Coburg and Gotha; had issue (including Princess Sibylla of Saxe-Coburg and Gotha, mother of Carl XVI Gustaf of Sweden).

== Ancestry ==
Ancestors of Princess Helen of Waldeck and Pyrmont

8. George I, Prince of Waldeck and Pyrmont
4. George II, Prince of Waldeck and Pyrmont
9. Princess Augusta of Schwarzburg-Sondershausen
2. George Victor, Prince of Waldeck and Pyrmont
10. Victor II, Prince of Anhalt-Bernburg-Schaumburg-Hoym
5. Princess Emma of Anhalt-Bernburg-Schaumburg-Hoym
11. Princess Amalie of Nassau-Weilburg
1. Princess Helen of Waldeck and Pyrmont
12. Frederick William, Prince of Nassau-Weilburg
6. William, Duke of Nassau
13. Burgravine Louise Isabelle of Kirchberg
3. Princess Helena of Nassau
14. Prince Paul of Württemberg
7. Princess Pauline of Württemberg
15. Princess Charlotte of Saxe-Hildburghausen
