= Princess Adelheid of Schaumburg-Lippe =

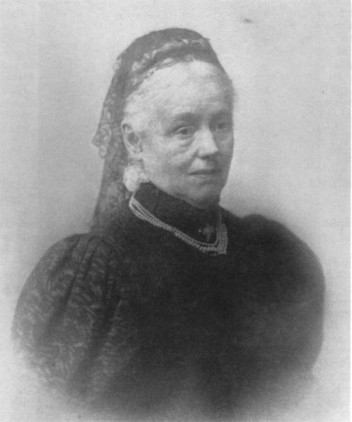

Duchess consort of Schleswig-Holstein-Sonderburg-Glücksburg
- Tenure: 24 October 1878 – 27 November 1885
- Born: 9 March 1821; Bückeburg, Schaumburg-Lippe
- Died: 30 July 1899 (aged 78); Itzehoe, Schleswig-Holstein, Germany
- Spouse: Friedrich, Duke of Schleswig-Holstein-Sonderburg-Glücksburg (m. 1841; died 1885)
- Issue: Auguste, Princess William of Hesse-Philippsthal-Barchfeld; Friedrich Ferdinand, Duke of Schleswig-Holstein; Louise, Princess of Waldeck and Pyrmont; Princess Marie; Prince Albrecht
- House: House of Lippe; House of Schleswig-Holstein-Sonderburg-Glücksburg
- Father: George William, Prince of Schaumburg-Lippe
- Mother: Princess Ida of Waldeck and Pyrmont

Princess Adelheid of Schaumburg-Lippe (9 March 1821 – 30 July 1899) was a member of the House of Schaumburg-Lippe and a Princess of Schaumburg-Lippe by birth. Through her marriage to Friedrich, Duke of Schleswig-Holstein-Sonderburg-Glücksburg, Adelheid was the sister-in-law of Christian IX of Denmark and Duchess consort of Schleswig-Holstein-Sonderburg-Glücksburg from 14 October 1878 to 27 November 1885.

== Family ==
Adelheid was the second-eldest daughter of George William, Prince of Schaumburg-Lippe and Princess Ida of Waldeck and Pyrmont. Adelheid was the younger sister of Adolf I, Prince of Schaumburg-Lippe.

== Marriage and issue ==
Adelheid married Prince Friedrich of Schleswig-Holstein-Sonderburg-Glücksburg (later Duke of Schleswig-Holstein-Sonderburg-Glücksburg), the second-eldest son of Friedrich Wilhelm, Duke of Schleswig-Holstein-Sonderburg-Glücksburg and Princess Louise Caroline of Hesse-Kassel, on 16 October 1841 in Bückeburg, Schaumburg-Lippe. Friedrich and Adelheid had five children:

- Princess Marie Karoline Auguste Ida Luise of Schleswig-Holstein-Sonderburg-Glücksburg (27 February 1844 – 16 September 1932), married Prince William of Hesse-Philippsthal-Barchfeld.
- Friedrich Ferdinand Georg Christian Karl Wilhelm, Duke of Schleswig-Holstein (12 October 1855 – 21 January 1934).
- Princess Luise Karoline Juliane of Schleswig-Holstein-Sonderburg-Glücksburg (6 January 1858 – 2 July 1936), married George Victor, Prince of Waldeck and Pyrmont.
- Princess Marie Wilhelmine Luise Ida Friederike Mathilde Hermine of Schleswig-Holstein-Sonderburg-Glücksburg (31 August 1859 – 26 June 1941).
- Prince Albrecht Christian Adolf Karl Eugen of Schleswig-Holstein-Sonderburg-Glücksburg (15 March 1863 – 23 April 1948).

== Ancestry ==
Ancestors of Princess Adelheid of Schaumburg-Lippe

8. Friedrich Ernst, Count Schaumburg-Lippe-Alverdissen
4. Philip II Ernest, Count of Schaumburg-Lippe
9. Elisabeth Philippine von Friesenhausen
2. George William, Prince of Schaumburg-Lippe
10. William, Landgrave of Hesse-Philippsthal
5. Landgravine Juliane of Hesse-Philippsthal
11. Princess Ulrike Eleonore of Hessen-Philippsthal-Barchfeld
1. Princess Adelheid of Schaumburg-Lippe
12. Karl August, Prince of Waldeck and Pyrmont
6. George I, Prince of Waldeck and Pyrmont
13. Countess Palatine Christiane Henriette of Zweibrücken-Birkenfeld
3. Princess Ida of Waldeck and Pyrmont
14. August II, Prince of Schwarzburg-Sondershausen
7. Princess Augusta of Schwarzburg-Sondershausen
15. Princess Christina of Anhalt-Bernburg

Princess Adelheid of Schaumburg-Lippe House of Lippe Born: 9 March 1821 Died: 30 July 1899
German royalty
Preceded by Vilhelmine Marie of Denmark	Duchess consort of Schleswig-Holstein-Sonderburg-Glücksburg; 14 October 1878 – 27 November 1885	Succeeded by Karoline Mathilde of Schleswig-Holstein-Sonderburg-Augustenburg
