= Hinterriß =

Tyrolean village in Schwaz District, Austria

Coordinates: 47°28′N 11°28′E

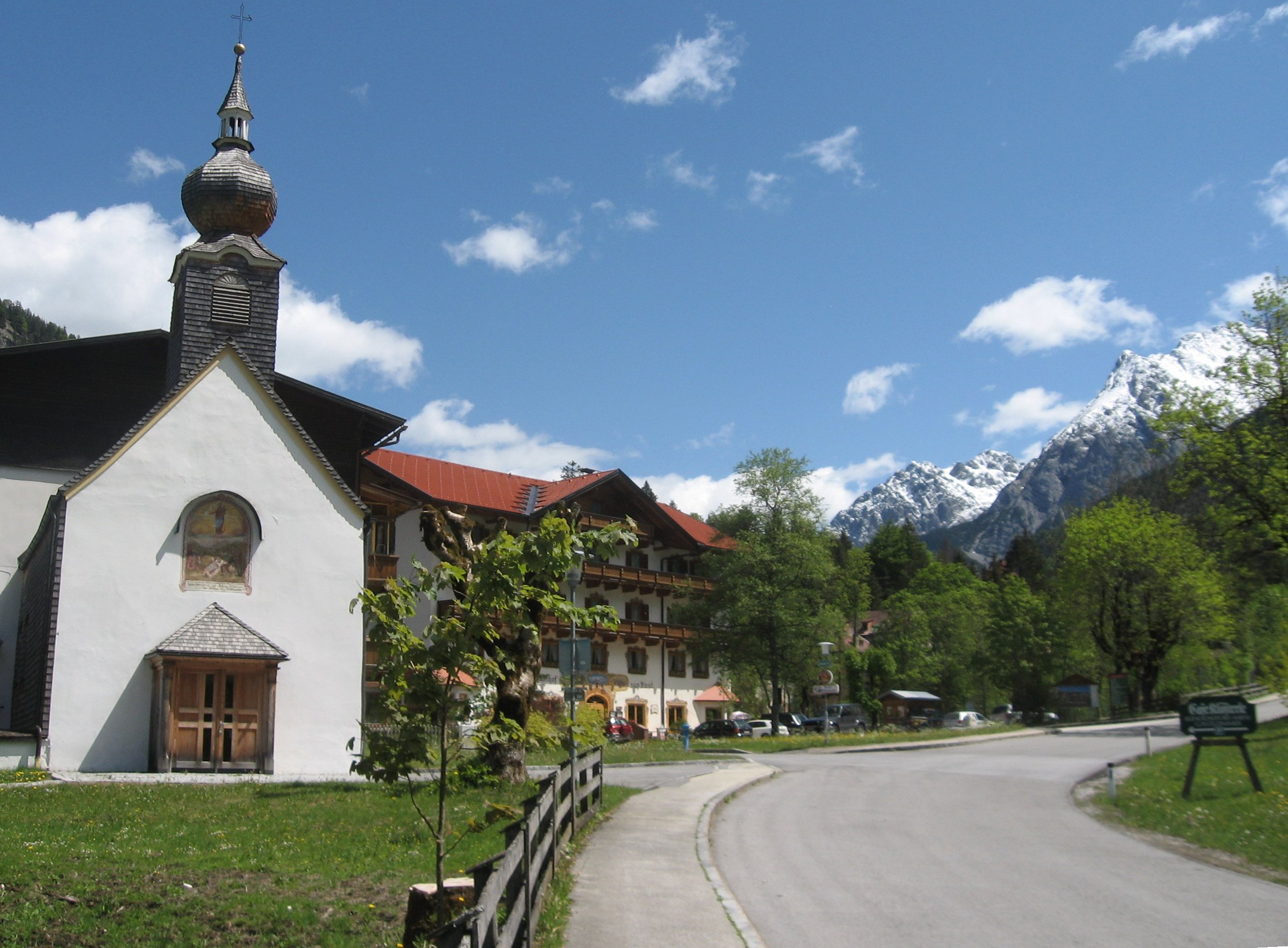
Hinterriß

Hinterriß is a Tyrolean village in Schwaz District, Austria, located at the Rißbach river at a height of 928 metres. Legally, Hinterriß is split up between the municipalities of Vomp and Eben am Achensee.

== Population ==
According to the 2001 census, Hinterriß had a total population of 41; 28 in the community of Vomp and 13 in Eben am Achensee. In 2010 3 buildings (2 inhabitants) were moved from Eben to Vomp .

== Geography ==
The Karwendel mountain range separates Hinterriß from the rest of Austria. The only road connection to Hinterriß leads through German territory, as such Hinterriß is considered a practical exclave. Unlike Jungholz and the Kleinwalsertal, Hinterriß never had a special status. The toll-free road connects Hinterriß with the German Vorderriß. In the other direction, a toll road of 15 km accessible only in summer connects Hinterriß with the small village of Eng at the end of the valley.

=== Ahornboden ===
At the end of the Rißbach valley, between 1080 and 1300m just before the village of Eng in the municipal area of Vomp lies the "Große Ahornboden" ("large maple grove"). Humans settled here 4500 BC. In 1927, the maple trees were declared a natural monument, as one of the oldest protected areas of natural monuments in Tyrol.

During the Ice Age a classic U-shaped valley was formed, and the valley bottom of the Enger Grundbach was filled with 80 to 120 meters of gravel, which is continuing to accumulate in large quantities due to erosion. the sycamore maple was able to make optimum use of these conditions due to its special root system. The removal of conifers, bushes, etc., was probably due to alpine farming since the 12th century. Thus, unique maple groves are a product of special natural conditions and traditional human use.

In December 1988, the Große Ahornboden was designated as Protected Landscape Area, which includes 267,28 Hectare It is also part of the Karwendel Nature Park. The area is overgrown with numerous 300 to 600 year old and very gnarled maple trees In 1966, 2409 trees were counted. The Großer Ahornboden is not only unique because of its large number of sycamores, but the old sycamores themselves are habitats for a large number of mosses, lichens and ferns. In 2019, 215 moss and lichen species could be detected at the Großer Ahornboden, amongst them the protected moss Tayloria rudolphiana. From a zoological point of view, the old trees are very attractive for cave breeders such as woodpeckers and bats.

The "Kleine Ahornboden" is located at the southern end of the Johannestal at around 1400 metres altitude directly below the steeply sloping north faces of the Hinterautal-Vomper Chain. It can be reached on foot in about 2.5 hours from Hinterriß and in about 2 hours from Karwendelhaus.

== History ==
As early as 1484, iron ore deposits were discovered, which since have been mined and smelted locally in a smelter. In 1544, the mining industry came into the possession of Fugger. The miners built a small chapel "Maria auf der Schmelz", which over time became the destination of a lively pilgrimage, especially from the Bavarian region.

Until 1822, Hinterriß belonged to the Diocese of Freising and only then came to the Diocese of Brixen. At the request of the Bressanone Ordinariate the Franciscan Monastery of Schwaz took over the pastoral care temporarily. In 1831, they took over the Expositur with two fathers and a lay brother. The settlement at that time consisted of church and Widum;including stable and barn as well as a forester’s house and individual scattered buildings and pastures in the area.

Tourism began in the middle of the 19th century. Prince Karl, Prince of Leiningen (1804–1856) renewed the roads to Hinterriß and built a hunting lodge near the church, which in 1859 was taken over by Ernest II, Duke of Saxe-Coburg and Gotha.

As of March 1928, an oil shale mine of 36 hectares was out of operation.

On 6 June 2009, the Nature Park House was inaugurated as the information centre of the Karwendel Alpine Park.
