= Alexander, Prince of Erbach-Schönberg =

2nd Prince of Erbach-Schönberg

Alexander
- Prince of Erbach-Schönberg
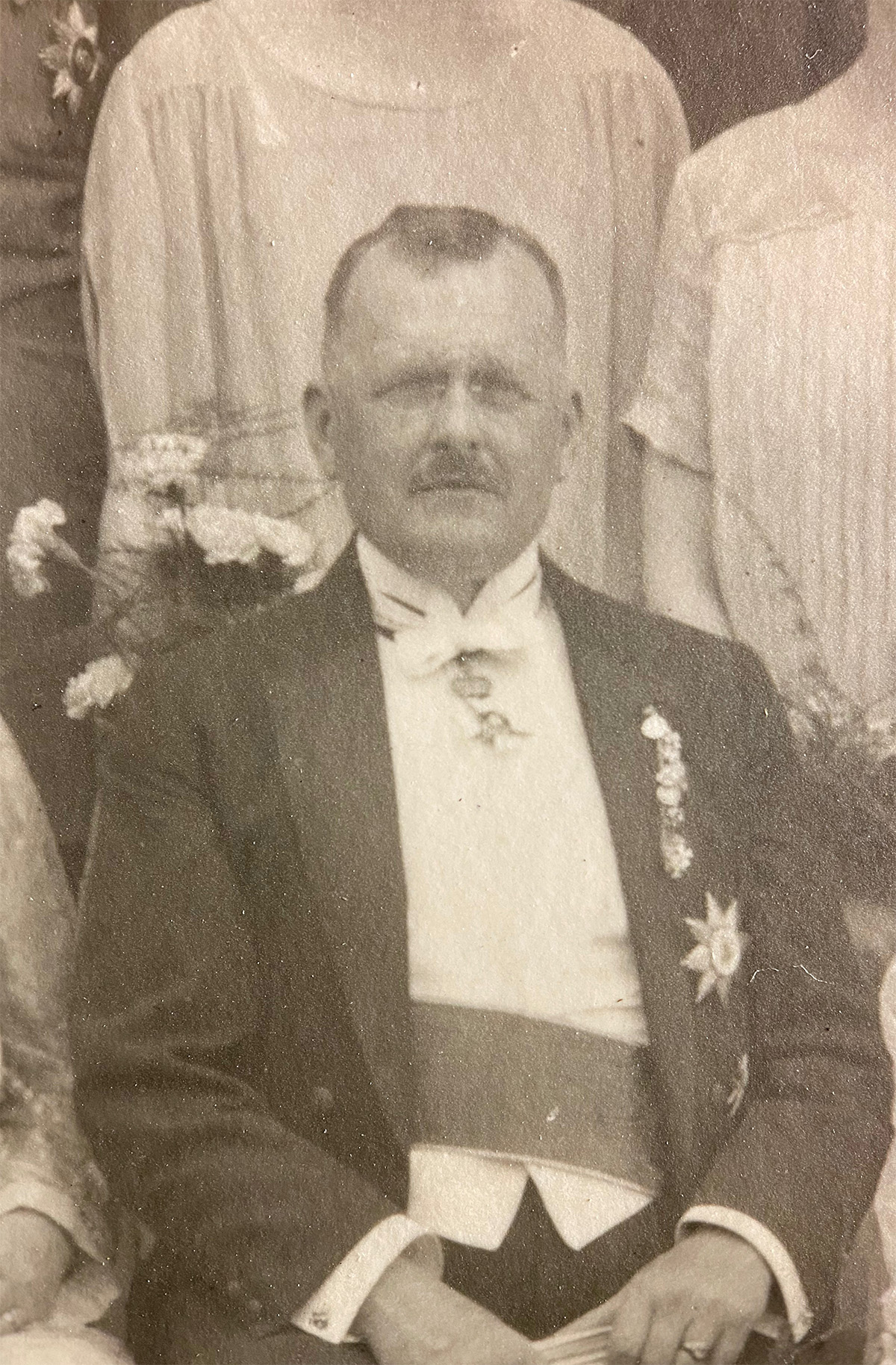
- Alexander in 1925
- Born: 12 September 1872; Schönberg, Grand Duchy of Hesse
- Died: 18 October 1944 (aged 72); Bensheim, Nazi Germany
- Spouse: Princess Elisabeth of Waldeck and Pyrmont (m. 1900)
- Issue: Princess Imma, Baroness of Dornberg; George Louis, Prince of Erbach-Schönberg; Prince William; Princess Helena
Names
- Alexander Louis Alfred Eberhard
- House: Erbach-Schönberg
- Father: Gustav, Prince of Erbach-Schönberg
- Mother: Princess Marie of Battenberg

Alexander, Prince of Erbach-Schönberg (German: Alexander Ludwig Alfred Eberhard, Fürst & Graf zu Erbach-Schönberg; 12 September 1872 –18 October 1944) was the 2nd Prince of Erbach-Schönberg, eldest son of Gustav, 1st Prince of Erbach-Schönberg.

== Early life ==
Alexander was the eldest child of Gustav, Prince of Erbach-Schönberg (August 17, 1840 – January 29, 1908), and his wife, Princess Marie of Battenberg (1852–1923), daughter of Prince Alexander of Hesse and by Rhine and his morganatic wife Countess Julia Hauke. As a result of a morganatic marriage, his mother and her siblings were excluded from the succession of the Grand Duchy of Hesse, and bore the title Princes of Battenberg.

Among others, he was a first cousin of:

- Alice, Princess Andrew of Greece and Denmark (1885–1969), mother of Prince Philip, Duke of Edinburgh and grandmother of Charles III of the United Kingdom.
- Queen Victoria Eugenie of Spain (1887–1969), who married Alfonso XIII of Spain; great-grandmother of Felipe VI.
- Queen Louise of Sweden (1889–1965), who married Gustaf VI Adolf of Sweden; stepgrandmother of Carl XVI Gustaf.
- Louis Mountbatten, 1st Earl Mountbatten of Burma (1900–1979), last Viceroy of India.

== Marriage and family ==
Alexander married on 3 May 1900 in Arolsen, Princess Elisabeth of Waldeck and Pyrmont (1873–1961), seventh child and youngest daughter of George Victor, Prince of Waldeck and Pyrmont and Princess Helena of Nassau.

They had four children, nine grandchildren, seventeen great-grandchildren and nineteen great-great-grandchildren:

- Princess Imma Gustava Marie Louise Pauline Edda Adolphine Hermine of Erbach-Schönberg (11 May 1901 – 14 March 1947) she married Hans Karl Baron von Dornberg on 31 May 1923. She remarried Captain Neil Boyd Watson McEacharn on 1 July 1940 and they were divorced in 1947.
- George Louis, Prince of Erbach-Schönberg (1 January 1903 – 27 January 1971) he married Marie-Marguerite von Deringer on 2 July 1925. They had three children, eleven grandchildren and seven great-grandchildren.
- Prince William Ernst Heinrich Alfred of Erbach-Schönberg (4 June 1904 – 27 September 1946) he married Countess Alexandra von Gortz on 4 October 1938. They had one daughter Marianne who died at birth.
- Princess Helena Sophie Louise Hedwig Emilie Martha of Erbach-Schönberg (8 April 1907 – 16 April 1979), unmarried and without issue.

== Orders and decorations ==
- Grand Duchy of Hesse:
  - Wedding Medal of Grand Duke Ernst Ludwig and Grand Duchess Victoria Melita, 1894
  - Grand Cross of the Merit Order of Philip the Magnanimous, 25 November 1901
- Baden: Grand Cross of the Order of the Zähringer Lion
- Kingdom of Prussia: Kaiser Wilhelm I Memorial Medal, 22 March 1897
- Württemberg: Grand Cross of the Friedrich Order, 1900
- Principality of Bulgaria: Grand Cross of the Order of Saint Alexander
- Principality of Montenegro: Grand Cross of the Order of Prince Danilo I
- Netherlands:
  - Wedding Medal of Queen Wilhelmina and Duke Henry of Mecklenburg-Schwerin, 1901
  - Grand Cross of the Order of the Netherlands Lion
- Russian Empire: Knight of the Imperial Order of Saint Prince Vladimir, 4th Class

== Ancestry ==
Ancestors of Alexander, Prince of Erbach-Schönberg

8. Count Gustav Ernst of Erbach-Schönberg
4. Ludewig III, Count of Erbach-Schönberg
9. Countess Henriette Christiane of Stolberg-Stolberg
2. Gustav, Prince of Erbach-Schönberg
10. Count Johann Bertram of Gronsfeld-Diepenbroick
5. Countess Karoline Wilhelmine of Gronsfeld-Diepenbroick
11. Princess Friederike of Löwenstein-Wertheim-Freudenberg
1. Alexander, Prince of Erbach-Schönberg
12. Louis II, Grand Duke of Hesse and by Rhine
6. Prince Alexander of Hesse and by Rhine
13. Princess Wilhelmine of Baden
3. Princess Marie of Battenberg
14. Count John Maurice Hauke
7. Julia, Princess of Battenberg
15. Sophie Lafontaine

== Notes and sources ==
- Genealogisches Handbuch des Adels, Fürstliche Häuser, Reference: 1956
- The Royal House of Stuart, London, 1969, 1971, 1976, Addington, A. C., Reference: II 351

Alexander, Prince of Erbach-Schönberg House of Erbach-Schönberg Cadet branch of the House of Erbach Born: 12 September 1872 Died: 18 October 1944
German nobility
Preceded by Gustav	Prince of Erbach-Schönberg; 1908–1919	Succeeded by German nobility titles abolished
Titles in pretence
Loss of title	— TITULAR — Prince of Erbach-Schönberg; 1919 – 1944; Reason for succession failure: German nobility titles abolished	Succeeded by George Louis
