= George Victor, Prince of Waldeck and Pyrmont =

Prince of Waldeck and Pyrmont from 1845 to 1893

George Victor
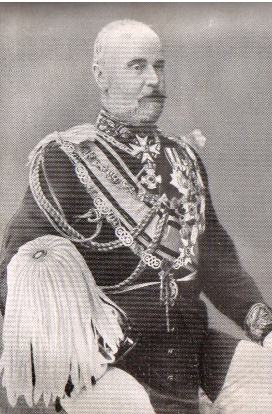
- George Victor, 1875–1893

Prince of Waldeck and Pyrmont
- Reign: 15 May 1845 – 12 May 1893
- Predecessor: George II
- Successor: Friedrich
- Born: 14 January 1831; Arolsen, Waldeck and Pyrmont
- Died: 12 May 1893 (aged 62); Marienbad, Kingdom of Bohemia
- Burial: 23 May 1893; Fuerstliches Erbbegraebnis, Rhoden
- Spouse: Princess Helena of Nassau (m. 1853; died 1888) Princess Louise of Schleswig-Holstein-Sonderburg-Glücksburg (m. 1891)
- Issue: Princess Sophie; Pauline, Princess of Bentheim and Steinfurt; Marie, Crown Princess of Württemberg; Emma, Queen of the Netherlands; Princess Helen, Duchess of Albany; Friedrich, Prince of Waldeck and Pyrmont; Elisabeth, Princess of Erbach-Schönberg; Prince Wolrad
- House: Waldeck and Pyrmont
- Father: George II, Prince of Waldeck and Pyrmont
- Mother: Princess Emma of Anhalt-Bernburg-Schaumburg-Hoym

George Victor (14 January 1831 – 12 May 1893) was the 3rd sovereign Prince of the German state of Waldeck and Pyrmont.

He was born in Bad Arolsen, the son of George II, Prince of Waldeck and Pyrmont, and Princess Emma of Anhalt-Bernburg-Schaumburg-Hoym. He succeeded as prince originally under the guardianship of his mother in 1845 following the death of his father.

He died of pneumonia in Marienbad, Bohemia, in 1893 and was succeeded by his eldest son, Friedrich.

== Family ==
George Victor was first married on 26 September 1853 in Wiesbaden to Princess Helena of Nassau, daughter of William, Duke of Nassau. They had seven children:

- Princess Sophie (27 July 1854 – 5 August 1869); died of tuberculosis at 15.
- Princess Pauline (19 October 1855 – 3 July 1925), who married Alexis, Prince of Bentheim and Steinfurt.
- Princess Marie (23 May 1857 – 30 April 1882), who married Prince William, later King William II of Württemberg.
- Princess Emma (2 August 1858 – 20 March 1934), who married King William III of the Netherlands. Via this marriage, George Victor is an ancestor to the Dutch royal family.
- Princess Helen (17 February 1861 – 1 September 1922), who married British Prince Leopold, Duke of Albany. Amongst her children was Charles Edward, last reigning Duke of Saxe-Coburg and Gotha. Via this marriage, George Victor is an ancestor to the Swedish royal family.
- Prince Friedrich (20 January 1865 – 26 May 1946), the last reigning prince of Waldeck and Pyrmont; married Princess Bathildis of Schaumburg-Lippe.
- Princess Elisabeth (6 September 1873 – 23 November 1961), who married Alexander, Prince of Erbach-Schönberg.

His second marriage took place in Luisenlund on 29 April 1891 to Princess Louise of Schleswig-Holstein-Sonderburg-Glücksburg. From this marriage, he had one son:

- Prince Wolrad (26 June 1892 – 17 October 1914), who was killed in action shortly after the outbreak of World War I.

== Orders and decorations ==
- Ascanian duchies: Grand Cross of the Order of Albert the Bear, 30 November 1848
- Oldenburg: Grand Cross of the House and Merit Order of Duke Peter Friedrich Ludwig, with Golden Crown, 12 August 1845
- (Saxe-Coburg and Gotha) (Duchy of Saxe-Altenburg) (Saxe-Meiningen) Ernestine duchies: Grand Cross of the Saxe-Ernestine House Order, August 1852
- Grand Duchy of Hesse: Grand Cross of the Grand Ducal Hessian Order of Ludwig, 3 April 1853
- Nassau: Knight of the Order of the Gold Lion of the House of Nassau, April 1859
- Kingdom of Prussia:
  - Knight of the Order of the Black Eagle, 1 February 1868
  - Grand Commander's Cross of the Royal House Order of Hohenzollern, 5 December 1878
- Sweden-Norway:
  - Grand Cross of the Royal Norwegian Order of Saint Olav, 5 September 1861
  - Knight of the Royal Order of the Seraphim, 8 October 1872
- Württemberg: Grand Cross of the Order of the Württemberg Crown, 1872
- Baden: Knight of the House Order of Fidelity, 1874
- United Kingdom: Honorary Knight Grand Cross (civil division) of the Most Honourable Order of the Bath, 1882

George Victor, Prince of Waldeck and Pyrmont House of Waldeck and Pyrmont Cadet branch of the House of Waldeck Born: 14 January 1831 Died: 12 May 1893
Regnal titles
Preceded by George II	Prince of Waldeck and Pyrmont; 15 May 1845 – 12 May 1893	Succeeded by Friedrich
