= Emma of Waldeck and Pyrmont =

Queen of the Netherlands from 1879 to 1890

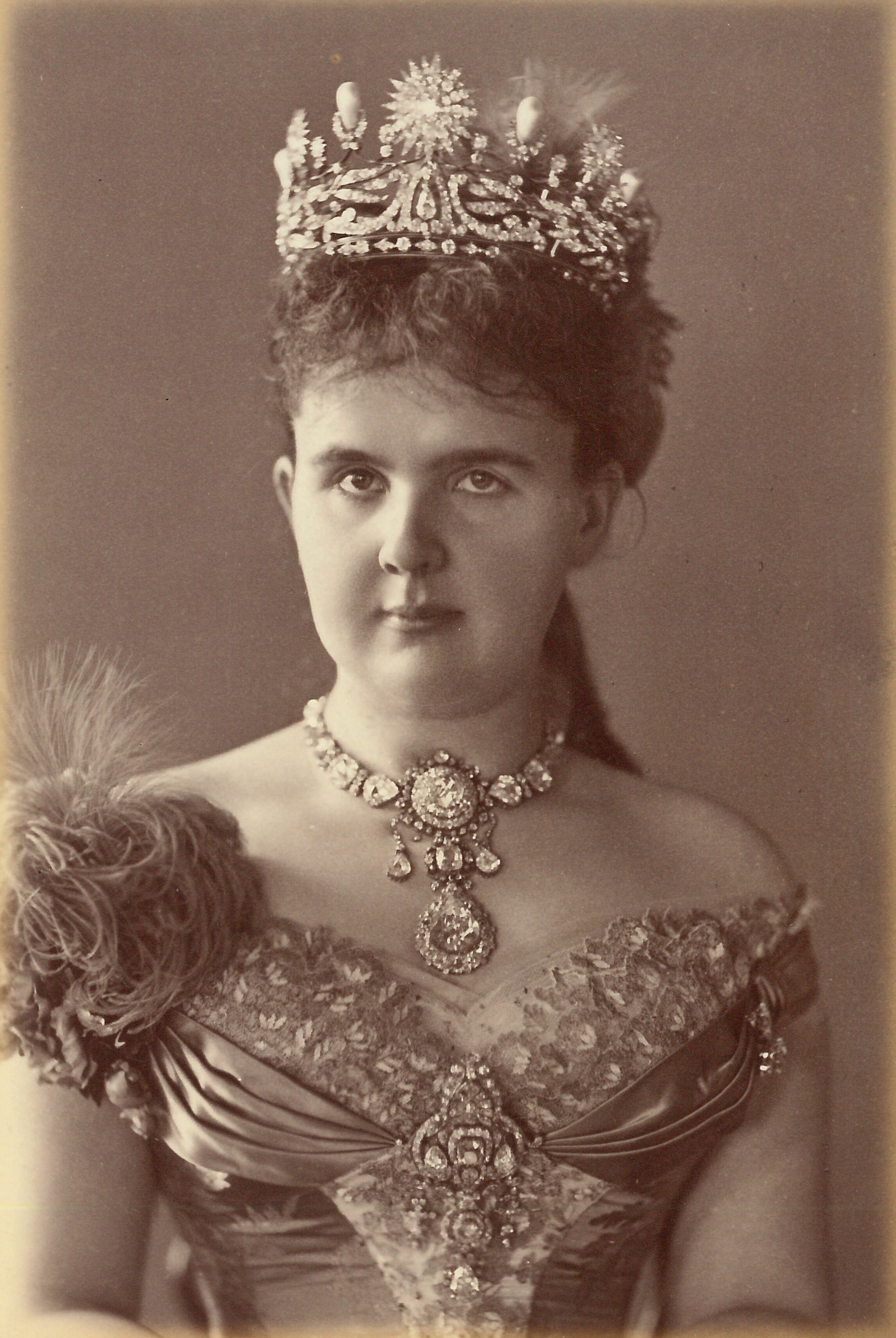
- Formal portrait c. 1882

Queen consort of the Netherlands Grand Duchess consort of Luxembourg
- Tenure: 7 January 1879 – 23 November 1890

Queen regent of the Netherlands
- Regency: 20 November 1890 – 6 September 1898
- Monarchs: William III; Wilhelmina
- Born: 2 August 1858; Arolsen Castle, Arolsen, Waldeck and Pyrmont, German Confederation
- Died: 20 March 1934 (aged 75); Lange Voorhout Palace, The Hague, Netherlands
- Burial: Nieuwe Kerk, Delft, Netherlands
- Spouse: William III of the Netherlands (m. 1879; died 1890)
- Issue: Wilhelmina of the Netherlands
Names
- Adelheid Emma Wilhelmina Theresia
- House: Waldeck and Pyrmont
- Father: George Victor, Prince of Waldeck and Pyrmont
- Mother: Princess Helena of Nassau

Emma of Waldeck and Pyrmont (Adelheid Emma Wilhelmina Theresia; 2 August 1858 – 20 March 1934) was Queen of the Netherlands and Grand Duchess of Luxembourg as the wife of King-Grand Duke William III. An immensely popular member of the Dutch Royal Family, Queen Emma served as regent for her daughter, Queen Wilhelmina, during the latter's minority from 1890 until 1898.

== Early life ==
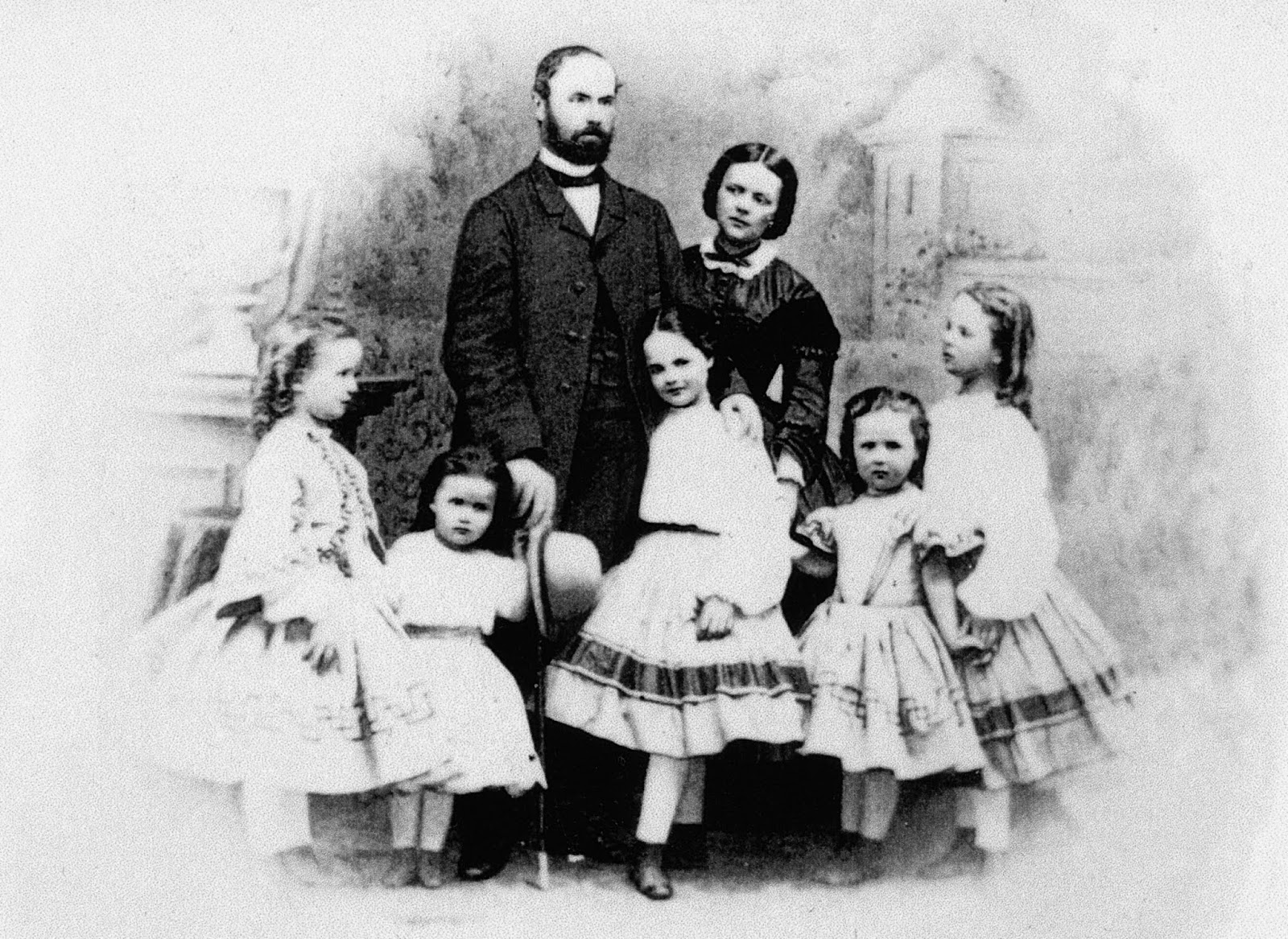
Emma with her family ca. 1864

Emma was born a princess of Waldeck and Pyrmont on 2 August 1858 in Arolsen Castle in Arolsen, the capital of the small German principality of Waldeck and Pyrmont. She was the fourth daughter of Georg Viktor, Prince of Waldeck and Pyrmont, and Princess Helena of Nassau-Weilburg. Her brother, Prince Friedrich I, was the last reigning prince of Waldeck and Pyrmont. Her sister, Princess Helena, was the wife of Prince Leopold, Duke of Albany, the youngest son of Queen Victoria.

Her maternal grandfather was Wilhelm I, Duke of Nassau, a grandson of Princess Carolina of Orange-Nassau, through which she inherited a place in the line of succession to the Dutch Crown until 1887.

Emma had a religious education from a very liberal-minded pastor. With her English governess, Emma studied crafts, drawing, and French literature. Her upbringing has been described as fairly informal, though with a focus on a sense of duty. She was given an interest in social work early on due to the charity work she became involved in already as young, and an interest in medical work due to the illness of her eldest sister, who suffered from tuberculosis. Emma was described as tactful, sensible, and engaging.

== Queen of the Netherlands ==
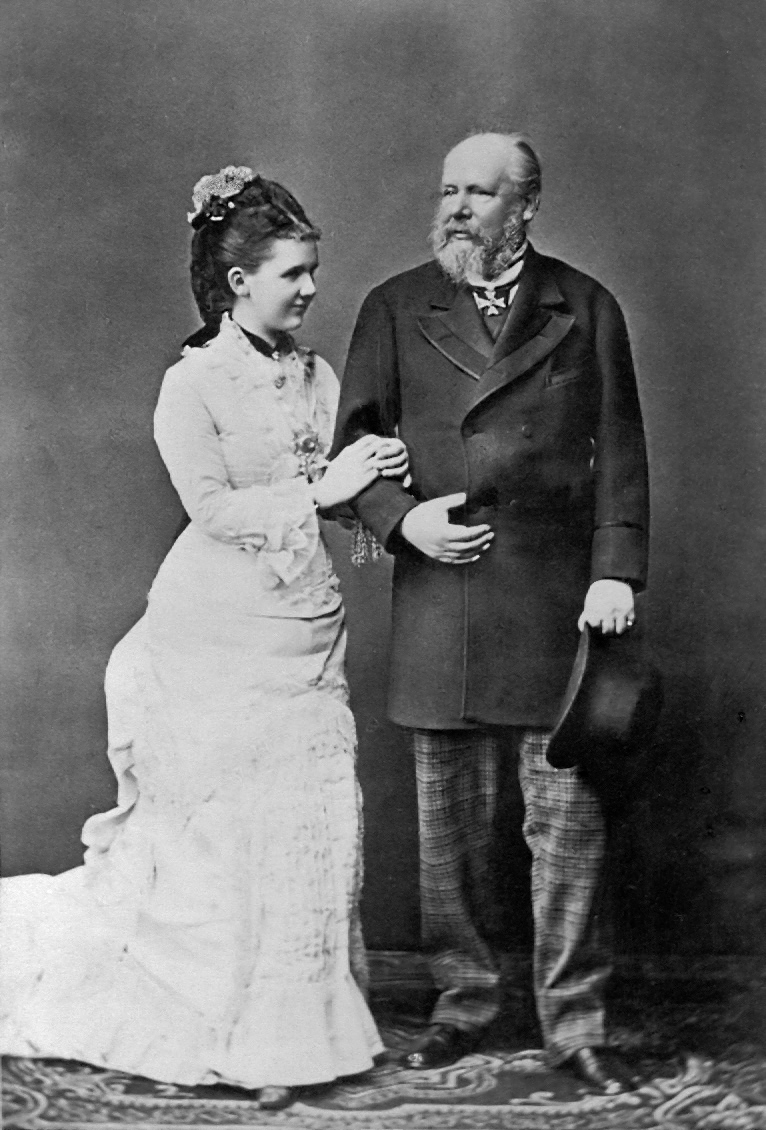
Wilhelm III and Queen Emma

Princess Emma married the much older King William III at Arolsen Castle on 7 January 1879, two years after the death of his first wife, Sophie of Württemberg. The king, born in 1817, was no less than forty-one years older than Emma; indeed, all three of his children from his first marriage were older than her. Two of his three sons were still alive at the time of Emma's wedding, and the match was not motivated by the need to produce an heir. The marriage was suggested during William's visit to Pyrmont in 1878. Emma was one of several daughters of a minor German prince, with very moderate marriage prospects, and her parents were enthused by the idea that their daughter would become a queen on her wedding day. Emma, raised in a loving and conservative family, acceded to the wishes of her beloved parents without demur. Immediately after the engagement, she began receiving lessons in the Dutch language.

The king had three sons from his first marriage, William, Maurice, and Alexander, the youngest of whom was seven years older than Emma. Maurice had died in childhood, but the other two were alive to receive their step-mother. Six months after the wedding, Crown Prince William died in France of a combination of typhus, and liver complaints (excessive indulgence in drink). The King's youngest son, Alexander, then became heir apparent.

In August 1880, Emma became a mother with the birth of what would be her only child, the future Queen Wilhelmina. When her last surviving stepson Alexander, Prince of Orange, died in 1884, her daughter became heiress to the throne. This changed Emma's position, since it was likely that her daughter would succeed while yet a minor, in which case Emma herself would be regent during the minority.

After the death of his youngest son, the king retired from public life due to his health conditions, and Emma undertook the task of nursing him.

== Regency ==
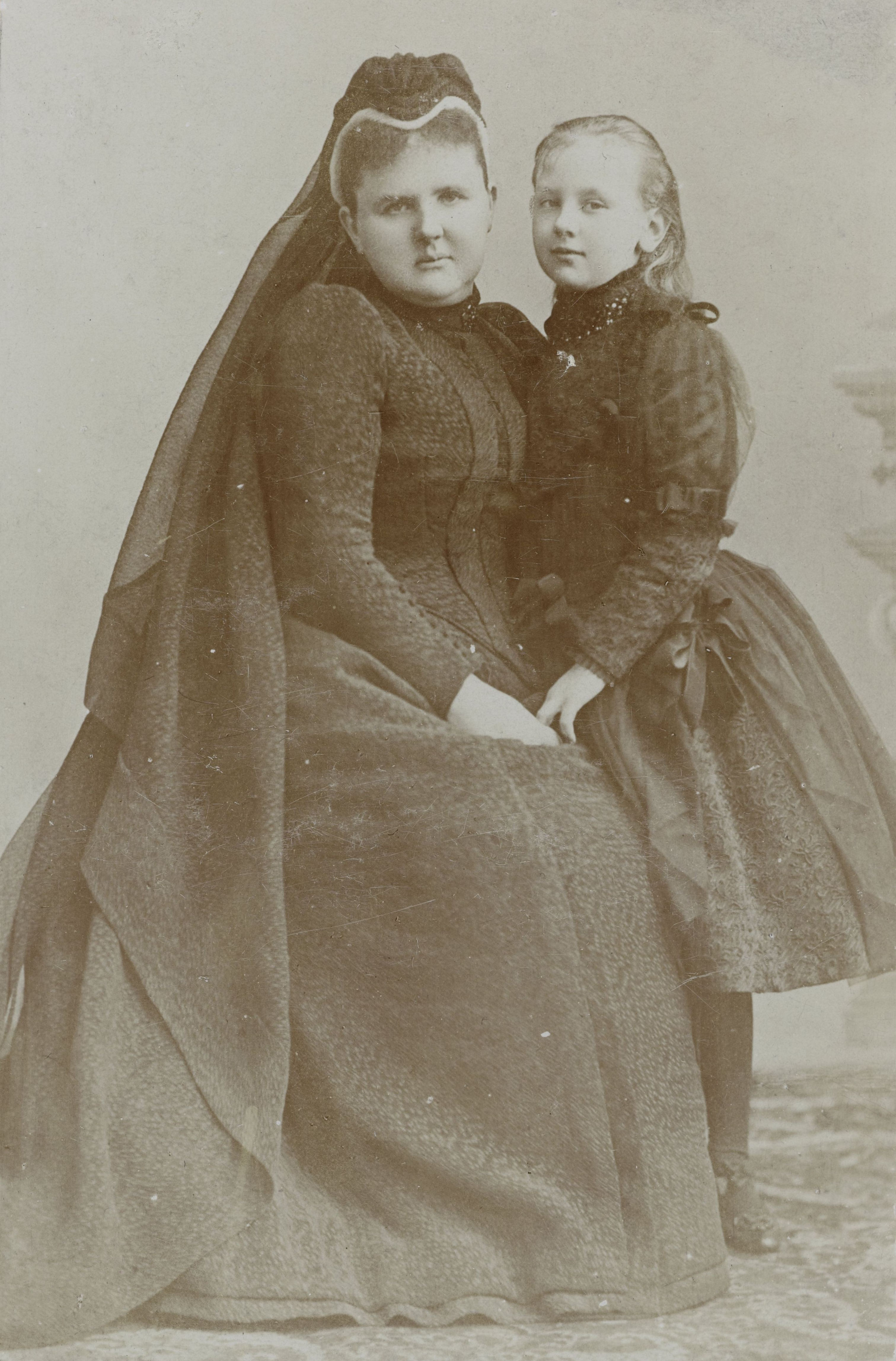
Emma and Wilhelmina in 1890

Three days before William died on 23 November 1890, Emma became regent for her incapacitated husband. She continued her regency until Wilhelmina's eighteenth birthday on 31 August 1898. The Grand Duchy of Luxembourg, the crown of which according to the House-Treaty should not be inherited by a woman, passed to Adolf, Duke of Nassau, who happened to be Queen Emma's maternal uncle.

Emma was the first woman to rule The Netherlands since Princess Carolina of Orange-Nassau a century before, and the first woman to rule the Kingdom of the Netherlands. She took her position of regent seriously. Her task was not simple, since William had antagonized many politicians with his autocratic ways. She managed to establish better relations between the royal house and the political world fairly quickly with good advisors, particularly Jonkheer Joan Röell and Jonkheer Gerlach Cornelis Joannes van Reenen. She had meetings with every government minister at least once every two weeks to keep herself informed of all political issues, and strictly adhered to the rules of the constitutional monarchy. She used the trust she gained by respecting the constitutional forms and her influence on political issues she cared about, which resulted in compromises where she often managed to get her way. One statesman commented that Emma was efficient because she combined a strong will with soft forms, something they had not been used to.

As regent, Emma presided over three cabinets. In 1891, Emma refused to appoint the suggested minister Johannes Tak van Poortvliet, with whom she had a tense relationship, in favor of Gijsbert van Tienhoven. In 1894 she was convinced by Tak van Poortvliet to dissolve Parliament. When a new cabinet was to be sworn in, she refused until she had read and approved of their political program. In 1897, she demanded that both the Liberal parties were to be included in the new cabinet and the Aceh War was to continue, before she agreed to have the new government sworn in. She wrote and delivered her speeches in Dutch, and engaged herself in the Dutch Colonial Empire, attending the military parades and celebrations associated with Imperial achievements.

In addition to her administrative duties, Emma paid great attention to the education of her daughter. When Wilhelmina reached the age of 16, Emma considered her childhood over and Wilhelmina spent the next two years being prepared for her job as a reigning queen. During her government, she took Wilhelmina on tours through the provinces to visit local charities, hospitals, churches and factories and acquaint Wilhelmina with her future duties.

== Queen Mother ==
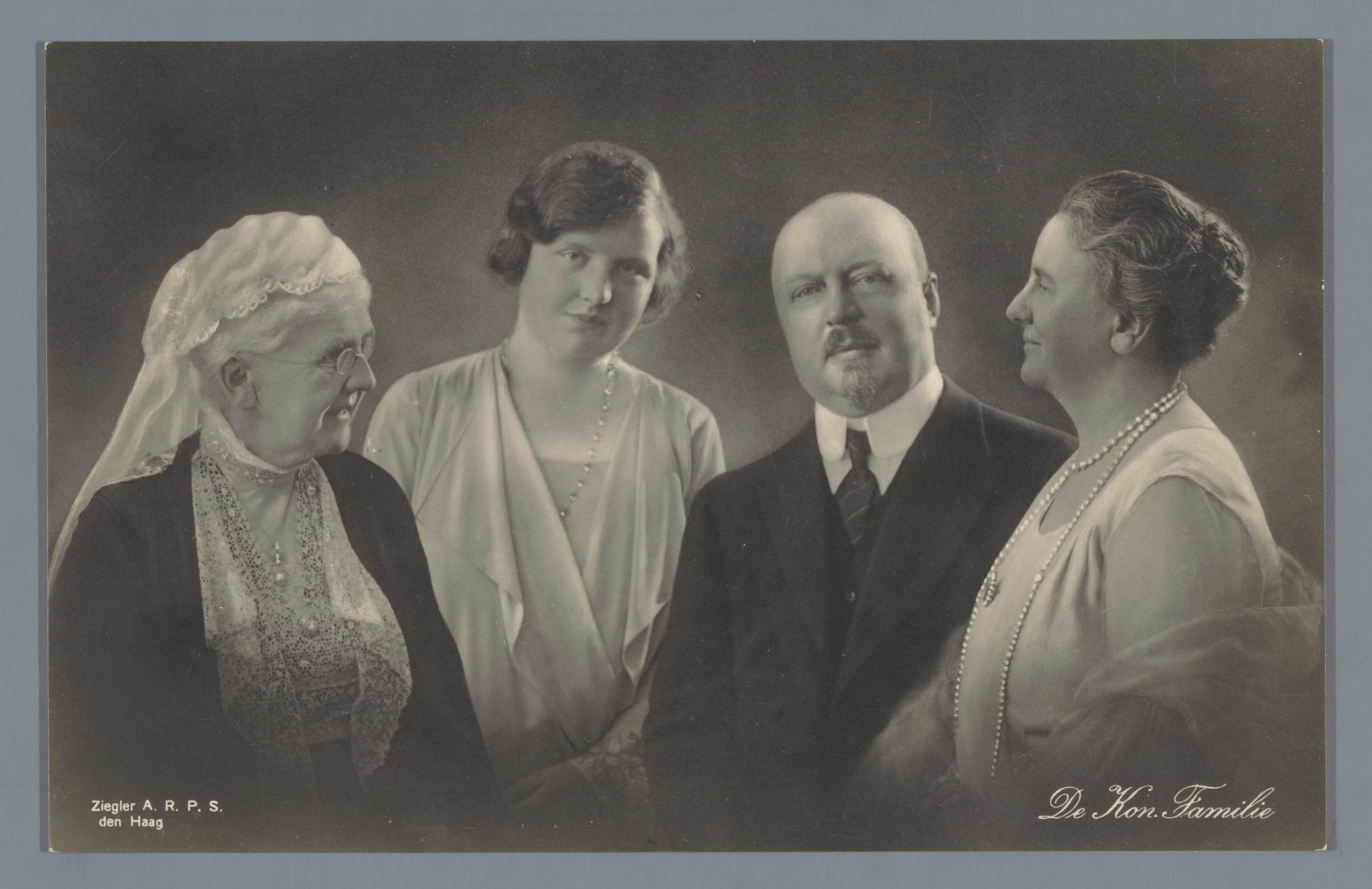
Emma, Juliana, Henry, and Wilhelmina in 1929

On 31 August 1898 her daughter, Queen Wilhelmina, reached legal majority and Queen Emma thereby retired from regency on Wilhelmina's inauguration on 6 September. In her farewell speech as Regent, she expressed her wish that the Netherlands should continue to be great in the way small nations could show greatness.

Emma continued to live with her daughter until Wilhelmina's marriage to Henry of Mecklenburg in 1901, after which she moved to her own residence Lange Voorhout Palace in The Hague. When her granddaughter Juliana was born in 1909, it was declared that in case Juliana succeeded to the throne as a minor, her grandmother Emma should be regent rather than her father.

As Queen Mother, Emma continued to attend to public royal representational duties, supporting her daughter and son-in-law, and was a well known figure in her black widow’s lace. She was called "queen of charity" and especially engaged in improvement of the conditions for those suffering from tuberculosis. She retired from public life when her granddaughter Juliana was declared adult and started to participate in public duties in 1927.

The Queen Mother died in The Hague on 20 March 1934, of complications from bronchitis at the age of 75, and was buried in the Nieuwe Kerk in Delft.

== Honours and arms ==
Coat of arms of Queen Emma

National orders and decorations

- Grand Cross of the Order of the Netherlands Lion
- Grand Cross of the Order of Orange-Nassau
- Grand Cross of the Order of the House of Orange
- Cross of Merit of the Red Cross

Foreign orders and decorations

- (Austrian Empire) Austro-Hungarian Imperial and Royal Family: Grand Cross of the Imperial Austrian Order of Elizabeth, 1901
- Belgium: Grand Cordon of the Order of Leopold (civil division), August 1898
- France: Grand Cross of the National Order of the Legion of Honour, December 1896
- (German Empire) German Imperial and Royal Family: Dame of the Order of Louise, 1st Division, 30 May 1892
  - Mecklenburg Grand Ducal Family: Grand Cross of the House Order of the Wendish Crown
- Empire of Japan: Grand Cordon of the Order of the Precious Crown, 18 June 1898
- Persian Imperial Family: Order of the Sun, 1st Class
- (Kingdom of Portugal) Portuguese Royal Family: Dame of the Order of Queen Saint Isabel
- (Russian Empire) Russian Imperial Family: Grand Cross of the Imperial Order of Saint Catherine
- Spain: 812th Dame of the Order of Queen Maria Luisa, 29 March 1880
- (Thailand) Siam: Dame of the Order of the Royal House of Chakri, 7 September 1897
- (Ottoman Empire) Turkish Imperial Family: Grand Cordon of the Order of Charity

== Ancestry ==
Ancestors of Emma of Waldeck and Pyrmont

8. George I, Prince of Waldeck and Pyrmont
4. George II, Prince of Waldeck and Pyrmont
9. Princess Augusta of Schwarzburg-Sondershausen
2. George Victor, Prince of Waldeck and Pyrmont
10. Victor II, Prince of Anhalt-Bernburg-Schaumburg-Hoym
5. Princess Emma of Anhalt-Bernburg-Schaumburg-Hoym
11. Princess Amelia of Nassau-Weilburg
1. Emma of Waldeck and Pyrmont
12. Frederick William, Prince of Nassau-Weilburg
6. William, Duke of Nassau
13. Burgravine Louise Isabelle of Kirchberg
3. Princess Helena of Nassau
14. Prince Paul of Württemberg
7. Princess Pauline of Württemberg
15. Princess Charlotte of Saxe-Hildburghausen

Emma of Waldeck and Pyrmont House of Waldeck and Pyrmont Cadet branch of the House of Waldeck Born: 2 August 1858 Died: 20 March 1934
Royal titles
Vacant Title last held by Sophie of Württemberg	Queen consort of the Netherlands; 1879–1890	Vacant Title next held by Henry of Mecklenburg-Schwerin as Prince consort
Vacant Title last held by Sophie of Württemberg	Grand Duchess consort of Luxembourg; 1879–1890	Succeeded by Adelheid-Marie of Anhalt-Dessau
