= Friedrich, Prince of Waldeck and Pyrmont =

German prince (1865–1946)

Friedrich I
- Friedrich in 1907

Prince of Waldeck and Pyrmont
- Reign: 12 May 1893 – 13 November 1918
- Predecessor: Prince Georg Victor
- Successor: Monarchy abolished
- Born: 20 January 1865; Arolsen, Waldeck and Pyrmont
- Died: 26 May 1946 (aged 81); Arolsen, Allied-occupied Germany
- Spouse: Princess Bathildis of Schaumburg-Lippe (m. 1895)
- Issue: Josias, Hereditary Prince of Waldeck and Pyrmont; Prince Maximilian; Helena, Hereditary Grand Duchess of Oldenburg; Prince Georg
- House: Waldeck and Pyrmont
- Father: George Victor, Prince of Waldeck and Pyrmont
- Mother: Princess Helena of Nassau
- Education: University of Göttingen, Leipzig University
- Military career
- Allegiance: German Empire

Friedrich, Prince of Waldeck and Pyrmont (Friedrich Adolf Hermann Fürst zu Waldeck und Pyrmont; 20 January 1865 – 26 May 1946) was the last reigning Prince of Waldeck and Pyrmont from 12 May 1893 to 13 November 1918.

== Early life, family and education ==
Friedrich was born on 20 January 1865 in Arolsen, Principality of Waldeck and Pyrmont during the reign of his father George Victor, Prince of Waldeck and Pyrmont. He was the only son and sixth child of George Victor and his first wife Princess Helena of Nassau. He was a brother of the Dutch Queen consort Emma and Princess Helena, Duchess of Albany.

His maternal grandparents were William, Duke of Nassau and his second wife Princess Pauline of Württemberg. Pauline was a daughter of Prince Paul of Württemberg and his wife Charlotte of Saxe-Hildburghausen. Paul was a son of Frederick I of Württemberg and his wife Duchess Augusta of Brunswick-Wolfenbüttel. Augusta was the eldest daughter of Karl Wilhelm Ferdinand, Duke of Brunswick-Lüneburg and Princess Augusta of Great Britain, elder sister of George III of the United Kingdom.

Friedrich studied law at both the University of Göttingen, and the Leipzig University. Following his time in university, Friedrich went on to serve in the Prussian army as part of the Guards Uhlan regiment.

== Reign ==
On 12 May 1893, Friedrich ascended to the throne upon the death of his father.

During World War I, he served in the Imperial German Army as a cavalry general. Germany would, however, lose the war and the German Revolution would force Friedrich to abdicate on 13 November 1918. However, he refused to sign an abdication agreement for some time before signing one that gave his family ownership over their home of Arolsen Castle and the surrounding Arolsen forest.

== Post-abdication ==
During the rule of Nazi Germany, neither Friedrich or his wife joined the Nazi party, though their eldest son did and became a general in the SS.

== Marriage and children ==
He married Princess Bathildis of Schaumburg-Lippe, the daughter of Prince William of Schaumburg-Lippe and his wife, Princess Bathildis of Anhalt-Dessau, in Náchod on 9 August 1895.

They had four children:

- Josias, Hereditary Prince of Waldeck and Pyrmont (b. 13 May 1896, d. 30 November 1967)
- Prince Maximilian Wilhelm Gustav Hermann of Waldeck and Pyrmont (b. 13 September 1898, d. 23 February 1981)
- Princess Helena of Waldeck and Pyrmont (b. 22 December 1899, d. 18 February 1948)
- Prince Georg Wilhelm Karl Victor of Waldeck and Pyrmont (b. 10 March 1902, d. 14 November 1971)

== Death ==
Prince Friedrich died on 26 May 1946 in Arolsen, Allied-occupied Germany, aged 81. His body was buried, alongside his wife Bathildis, in a Waldeck family Crypt in Rhoden, Harz, Germany.

== Honours and awards ==
- Württemberg: Grand Cross of the Order of the Württemberg Crown, 1889
- Kingdom of Prussia: Knight of the Order of the Red Eagle, 1st Class, 24 May 1890
- Kingdom of Romania: Grand Cross of the Order of the Crown of Romania
- Baden:
  - Knight of the House Order of Fidelity, 1893
  - Knight of the Order of Berthold the First, 1893
- Kingdom of Bavaria: Knight of the Royal Order of Saint Hubert, 1893
- Kingdom of Saxony: Knight of the Order of the Rue Crown, 1894
- Sweden-Norway:
  - Grand Cross of the Royal Norwegian Order of Saint Olav, 17 June 1894
  - Knight of the Royal Order of the Seraphim, 18 September 1897
- United Kingdom: Honorary Knight Grand Cross of the Most Honourable Order of the Bath (civil division), 26 April 1904

Friedrich, Prince of Waldeck and Pyrmont House of Waldeck and Pyrmont Cadet branch of the House of Waldeck Born: 20 January 1865 Died: 26 May 1946
Regnal titles
Preceded by Georg Victor	Prince of Waldeck and Pyrmont; 12 May 1893 – 13 November 1918	Monarchy abolished
Titles in pretence
Loss of title Republic declared	— TITULAR — Prince of Waldeck and Pyrmont; 13 November 1918 – 26 May 1946	Succeeded by Josias
