= Princess Emma of Anhalt-Bernburg-Schaumburg-Hoym =

Princess Emma
- Princess of Waldeck and Pyrmont
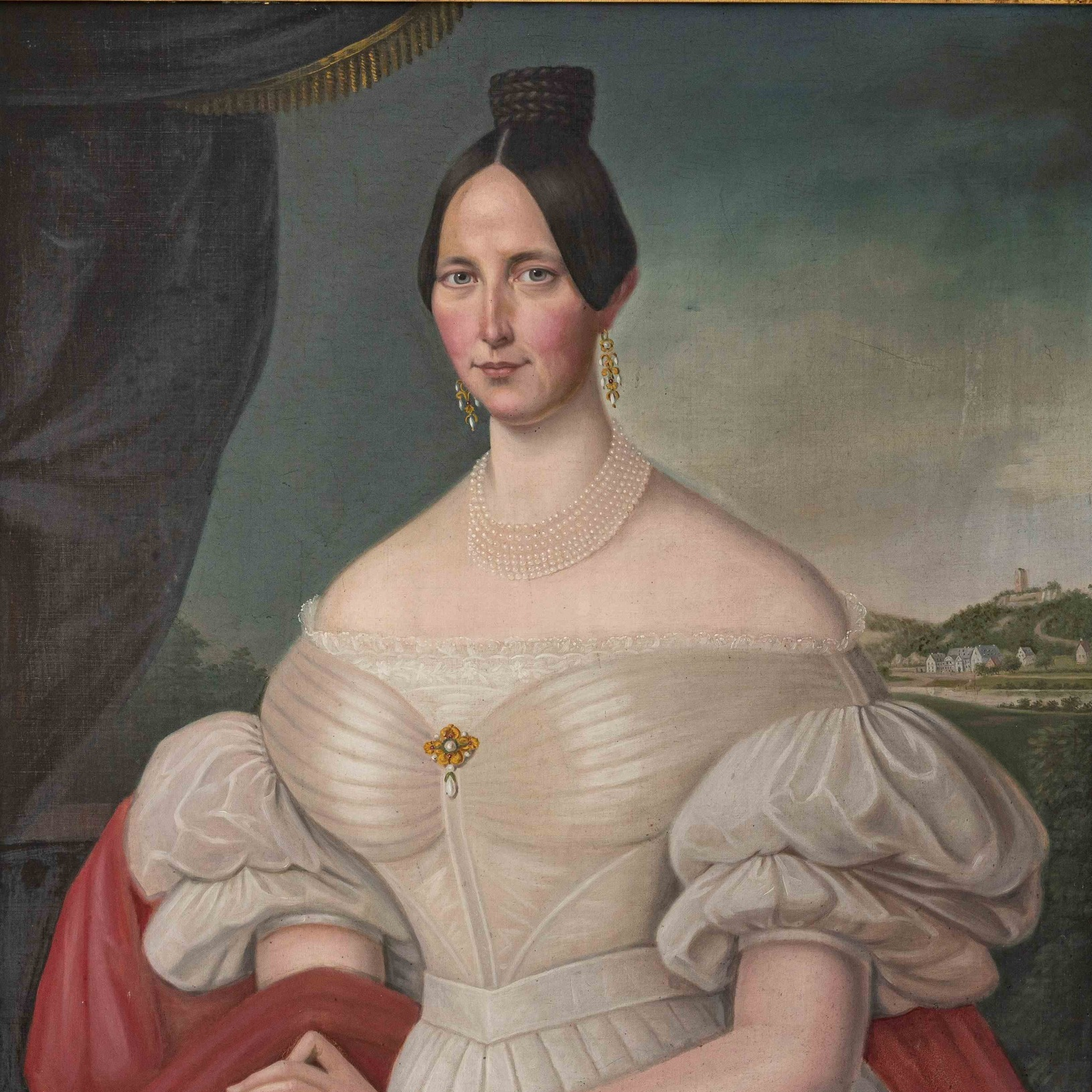
- 1836 portrait
- Born: 20 May 1802; Schaumburg Castle
- Died: 1 August 1858 (aged 56); Pyrmont
- Spouse: George II, Prince of Waldeck and Pyrmont (m. 1823; died 1845)
- Issue: Augusta, Princess of Stolberg-Stolberg; Joseph, Hereditary Prince of Waldeck and Pyrmont; Hermine, Princess of Schaumburg-Lippe; George Victor, Prince of Waldeck and Pyrmont; Prince Walrad
- House: Ascania
- Father: Victor II, Prince of Anhalt-Bernburg-Schaumburg-Hoym
- Mother: Princess Amelia of Nassau-Weilburg

Princess Emma of Anhalt-Bernburg-Schaumburg-Hoym (20 May 1802 – 1 August 1858) was a German princess who was the consort of George II, Prince of Waldeck and Pyrmont.

== Life ==
Emma was one of the four daughters of the prince Victor II, Prince of Anhalt-Bernburg-Schaumburg-Hoym from his marriage to Amelia of Nassau-Weilburg, daughter of Charles Christian, Prince of Nassau-Weilburg. She grew up with her sisters in Hoym in Anhalt and was carefully educated. Their great-uncle, Frederick, Prince of Anhalt-Bernburg-Schaumburg-Hoym, had waived his right of succession in Schaumburg and the County of Holzappel in 1811 in favour of his great-niece, but in 1828 this decision was overruled.

After her husband's death in 1845, she ruled Waldeck and Pyrmont as Regent for her minor son George Victor. Among her first acts was a reform of the Waldeck contingent of the federal army, implemented in 1845 by Prussian officers. The Revolutions of 1848 took place during Emma's reign; in Waldeck they led to a new parliament being convened. Emma's reign has been described as an important phase in the history of Waldeck, with a complete overhaul of the organisation of the state.

The Emma Waterfall in the Gastein Valley was named after her, as was her granddaughter Emma of Waldeck and Pyrmont, who served as queen regent of the Netherlands. A double thaler issued in 1847 was known as Fat Emma.

== Marriage and issue ==
Emma married on 26 June 1823 at Schaumburg Castle, George II, Prince of Waldeck and Pyrmont. The couple had five children:

- Princess Augusta of Waldeck-Pyrmont (1824–1893), married Prince Alfred of Stolberg-Stolberg (1820-1903) and had issue
- Joseph (1825–1829)
- Princess Hermine of Waldeck and Pyrmont (1827–1910), married Prince Adolf I George of Schaumburg-Lippe
- George Victor (1831–1893), married Princess Helena of Nassau and secondly Princess Louise of Schleswig-Holstein-Sonderburg-Glücksburg; father of Emma of Waldeck and Pyrmont and grandfather of Queen Wilhelmina of the Netherlands
- Walrad (1833–1867)

== Ancestry ==
Ancestors of Princess Emma of Anhalt-Bernburg-Schaumburg-Hoym

16. Lebrecht, Prince of Anhalt-Zeitz-Hoym
8. Victor I, Prince of Anhalt-Bernburg-Schaumburg-Hoym
17. Charlotte of Nassau-Dillenburg
4. Charles Louis, Prince of Anhalt-Bernburg-Schaumburg-Hoym
18. William Maurice, Count of Isenburg-Büdingen-Birstein
9. Charlotte Louise of Isenburg-Büdingen-Birstein
19. Anna Amalia of Isenburg-Büdingen
2. Victor II, Prince of Anhalt-Bernburg-Schaumburg-Hoym
20. William Maurice, Count of Solms-Braunfels
10. Frederick William I, Prince of Solms-Braunfels
21. Magdalene Sophie of Hesse-Homburg
5. Amalie Eleonore of Solms-Braunfels
22. Carl Otto, Count of Solms-Laubach
11. Sophie of Solms-Laubach
23. Louise Albertine of Schönburg-Waldenburg
1. Emma of Anhalt-Bernburg-Schaumburg-Hoym
24. John Ernst, Count of Nassau-Weilburg
12. Charles August, Prince of Nassau-Weilburg
25. Maria Polyxena of Leiningen-Dagsburg-Hartenburg
6. Charles Christian, Prince of Nassau-Weilburg
26. George August, Count of Nassau-Idstein
13. Auguste Friederike of Nassau-Saarbrücken-Idstein
27. Henriette Dorothea of Oettingen-Oettingen
3. Amelia of Nassau-Weilburg
28. John William Friso, Prince of Orange
14. William IV, Prince of Orange
29. Landgravine Marie Louise of Hesse-Kassel
7. Princess Carolina of Orange-Nassau
30. George II of Great Britain
15. Anne, Princess Royal
31. Caroline of Brandenburg-Ansbach

== Footnotes ==
Princess Emma of Anhalt-Bernburg-Schaumburg-Hoym House of Ascania Born: 20 May 1802 Died: 1 August 1858
German royalty
Vacant Title last held by Princess Augusta of Schwarzburg-Sondershausen	Princess of Waldeck and Pyrmont; 26 June 1823 – 15 May 1845	Vacant Title next held by Princess Helena of Nassau
