= George II of Waldeck and Pyrmont =

George II
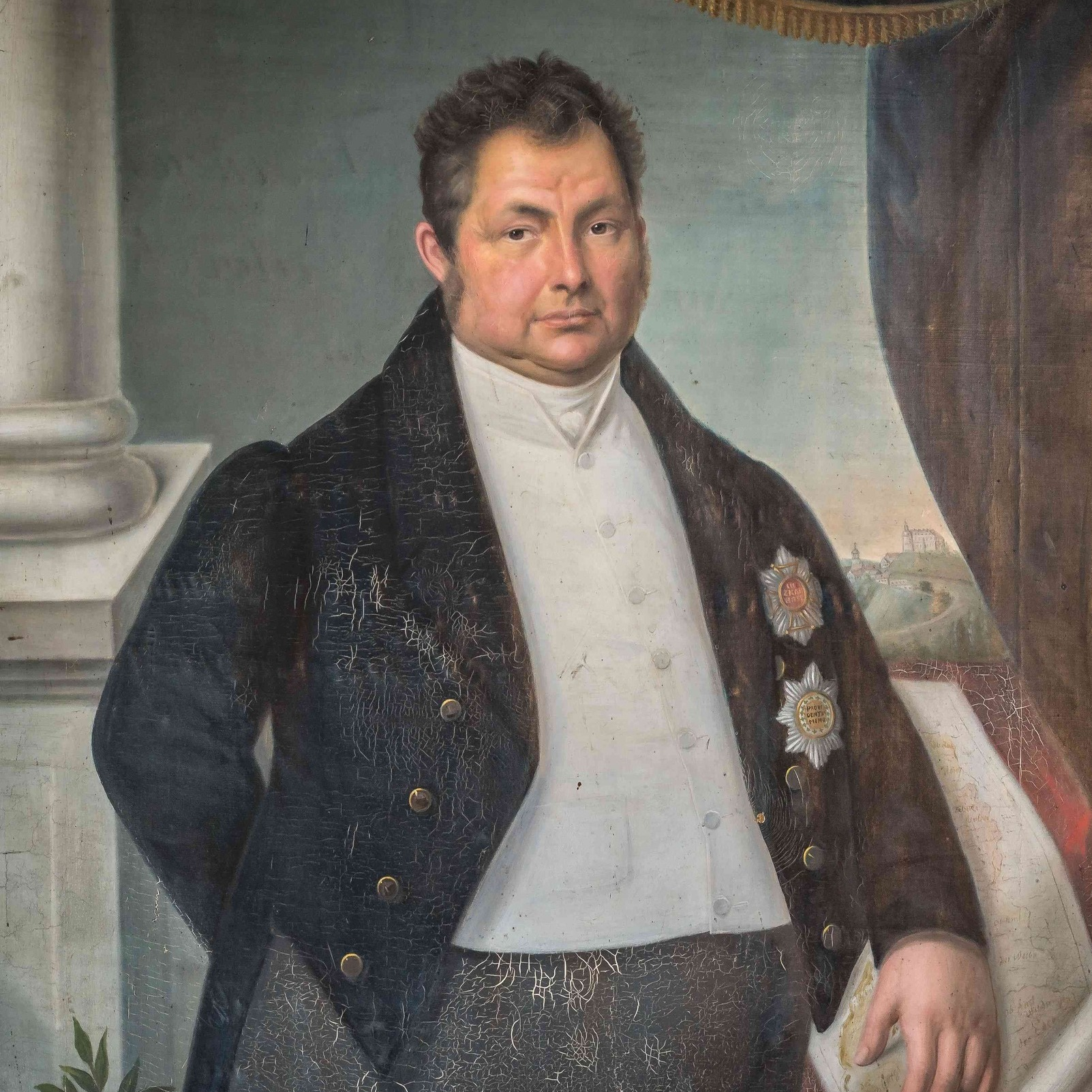
- 1836 portrait

Prince of Waldeck and Pyrmont
- Reign: 9 September 1813 – 15 May 1845
- Predecessor: George I
- Successor: George Victor
- Born: 20 September 1789; Weil am Rhein, Baden
- Died: 15 May 1845 (aged 55); Arolsen, Waldeck and Pyrmont
- Spouse: Princess Emma of Anhalt-Bernburg-Schaumburg-Hoym (m. 1823)
- Issue: Augusta, Princess of Stolberg-Stolberg; Prince Josef; Hermine, Princess of Schaumburg-Lippe; George Victor, Prince of Waldeck and Pyrmont; Prince Wolrad
- House: House of Waldeck and Pyrmont
- Father: George I, Prince of Waldeck and Pyrmont
- Mother: Princess Augusta of Schwarzburg-Sondershausen

George II, Prince of Waldeck and Pyrmont (German: Georg Friedrich Heinrich Fürst zu Waldeck und Pyrmont; 20 September 1789 – 15 May 1845) was Prince of Waldeck and Pyrmont, ruling from 1813 to 1845.

== Early life and ancestry ==
Born into the main Pyrmont line of an ancient German House of Waldeck, he was the third child and eldest surviving son of George I, Prince of Waldeck and Pyrmont and Princess Augusta of Schwarzburg-Sondershausen.

His mother was third child and second daughter of August II, Prince of Schwarzburg-Sondershausen and Princess Christine of Anhalt-Bernburg.

== Marriage and children ==
He was married in Schaumburg on 26 June 1823, to his distant cousin, Princess Emma of Anhalt-Bernburg-Schaumburg-Hoym, member of the House of Anhalt-Bernburg-Schaumburg-Hoym, collateral younger branch of the House of Ascania. She was the third daughter of Victor II, Prince of Anhalt-Bernburg-Schaumburg-Hoym, and Princess Amalie of Nassau-Weilburg.

They had five children:

- Princess Augusta of Waldeck and Pyrmont (21 July 1824 – 4 September 1893), married Alfred, Prince of Stolberg-Stolberg (1820–1903), had issue.
- Prince Josef of Waldeck and Pyrmont (24 November 1825 – 27 December 1829)
- Princess Hermine of Waldeck and Pyrmont (29 September 1827 – 16 February 1910), married Adolf I, Prince of Schaumburg-Lippe, had issue.
- George Victor, Prince of Waldeck and Pyrmont (14 January 1831 – 12 May 1893), married (1) Princess Helena of Nassau, had issue, (2) married Princess Louise of Schleswig-Holstein-Sonderburg-Glücksburg, had issue.
- Prince Wolrad of Waldeck and Pyrmont (24 January 1833 – 20 January 1867)

== Death ==
Prince George II of Waldeck and Pyrmont died in Arolsen on 15 May 1845, at the age of 55. His body was buried in a family mausoleum in Rhoden, Germany.

His wife, Princess Emma of Waldeck and Pyrmont, survived him by 13 years and was buried alongside her husband in 1858.

== Ancestry ==
Ancestors of George II of Waldeck and Pyrmont

16. Christian Ludwig, Count of Waldeck
8. Friedrich Anton Ulrich, Prince of Waldeck and Pyrmont
17. Countess Anna Elisabeth of Rappoltstein
4. Karl August, Prince of Waldeck and Pyrmont
18. Christian II, Count Palatine of Zweibrücken-Birkenfeld
9. Countess Palatine Louise of Zweibrücken-Birkenfeld
19. Countess Catharine Agathe of Rappoltstein
2. George I, Prince of Waldeck and Pyrmont
20. Christian II, Count Palatine of Zweibrücken-Birkenfeld (= 18)
10. Christian III, Count Palatine of Zweibrücken
21. Countess Catharine Agathe of Rappoltstein (= 19)
5. Countess Palatine Christiane Henriette of Zweibrücken-Birkenfeld
22. Louis Crato, Count of Nassau-Saarbrücken
11. Countess Caroline of Nassau-Saarbrücken
23. Countess Philippine Henriette of Hohenlohe-Langenburg
1. George II, Prince of Waldeck and Pyrmont
24. Christian William I, Prince of Schwarzburg-Sondershausen
12. August I, Prince of Schwarzburg-Sondershausen
25. Duchess Wilhelmine Christiane of Saxe-Weimar-Eisenach
6. August II, Prince of Schwarzburg-Sondershausen
26. Karl Frederick, Prince of Anhalt-Bernburg
13. Princess Charlotte Sophie of Anhalt-Bernburg
27. Countess Sophie Albertine of Solms-Sonnenwalde
3. Princess Augusta of Schwarzburg-Sondershausen
28. Karl Frederick, Prince of Anhalt-Bernburg (= 26)
14. Victor Frederick, Prince of Anhalt-Bernburg
29. Countess Sophie Albertine of Solms-Sonnenwalde (= 27)
7. Princess Christine of Anhalt-Bernburg
30. Margrave Albert Frederick of Brandenburg-Schwedt
15. Margravine Albertine of Brandenburg-Schwedt
31. Princess Marie Dorothea of Courland

== Notes and sources ==
- Georg Heinrich zu Waldeck und Pyrmont (German)
- Karl Theodor Menke: Pyrmont und seine Umgebung. Hameln, Pyrmont, 1840, S.65
- L. Curtze: Geschichte und Beschreibung des Fürstentums Waldeck. Arolsen, 1850, S.619f.

George II of Waldeck and Pyrmont House of Waldeck and Pyrmont Cadet branch of the House of Waldeck Born: 20 September 1789 Died: 15 May 1845
Regnal titles
Preceded by George I	Prince of Waldeck and Pyrmont; 9 September 1813 – 15 May 1845	Succeeded by George Victor
