= Princess Vilhelmine Marie of Denmark =

Wilhelmine Marie
- Princess Frederick of Denmark
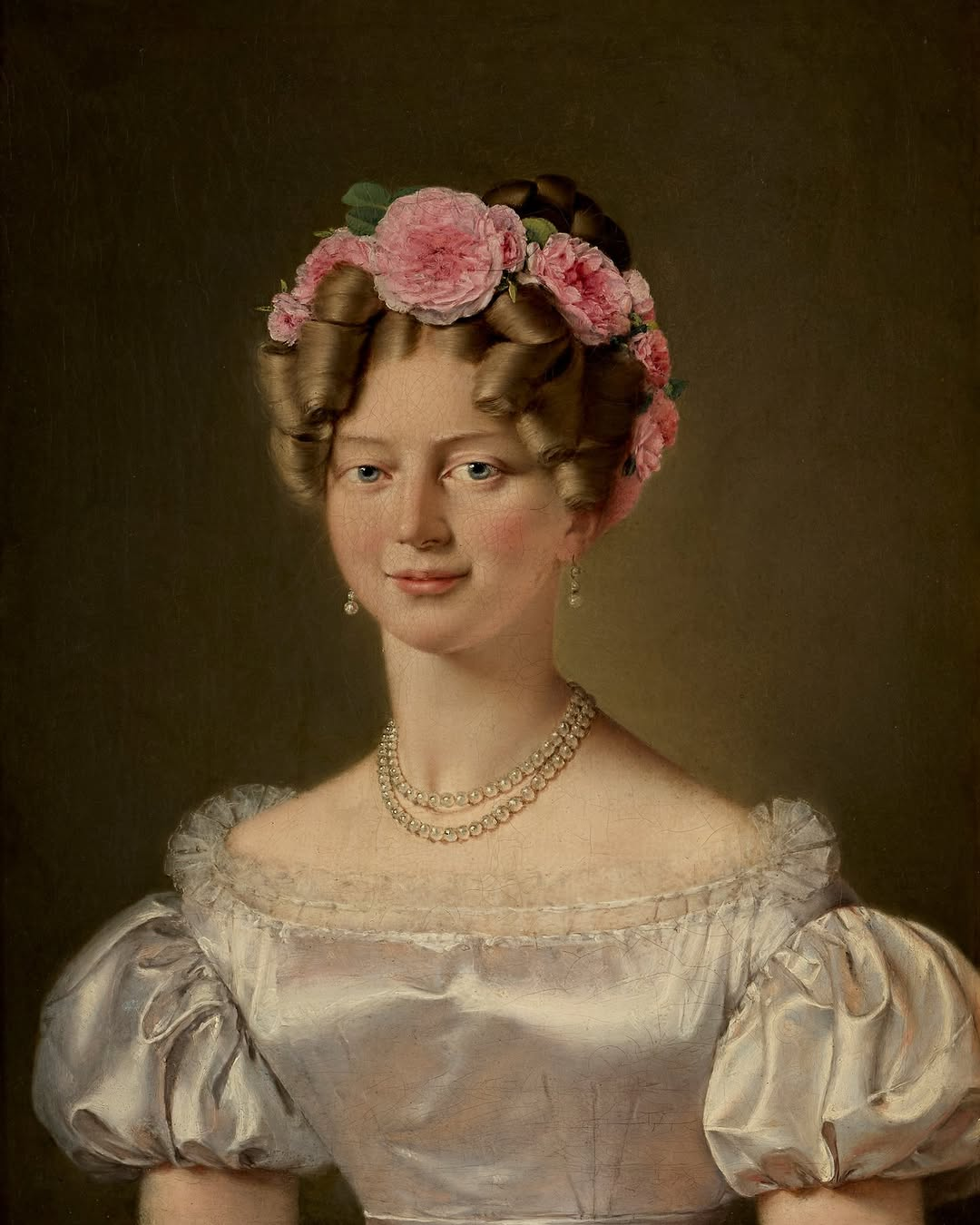
- Portrait by Christian Albrecht Jensen, 1825

Duchess consort of Schleswig-Holstein-Sonderburg-Glücksburg
- Tenure: 19 May 1838 – 24 October 1878
- Born: 18 January 1808; Kiel, Duchy of Holstein
- Died: 30 May 1891 (aged 83); Glücksburg, Schleswig-Holstein, Prussia, Germany
- Spouse: Prince Frederick of Denmark (later Frederick VII) (m. 1828; div. 1837) Karl, Duke of Schleswig-Holstein-Sonderburg-Glücksburg (m. 1838; died 1878)
- House: Oldenburg
- Father: Frederick VI of Denmark
- Mother: Marie Sophie of Hesse-Kassel

Princess Vilhelmine Marie of Denmark and Norway (Danish: Vilhelmine af Danmark; German: Wilhelmine von Dänemark) (18 January 1808 – 30 May 1891) was a Princess of Denmark by birth as the daughter of King Frederick VI.

In 1828, she married her agnatic second cousin, the future King Frederick VII. The marriage was arranged for dynastic reasons with the aim of uniting the two branches of the Danish royal family, but ended in divorce in 1837. The following year, she married another cousin, Karl, Duke of Schleswig-Holstein-Sonderburg-Glücksburg, who was the eldest brother of the future King Christian IX. Both her marriages were childless.

== Early life ==
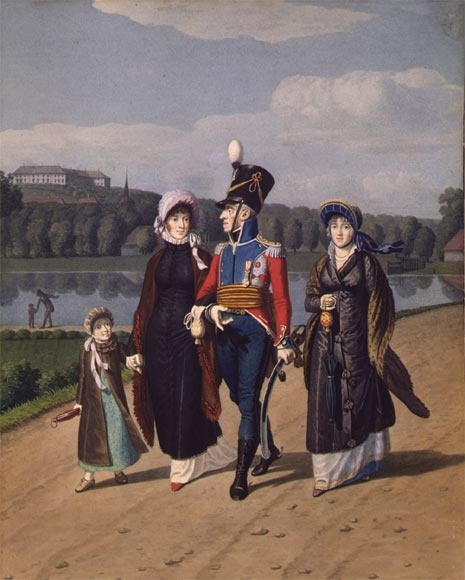
King Frederick VI, Queen Marie, and their daughters strolling in the gardens of Frederiksberg Palace in the 1810s.

Princess Vilhelmine Marie was born on 18 January 1808 as the sixth daughter and youngest child of Crown Prince Frederick and Princess Marie Sophie of Hesse-Kassel. Her father, Frederick, was the only son of King Christian VII, and had assumed the role as regent at the age of 16 in 1784 because his father, King Christian VII, had major psychological problems and was mentally incapable of functioning as king. She was born at Kiel Castle in the Danish-ruled Duchy of Holstein, where her parents had lived since 1805, in order to be close to the border because of the threatening proximity of Napoleon Bonaparte in Germany during the Napoleonic Wars. Her parents became king and queen in 1808.

Frederick and Marie had eight children, of which only two survived infancy: Vilhelmine Marie and her elder sister, Princess Caroline. Within two months of Vilhelmine Marie's birth, her grandfather died of a cerebral aneurysm and her father became king.

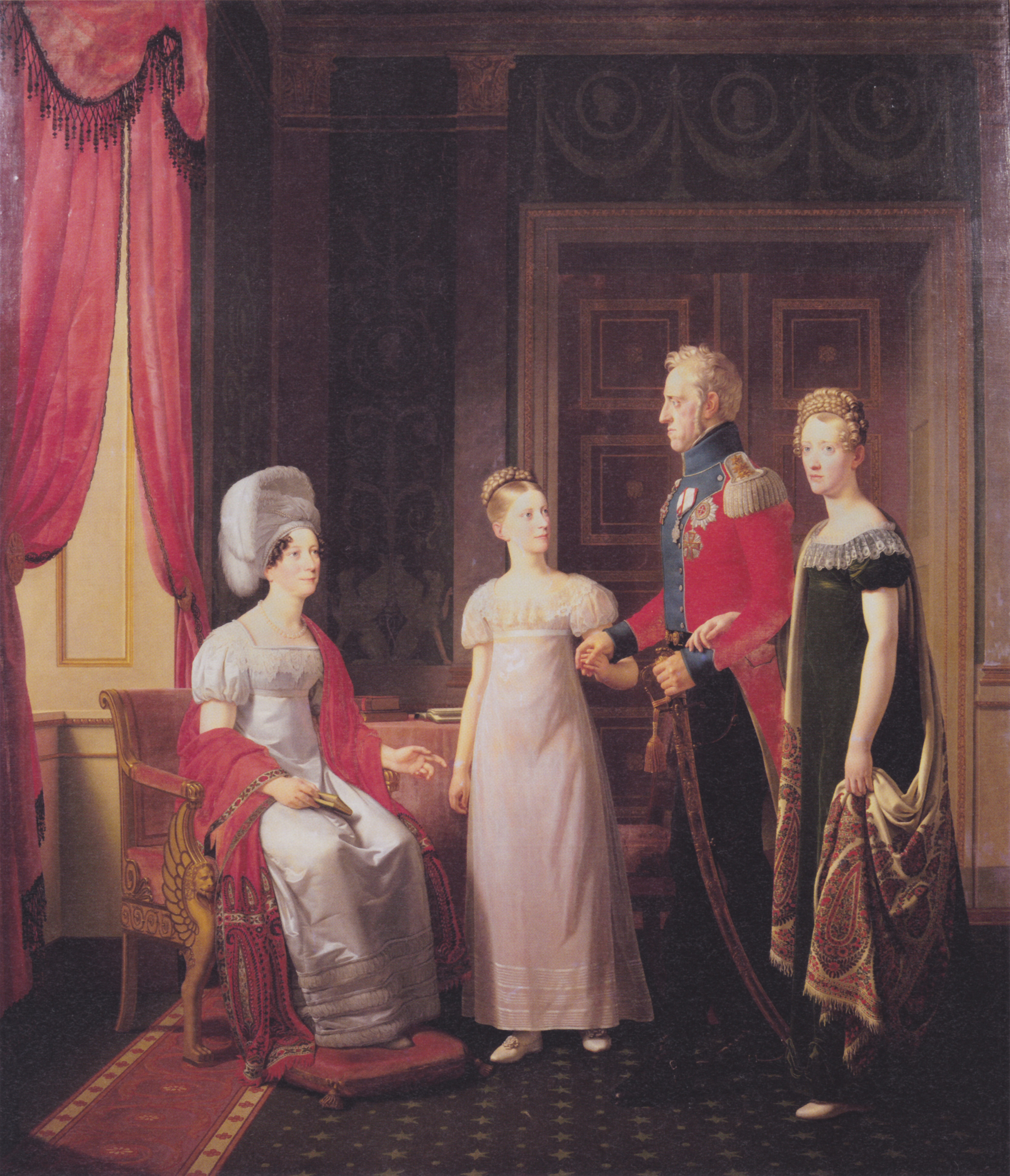
King Frederick VI and Queen Marie with their daughters Princess Caroline and Princess Vilhelmine Marie in a portrait by Eckersberg, 1821

Princess Vilhelmine Marie was confirmed on 16 May 1824 in the chapel of Frederiksberg Palace outside Copenhagen.

== First marriage ==
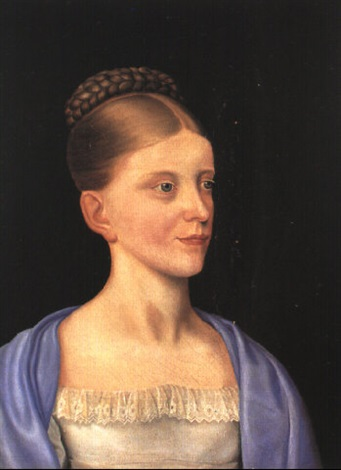
Portrait of a young Princess Vilhelmine Marie by Christoffer Wilhelm Eckersberg, 1826

Since her father had no surviving legitimate sons, Vilhelmine Marie was a very desirable bride. Among her suitors was the future Oscar I of Sweden of the newly established Bernadotte dynasty. On 28 May 1826, she was engaged to her second cousin, Prince Frederick of Denmark, the future King Frederick VII, who was a direct male-line descendant of King Frederick V through his second wife, Queen Juliana Maria of Brunswick-Wolfenbüttel. The engagement was very popular as it united the two lines of the Royal House, which had been in a strained relationship since 1814.

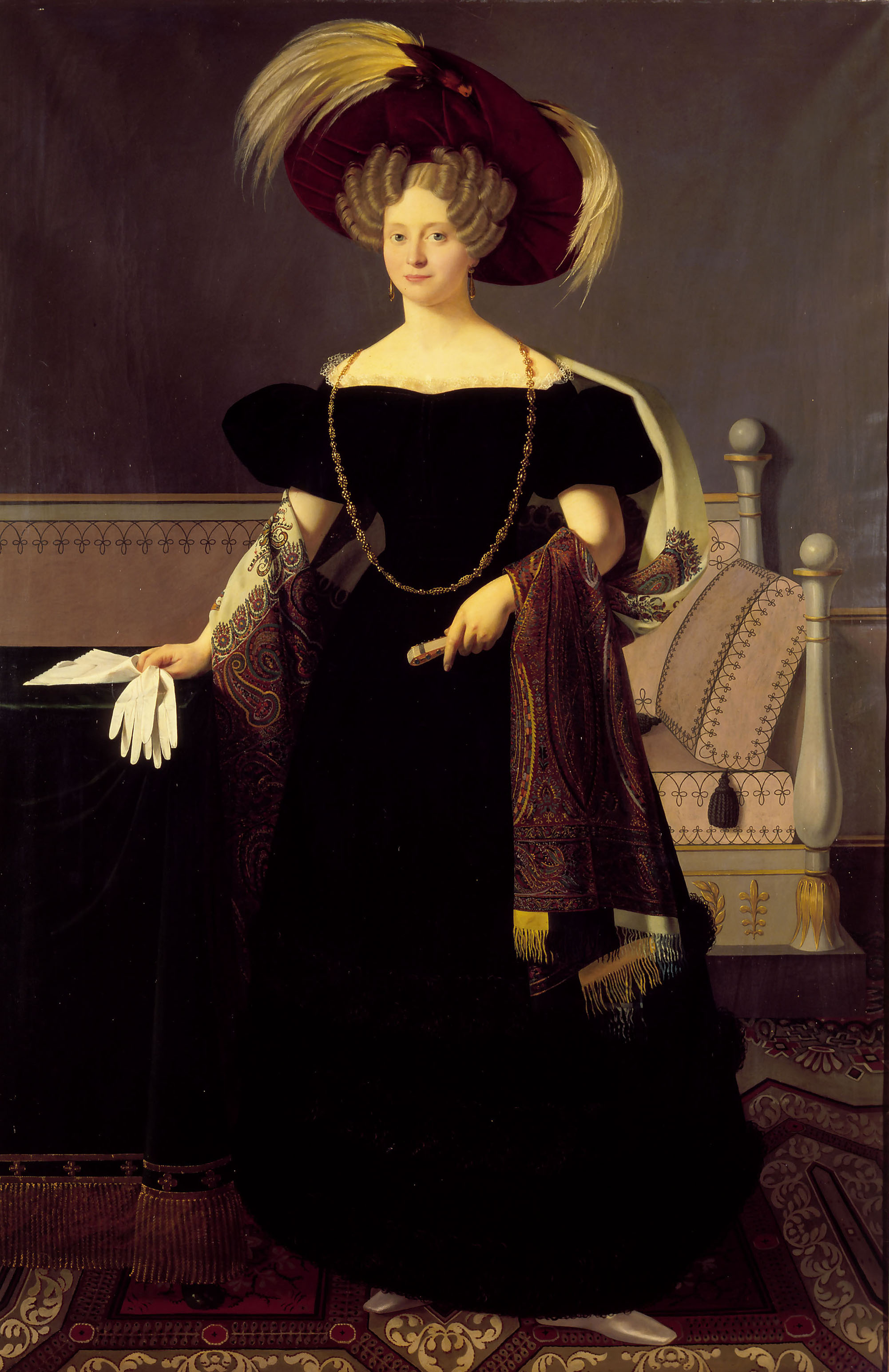
Portrait of Princess Vilhelmine Marie by Louis Aumont, 1831

The couple were married on 1 November 1828 by the royal confessor Jacob Peter Mynster at the chapel of Christiansborg Palace in Copenhagen. The public celebrations were unusually vivid, with illuminations, poems, public festivities, and a foundation, Vilhelmine-Stiftelsen, for the benefit of providing brides with suitable equipment. The Danish play Elves' Hill (Danish: Elverhøj) was commissioned by the King for the wedding and premiered on 6 November 1828.

It became evident, however, that the marriage was disastrous and unhappy: Frederick's debauched lifestyle, full of infidelity and heavy drinking, was said to have deeply hurt the 'female feelings' of the princess, who, being good hearted and mild, lacked character and influence over her husband. Her unhappy marriage concerned her parents, who felt sorry for her. The couple separated in 1834 and divorced in 1837.

== Second marriage ==
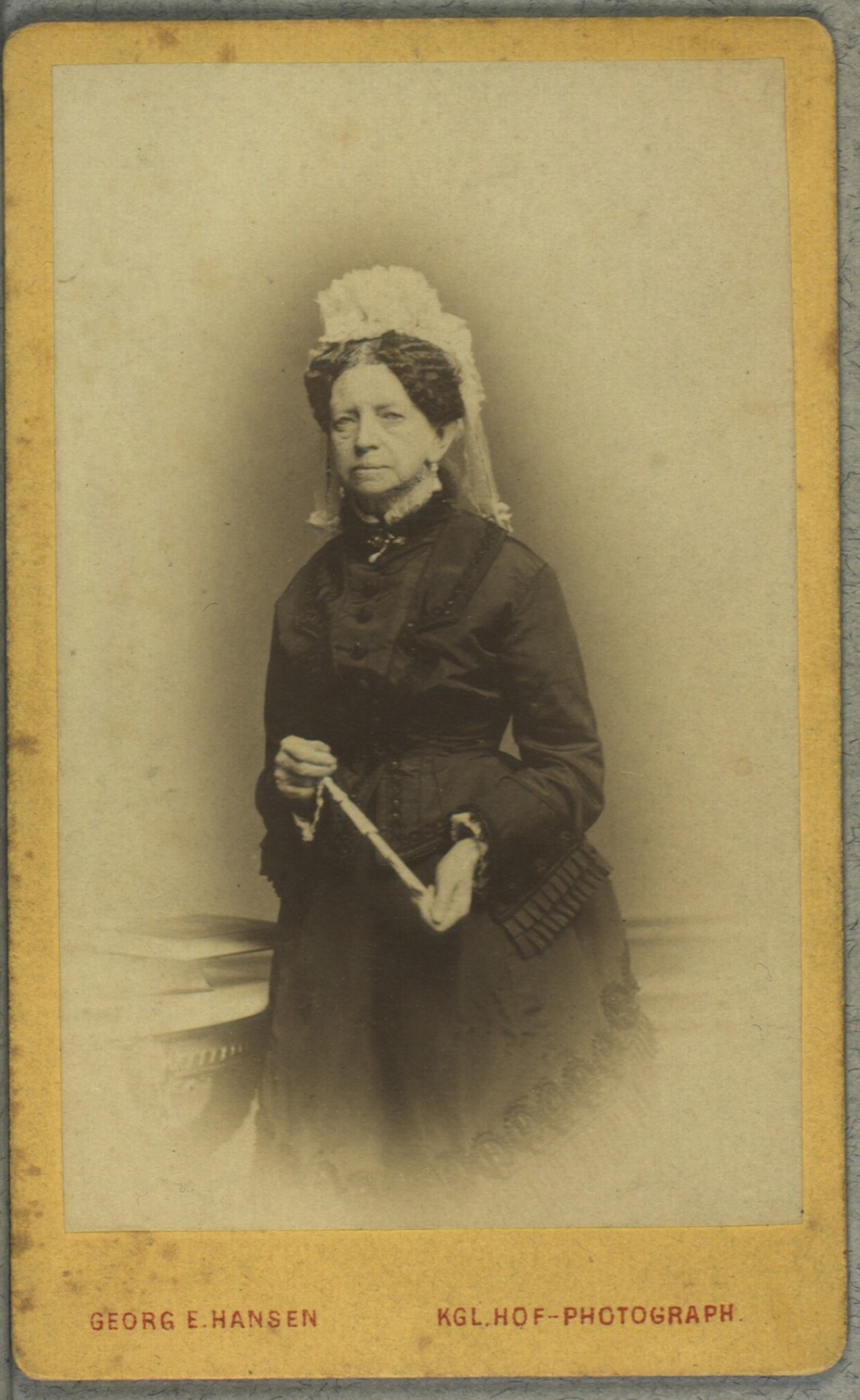
Photograph of Princess Vilhelmine Marie, c. 1870-90

In Amalienborg, on 19 May 1838, Princess Vilhelmine Marie married Karl, Duke of Schleswig-Holstein-Sonderburg-Glücksburg, the eldest brother of the future Christian IX, and took up residence in Kiel. Her second marriage was said to have been very happy, although, just like her previous, was childless. Many believe that she was infertile as there are no records of her having any miscarriages or stillbirths.

During the First Schleswig War, her spouse actively sided against Denmark, which severed Vilhelmine's relations with the Danish royal family for some time, and she resided in Dresden. In 1852, a reconciliation took place and she again enjoyed a close relationship with her family in Copenhagen. The couple returned to Denmark and settled in the Louisenlund Palace. Her status as the daughter of a popular king helped her to quickly regain her popularity among the people; something her consort never achieved. In 1870, she moved to Glücksburg Castle, where she lived for the rest of her life after Karl's death in 1878. Vilhelmine spent her old age isolated; communicating in social life was difficult after the loss of her hearing. She, however, continued to spend a lot of time on charity and became popular in Glücksburg because of this. She was reportedly sorry for Denmark's loss of the duchies in 1864 and happy over the new ruling dynasty in Denmark. At the time of her death, Princess Vilhelmine Marie was the last surviving grandchild of Christian VII.

== Ancestry ==
Ancestors of Princess Vilhelmine Marie of Denmark

8. Frederick V of Denmark
4. Christian VII of Denmark
9. Princess Louise of Great Britain
2. Frederick VI of Denmark
10. Frederick, Prince of Wales
5. Princess Caroline Matilda of Great Britain
11. Princess Augusta of Saxe-Gotha
1. Princess Vilhelmine Marie of Denmark
12. Frederick II, Landgrave of Hesse-Kassel
6. Prince Charles of Hesse-Kassel
13. Princess Mary of Great Britain
3. Princess Marie Sophie of Hesse-Kassel
14. Frederick V of Denmark (= 8)
7. Princess Louise of Denmark
15. Princess Louise of Great Britain (= 9)

Princess Vilhelmine Marie of Denmark House of Oldenburg Born: 18 January 1808 Died: 30 May 1891
German nobility
Preceded by Louise Caroline of Hesse-Kassel	Duchess consort of Schleswig-Holstein-Sonderburg-Glücksburg; 19 May 1838 – 24 October 1878	Succeeded by Adelheid of Schaumburg-Lippe
