= Karl, Duke of Schleswig-Holstein-Sonderburg-Glücksburg =

Karl
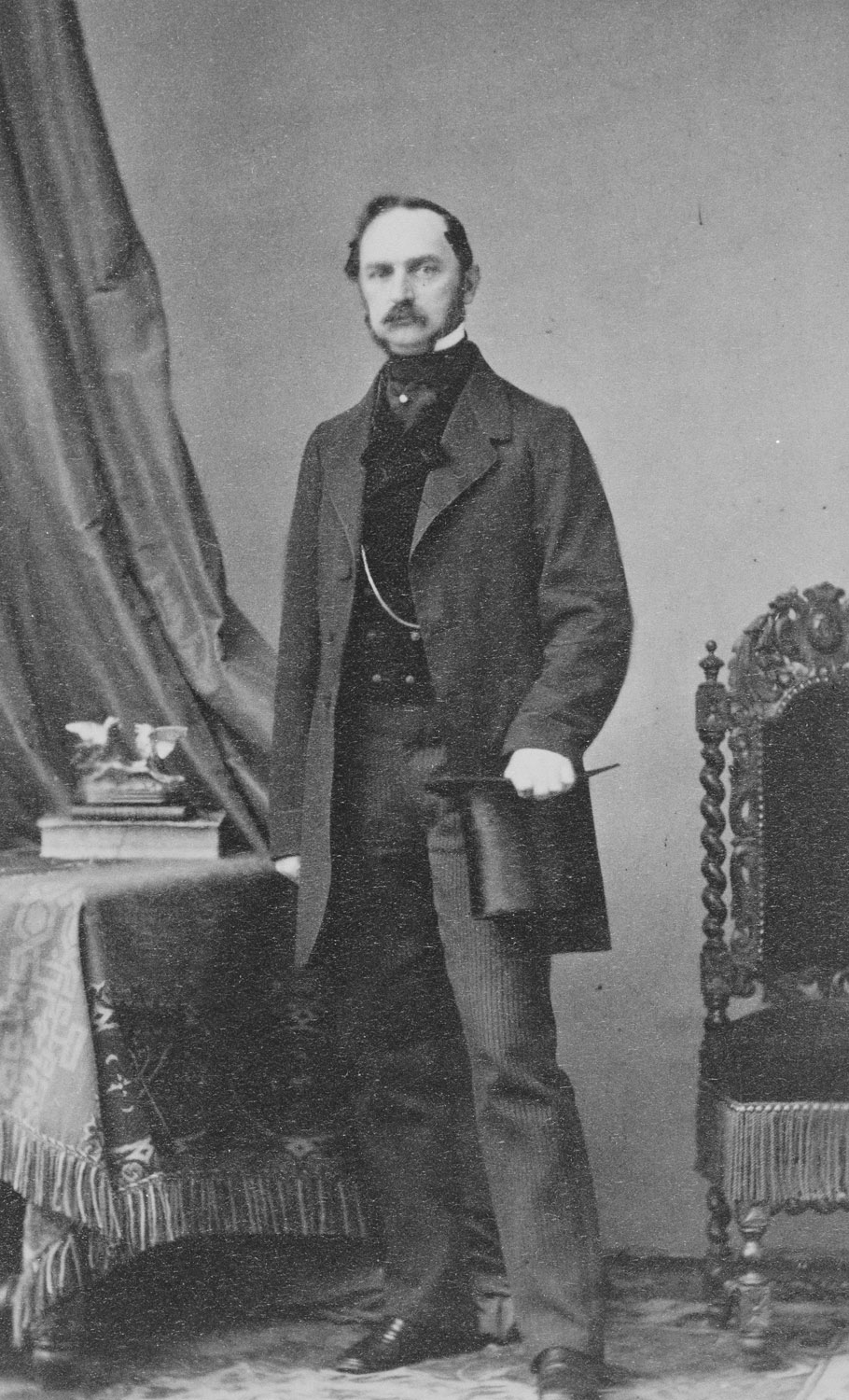
- Karl in 1862

Duke of Schleswig-Holstein-Sonderburg-Glücksburg
- Reign: 27 February 1831 – 14 October 1878
- Predecessor: Friedrich Wilhelm
- Successor: Friedrich
- Born: 30 September 1813; Gottorp, Schleswig
- Died: 24 October 1878 (aged 65); Glücksburg, Schleswig-Holstein, Prussia
- Spouse: Princess Vilhelmine Marie of Denmark (m. 1838)
- House: Glücksburg
- Father: Friedrich Wilhelm, Duke of Schleswig-Holstein-Sonderburg-Glücksburg
- Mother: Princess Louise Caroline of Hesse-Kassel

Karl, Duke of Schleswig-Holstein-Sonderburg-Glücksburg (30 September 1813 – 24 October 1878) was Duke of Schleswig-Holstein-Sonderburg-Glücksburg from 1831 to 1878. Karl was the eldest son of Friedrich Wilhelm, Duke of Schleswig-Holstein-Sonderburg-Glücksburg, and Princess Louise Caroline of Hesse-Kassel and an elder brother of Christian IX of Denmark.

Upon his father's death in 1831, Karl inherited Glücksburg Castle and became Duke of Schleswig-Holstein-Sonderburg-Glücksburg at the age of seventeen. In 1838, he became the son-in-law of King Frederick VI of Denmark when he married his cousin, Princess Vilhelmine Marie of Denmark. A supporter of the Schleswig–Holstein movement, Duke Karl actively sided against Denmark during the First Schleswig War from 1848 to 1851, which caused the duke's relations with the Danish Royal family to be severed. The ducal couple lived abroad until an uneasy reconciliation was established in 1852. In 1854, he had to cede the family seat Glücksburg Castle to King Frederick VII of Denmark. During the Second Schleswig War in 1864, the ducal couple left the country again, only to return again the following year after the Prussian victory. In 1871, after long negotiations with the Prussian Government, the Duke again took possession of Glücksburg Castle. Upon the death of the childless duke, the ducal title was inherited by his younger brother, Friedrich.

== Early life ==
=== Birth and family ===
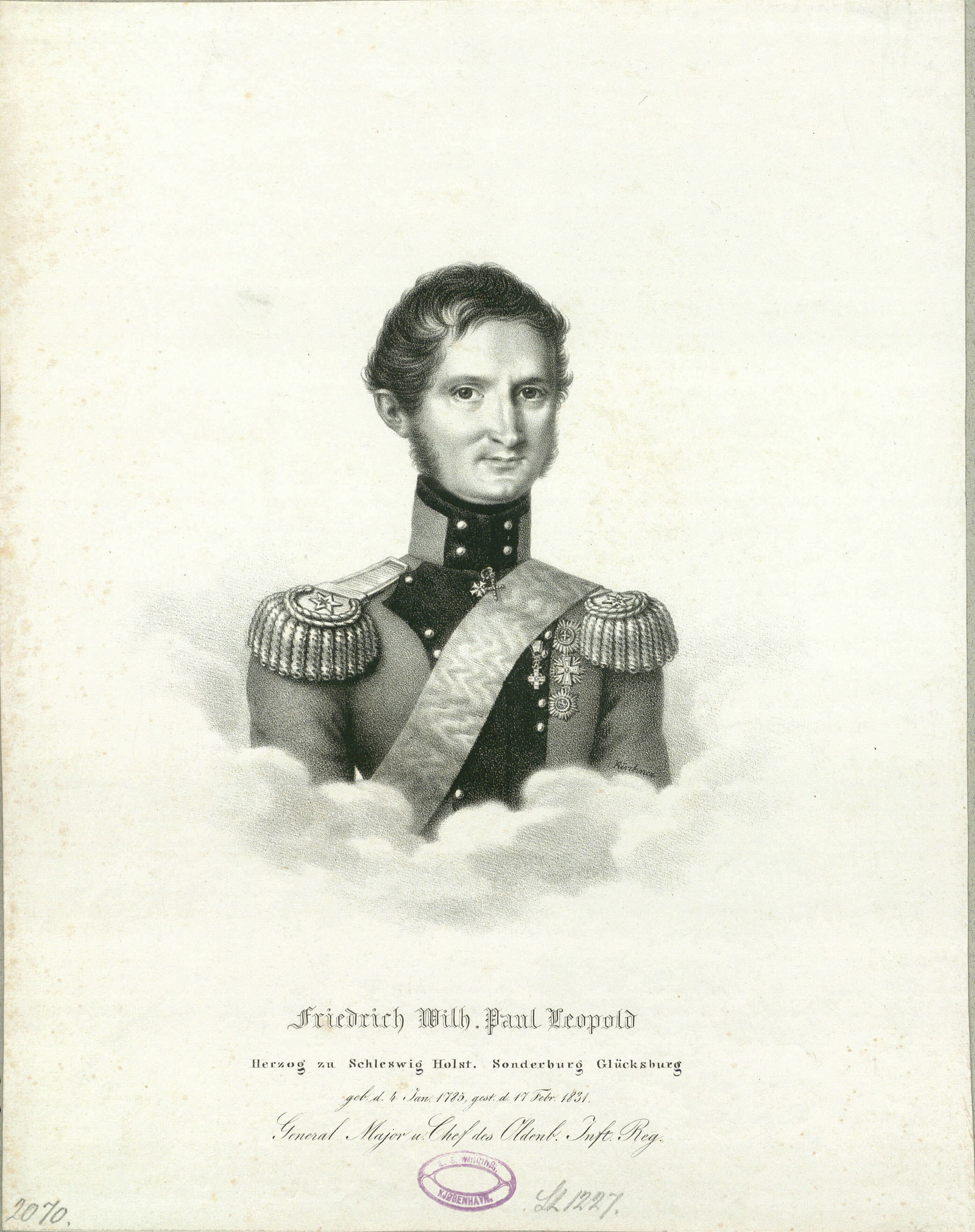
Prince Christian's father Friedrich Wilhelm, Duke of Schleswig-Holstein-Sonderburg-Beck, from 1825 Duke of Glücksburg

Prince Karl was born on 30 September 1813 at the residence of his maternal grandparents, Gottorf Castle, near the town of Schleswig in the Duchy of Schleswig, at the time a fief under the Crown of Denmark. Born as a prince of Schleswig-Holstein-Sonderburg-Beck, he was the third child and eldest son of Friedrich Wilhelm, Duke of Schleswig-Holstein-Sonderburg-Beck, and Princess Louise Caroline of Hesse-Kassel.

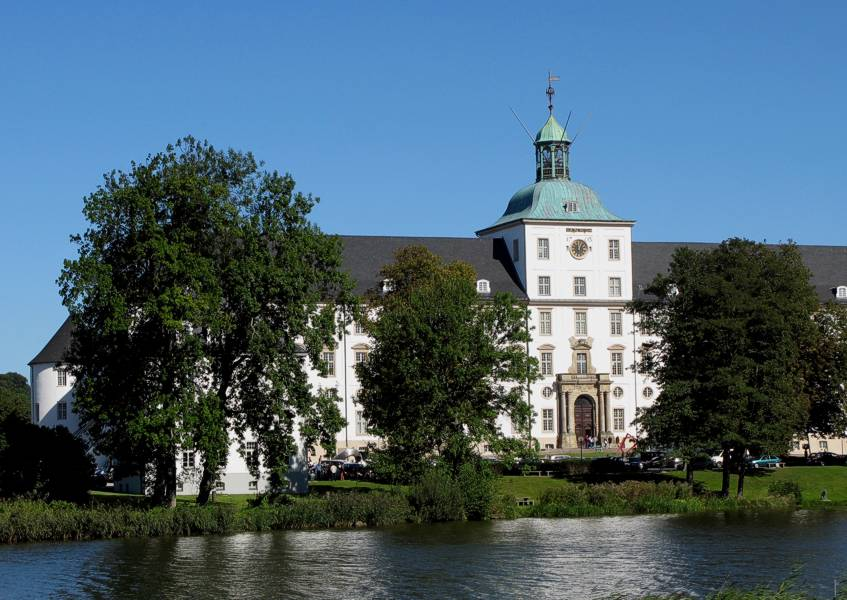
Prince Karl's birthplace Gottorf Castle in Schleswig-Holstein, seat of the royal governors of the duchies of Schleswig and Holstein (2007)

Prince Karl's father was the head of the ducal house of Schleswig-Holstein-Sonderburg-Beck, a junior male branch of the House of Oldenburg which descended from King Christian III of Denmark's younger son, John the Younger, Duke of Schleswig-Holstein-Sonderburg. Prince Karl's mother was a daughter of Prince Charles of Hesse-Kassel, an originally German prince, who had made a career in Denmark, where he was a Danish Field Marshal and Royal Governor of the duchies of Schleswig and Holstein.

=== Childhood ===
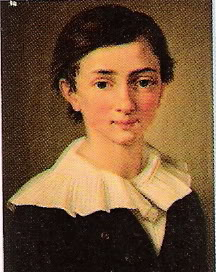
Portrait of Prince Karl by Carl Andreas August Goos, 1829.

Initially, the young prince grew up with his parents and many brothers and sisters at the miniature court of his maternal grandparents at Gottorf Castle, the habitual seat of the royal governors of the duchies of Schleswig and Holstein. However, in 1824, the dowager duchess of Glücksburg, widow of Frederick Henry William, the last duke of the elder line of the house Schleswig-Holstein-Sønderborg-Glücksburg, who had himself died in 1779, died. Glücksburg Castle, located a little south of Flensburg Fjord, not far from city of Flensburg, was now empty, and on 6 June 1825, Duke Friedrich Wilhelm was appointed Duke of Glücksburg by his brother-in-law, King Frederick VI of Denmark. Duke Friedrich Wilhelm subsequently changed his title to Duke of Schleswig-Holstein-Sonderburg-Glücksburg and thus founded the younger Glücksburg line.

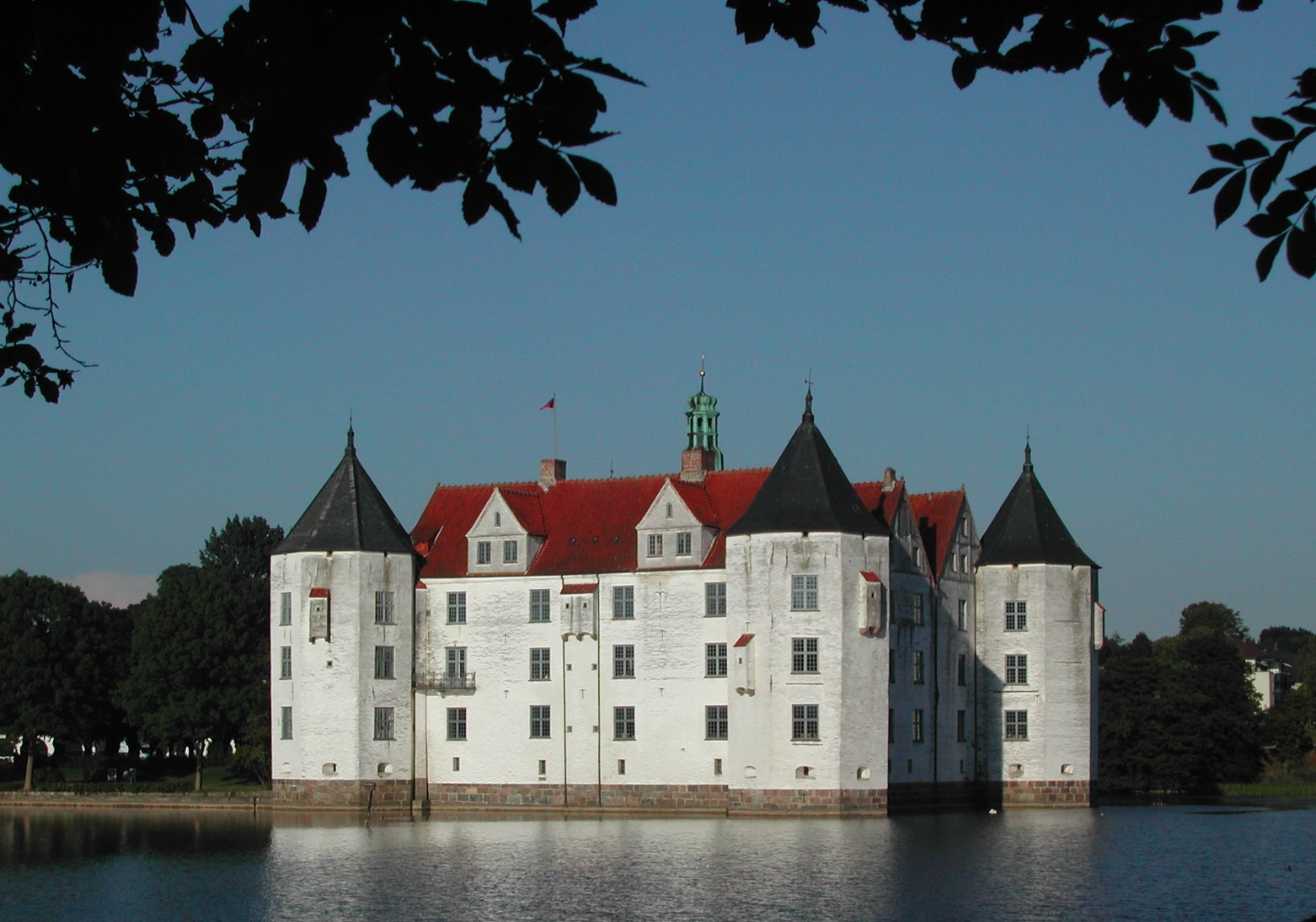
Prince Carl's childhood home, Glücksburg Castle in Schleswig-Holstein, seat of the eponymous ducal branches of the House of Oldenburg (2005).

Subsequently, the family moved to Glücksburg Castle, where Prince Karl was raised with his siblings under their father's supervision. In 1831, King Frederick VI appointed him staff captain in the Oldenburg Infantry Regiment which was stationed in Rendsburg and headed by his father. However, barely three weeks later, on 17 February 1831, Duke Friedrich Wilhelm died at the age of just 46 of a cold that had developed into pneumonia and, at the Duke's own discretion, scarlet fever, which had previously affected two of his children. Upon his father's death, Karl became Duke of Schleswig-Holstein-Sonderburg-Glücksburg and inherited Glücksburg Castle at the age of seventeen. In 1837, Carl was appointed major à la suite in the army, in 1838 he was appointed lieutenant colonel à la suite in the Lauenburg Jäger Corps, in 1839 Commander of the same and later that year he was appointed Colonel.

== Marriage ==
On 19 May 1838, the 24 year old Duke Karl married his first cousin, the five year older Princess Vilhelmine Marie of Denmark, daughter of Frederick VI of Denmark and his wife Marie Sophie of Hesse-Kassel, at Amalienborg Palace in Copenhagen. Vilhelmine Marie was the former wife of Prince Frederick of Denmark (later Frederick VII of Denmark), whom she divorced in 1837. After the wedding, the newly married couple moved into the castle in Kiel which the king gave them as their residence.

== Later life ==
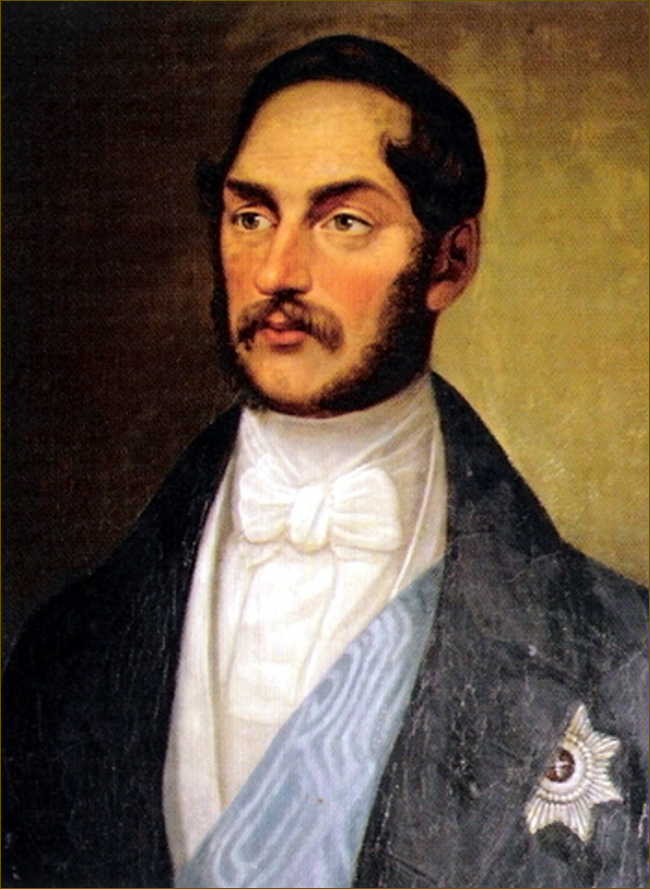
Portrait of Duke Karl by Caroline Bardua

During the Schleswig–Holstein question, Duke Charles was a supporter of the Schleswig–Holstein movement. In 1846, as head of the House of Glücksburg, he protested against King Christian VIII's open letter on the succession in the duchies of Schleswig and Holstein, and out of dissatisfaction resigned from the Army in August of the same year. Nevertheless, eight days after his accession to the throne, King Frederick VII gave him the rank of major general. Duke Karl actively sided against Denmark during the First Schleswig War from 1848 to 1851, which caused the ducal couple's relations with the Danish Royal family to be severed. During the war, he initially took command of one of the provisional Schleswig-Holstein government's Infantry Brigades, but already in the autumn of 1848, he and his wife moved to Dresden in the Kingdom of Saxony. There they resided until 1852, when they returned to Denmark after am uneasy reconciliation was established. As a result of his rebellion against the Danish government, Duke Carl lost his Danish orders and decorations and only had them restored in 1856. Also, in 1854, he had to cede the family seat Glücksburg Castle to King Frederick VII of Denmark who used the castle as his summer residence and also died there in 1863.

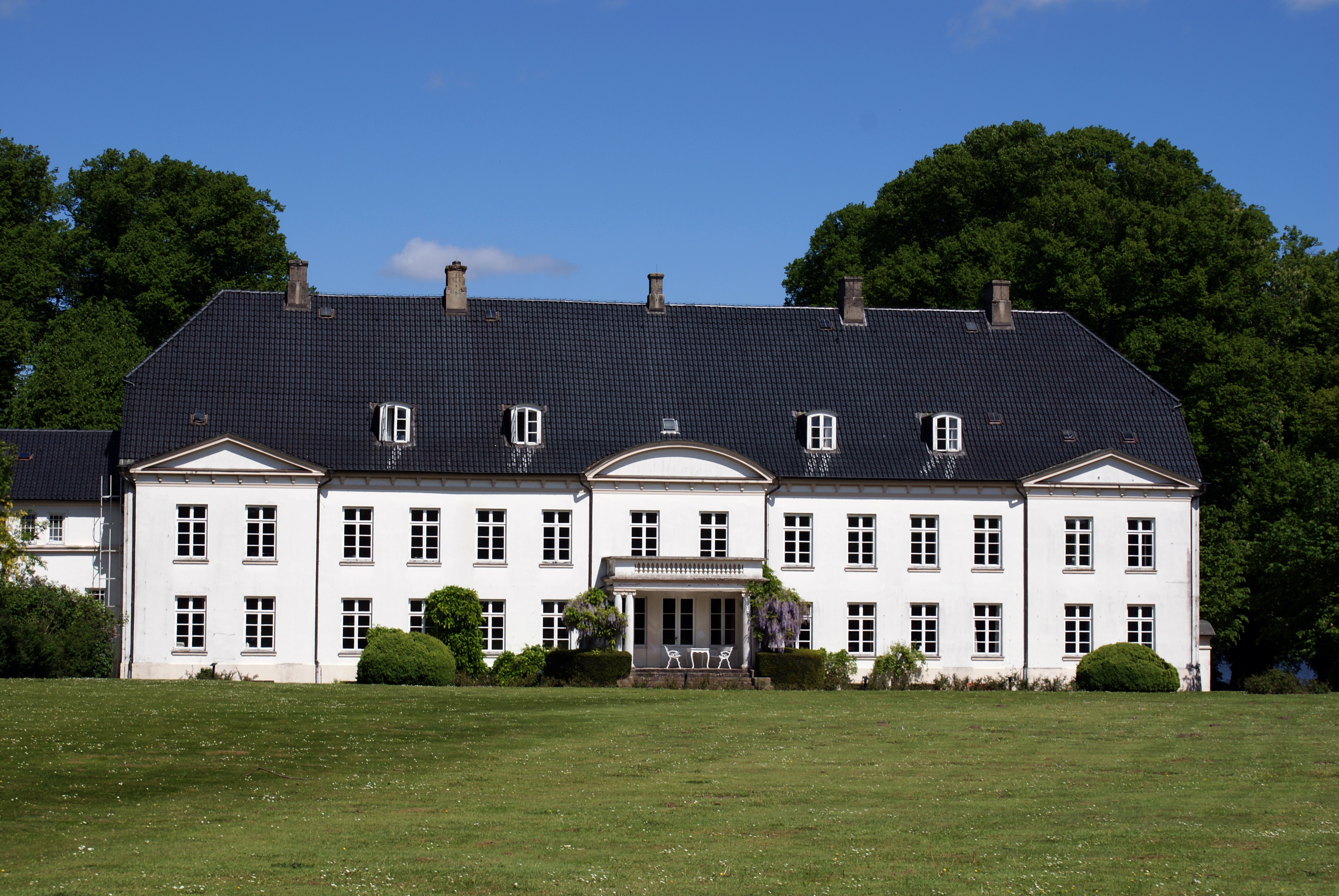
Louisenlund manor in Schleswig-Holstein, longtime summer residence of the ducal couple (2009).

In the following years, they lived at Kiel Castle in the winter, and in the summer at Louisenlund near the town of Schleswig. During the Second Schleswig War of 1864, they left the country again, only to return again the following year after the Prussian victory in the war. In the subsequent years, they lived at Louisenlund, but no more in Kiel. In 1871, however, the Duke and Duchess again took possession of the family seat Glücksburg Castle which after long negotiations in 1870 was returned to the Duke by the Prussian Government, and which they then used as their principal residence.

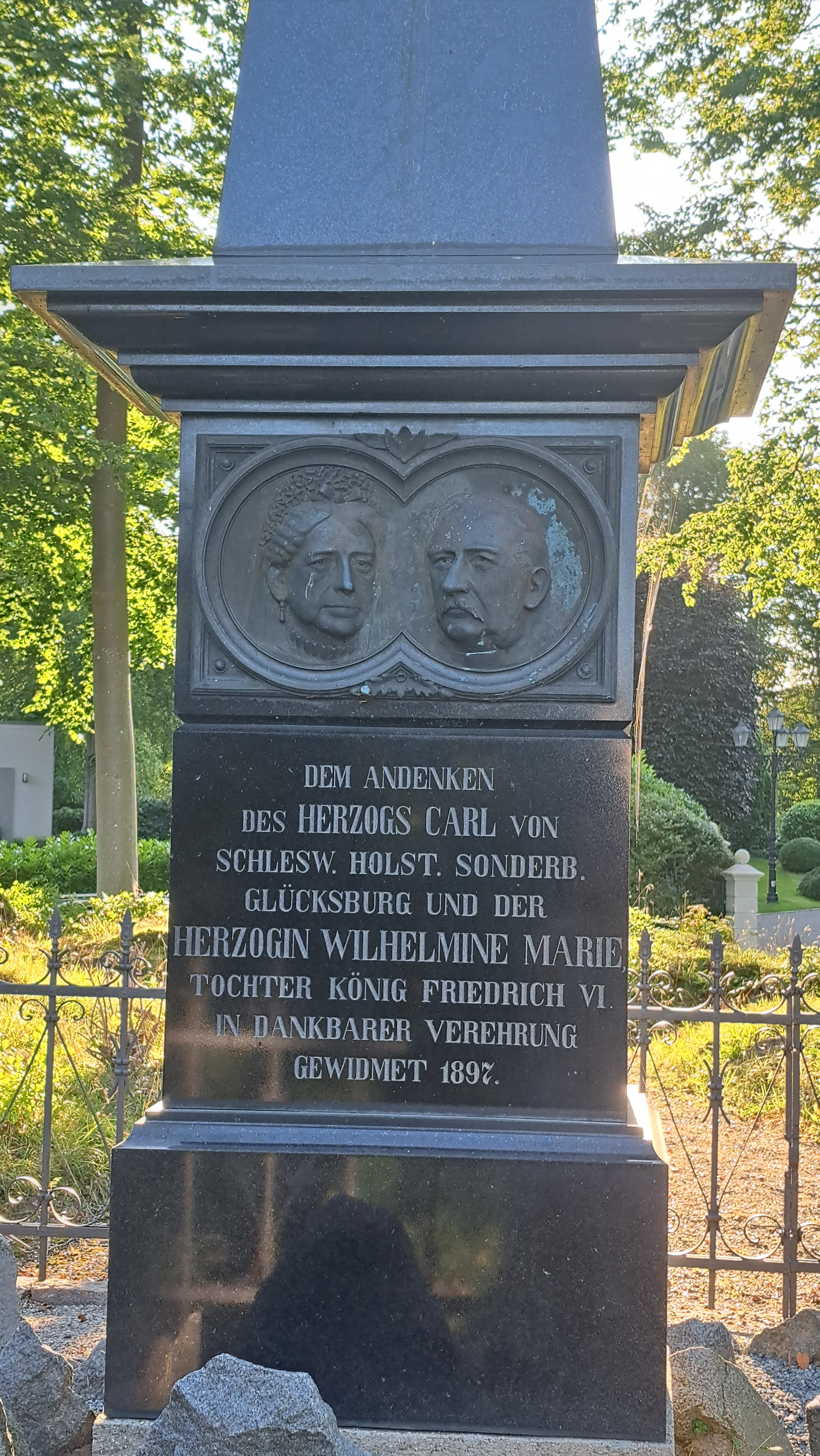
Monument to Duke Karl and Duchess Vilhelmine Marie at Glücksburg Castle.

Duke Karl died at the age of 65 on 24 October 1878 at Glücksburg Castle. His marriage with Vilhelmine Marie was without issue, and many believe that she was barren as there are no records of her having any miscarriages or stillbirths. Upon his death, the ducal title was therefore inherited by Duke Karl's younger brother, Friedrich. Duke Karl was interred at Glucksburg Castle. Duchess Vilhelmine Marie survived her husband by 12 years and died on 30 May 1891 at Glücksburg Castle.

== Ancestry ==
Ancestors of Karl, Duke of Schleswig-Holstein-Sonderburg-Glücksburg

8. Prince Karl Anton August of Schleswig-Holstein-Sonderburg-Beck
4. Frederick Charles Louis, Duke of Schleswig-Holstein-Sonderburg-Beck
9. Countess Charlotte of Dohna-Leistenau
2. Frederick William, Duke of Schleswig-Holstein-Sonderburg-Glücksburg
10. Count Karl Leopold von Schlieben
5. Countess Friederike von Schlieben
11. Countess Marie Eleonore von Lehndorff
1. Karl, Duke of Schleswig-Holstein-Sonderburg-Glücksburg
12. Frederick II, Landgrave of Hesse-Kassel
6. Prince Charles of Hesse-Kassel
13. Princess Mary of Great Britain
3. Princess Louise Caroline of Hesse-Kassel
14. Frederick V of Denmark
7. Princess Louise of Denmark
15. Princess Louisa of Great Britain

Karl, Duke of Schleswig-Holstein-Sonderburg-Glücksburg House of Schleswig-Holstein-Sonderburg-Glücksburg Cadet branch of the House of Oldenburg Born: 30 September 1813 Died: 24 October 1878
Regnal titles
Preceded by Friedrich Wilhelm	Duke of Schleswig-Holstein-Sonderburg-Glücksburg; 27 February 1831 – 14 October 1878	Succeeded by Friedrich
