= Lipowina =

- Village
- Location within Poland
- Coordinates: 54°20′38″N 19°58′54″E
- Country: Poland
- Voivodeship: Warmian-Masurian
- County: Braniewo
- Gmina: Braniewo
- Population: 892

Lipowina [lipɔˈvina] is a village in the administrative district of Gmina Braniewo, within Braniewo County, Warmian-Masurian Voivodeship, in northern Poland, close to the border with the Kaliningrad Oblast of Russia.

== Notable residents ==
- Friedrich Wilhelm, Duke of Schleswig-Holstein-Sonderburg-Glücksburg (1785-1831)
