= Glücksburg Castle =

Renaissance castle in Schleswig-Holstein

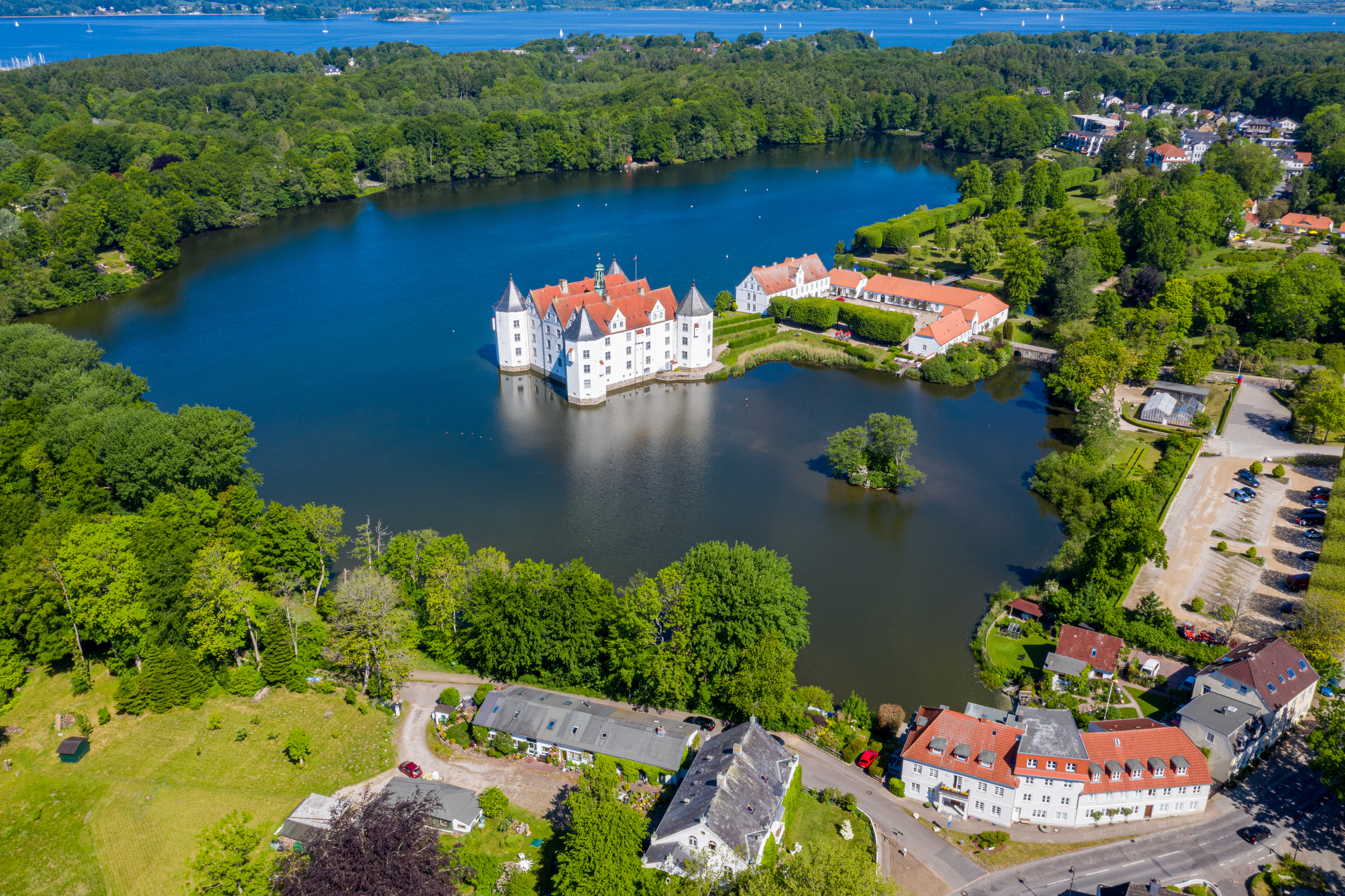
Aerial view

Glücksburg Castle (German: Schloss Glücksburg, Danish: Lyksborg Slot) is one of the most significant Renaissance castles in Northern Europe. The castle was the headquarters of the ducal lines of the house of Glücksburg and temporarily served as the primary residence of the Danish monarch. The building is in the town of Glücksburg, located in Northern Germany on the Flensburg Firth. The structure is a water castle. The ducal house of Glücksburg derived its name from the castle and its family members are related to almost all European dynasties. Nowadays, the castle is one of the most famous sights in the German state of Schleswig-Holstein. Within the castle is a museum which is open to the public.

== History ==
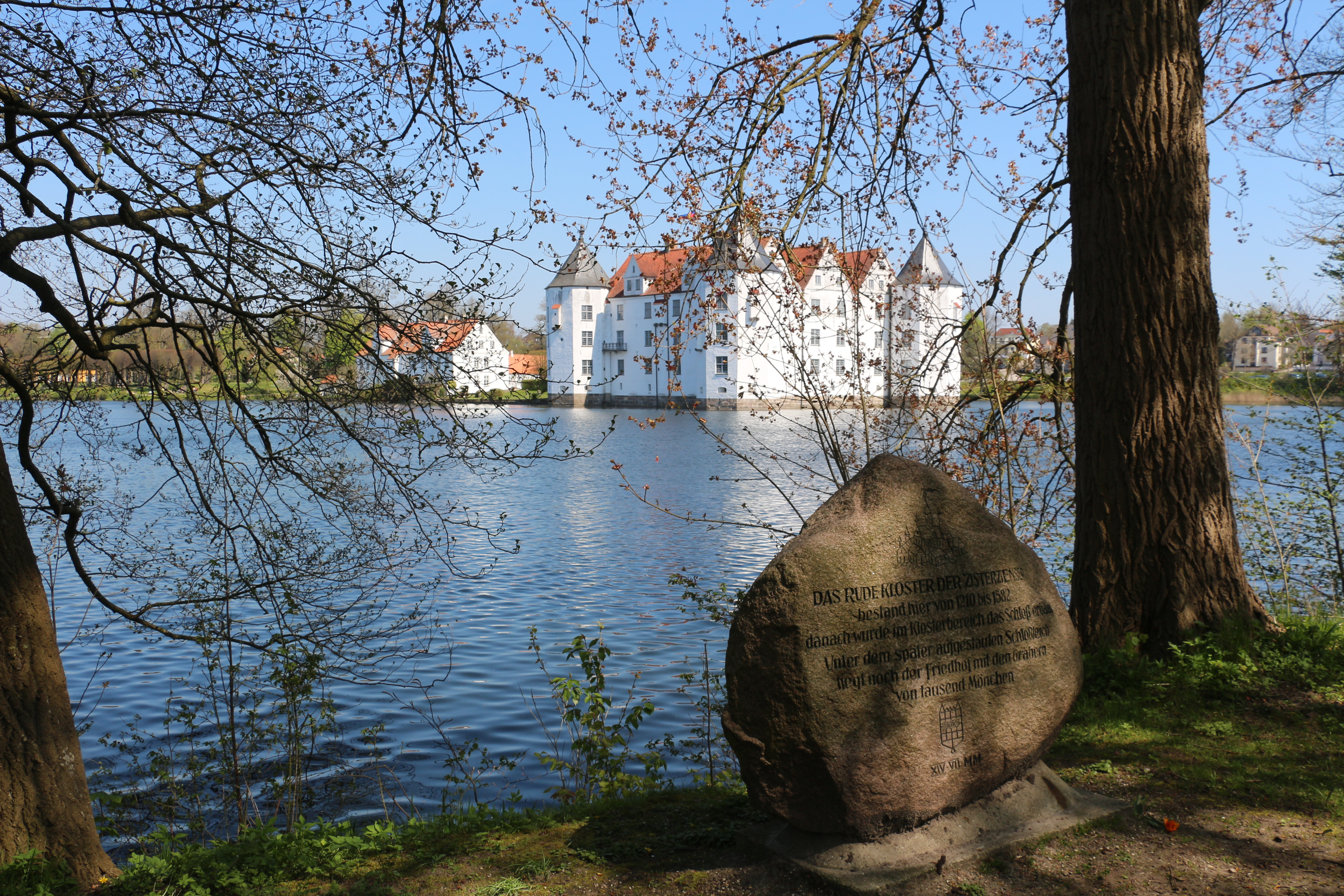
Memorial stone to the monastery at the castle pond of Schloss Glücksburg

=== From the Ryd Abbey to Glücksburg Castle ===
The history of today's castle grounds began in Schleswig in 1192, when the double monastery of St. Michael auf dem Berge was dissolved. The nuns then moved to the St. John's Monastery in Schleswig, which still exists today, while the monks left the place and went to Guldholm on Langsee. Between 1209 and 1210 the monks founded a new Cistercian monastery in Glücksburg. In the vicinity of the monastery was an older motte-and-bailey castle, parts of which have been preserved to this day. The so-called Ryd Abbey and the extensive estates were inhabited and managed by the monks in the following centuries. At the same time, the neighboring town Flensburg still had several castles, as well as the large, militarily important Duburg fortress, built in 1411. In the course of the Reformation, the Rüdekloster was secularized in 1538 and came into the possession of the Danish King Christian III in 1544. The monastery buildings served as the administrator's residence. In the beginning of the 16th century, the condition of the Duburg fortress in Flensburg began to decline.

=== The ancestral seat of the elder line ===
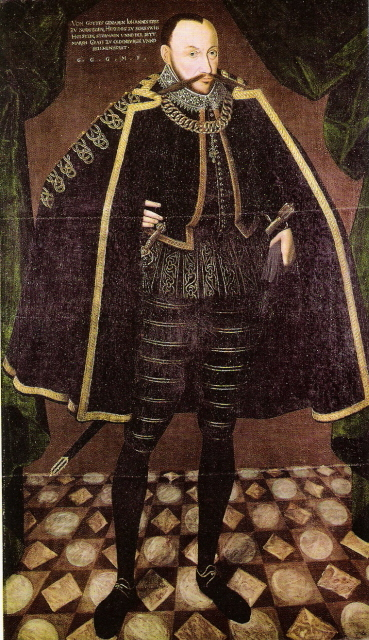
The builder of the castle, Duke Johann of Schleswig-Holstein-Sonderburg. 16th-century painting.

The history of the castle itself begins in 1582. The Danish King Frederick II encumbered his brother John, known as Hans the Younger, with the lands of Sundewitt, the Reinfeld monastery and the old Ryd Abbey, amongst other things. John, who already had considerable possessions, acquired additional areas. The government of the duchy was largely in the hands of John's brother. Although John was a partitioned-off duke, because the estates refused him homage, he tried to increase his fortune and his reputation in other ways. He worked successfully as an early mercantilist entrepreneur. As a typical duke of his time, he expressed his wealth with various buildings and founded, among other things, the castles in Reinfeld and Ahrensbök, which have since been demolished. He modernized the Sønderborg Castle and in 1582 began building Glücksburg castle, where the Ryd Abbey used to be. The castle was built to serve as a comfortable country castle for himself and his family.

After John's death in 1622, the duchy of Schleswig-Holstein-Sonderburg was divided amongst his heirs. John's son Philipp received the castle and the lands of Glücksburg and thus founded the first, the elder line of the House of Schleswig-Holstein-Sonderburg-Glücksburg. The castle remained the seat of the Dukes of Glücksburg for over 150 years, but the small titular duchy itself remained relatively insignificant. Apart from the fact that the members of the house repeatedly married into other noble families, they played no role in the history of the country. During this time, the Glücksburg castle was more of a continuously inhabited noble family seat and less of a courtly residence. In the middle of the 17th century, the palace and its outbuildings housed a court of an average of 80 people.

=== The ancestral seat of the younger line ===
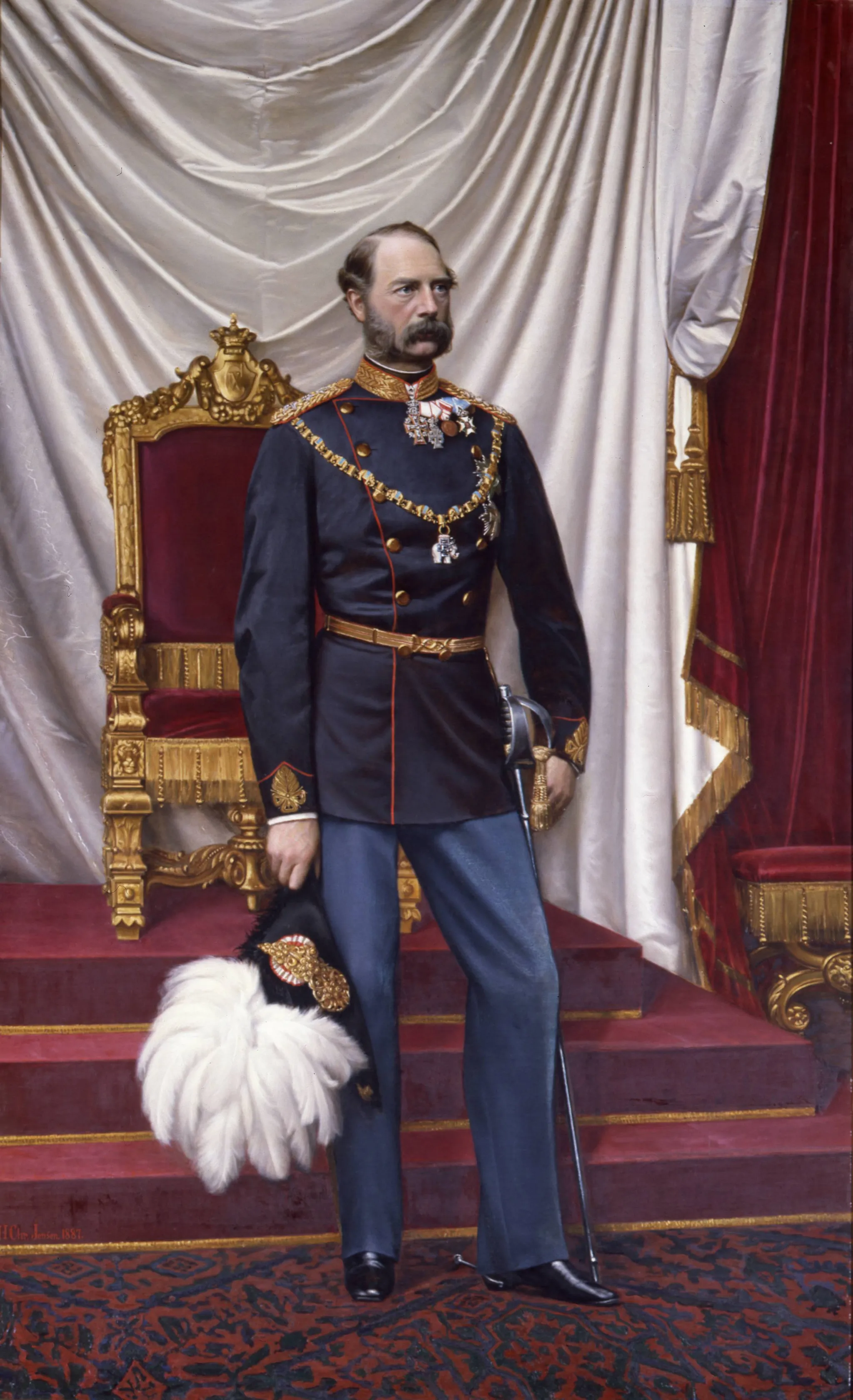
Under Christian IX, Glücksburg became the "cradle of Europe".

in 1825, The Danish King Frederik VI handed over the fief and thus the castle and title to his brother-in-law Friedrich Wilhelm from the Holstein-Beck family. Friedrich Wilhelm assisted the Danish king during the Congress of Vienna and was accordingly rewarded with the Ducal title. Raised in Denmark and Prussia, the new duke was a direct descendant of the palace's builder, John III. Together with his wife, Louise Caroline, a daughter of the ducal governor Prince Charles of Hessen-Kassel, he founded the younger line of the House of Glücksburg. Friedrich Wilhelm no longer lived in the castle himself; however, his wife resided here until the first Schleswig War. Among their ten children was the later Danish king Christian IX – the progenitor of today's Glücksburg line on the Danish throne.

The Danish royal family often used their relatives' castle as a summer residence. From 1854, King Frederik VII occasionally resided at Glücksburg, until he died childless here in 1863. According to the London Protocol of 1852, Christian IX. of the Glücksburg line became his successor. Under him, the castle gained a reputation as the cradle of Europe, and the new king was often referred to as Europe's father-in-law. From Christian's marriage to Princess Louise of Hesse-Kassel, three daughters were married into the imperial and royal houses of Hanover (and Brunswick), Russia and the United Kingdom: The youngest daughter Thyra with Ernst August, Crown Prince of Hanover, the middle Dagmar with Emperor Alexander III and elder Alexandra with King Edward VII. The second son became King George I of Greece and the grandson Carl became King of Norway. From this time forward, the House of Glücksburg is related to almost all major European dynasties.

=== In the possession of Wilhelm I ===
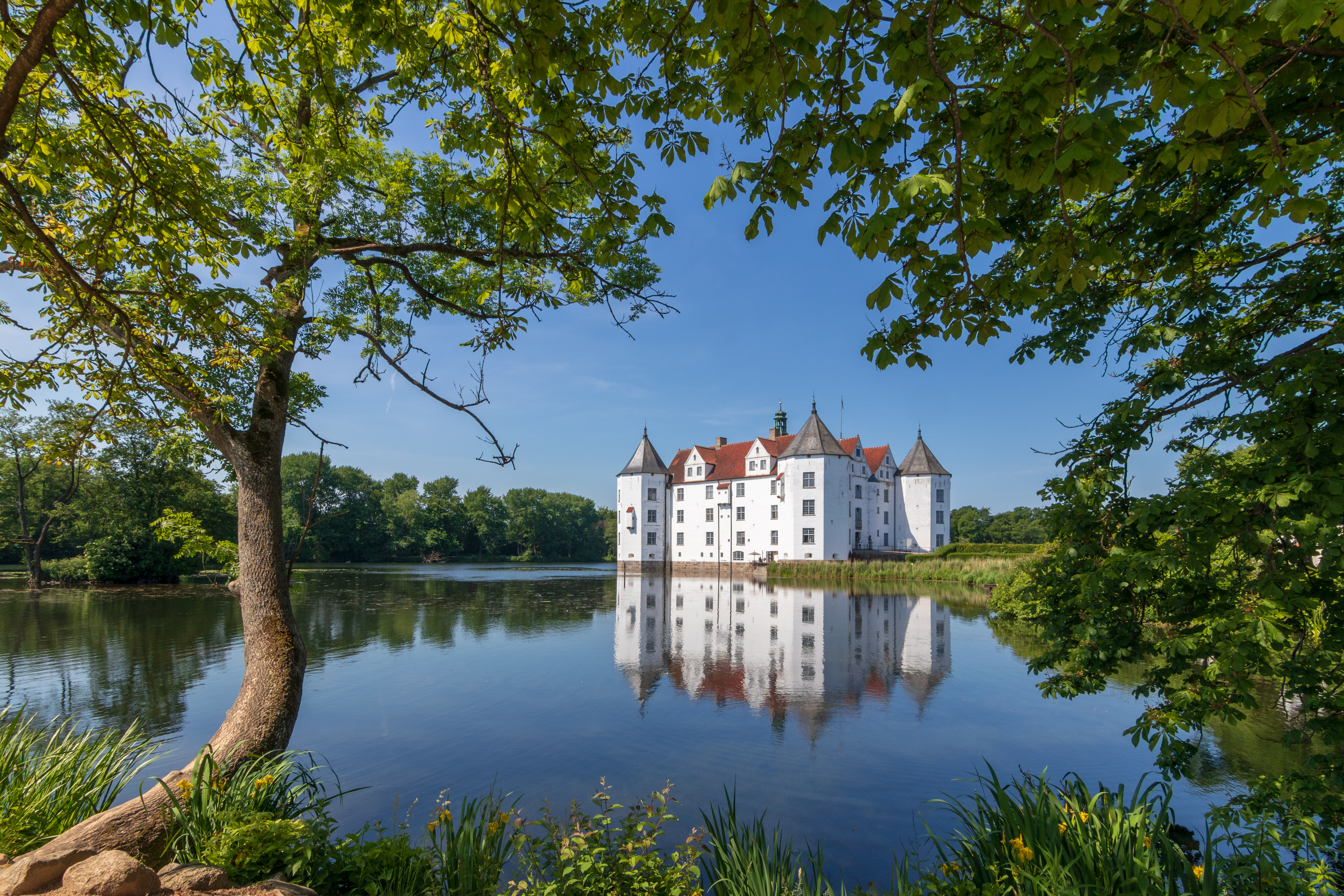
View from east

During the Second Schleswig War in 1864, the castle served as quarters for Prince Charles of Prussia and was later even used as a hospital and barracks. With the war, the long personal union of the Danish royal family and the Schleswig-Holstein duchies ended, and the castle passed into Prussian ownership. On September 16, 1868, the Prussian King (later emperor) Wilhelm I visited the castle during a visit to Flensburg to decide on its future fate and use.

The Flensburger Nachrichten newspaper reported on September 22: "[...] Glücksburg had festively adorned itself for the arrival of the king; There were three gates of honor, one at Ruhethal, the second in front of the entrance to the town, the third at the driveway to the castle, and flags and floral decorations in abundance. The king arrived the 16th, at 3 p.m., at the second gate of honor, Pastor Vogel gave a brief address, which the monarch graciously returned. A few peasant girls had gathered at the castle to offer the father of the country butter, bread, cheese and fruit as well as fishing products. [...] The whole stay in the village and at the castle lasted only a small hour. "

King Wilhelm I showed no further personal interest in the property, and the War Ministry no longer needed it. In 1869, the king transferred the castle back to the ducal family, by means of a "highest decree".

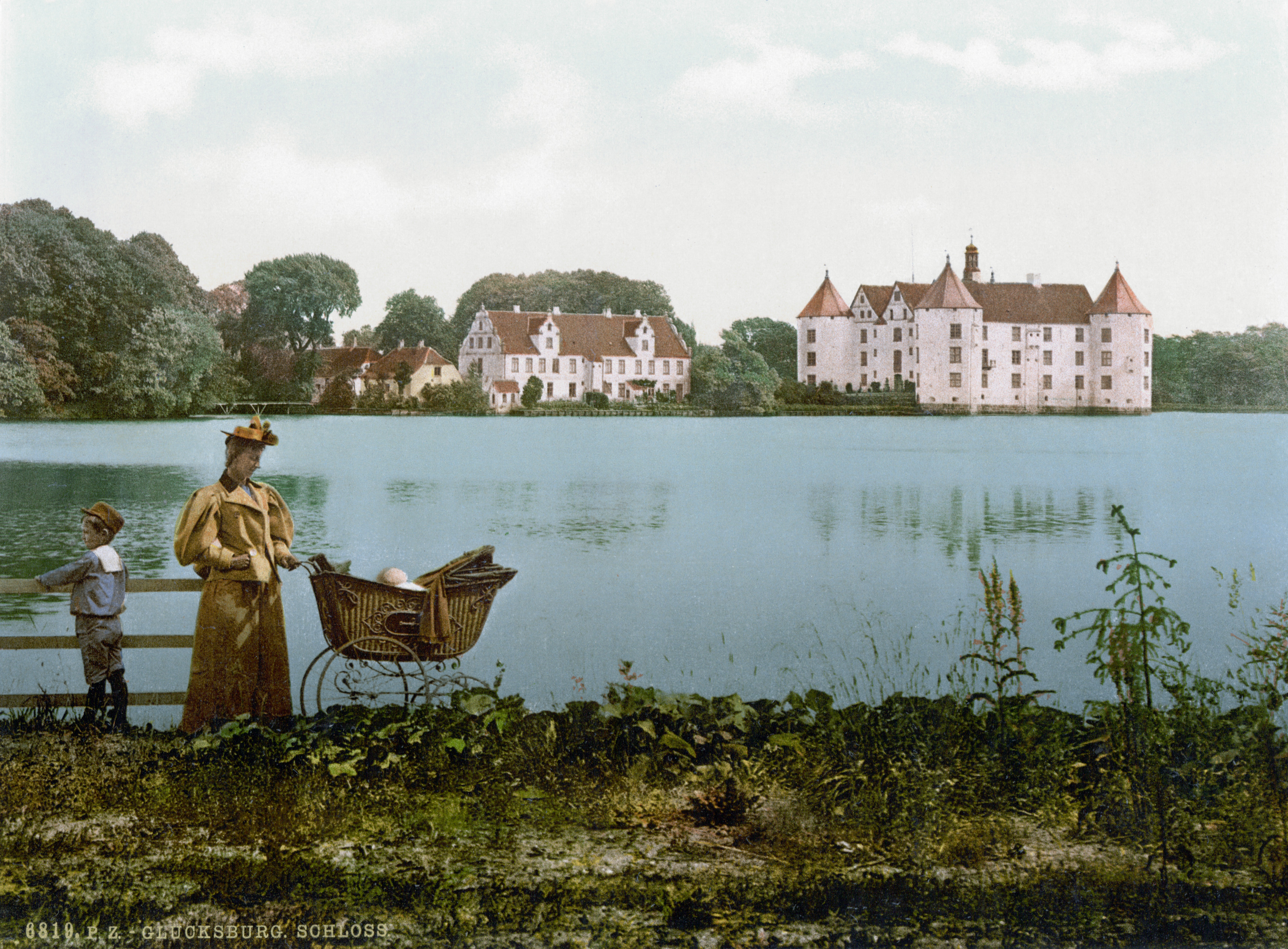
View c. 1900

Duke Karl, a brother of King Christian IX, used the palace again as a permanent residence from 1871. When he moved in, he and his wife Wilhelmine were welcomed by the Friedrichsgarde.

=== World wars ===
The structures of the Glücksburg Castle made it through the world wars without suffering any substantial damages. Only the castle's bells were seized and melted down during World War I.

Towards the end of World War II, under the Doenitz administration, Germany moved the seat of government to Mürwik in the city of Flensburg. During this period, Albert Speer resided inside the castle. Here he was arrested by the allied forces on May 23, 1945, and brought to Flensburg. Until the summer of 1945, the castle was used as a prison for 200 former members of the Wehrmacht. In May 1945, British troops looted the castle, and took numerous valuables, many of which were later returned. Furthermore, 32 caskets in the tomb had been opened. While the looting took place, British troops detained the ducal family at gunpoint. The return of the looted items followed an appeal to Queen Mary, mother of the British King George VI, who was a niece of Friedrich Ferdinand.

=== Foundation and museum ===
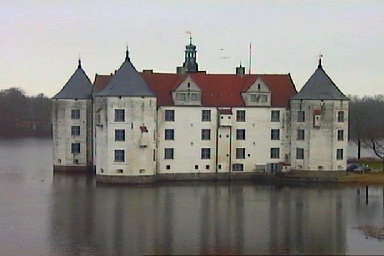
The castle before the façade renovations in 2005

In 1922, the family brought the castle into a foundation to preserve Glücksburg and allow the public to participate in the cultural monument. As part of this, most of the castle was converted into a museum, with concerts and other cultural events having been held in the building and its orangery. One of the venues for the Schleswig-Holstein Musik Festival is at Glücksburg Castle.

In the non-profit foundation statutes, the task of the foundation is formulated as follows:

The purpose of the foundation is to promote art and culture as well as monument protection. The purpose of the foundation is realized in particular through the endeavor to preserve Glücksburg Castle and the inventory belonging to the foundation's assets in accordance with their high cultural and historical status, to use them and make them accessible to the public. ...

The board of directors of the foundation is provided by the ducal family itself. The current managing director is Christoph zu Schleswig-Holstein, who has held this office since 1980. In addition to the family, the board of trustees also includes representatives of the state of Schleswig-Holstein and the district administrator of the Schleswig-Flensburg district. The family still has the domiciliary rights. The foundation is responsible for the care and protection of the castle, which - like many water castles - has to struggle with constant moisture. As a last major measure - after a legal dispute with the state regarding the assumption of costs - the facades of Glücksburg were extensively renovated from 2005. Half of the financial resources of around 440,000 euros were provided by the EU and the other half by the State Office for the Preservation of Monuments, the German Foundation for Monument Protection, the Friends of Schloss Glücksburg e. V. and various smaller foundations.

=== Construction history ===
==== Construction contract ====
On December 21, 1582, a contract was signed with Nikolaus Karies for the construction of the castle. Johann III assigned Karies with the demolition of the monastery and lead the work on the new building. The Duke provided him with 6,000 Luebian marks for the construction work - which at that time was the equivalent of around 1200 cattle.

==== Typical mansion in Schleswig-Holstein ====
Occasionally French models are cited as the inspiration behind the castle - the floor plan of the castle is similar to the central building of Chambord - but it is a typical building of its era and region. The architecture is typical for Schleswig-Holstein from the Middle Ages and the Renaissance. "Sister buildings" can be found, for example, in the Nütschau Priory and above all in Ahrensburg Castle, which was built almost simultaneously. Glücksburg Castle is the largest and probably most well known structure of this form of Schleswig-Holstein architecture. The motto of the builder Johann III was G ott g ebe G lück m it F rieden (God Gives Luck With Peace). The letters G G G M F are therefore placed above the main entrance. The name of the castle is derived from this motto. Glück means luck, and Glücksburg thus means Luck Castle.

The building was built in a stylistic transition period. While Johann's uncle Adolf I, for example, built more modern, three-winged buildings, with the Husum Castle or the Reinbek Castle, the nephew stuck to more traditional building forms of the region. And although it was planned and executed as a manorial residence, the location in the water, the embrasure like openings in the tower basements, the originally merlon towers and the high-lying first floor and the now-gone drawbridge of the courtyard still remind of a past in which a noble residence also had to be fortified.

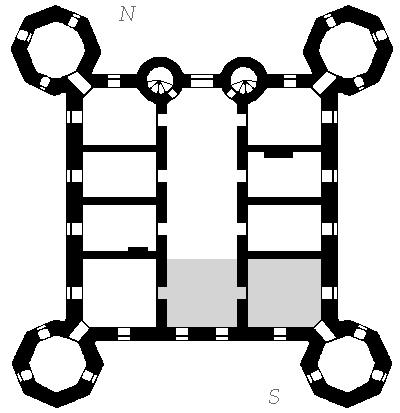
Schematic floor plan of the upper floors. Light gray marks the location of the castle chapel in the basement.

==== Design ====
The building stands on a 2.5-meter-high granite base and rises directly out of the water. The castle is made of white plastered brick, which was largely removed and reused from the demolished monastery. The base area is a square with an edge length of almost 30 meters, consisting of three individual houses, each with its own floor plan and roof. While the middle house accommodated the large halls and the vestibule, the two side houses were fitted with the living rooms. The palace chapel, with its east-facing altar wall, is the only room that was placed across the overall floor plan and is located in the east and middle house at the same time.

In the four corners of Glücksburg Castle are four octagonal towers, each seven meters in diameter. The courtyard side of the castle is also preceded by two bay-like stair towers, which form the only connection between the upper floors. In total, the castle includes two halls, the vestibule, the castle chapel and twelve middle rooms, twelve tower rooms and eleven corner rooms. The total living space of the building is around 3,000 m^{2} (32290 sq. ft.).

The gable ends of the facades as well as the wall dormers were once curved and provided with decorative elements typical of the Renaissance, but these decorations were removed in the course of a classicist purification in the 19th century, resulting in the current, somewhat austere appearance of the castle. In 1768 the middle roof received the baroque ridge turret, the wall dormers removed in the 19th century were renewed from 1906 onwards. Aside from changes to the decorations, the exterior of the castle has remained largely unchanged for more than 400 years.

=== Interiors ===
The floors of the castle were once assigned to different functions.

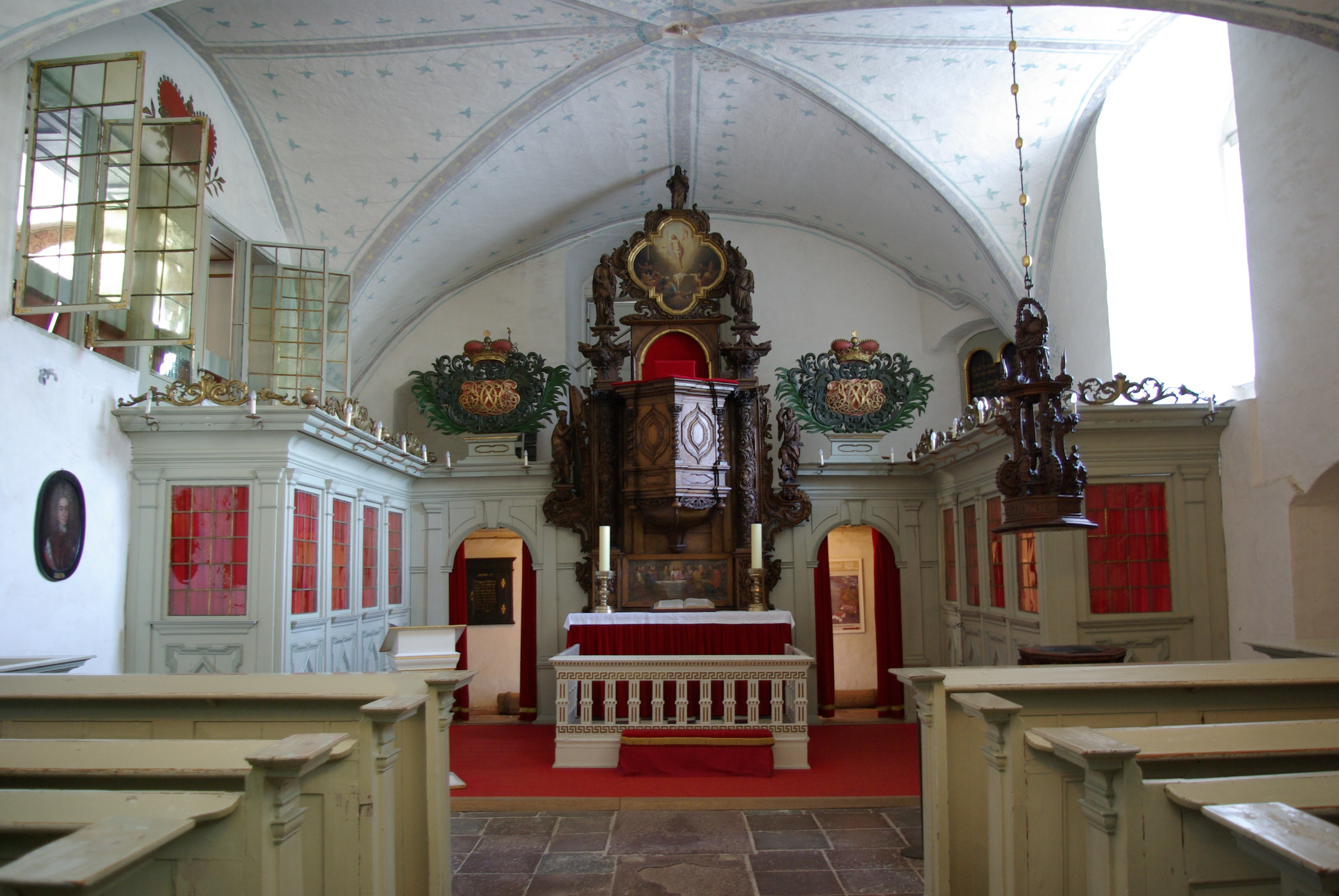
The castle's chapel, overlooking the altar

.

The chapel also served as the official parish church of the city of Glücksburg until 1965. It is still used today for church services, weddings and baptisms. In the western tower room of the basement, civil weddings can be carried out in consultation with the castle administration.

==== Second floor ====
Not much is known about the use of the second floor at the time of construction, but it is believed that it was originally mainly used as a storage room and granary. This function resulted from the fact that in the time of John III, a tax in kind was quite common. The floor plan follows the floor below: the middle house is also dominated by a large hall, with four rooms and the tower rooms adjoining each side. From the 18th century onwards, the floor contained a few guest rooms. The so-called Margrave's Room is a reminder of Margrave Frederick Ernest, who served as governor of Schleswig-Holstein and temporarily lodged at Glücksburg. From 1857 the living quarters of the princes and princesses were set up on the upper floor.

The middle White Hall lacks the vaulted ceiling of its "red" counterpart, which makes it appear larger and deeper. The hall is now less elaborately furnished, the most important decoration is a collection of tapestries from 1740. The White Hall was often used as a dining room and is now used for concert performances.

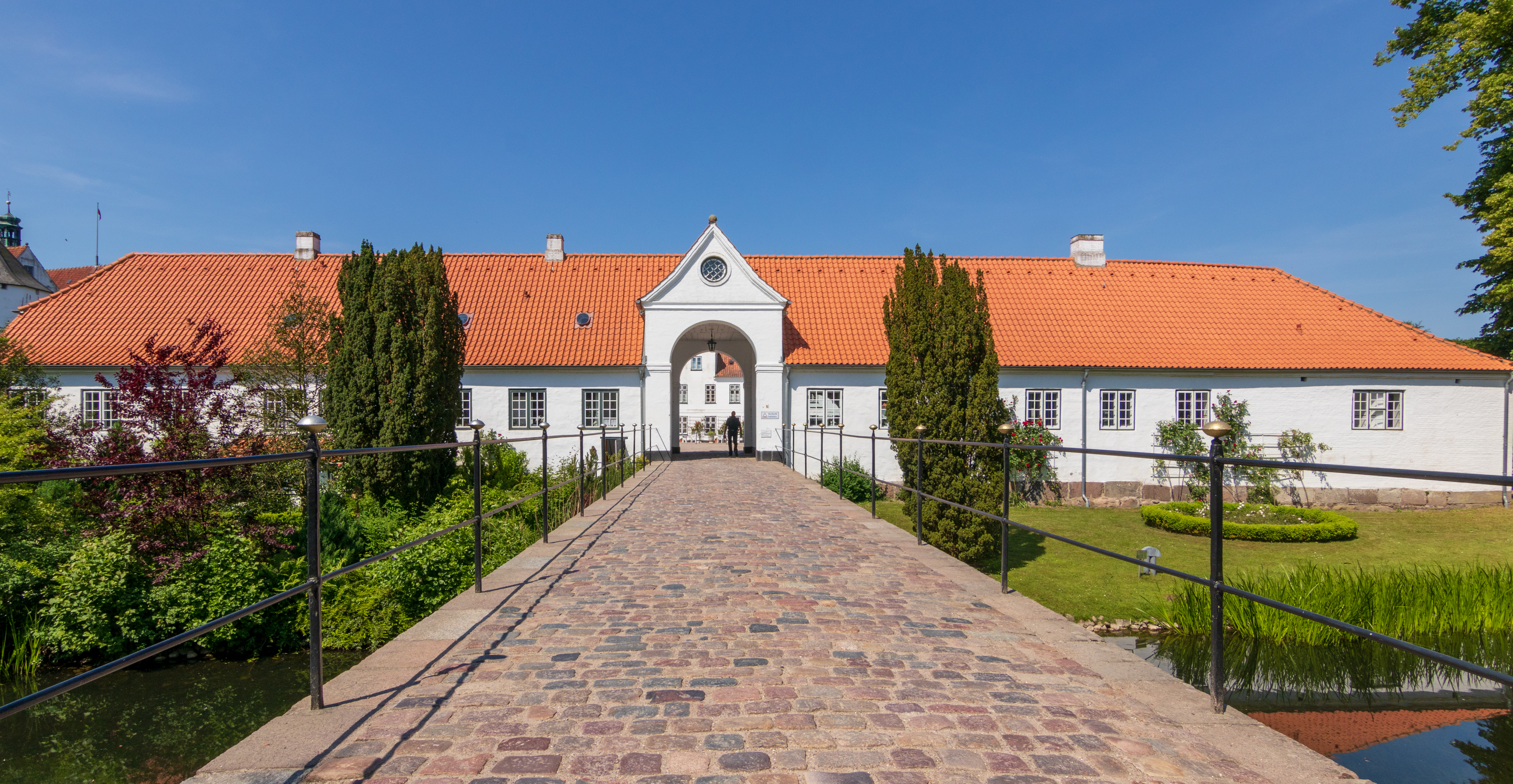
View of the gate house

== Surroundings ==
=== Garden ===
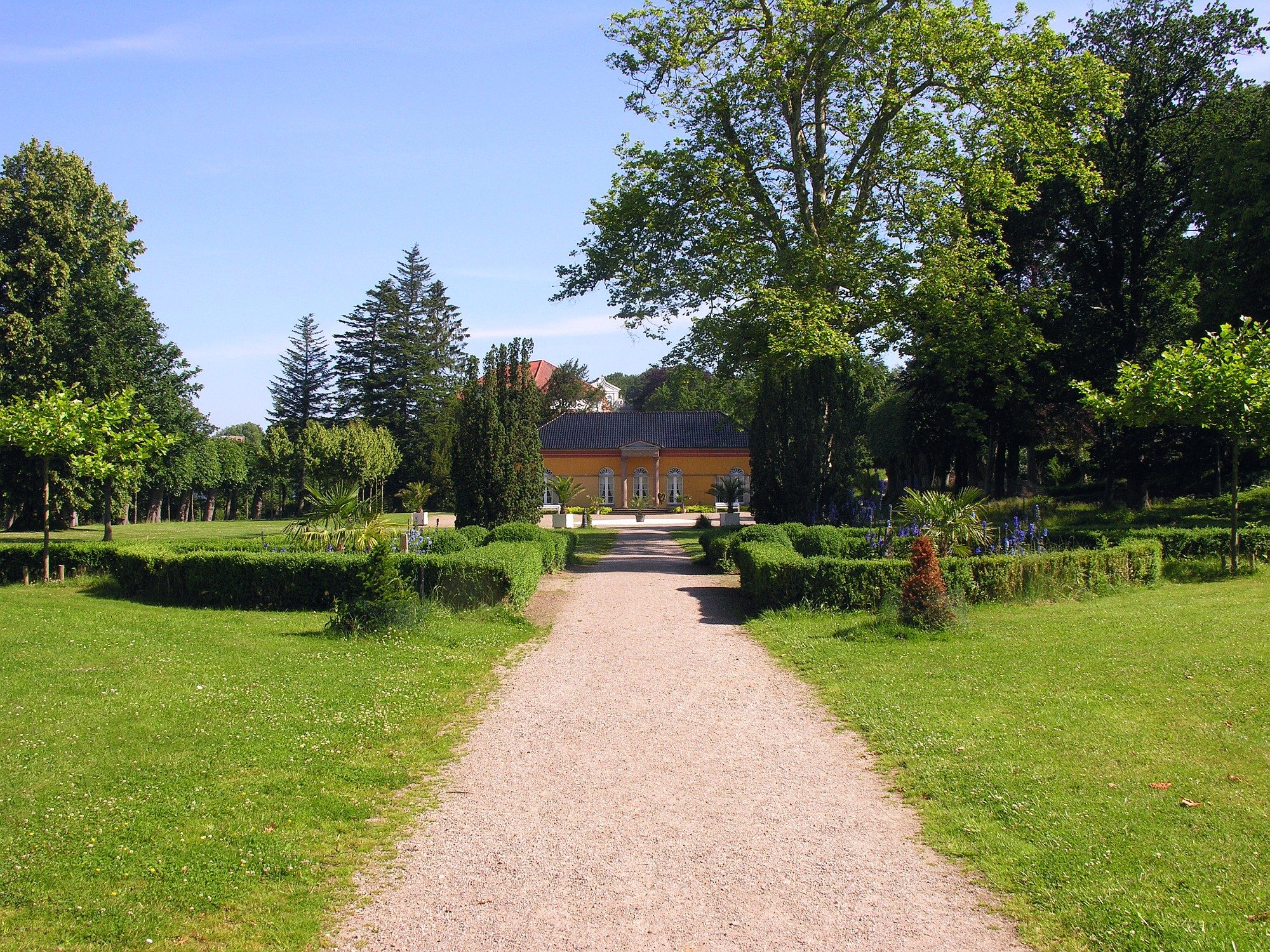
The park with orangerie (photo 2012)

Already during the time of the Rüdekloster, the monastery had a garden, which was lost after the grounds were laid down and the castle pond was dammed. With the exception of a kitchen garden from 1622, the palace was only given a larger park area in the 18th century. Under the gardener Jürgen Lorentzen, a small pleasure garden was laid out on the site of the later rose garden from 1706 to 1709. Since Glücksburg is surrounded by water on three sides and the outer bailey is in front of the fourth side, the larger park was placed behind the outer bailey from 1733 without direct reference to the castle. This baroque garden essentially consisted of a large parterre, which was aligned with an orangery building erected in 1743.

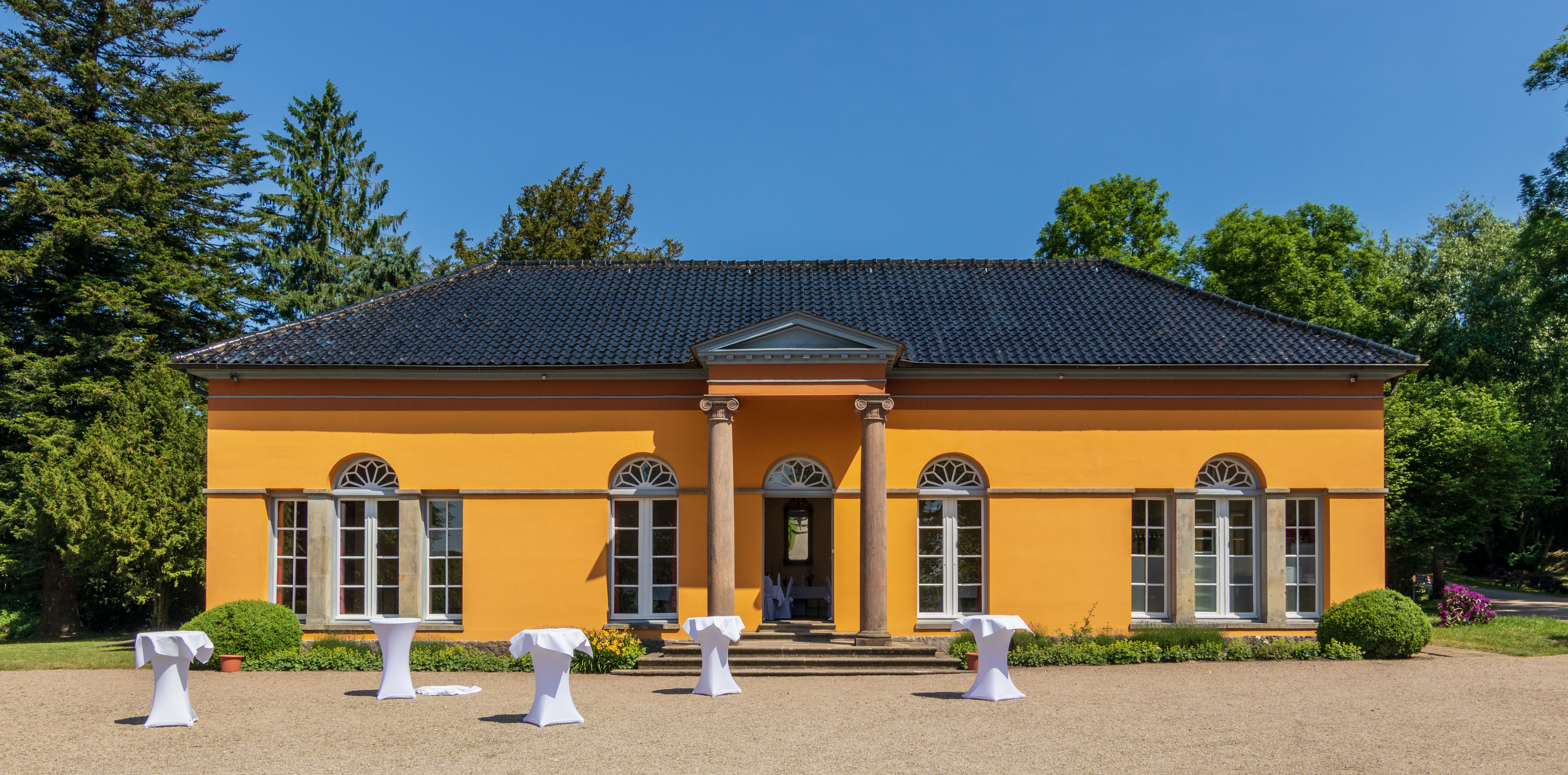
The Orangerie building in the garden

=== Castle pond ===
The castle pond was artificially created in the 16th century by damming the water of the Schwennau and Munkbrarupau. It was supposed to protect the castle and at the same time served as a fish pond for food supply. As a result of the flooding, the former monastery grounds sank completely, the castle and the outer bailey were both completely surrounded by water after the complex was completed. Over the centuries, sediment created a permanent connection between the castle and the outer bailey.

In 1962, 1969 and most recently in 2005, the pond was drained so that renovation work could be carried out on the palace facades. The foundations of the monastery church and the remains of a hypocaust system were discovered and excavations were made. Some of the exhibits from the excavations are on display in the castle.

== Literature ==
- Henning von Rumohr: Schlösser und Herrenhäuser im Herzogtum Schleswig. Droemer Knaur, 1983.
- Wolfgang J. Müller: Schloß Glücksburg. Bauform als fürstlicher Machtanspruch. In: Oswald Hauser, Waltraud Hunke, Wolfgang J. Müller: Das Haus Glücksburg und Europa. Mühlau, Kiel 1988, ISBN 3-87559-058-9, S. 71–87.
- Dehio: Handbuch der Deutschen Kunstdenkmäler Hamburg, Schleswig-Holstein. Deutscher Kunstverlag, München 1994.
- Wolfgang J. Müller: Schloß Glücksburg (Große Baudenkmäler, Heft 145). 19. Auflage, München/Berlin 1995.
- Adrian von Buttlar, Margita Marion Meyer (Hrsg.): Historische Gärten in Schleswig-Holstein. 2. Auflage. Boyens & Co., Heide 1998, ISBN 3-8042-0790-1, S. 265–269.
- Johannes Habich, Deert Lafrenz, Heiko K. L. Schulze, Lutz Wilde: Schlösser und Gutsanlagen in Schleswig-Holstein. L & H, Hamburg 1998, ISBN 3-928119-24-9.
- Eva von Engelberg-Dočkal: Kulturkarte Schleswig-Holstein. 1000mal Kultur entdecken. 2. Auflage, Wachholtz-Verlag, Neumünster 2005, ISBN 3-529-08006-3.
- Wolfgang Bauch: Prospektionen im See des Glücksburger Wasserschlosses – Die Entdeckung des Rudeklosters. In: Denkmal. Zeitschrift für Denkmalpflege in Schleswig-Holstein. 13/2006, ISSN 0946-4549, S. 34–36.
- Hans u. Doris Maresch: Schleswig-Holsteins Schlösser, Herrenhäuser und Palais. Husum Verlag, Husum 2006.
- Heiko K. L. Schulze: Die Bauten des Rudeklosters in Glücksburg im 13. Jahrhundert – Zur Architektur der Zisterzienser in Norddeutschland. In: Denkmal. Zeitschrift für Denkmalpflege in Schleswig-Holstein. 13/2006, ISSN 0946-4549, S. 40–48.
- Rolf Glawischnig: Auf der Suche nach dem Glücksburger Rudekloster. In: Denkmal. Zeitschrift für Denkmalpflege in Schleswig-Holstein. 13/2006, ISSN 0946-4549, S. 31–33.
- Astrid Hansen: Schloss Glücksburg – Kalkanstrich in Fortsetzung alter Tradition. In: Denkmal. Zeitschrift für Denkmalpflege in Schleswig-Holstein. 14/2007, ISSN 0946-4549, S. 128.
- Wolfgang Bauch: Archäologische Funde des Rudeklosters in Glücksburg – Ergebnisse der Oberflächenbegehungen von 2005. In: Denkmal. Zeitschrift für Denkmalpflege in Schleswig-Holstein. 19/2012, ISSN 0946-4549, S. 98–105.
