= Kiel Castle =

Coordinates: 54°19′27″N 10°08′36″E

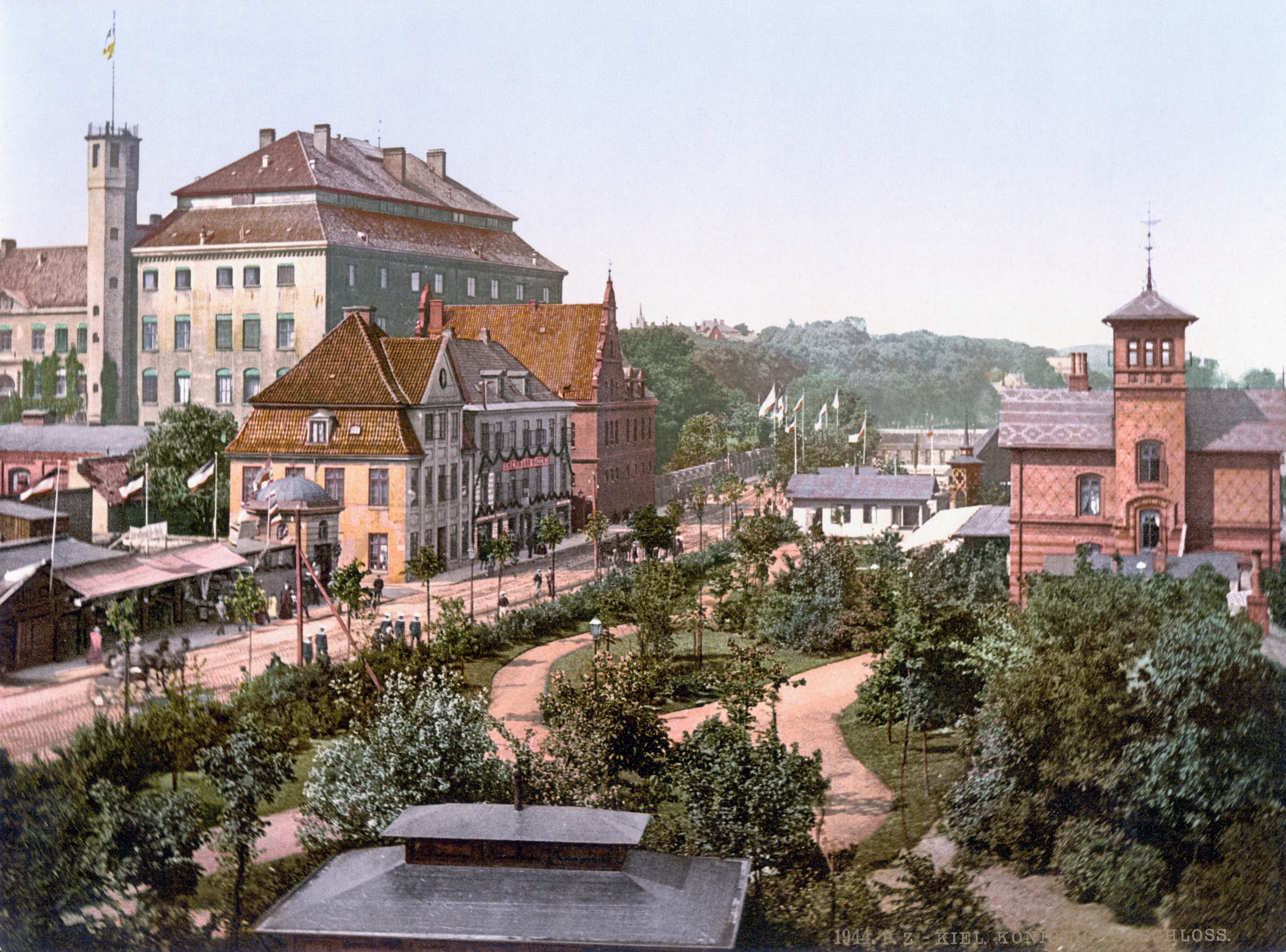
Kiel Castle (left rear) c. 1900

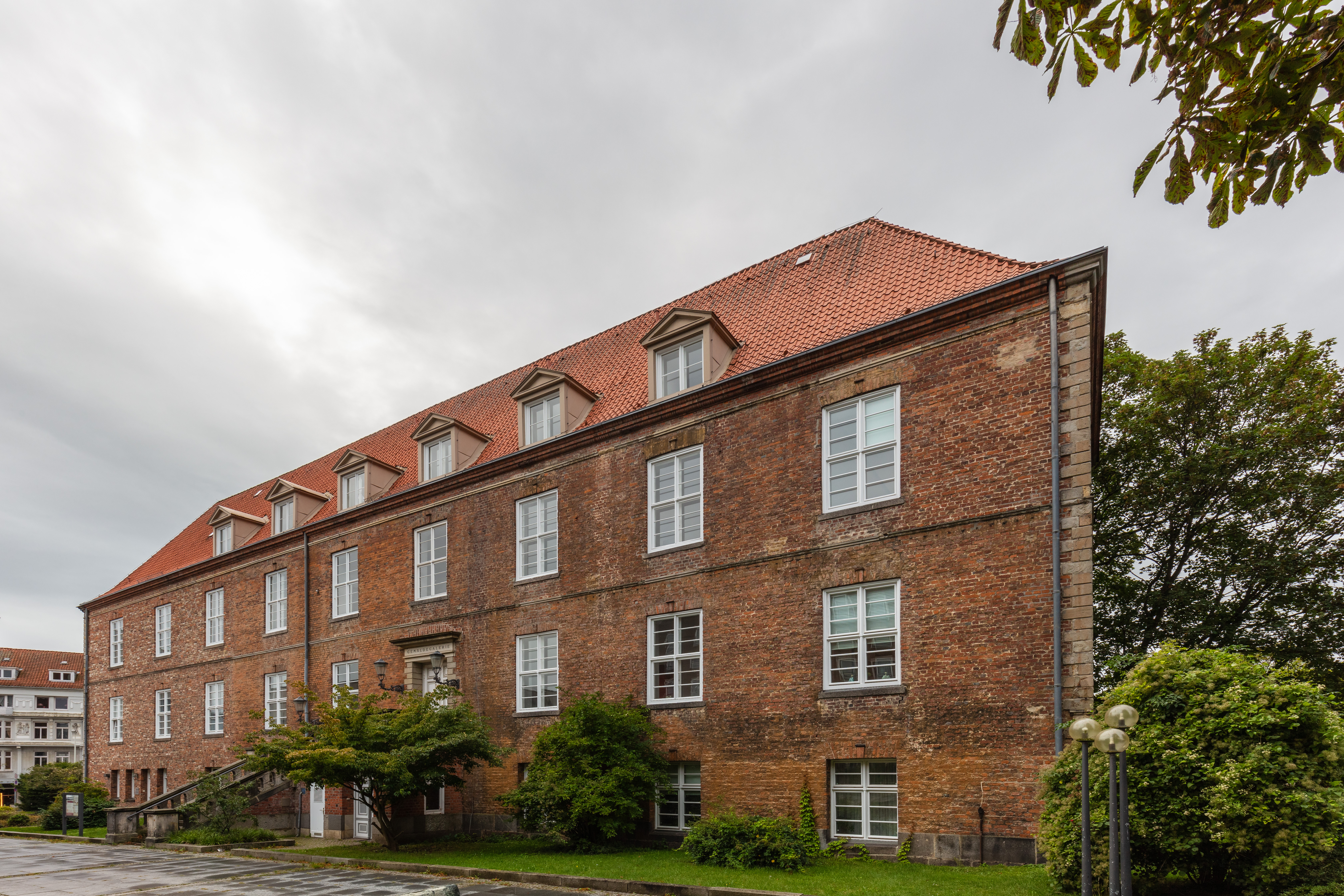
The preserved Rantzau building, a relict of the old Kiel Castle

Kiel Castle (German: Kieler Schloss) in Kiel in the north German state of Schleswig-Holstein was one of the secondary residences of the Gottorf dukes. The castle exhibited a very varied architectural history and in the more recent architectural period became one of the most important secular buildings in Schleswig-Holstein. The castle burned down during the Second World War and its ruins were largely carried away and replaced by a new building.

== Sources ==
- Deert Lafrenz: Das Kieler Schloß. Christians, Hamburg 1987, ISBN 3-7672-1027-4
