= Glücksburg =

Glücksburg Lyksborg (Danish)
- Town
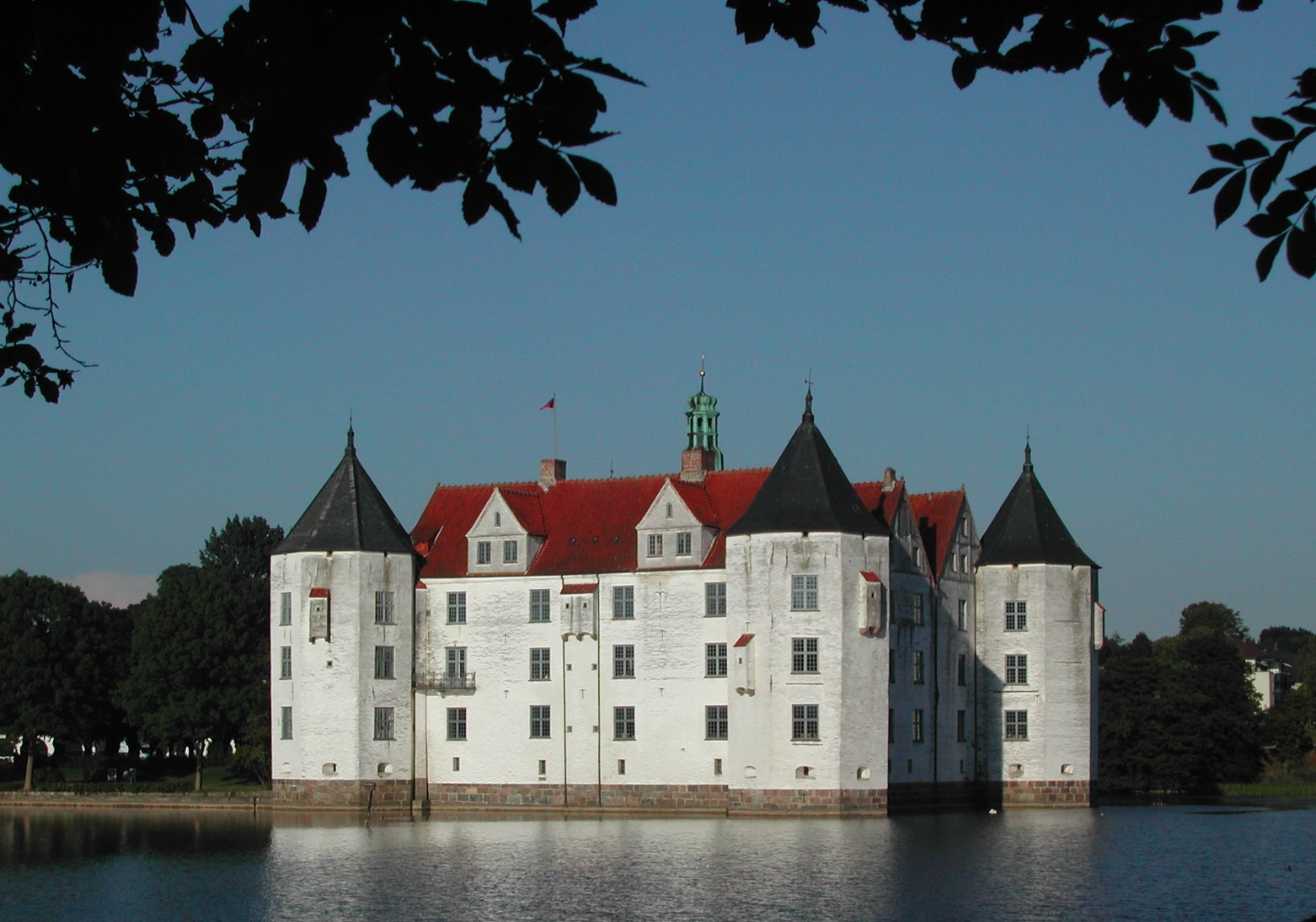
- Glücksburg Castle

- Coat of arms

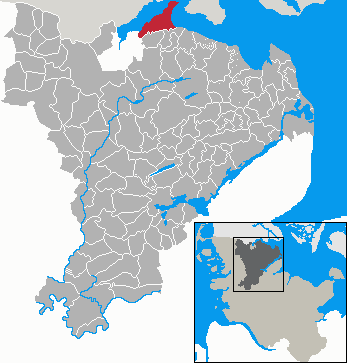
- Location of Glücksburg within Schleswig-Flensburg district
- Interactive map of Glücksburg
- Location within Germany Location within Schleswig-Holstein
- Coordinates: 54°50′1″N 9°33′0″E
- Country: Germany
- State: Schleswig-Holstein
- District: Schleswig-Flensburg

Government
  - Mayor: Kristina Franke

Area
  - Total: 39.68 km^{2} (15.32 sq mi)
- Elevation: 19 m (62 ft)

Population (2025-12-31)
  - Total: 6,317
  - Density: 159.2/km^{2} (412.3/sq mi)
- Time zone: UTC+01:00 (CET)
  - Summer (DST): UTC+02:00 (CEST)
- Postal codes: 24960
- Dialling codes: 04631
- Vehicle registration: SL
- Website: stadt.gluecksburg.de

Glücksburg (German pronunciation: [ˈɡlʏksˌbʊʁk]; Danish: Lyksborg) is a small town northeast of Flensburg in the district of Schleswig-Flensburg, in Schleswig-Holstein, Germany.

It is situated on the south side of the Flensborg Fjord, an inlet of the Baltic Sea, approx. 10 km northeast of Flensburg. The town was originally the home of the family Schleswig-Holstein-Sonderburg-Glücksburg (or simply Glücksburg), members of which have reigned in the past in Greece and several northern German states. Members of the family still reign in Denmark and Norway since 1863 and 1905 respectively, and have reigned in the United Kingdom and the 14 other Commonwealth realms since the accession of Charles III in 2022. (Note: The 14 other realms are Antigua and Barbuda, Australia, The Bahamas, Belize, Canada, Grenada, Jamaica, New Zealand, Papua New Guinea, Saint Kitts and Nevis, Saint Lucia, Saint Vincent and the Grenadines, the Solomon Islands and Tuvalu.)

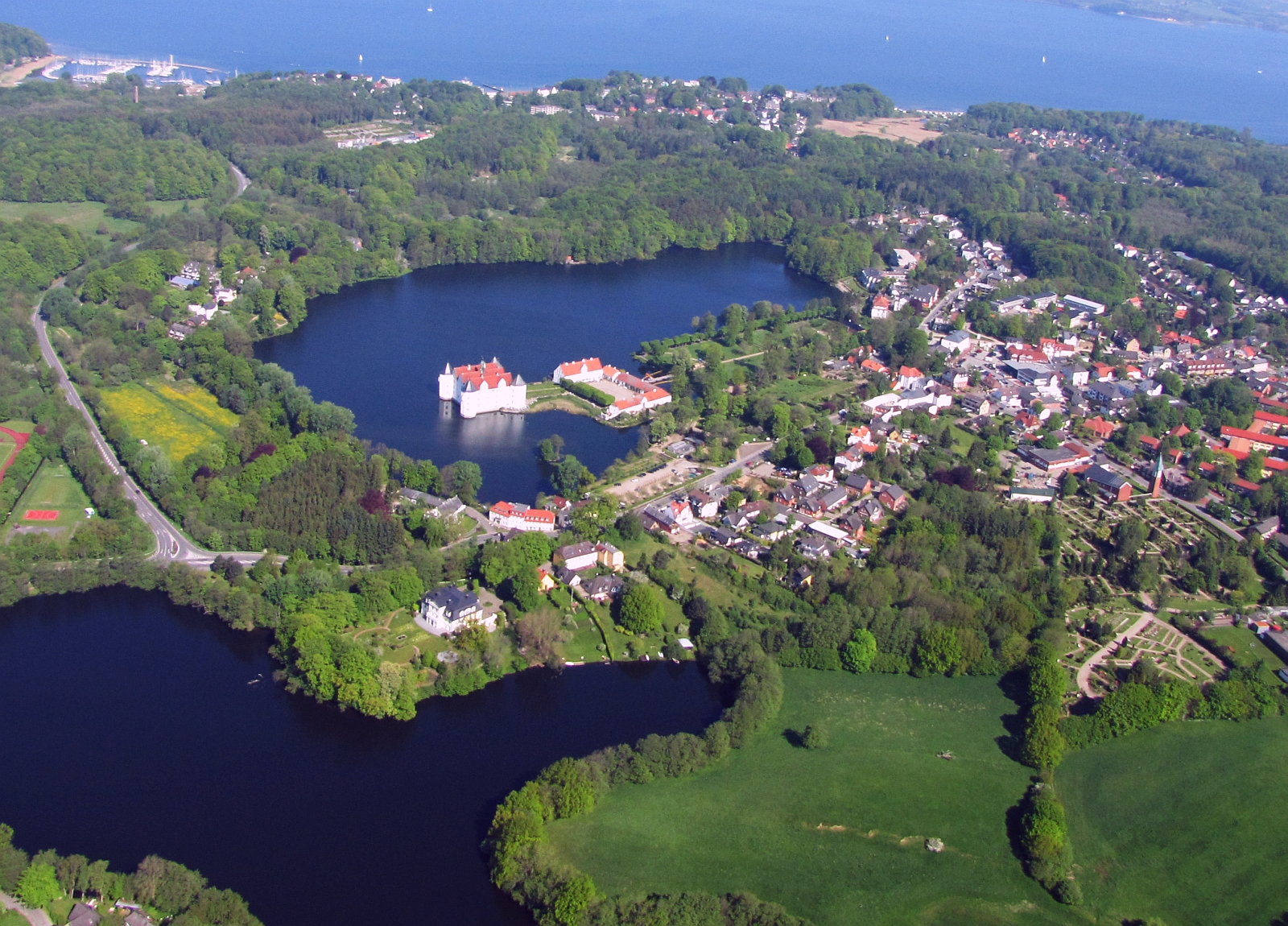
Glücksburg in 2012

Glücksburg was home to a German Navy base. Among the facilities at the base was the transmitter, callsign DHJ58. DHJ58, situated at 54° 50'N and 9° 32' E, ceased its transmissions on longwave frequency 68.9 kHz in 2002 and in 2004 its longwave antenna was disassembled.

== Notable people ==
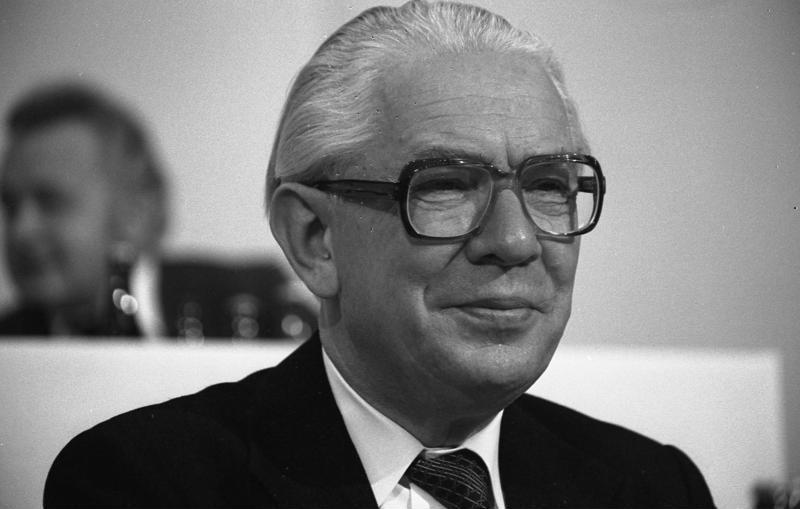
Kai-Uwe von Hassel in 1978

- Kai-Uwe von Hassel (1913–1997), politician (CDU), was mayor of Glücksburg, Minister President of Schleswig-Holstein, Federal Minister, President of the Bundestag.
- Gui Bonsiepe (born 1934), designer and design theorist.

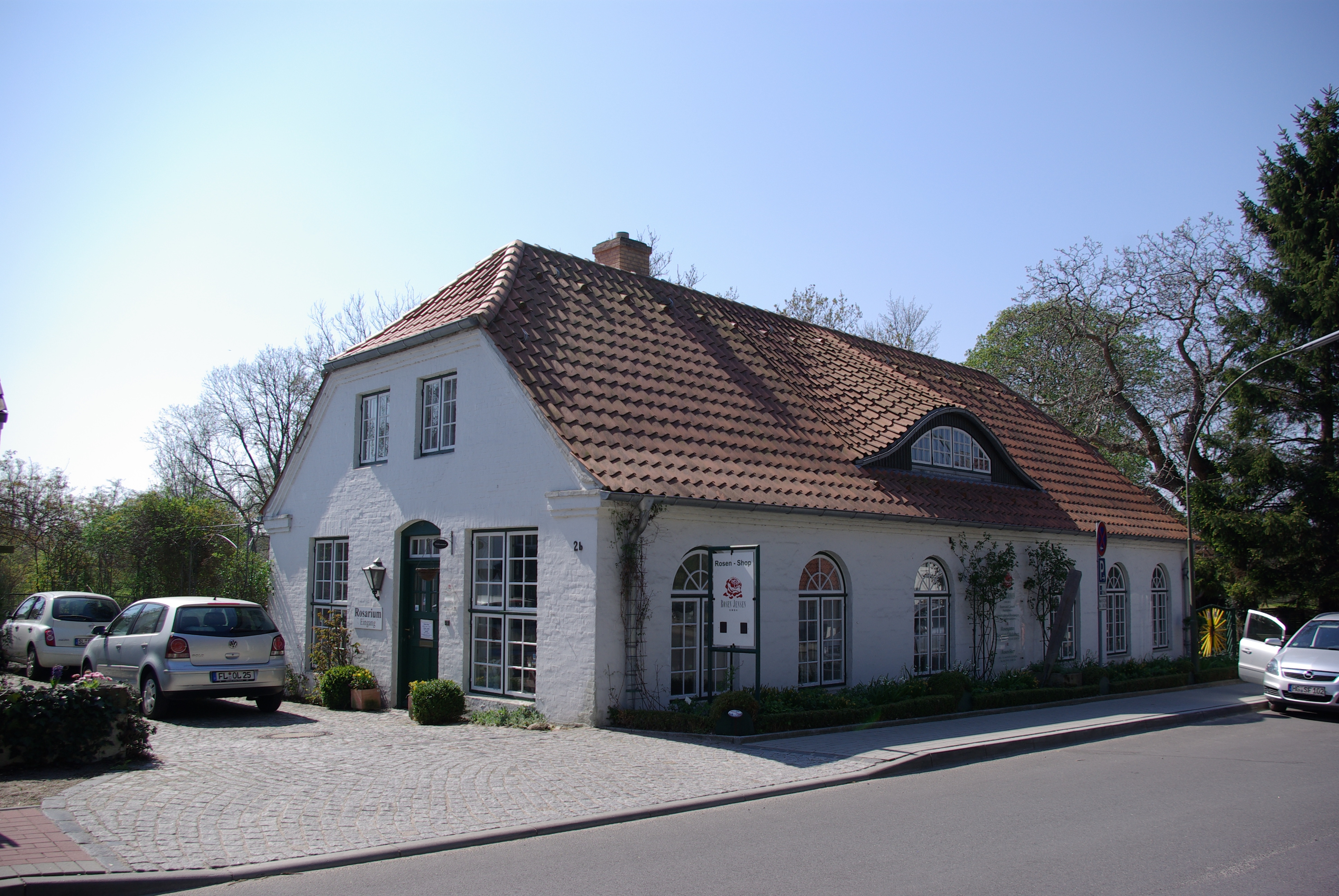
Glücksburg palace garden building

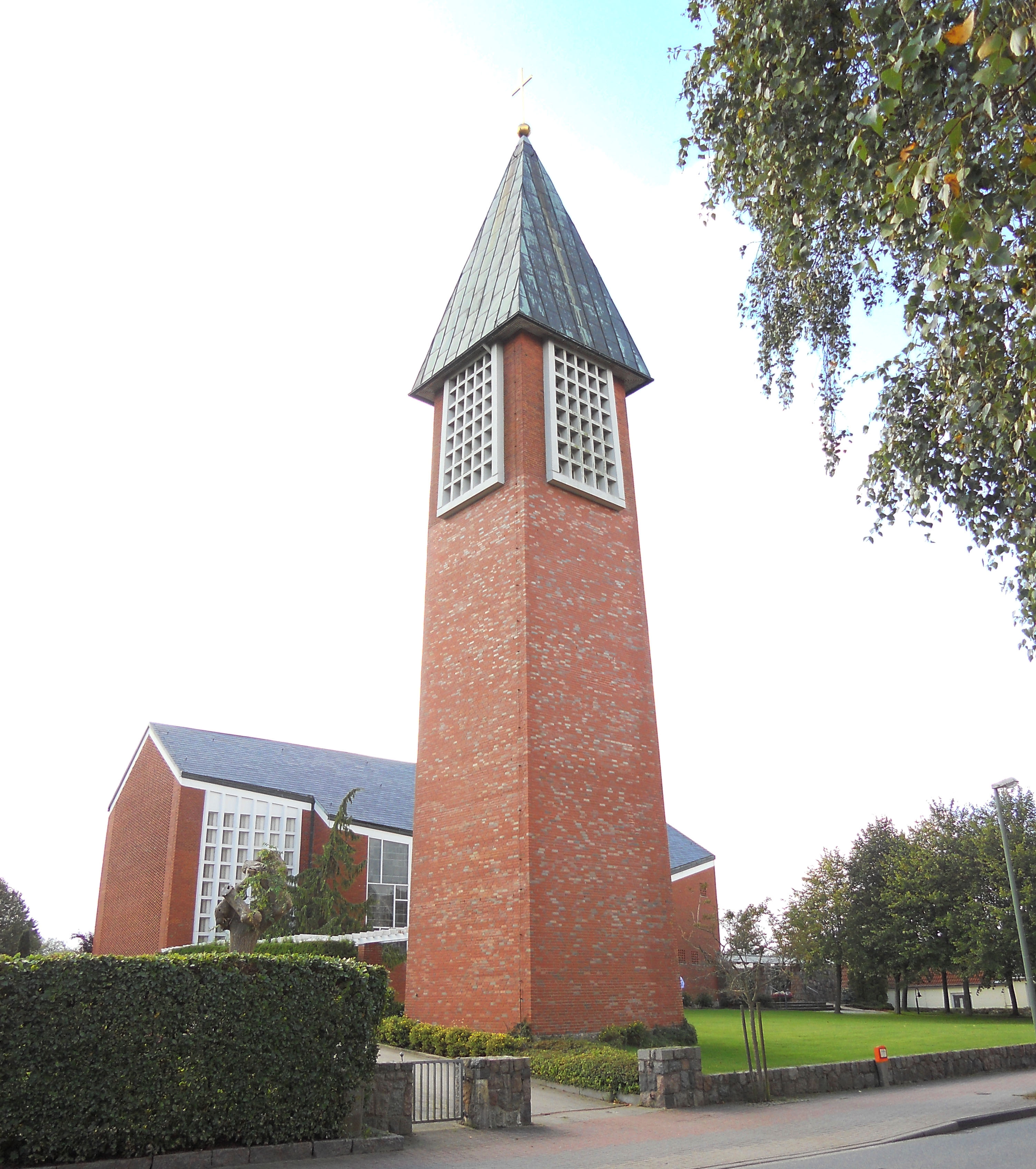
Glücksburg Evangelical church
