= Jean Mariette =

French engraver (1660–1742)

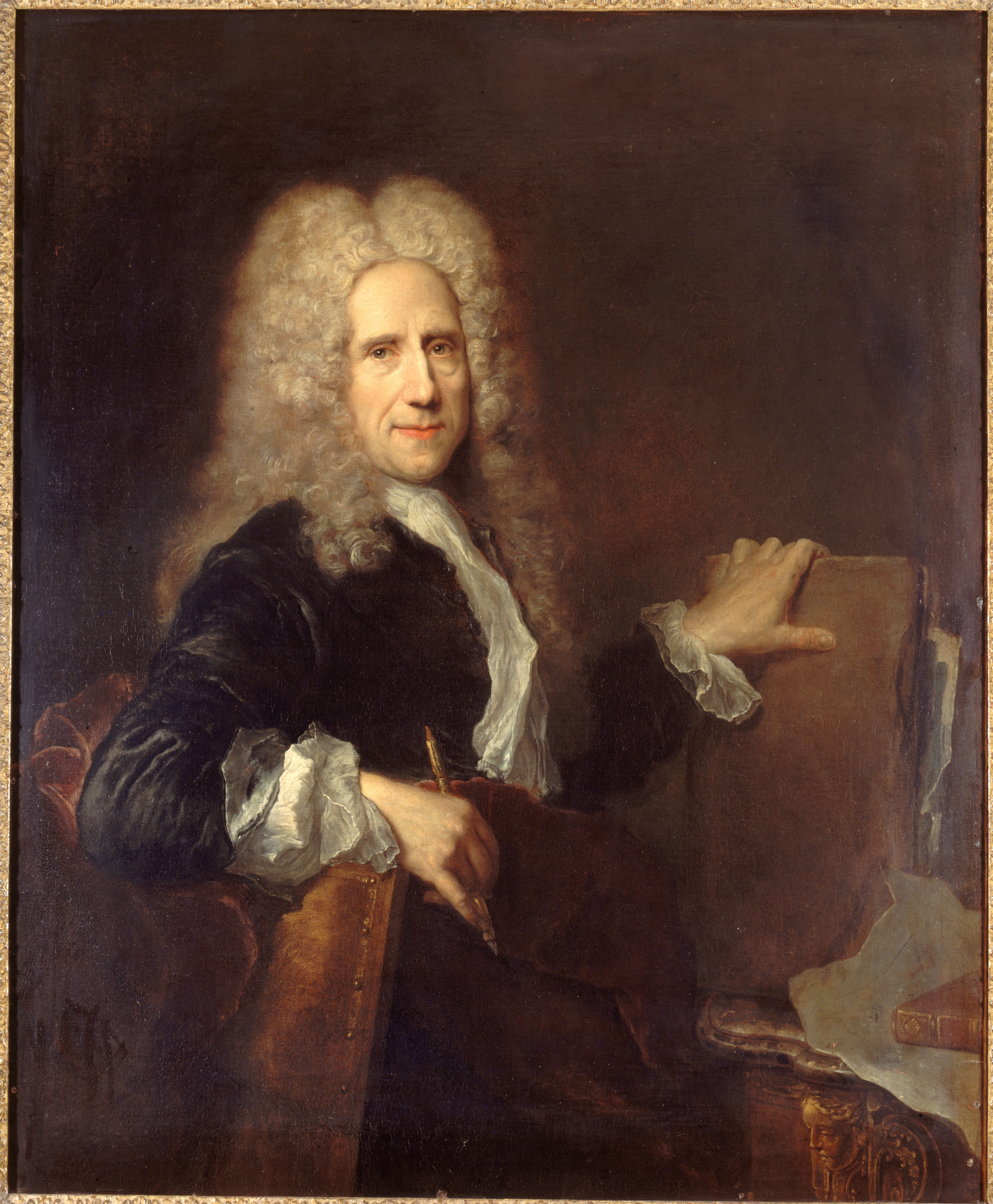
Antoine Pesne, Jean Mariette, 1723, oil on canvas. Musée Carnavalet, Paris.

Jean Mariette (French pronunciation: [ʒɑ̃ maʁjɛt]; 22 June 1660 – 19 September 1742) was a French engraver and print dealer and publisher. He was the father of Pierre-Jean Mariette.

== Ancestry and early life ==
Jean Mariette was born in Paris, the son of Pierre II Mariette (1634–1716) and grandson of Pierre I Mariette (1596–1657), both wealthy print publishers.

He studied drawing, painting, and engraving with his brother-in-law Jean-Baptiste Corneille, but after Charles Le Brun saw some of his engravings and advised him to focus on that, he stopped painting.

After his father's death, he took over one of the family's print businesses, the 'Librairie des Colonnes d'Hercule', whereas his older brother, Pierre-Joseph Mariette (1656–1729), inherited the business at the sign of 'L'Espérance'. Both were on the rue Saint-Jacques, Paris.

== Print publishing ==
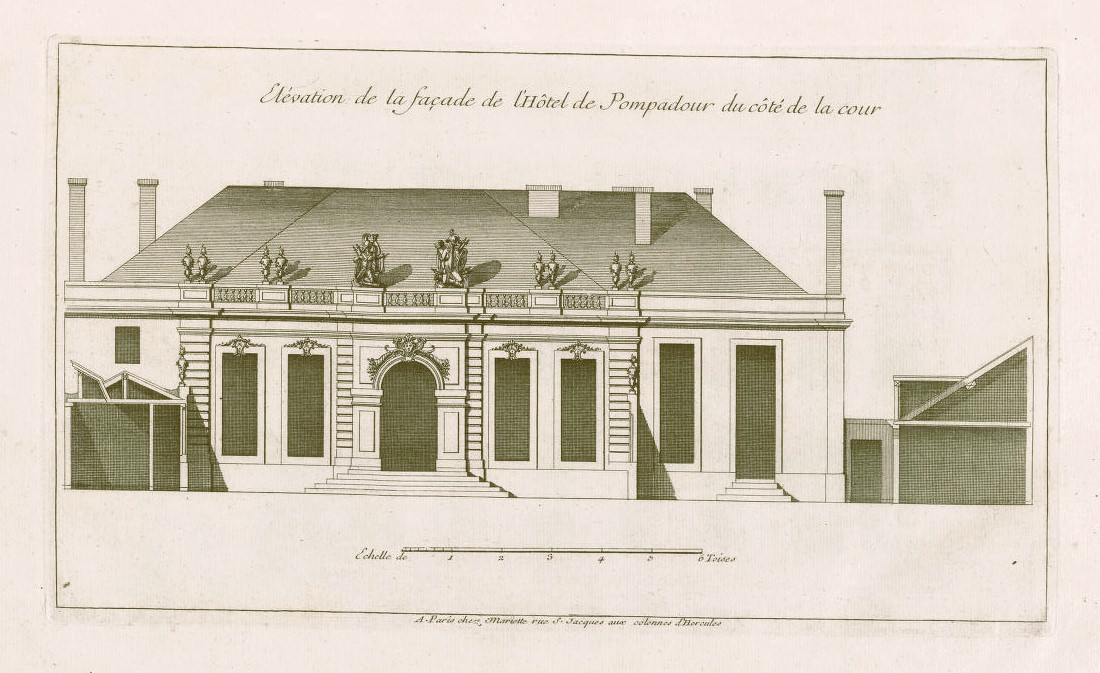
The courtyard façade of the corps de logis of the single-storey residence Hôtel Chanac de Pompadour, later called Hôtel de Besenval, according to the plans of 1704 by Pierre-Alexis Delamair (engraving published by Jean Mariette in 1727)

Over the course of his career he published almost 900 prints, including 35 reproductions of paintings by artists such as Nicolas Poussin, Domenico Zampieri, Charles Le Brun, Michel Corneille the Younger, Louis Chéron, Antoine Dieu, Guido Reni, A. Caracci, Sébastien Bourdon, Giovanni Contarini, and Anthony van Dyck.

In 1727 Jean Mariette published three volumes under the title L'Architecture françoise, a collection of plans, elevations, and cross sections of French buildings, which is one of the most important sources concerning French classical architecture.

According to the architectural historian Emil Kaufmann, the majority of these prints were designed and engraved by Jacques-François Blondel (who published his own Architecture françoise in 1752–1756), although other engravers, including Pierre Lepautre, Antoine Hérisset, and Claude Lucas, and other designers, such as Delamonce, J. M. Chevotet, P. C. Prevostel, and Pineau, were also involved. A fourth volume, published the same year under the same title, was a reedition of the Grand Marot, and a fifth volume in a larger format was published in 1738.

== Bibliography ==
- Benezit (2006). "Mariette, Jean", vol. 10, p. 278, in Benezit Dictionary of Artists. Paris: Gründ. ISBN 9782700030709.
- Kaufmann, Emil (1949). "The Contribution of Jacques-François Blondel to Mariette's Architecture françoise". The Art Bulletin, vol. 31, no. 1 (March), pp. 58–59. JSTOR 3047214.
- Mariette, Jean (1727; 1927–1929 reedition). L'Architecture française, three volumes, edited by Louis Hautecoeur. Paris; Brussels: G. Vanoest. OCLC 933116050.
- Mauban, A. (1946). L'Architecture française de Jean Mariette. Paris: Vanoest. OCLC 421978806.
- Walsh, Amy L. (1996). "Mariette family", vol. 20, pp. 415–418, in The Dictionary of Art, 34 volumes, edited by Jane Turner. New York: Grove. ISBN 9781884446009.
