= Luninsky =

Luninsky (masculine), Luninskaya (feminine), or Luninskoye (neuter) may refer to:

- Luninsky District, a district of Penza Oblast, Russia
- Luninskaya, a rural locality (a village) in Moscow Oblast, Russia

== See also ==
- Lunino
