= Mariette =

Mariette or Mariëtte may signify:

Family name

- Auguste Mariette (1821–1881), pioneering Egyptologist.
- Pierre-Jean Mariette (1694–1774), connoisseur and chronicler of artistic life in Paris

Given name

- Mariette Bosch (died 2001), South African murderer executed by Botswana
- Mariëtte Drewes (born 1967), Dutch chess player
- Mariëtte Hamer (born 1958), Dutch politician and trade union leader
- Mariette Hansson (born 1983), sometimes MaryJet or simply mononym Mariette, Swedish singer and songwriter
- Mariette Lindstein (born 1958), Swedish author and ex-Scientologist
- Mariëtte Patijn (born 1966), Dutch politician

Others

- Mariette, a yacht built by Nathanael Greene Herreshoff in 1915
