= Eleonore von Schlieben =

German noblewoman (1720–1755)

Countess Eleonore von Schlieben
- Baroness of Keyserling
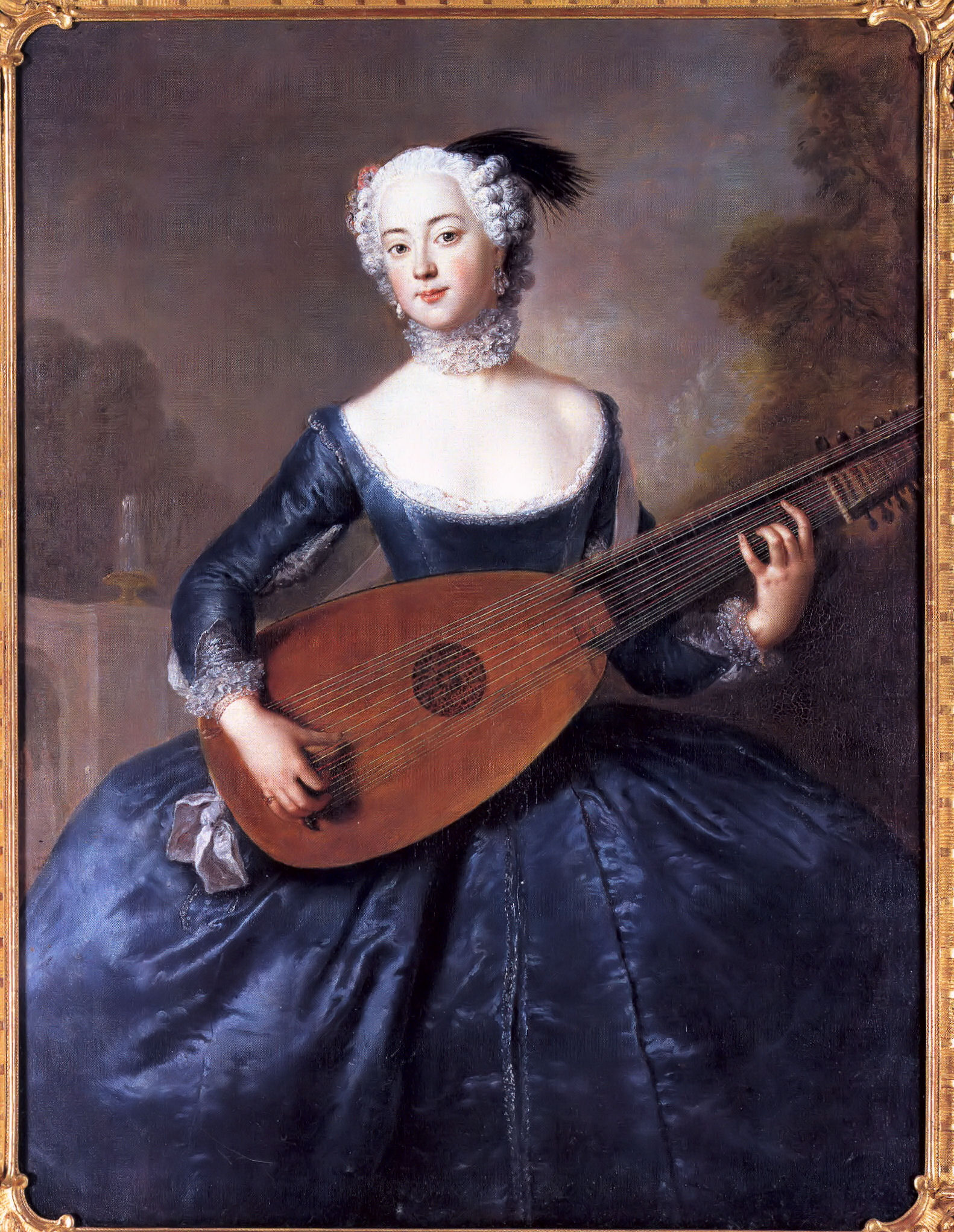
- Portrait of Eleonore von Schlieben by Antoine Pesne circa 1745
- Born: 1720
- Died: 15 February 1755 (aged 34–35); Berlin
- Noble family: Schlieben (by birth); Keyserling (by marriage)
- Spouse: Baron Dietrich Cesarion von Keyserling
- Issue: Baroness Adelaide Friederike von Keyserling
- Father: George Christoph, Count of Schlieben, Lord of Sanditten
- Mother: Eleonore Lucia von Ilten

Countess Eleonore Louise Albertine von Schlieben-Sanditten (1720 - 15 February 1755) was a German noblewoman and a lady in waiting to Elisabeth Christine of Brunswick-Wolfenbüttel-Bevern, the wife of Frederick the Great.

== Early life ==
Dorothea Eleonore Luise Albertine was born in 1720 as the second daughter of Georg Christoph, Count of Schlieben, Lord of Sanditten (1676-1748), who served as Prussian Minister of State, and his wife, Eleonore Lucia von Ilten (1686-1757).

== Biography ==
In 1742 Eleonore married Baron Dietrich Cesarion von Keyserling (1698-1745). In 1744 they had a daughter, Adelaide Friederike von Keyserling (1744-1818), who married firstly Johann Friedrich von Alvensleben (1736-1819) and after their divorce in 1771 married again to Freiherr Georg Ludwig von Edelsheim (d. 1814). Frederick II served as the godfather of their daughter. Eleonore was widowed shortly after the birth of her daughter. Frederick II allowed her to take up residence at Schönhausen Palace, where she was in charge of housekeeping and managing the daily routines of the estate. She would entertain the Prussian queen, Elisabeth Christine of Brunswick-Wolfenbüttel-Bevern, by playing music. She was painted by Antoine Pesne, the court painter of Prussia, while in service to the queen. The painting now hangs in Charlottenburg Palace.

Eleonore died on 15 February 1755 in Berlin.
