= Catherine Weinzaepflen =

French writer (born 1946)

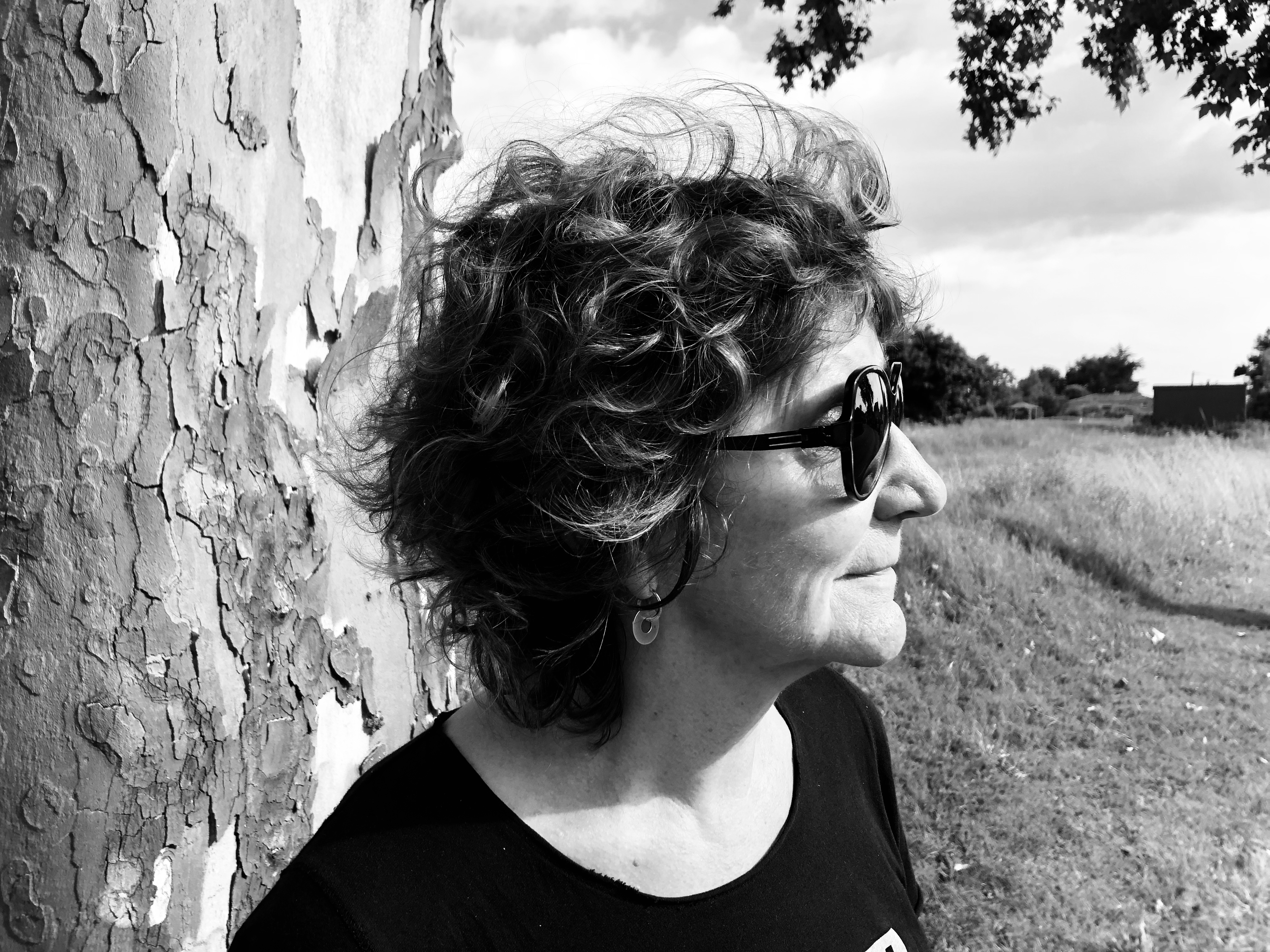
Catherine Weinzaepflen

Catherine Weinzaepflen (born 1 July 1946, Strasbourg) is a French writer

== Biography ==
Weinzaepflen spent her childhood in Alsace and the Central African Republic, studied literature in Strasbourg and lives in Paris since 1977. She made many trips to the Middle East (Turkey, Afghanistan, Iran, Pakistan) which, like Africa, permeate her books.

With Christiane Veschambre, she created and co-directs the literary magazine Land (1981-1984). In 1986, birth of his daughter Fanny whose father is the painter Michel Potage. From 1990 to 2000, she regularly stayed in Los Angeles, and from 2010 to 2014 in Sydney.

She is a member of the Reading Committee of Flammarion (1991-1993), then a member of the Commission Poésie of the Centre national du livre (2003–2006). She has created writing workshops that she continues to lead (École supérieure des Arts décoratifs de Strasbourg, 1996–2010 ); École spéciale d'architecture de Paris (since 2004). She regularly collaborates with the CCP (Cahier Critique de Poésie).

== Bibliography ==
Poetry

- 1976: L'Eau jaune, éditions Traboule
- 1977: Dans le texte, éditions La Main Bleue
- 1977: La Distance intime, éditions Coprah
- 1980: Cracher l'Afrique, Atelier de l'Agneau (Belgium)
- 1989: Les Maisons, Spectres familiers
- 2000: Les Mains dans le jaune absent, followed by York &, Le Scorff
- 2008: Le Temps du tableau, Editions Des femmes-Antoinette Fouque
- 2012: Ode à un kangourou, Editions de l'Attente
- 2013: Ô l'explosion des poppies, Editions de l'Attente
- 2015: avec Ingeborg, Editions Des femmes- Antoinette Fouque

Novels

- 1977: Isocelles, Des Femmes
- 1978: La Farnésine, jardins, Des Femmes
- 1983: Portrait et un rêve, Flammarion, (Prix France Culture)
- 1985: Am See, Flammarion; L'Atelier des Brisants; Des femmes-Antoinette Fouque, 2007 (radio drama for France Culture broadcast in 1979 under the title La Parole nomade)
- 1985: Totem, Flammarion, (selected for the prix Médicis)
- 1989: L'Ampleur du monde, Flammarion
- 1992: D'où êtes-vous ?, Flammarion
- 2002: Ismaëla, L'Atelier des Brisants
- 2003: Allée des Géants, L'Atelier des Brisants
- 2004: La Place de mon théâtre, Farrago
- 2006: Orpiment, Des Femmes–Antoinette Fouque
- 2012: Celle-là, Des femmes-Antoinette Fouque
- 2014: La Vie sauve, Des femmes-Antoinette Fouque

Theatre

- 1985: Danube jaune (commissioned by the Comédie-Française), mise-en-scène at Centre Pompidou

Texts

- 1975: « Entre ON et OFF », in Marguerite Duras, éditions Albatros
- 1980: « Fin de repas à China Cafe », in Manger, éditions Yellow Now
- various articles in the magazines Minuit, Traverses, Autrement (Paris mode d'emploi), Première Livraison, Anima, Land, Incendits (Belgium), Recueil, Jungle, Faire-Part, Murs murs, Temporali (Italy), If, Action poétique, etc.

Translations

- From English
  - A Moon for the Misbegotten by Eugene O'Neill, directed by Alain Françon at Festival d'Avignon and at Théâtre national de Chaillot, 1987
  - Le Filon by Tom Raworth, éditions CIPM/Spectres familiers, 1991
  - Poèmes by Elizabeth Bishop, If n° 22
  - Poèmes by Denise Levertov, Action poétique n° 173
- From German
  - Le Bonheur sur la colline by Margret Kreidl (collective translation), éditions Al Dante
  - Poèmes by Rose Ausländer, If n° 27
  - Poèmes by Christine Lavant and Ingeborg Bachmann, Action poétique n° 193 and If n° 32

Cinema

- Avenue of the Giants (script), adaptation of the novel Allée des Géants
- Chronique Cinéma & cinémas in the magazine Action poétique (2003–2005)

== Literary prizes ==
- 1983 : Prix France Culture for Portrait et un rêve
- 1985 : Bourse de la Fondation Cino Del Duca
- 2006 : Prix Brantôme for Orpiment

== Bibliography ==
- Catherine Weinzaepflen, in Nouveau dictionnaire de biographie alsacienne, vol. 39, p. 4143
- Catherine Weinzaepflen in Le Dictionnaire universel des Créatrices, vol. 3, p. 4564
