= Jacqueline Duhême =

French illustrator and writer (1927–2024)

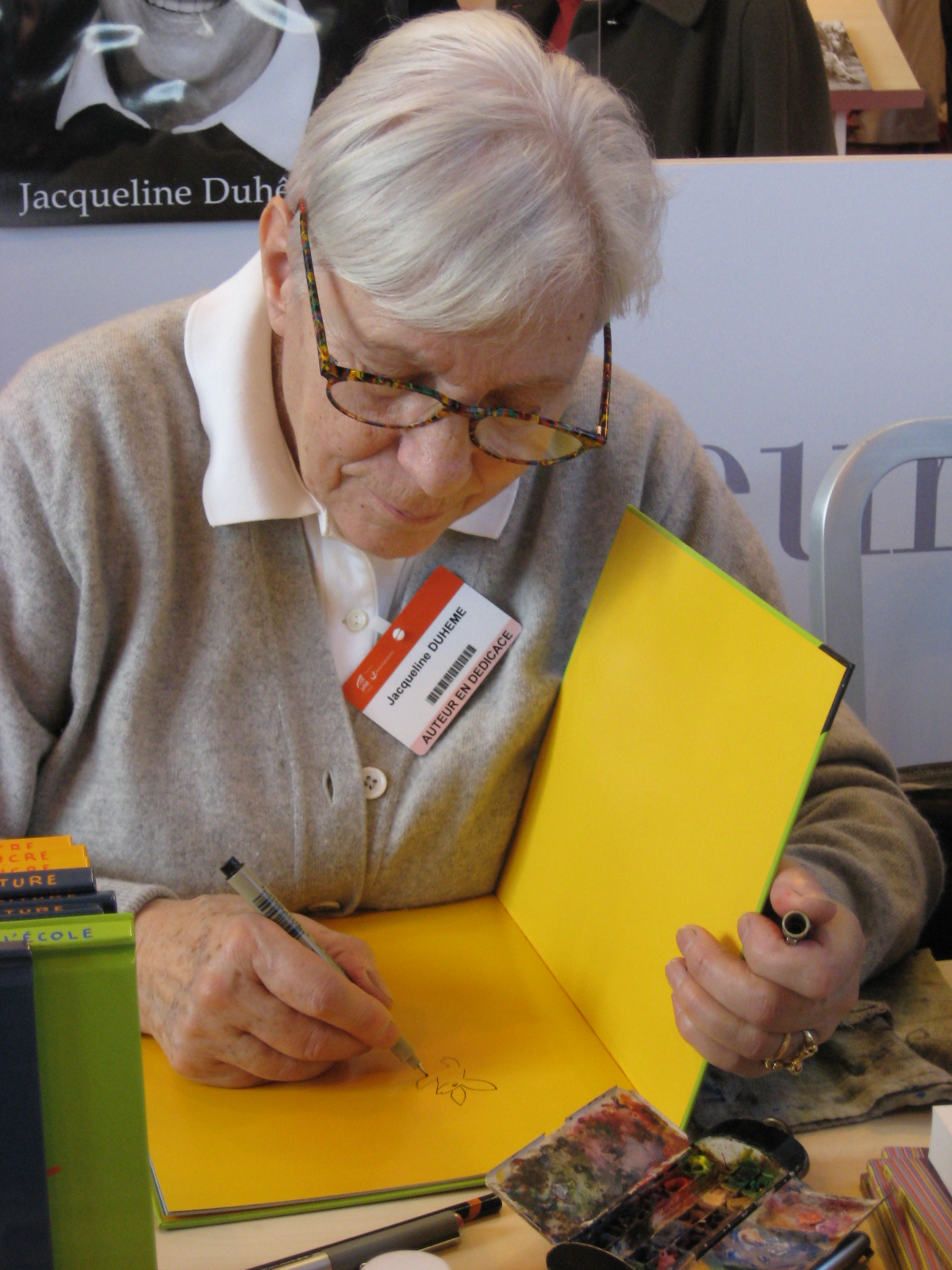
- Duhême in 2009
- Born: 15 November 1927; Versailles, France
- Died: 1 March 2024 (aged 96); Nogent-sur-Marne
- Occupations: Illustrator; Writer

Jacqueline Duhême (15 November 1927 – 1 March 2024) was a French illustrator and writer.

== Biography ==
Born in Versailles on 15 November 1927, Duhême was a student of Paul Colin and Henri Matisse in Vence. She drew illustrations for notable poets such as Paul Éluard, Jacques Prévert, Blaise Cendrars, and Claude Roy. She also did illustrations in the books Le Noël de Folette, Hadji, and Irma et Igor sur le France. She also covered the Kennedy family's trip to France, Charles de Gaulles's trip to South America, and Pope Paul VI's trip to the Holy Land.

In addition to her illustrating, Duhême created tapestries. She also wrote an autobiography in 2009 titled Petite main chez Matisse in which she recounted her time in Cimiez and her experiences with Louis Aragon, Colette, Pablo Picasso. In Une vie en crobards, she tells of her memories experiencing literary and artistic history in the 20th Century. She also covers her childhood in her mother's bookshop in Suresnes and her time in Greece during World War II.

Jacqueline Duhême died on 1 March 2024, at the age of 96.

== Publications ==
=== Autobiographies ===
- Line et les autres (1986)
- Jacqueline Kennedy et Jacqueline Duhême partent en voyage (1998)
- Petite Main chez Henri Matisse (2009)
- Une vie en crobards (2014)

=== Youth collections ===
- Les Belles images de Jacqueline Duhême (1983)
- Le Noël de Folette (1992)
- Hadji (1996)
- Louloute (2002)
- Irma et Igor sur le “France” (2003)

== Decorations ==
- Commander of the Ordre des Arts et des Lettres (2016)
