= Anton Legashov =

Russian painter

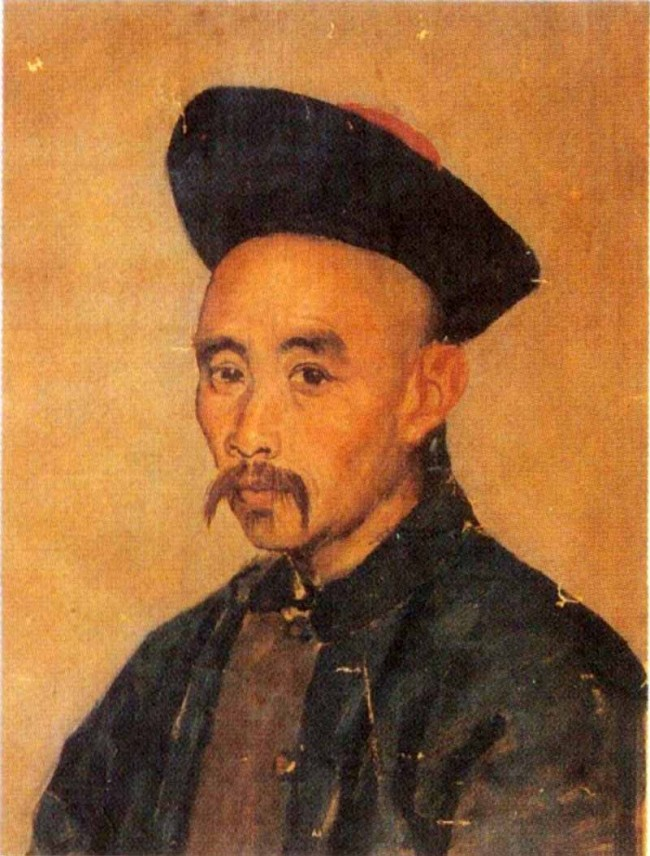
Portrait of an Elderly Chinese Man

Anton Mikhailovich Legashov, also Legashev or Legashyov (Russian: Антон Михайлович Легашов, or Легашёв; 1798 in Lipovka, Luninsky District – 1865 in Saint Petersburg) was a Russian landscape and portrait painter.

== Biography ==
He was born to family of serfs. At first, he studied music, then later switched to joinery. In 1818, he was given his freedom and, in 1820, went to Saint Petersburg, where he audited classes at the Imperial Academy of Arts. He first displayed special skills as a portrait painter when he studied with Alexander Varnek. His works were awarded a silver medal in 1824.

The following year, the Academy's steering committee was prepared to name him an "Artist", 14th-class, but the proposal was rejected by Tsar Nicholas I (a self-styled art connoisseur), who had seen his work and felt that it was premature to give him the title; suggesting that at least one more year of works be evaluated first.

In 1829, at the suggestion of the Academy's President, Legashov presented the Tsar with a portrait of Major General Alexander Khatov. It was, however, found unsatisfactory (the Tsar was especially displeased with the hands, apparently) and Legashov's application was once again rejected.

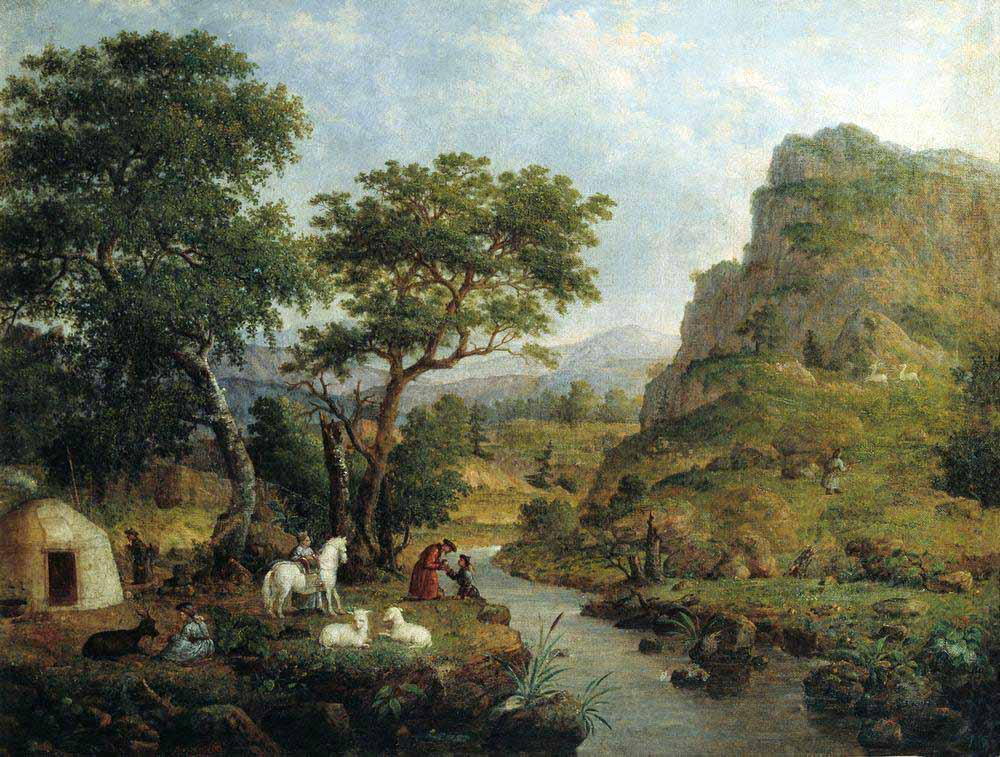
In the Mountains of China

At the end of that year, he finally received his title and joined the Eleventh Russian Spiritual Mission to Beijing (1830-1840) as the mission's official artist. After he had been there for several months, it is said that crowds were flocking to the Russian compound, demanding portraits. Based on a report by Legashov, he completed 26 historical scenes and 24 portraits of various Chinese dignitaries, now in Russia, as well as a number of religious scenes for use in Beijing. He also helped restore murals at the Church of the Dormition and was awarded the Order of Saint Stanislaus for his overall contributions to the mission.

Upon his return in 1841, he suggested that the Academy allow him to teach Chinese ink painting there, but his proposal was rejected on the grounds that it was considered inferior to European art and he was not knowledgeable enough to be an instructor. Instead, he became a drawing teacher at the Saint Petersburg State Institute of Technology; a position he held until 1852.

He continued to create paintings with Chinese motifs and themes; including landscapes, genre scenes and still-lifes. His works are in several museums in Moscow, as well as in Vladivostok and private collections.
