= Rabah Belamri =

Algerian writer

- رابح بلعمري
- Born: October 11 1946
- Died: September 28 1995; Paris, France
- Education: University of Algiers
- Occupations: Writer, poet

Rabah Belamri (Arabic: رابح بلعمري; 11 October 1946 – 28 September 1995) was an Algerian writer.

== Biography ==
Rabah Belamri lost his sight in 1962. After studying at Sétif High School, at the École des jeunes aveugles in Algiers, at the École normale d'instituteurs of Bouzareah and at the University of Algiers, he arrived in 1972 in Paris where he supported a doctorate entitled L'œuvre de Louis Bertrand, Miroir de l'idéologie coloniale which was published by the Office des publications universitaires in 1980.

He obtained French nationality.

He is the author of several collections of poems, tales and novels inspired by his Algerian childhood. He was touched by the work of Jean Sénac to whom he devoted an essay and who he considered a guide.

He died on September 28 1995 in Paris following a surgery.

== Citation ==
It is time to collect the treasures of our oral culture, threatened with disappearance by the tumult of television. Today, in Algeria, the vigils are organized around the small screen and the storytellers no longer have the time or no longer find the opportunity and the need to tell. (...) I tried, within the limits of my means, to save a fragment of our cultural heritage from oblivion. (...) These tales collected in dialectal Arabic, I had to translate them into French (...). There is no doubt that this language takes them out of their isolation and propels them into the sphere of the universal cultural heritage.

— Rabah Belamri, Veillées d'antan, in El Moudjahid, Algiers, 30 September 1982

== Judgements ==
For Rabah Belamri, the indefatigable questioner of the world, poetry is no doubt only a means that participates, with others, in a quest for clarity and plenitude. A need for light as a long refused water but also a denunciation of all that strikes everyday life and hope: the alienated or bargained woman, the sequestered happiness.

— Tahar Djaout, Les mots migrateurs : une anthologie poétique algérienne, Algiers, Office des publications universitaires, 1984

He has breath, force, violence in the warmth and tenderness that testify to another earth, another sun than ours, in short of another tradition.

— Georges-Emmanuel Clancier (back cover of Le galet et l'hirondelle, 1985)

His work spoke of the difficulty of being, of exile, of solitude. But it also spoke to us of tenderness, it carried us away in its impulse towards the humiliated, towards all those whom contemporary violence crushed, abandoned.

— JMG Le Clézio, in Le Monde, Paris, 13 October 1995

== Bibliography ==
=== Works ===
- 1980: L'œuvre de Louis Bertrand, miroir de l'idéologie colonialiste, Office des Publications Universitaires, Algiers
- 1982: Les Graines de la douleur, Algerian folk tales, Publisud, Paris, 110 p. ISBN 2866000285.
- 1982: La Rose rouge, Algerian folk tales, Publisud
- 1982: Le Soleil sous le tamis, autobiographical childhood story, preface by Jean Déjeux, Publisud, 316 p. ISBN 2866005716 BnF 34716965v.
- 1983: Chemin de brûlure, poems, drawings by Hamid Tibouchi, Éditions de l'Orycte, Paris
- 1986: L'Oiseau du grenadier, Algerian tales, proverbs and childhood memories, Castor poche, Flammarion, Paris
- 1985: Le Galet et l'hirondelle, poems, L'Harmattan, Paris, 108 p. BnF 348637157.
- 1986: Proverbes et dictons algériens, L'Harmattan
- 1987: Regard blessé, autobiographical novel, éditions Gallimard, Paris, Prix France Culture
- 1989: Jean Sénac: entre désir et douleur, essay, Office des Publications Universitaires
- 1989: L'Olivier boit son ombre, poems, cover and illustrations by Petar Omčikus, etching by Abdallah Benanteur, Edisud, Aix-en-Provence, 104 p. ISBN 2 85744 451 6.
- 1989: L'Asile de pierre, novel, Gallimard, 152 p.
- 1991: L'Âne de Djeha, L'Harmattan
- 1992: Femmes sans visage, novel, Gallimard, (Prix Kateb Yacine), 141 p.
- 1993: Pierres d'équilibre, poems, Le Dé bleu
- 1994: Mémoire en archipel, collection of tales, Gallimard, 133 p.
- 1996: Chronique du temps de l'innocence, Gallimard
- 1998: Corps seul, poems, Gallimard, 70 p.

=== Anthologies ===
- Les Mots migrateurs, Une anthologie poétique algérienne, présentée par Tahar Djaout, Office des Publications Universitaires, Alger, 1984.
- Anthologie de la littérature algérienne (1950-1987), Introduction, choices, notices and comments by Charles Bonn, Le Livre de Poche, Paris, 1990 ISBN 2-253-05309-0
- Des Chèvres noires dans un champ de neige ? 30 poètes et 4 peintres algériens, Bacchanales n°32, Saint-Martin-d'Hères, Maison de la poésie Rhône-Alpes - Paris, Marsa éditions, 2003; Des chèvres noires dans un champ de neige ? (Anthologie de la poésie algérienne contemporaine), édition enrichie, Bacchanales, n° 52, Saint-Martin-d'Hères, Maison de la poésie Rhône-Alpes, 2014
- Ali El Hadj Tahar, Encyclopédie de la poésie algérienne de langue française, 1930-2008 (in two volumes), Algiers, Éditions Dalimen, 2009, 956 pages. ISBN 978-9961-759-79-0
- Abdelmadjid Kaouah, Quand la nuit se brise (Poésie algérienne francophone contemporaine), éditions du Seuil, Paris, 2012.
- Une anthologie des poésies arabes, images by Rachid Koraïchi, (poems chosen by Farouk Mardam-Bey et Waciny Laredj, calligraphies d'Abdallah Akkar et Ghani Alani), Paris, Éditions Thierry Magnier, 2014 [poème: Les fenêtres sont vides...] ISBN 978-2-36474-536-0

== On Rabah Belamri ==
- Christiane Chaulet Achour, « Belamri, Rabah », with the collaboration of Corinne Blanchaud (dir.), Dictionnaire des écrivains francophones classiques : Afrique subsaharienne, Caraïbe, Maghreb, Machrek, Océan Indien, H. Champion, Paris, 2010, p. 48–51 ISBN 978-2-7453-2126-8
- Jean Déjeux, Dictionnaire des auteurs maghrébins de langue française, Paris, Editions Karthala, 1984 ISBN 2-86537-085-2.

== See also ==
- Algerian literature
