= Jean-Baptiste Corneille =

French painter, etcher, and engraver (1649–1695)

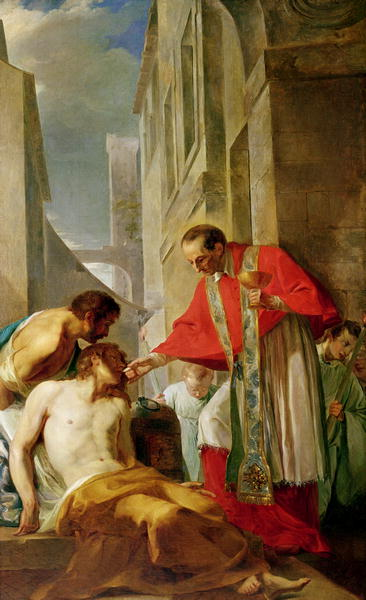
Jean-Baptiste Corneille, Charles Boromée caring for the Plague Victims (17th century)

Jean-Baptiste Corneille (French pronunciation: [ʒɑ̃ batist kɔʁnɛj]; 2 December 1649 – 12 April 1695) was a French painter, etcher, and engraver.

== Biography ==
Corneille was born in Paris between 1646 and 1649. He was the youngest son of Michel Corneille the Elder of Orléans, and brother of the younger Michel. He is known as "the younger Corneille". His devoted father was his teacher and painstakingly prepared the youth for his future successes as an historical painter. In 1664 he won the second prize and in 1668 the first prize of the academy. He then went to study in Rome and, on his return in 1675 was received into the Royal Academy, painting for his reception-picture the Punishment of Busiris by Hercules, now one of the notable canvases in the Louvre. He painted in some of the Paris churches and in 1679 finished his Deliverance of St. Peter from Prison for the Cathedral of Notre-Dame. With Jacques Vouet he was employed on the decorations of the Tuileries. In 1692 he was appointed professor in the academy. He died in Paris on 12 April 1695.

== Work ==
His style, like his brother's, was that of the school of the Desiderosi, but Jean was somewhat inferior to the younger Michel in composition and drawing. Many of the paintings of this excellent artist were engraved by contemporaries, a few by the great Mariette, and Jean himself engraved and etched plates after his own designs and finished pictures, and after the Carracci. His work with acid and the burin was spirited and exhibited his thorough mastery of technic. He commenced and finished his plates after the manner of Agostino Carracci. His most important plates were: "Bust of Michelangelo", "St. Bernard", "Mercury in the Air", and "St. John in the Wilderness" (after Annibale Carracci).
