= Schlieben (surname) =

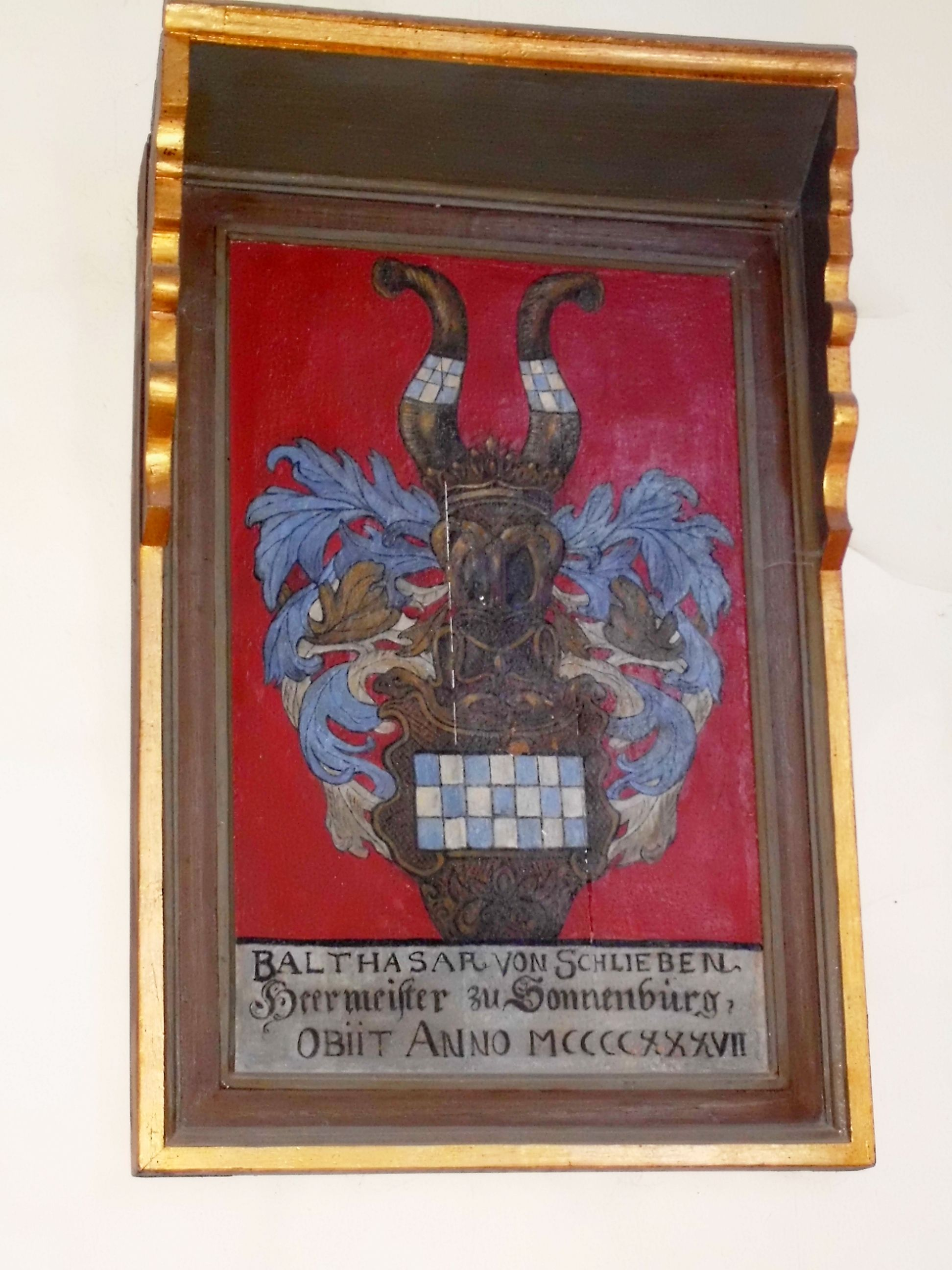
Coat of arms of Schlieben family

Schlieben is the name of an old German noble family, that can trace its ancestry back to 1144 in Niederlausitz. They held the title of Count in Prussia and were also part of the nobility of Saxony.

== Notable members ==
- Eleonore von Schlieben (1720–1755), German noblewoman and a lady in waiting to Queen Elisabeth Christine of Prussia
- Karl-Wilhelm von Schlieben (1894–1964), German general in the Wehrmacht during World War II
