= Antoine Pesne =

French-Prussian painter (1683–1757)

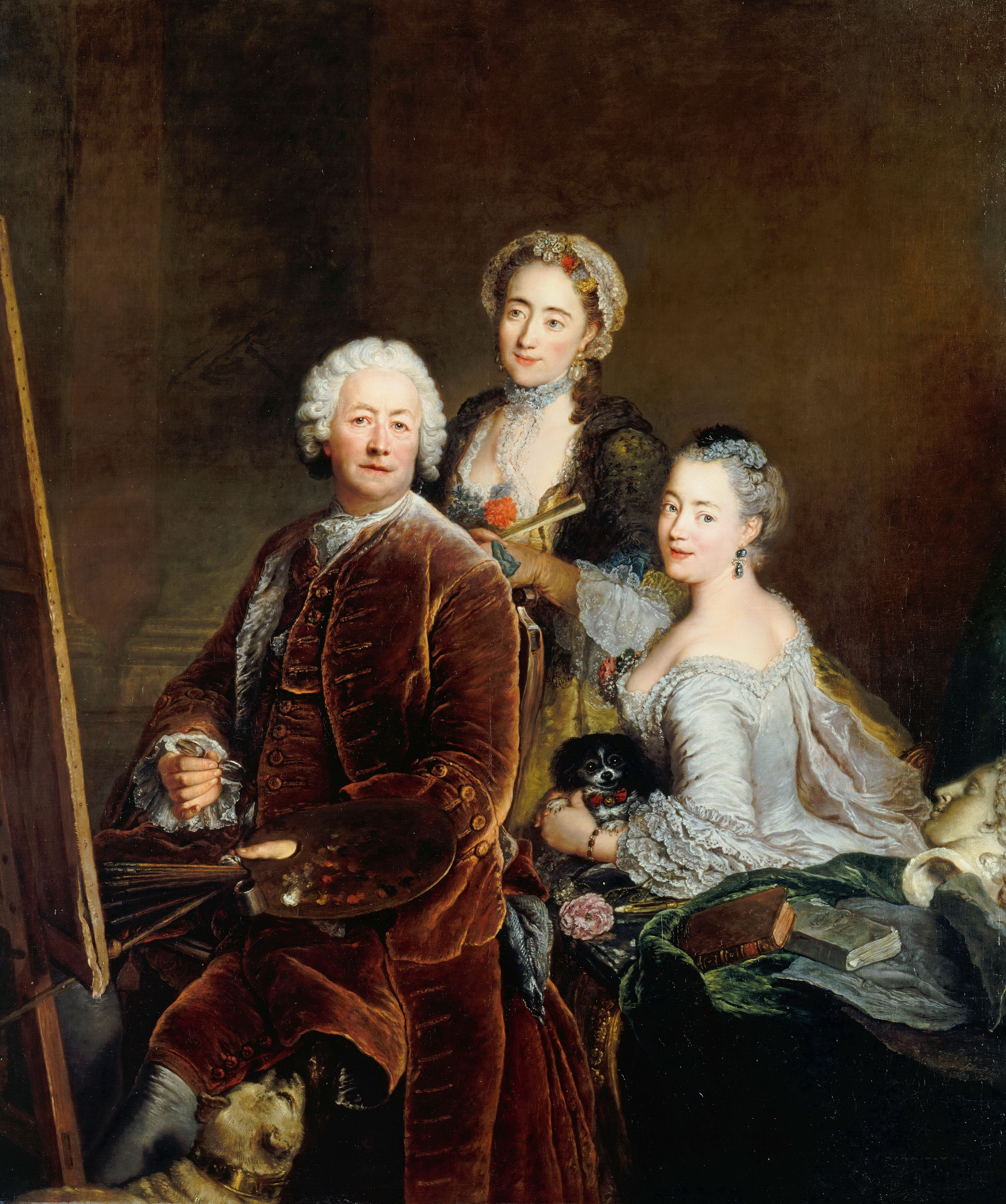
Portrait of the Painter with His Daughters (1754), Gemäldegalerie Berlin

Antoine Pesne (French pronunciation: [pɛːn]) (29 May 1683 – 5 August 1757) was a French-born court painter of Prussia. Starting in the manner of baroque, he became one of the fathers of rococo in painting. His work represents a link between the French school and the Frederican rococo style.

== Early life ==
Born in Paris, Pesne first studied art under his father and uncle. From 1704 to 1710 he received a stipend for advanced training at the Académie Royale in Italy.

== Career ==
In 1710, Pesne was called to Berlin by King Frederick I in Prussia. The king had seen and liked a painting of a German nobleman Pesne had completed in Venice and wanted Pesne to complete a study of himself. Upon the death of the king in 1713, Pesne worked in the courts of Dresden and Dessau, and later visited London and Paris, where he was made a full member of the Académie Royale in 1720. While there, he painted the a portrait of a well-known collector Pierre-Jean Mariette in 1723. Mariette had extensive international connections with other artists and, importantly, with patrons.

In 1734, Frederick the Great, having been reinstated as crown prince in 1731 by his father, Frederick William I, took up residence in Rheinsberg. Frederick William himself had little use for painting and art for its own sake; he was far more interested in soldiers, soldiering, and building the army. He did, however, appoint Pesne as director of the Prussian Academy of Arts in 1732. At that point, Pesne became famous for his portraits of the Prussian royal family and their households. Among his most famous is his portrait of Frederick William, The Soldier King, (1733). Many of his portraits hang in Berlin museums and in Charlottenburg Palace. These include (among others) his portraits of the first two kings in Prussia, Frederick I and Frederick William I, members of the royal family, and of lady-in-waiting Eleonore von Schlieben.

In St. Agnus Church in Köthen, where J. S. Bach was music director (Kapellmeister), there is a portrait of the donor Gisela Agnes, Princess of Anhalt-Köthen, painted by Pesne in 1713. The ceiling paintings in Charlottenburg, Rheinsberg, and Sanssouci Palaces are at least partially his work.

In 1746 Pesne received from King Frederick II property and construction material to erect a house at Oberwallstraße 3 in Berlin, where he lived until his death in 1757. His grave is preserved in the Protestant Friedhof I der Jerusalems- und Neuen Kirchengemeinde (Cemetery No. I of the congregations of Jerusalem's Church and New Church) in Berlin-Kreuzberg, south of Hallesches Tor.

== Style and influence ==
Pesne used a style similar to that made famous in France during the reign of Louis XIV, although his use of colors was softer and his touch more "painterly." His View of Rheinsberg (1737) demonstrates the engagement of people with nature, a theme popular at the time. Most of his decorative work at Rheinsberg and later in Berlin and Potsdam at Sanssoucci, included mythological and allegorical scenes, such as the ceiling in the audience room at Sanssouci: Zephyr Crowns Flora. The presence of such artists as Pesne throughout the capitals of Europe guaranteed the expansion of French influence into all the arts.

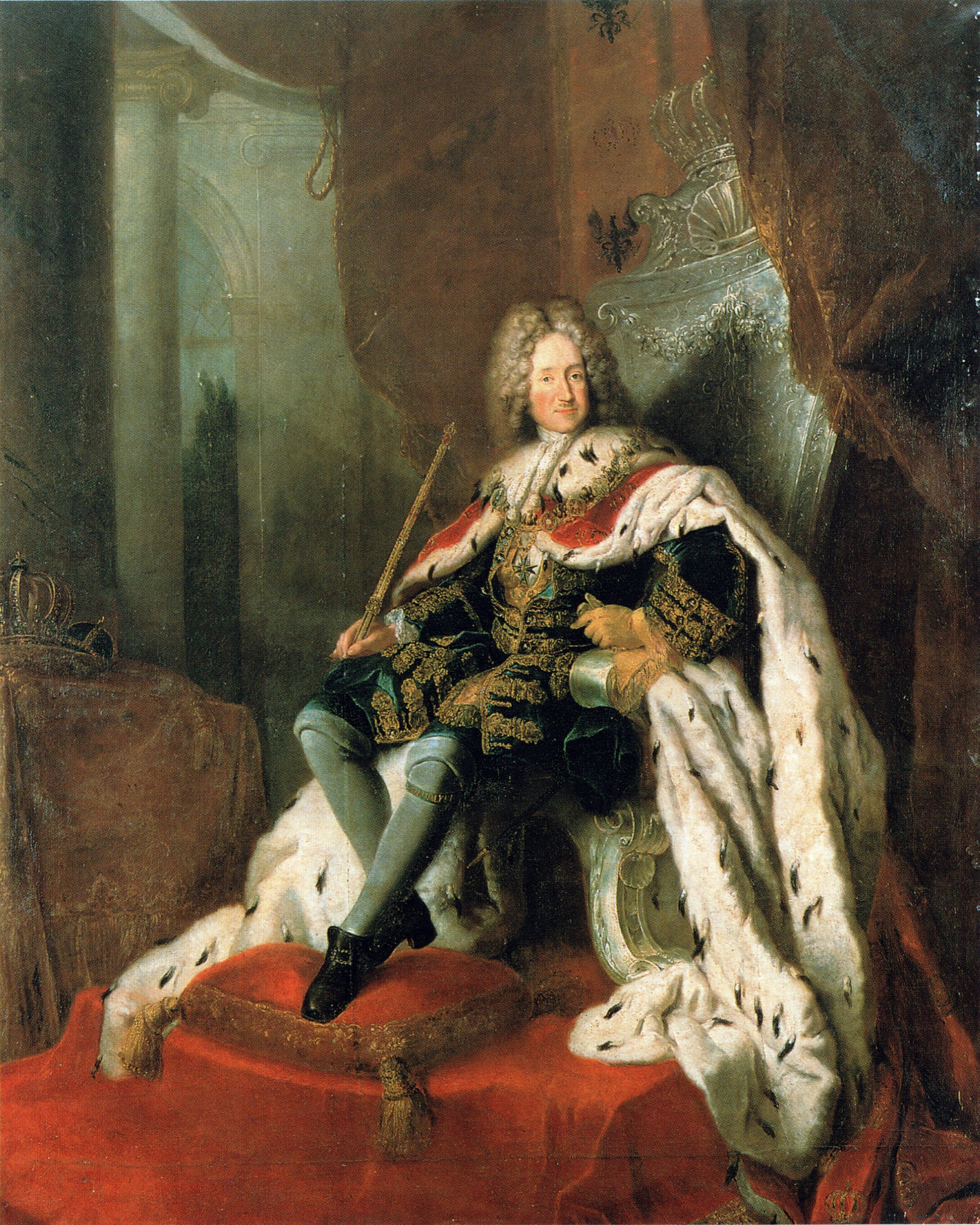
Frederick I, first king in Prussia (before 1713)

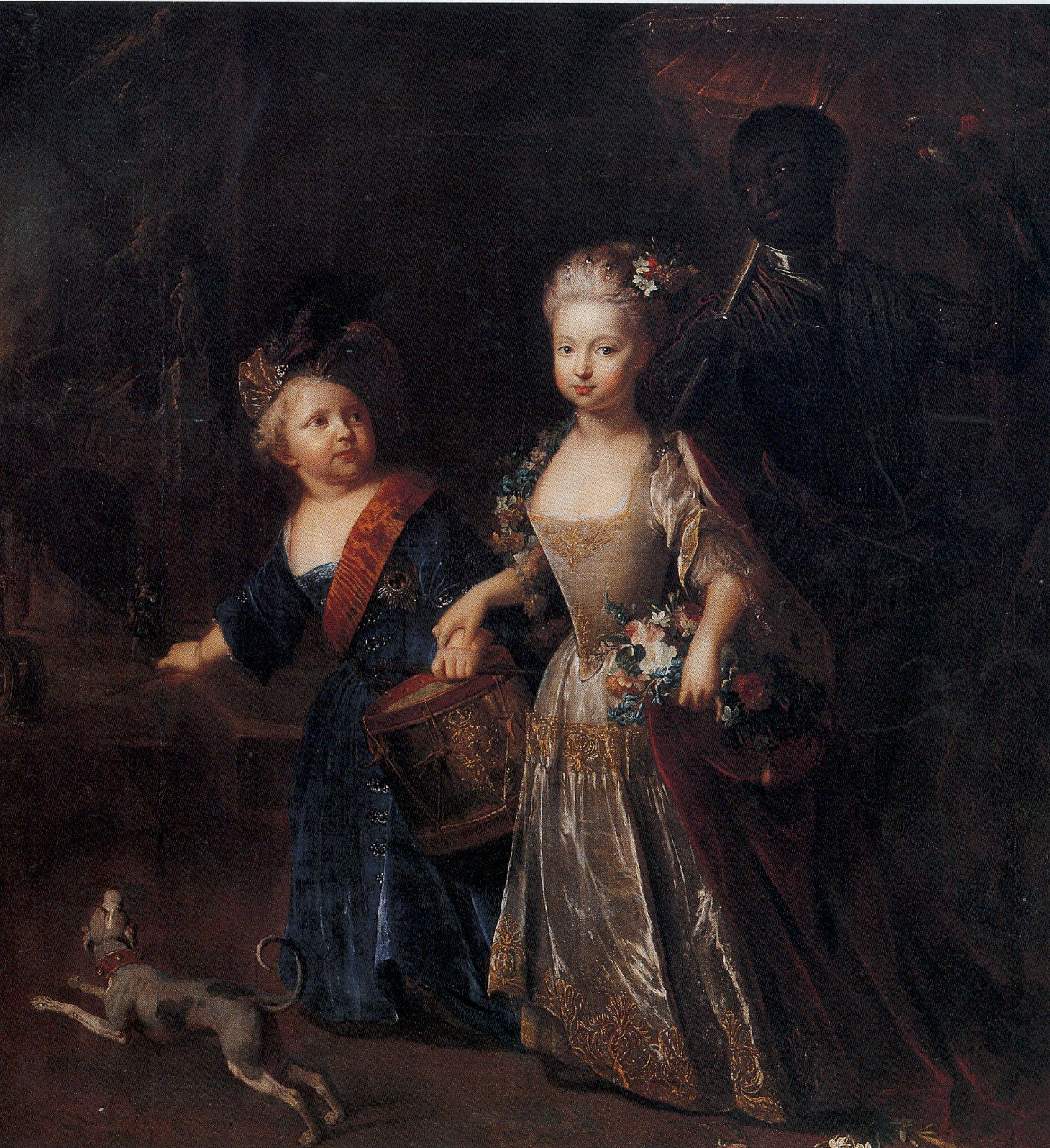
Frederick with his sister, Wilhelmine, as children (c. 1715)

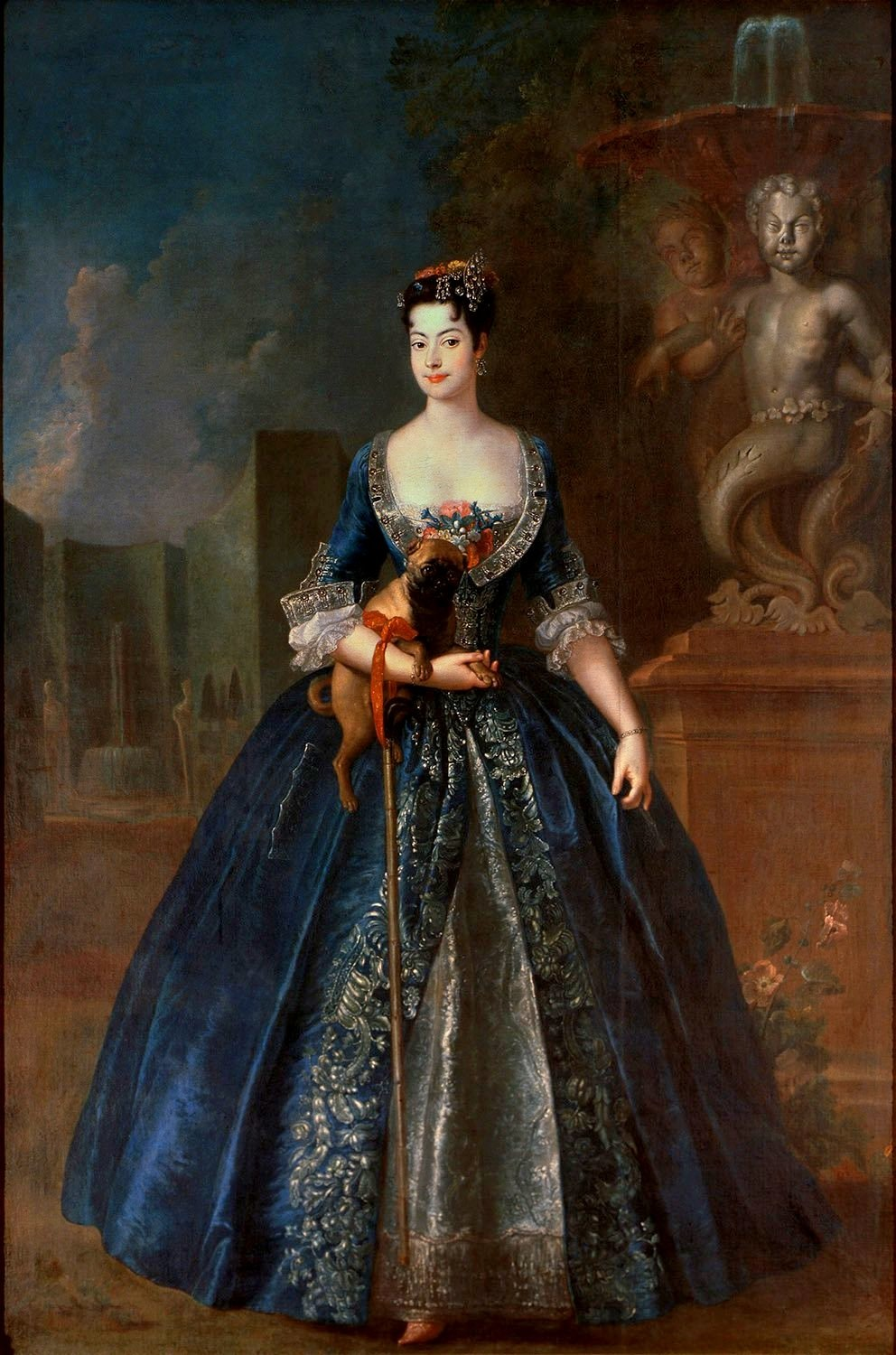
Portrait of Anna Orzelska with a Pug (c. 1728), National Museum, Warsaw

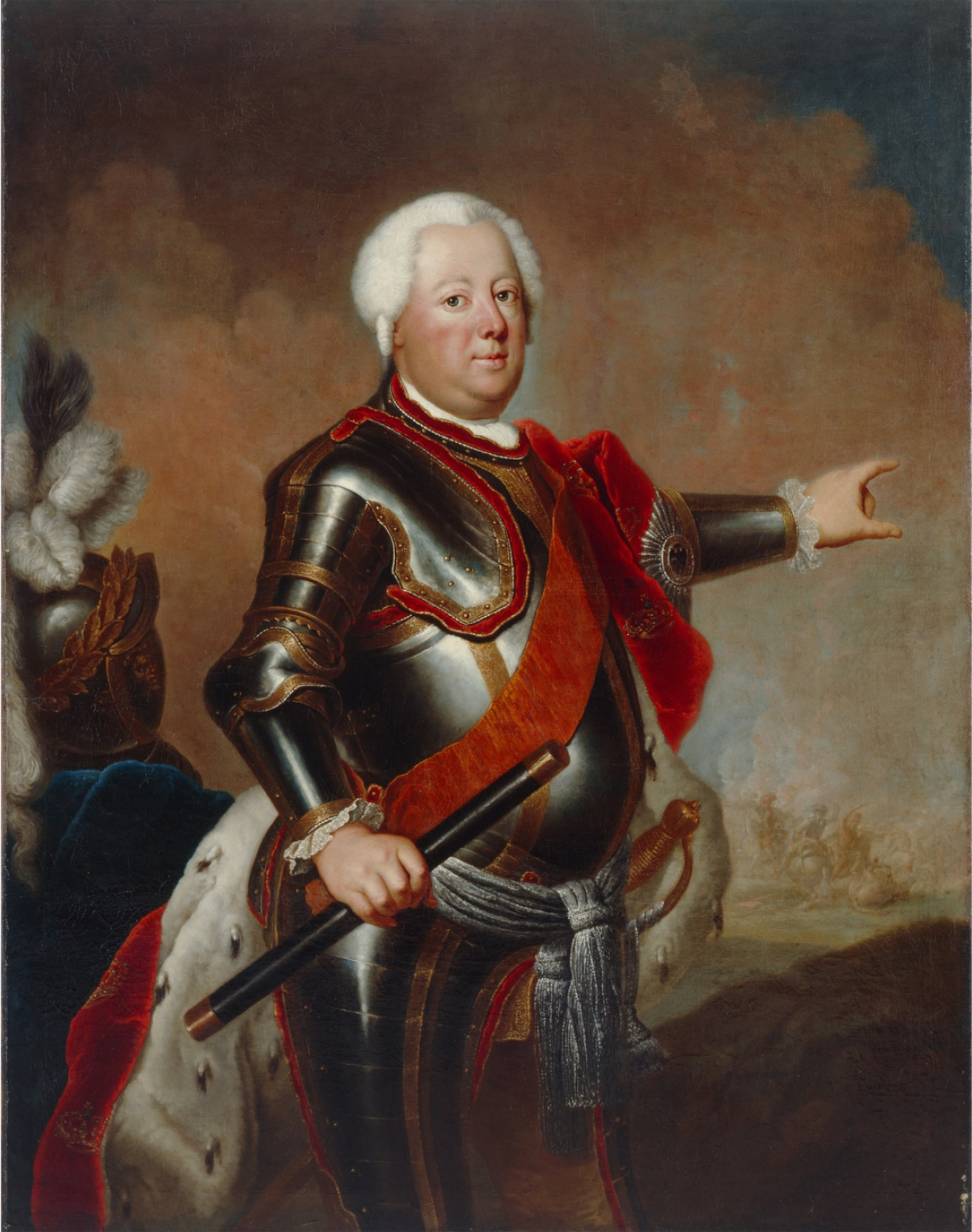
Frederick Wilhelm I, the "Soldier King" (c. 1733)

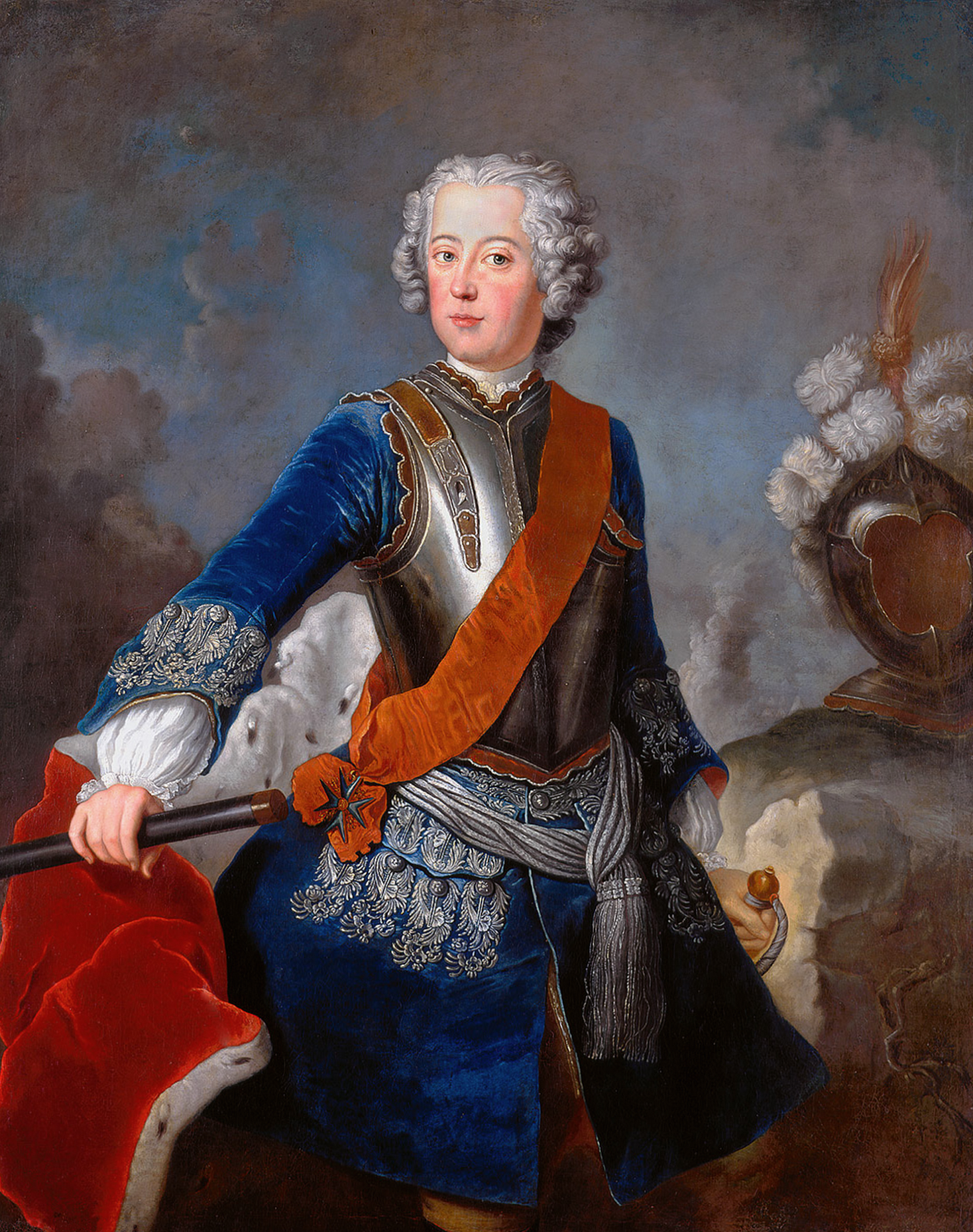
Fredrick II, later "the Great", as crown prince (c. 1736)

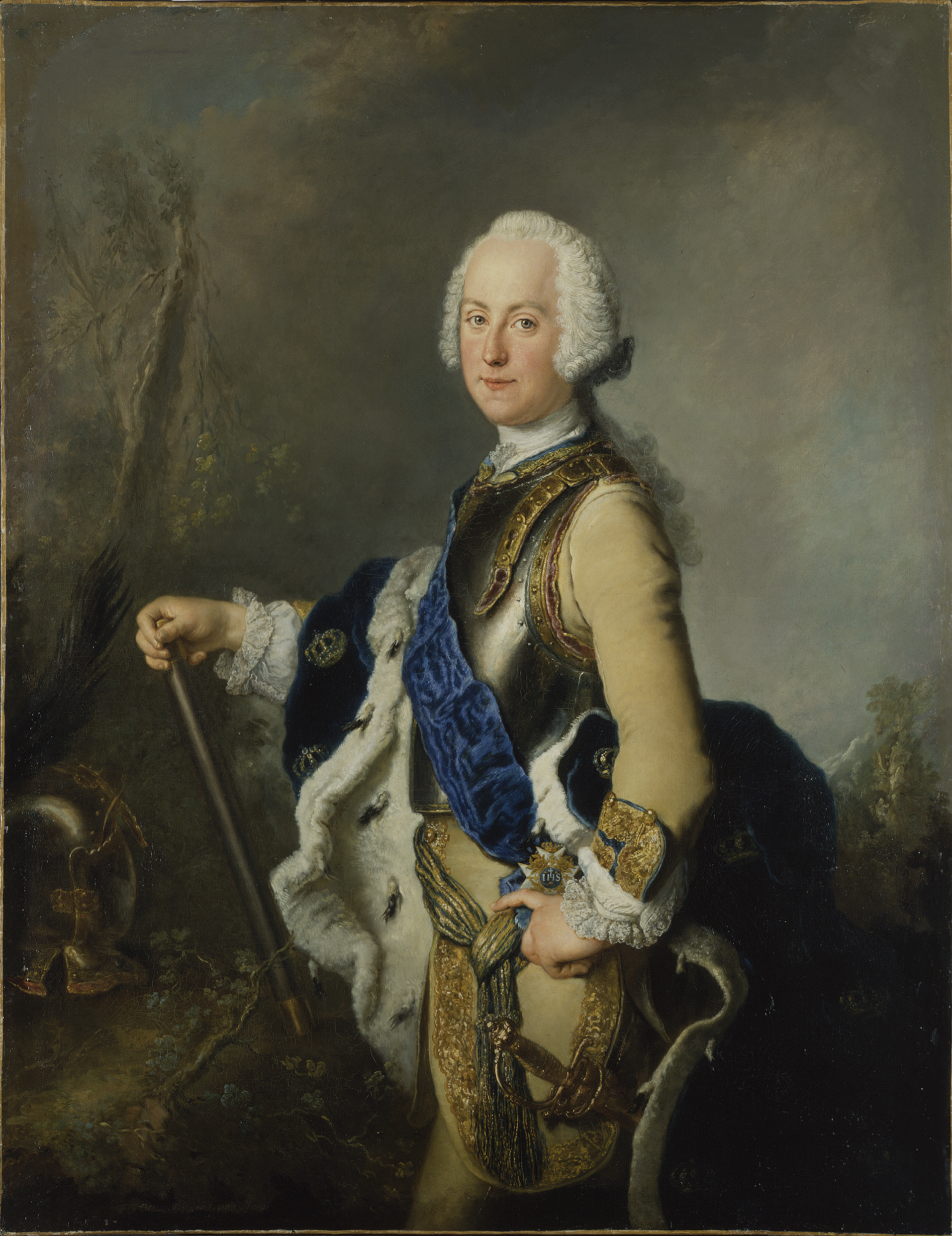
Adolf Frederick as crown prince of Sweden, in the uniform of the royal Swedish Garde du Corps (c. 1743)

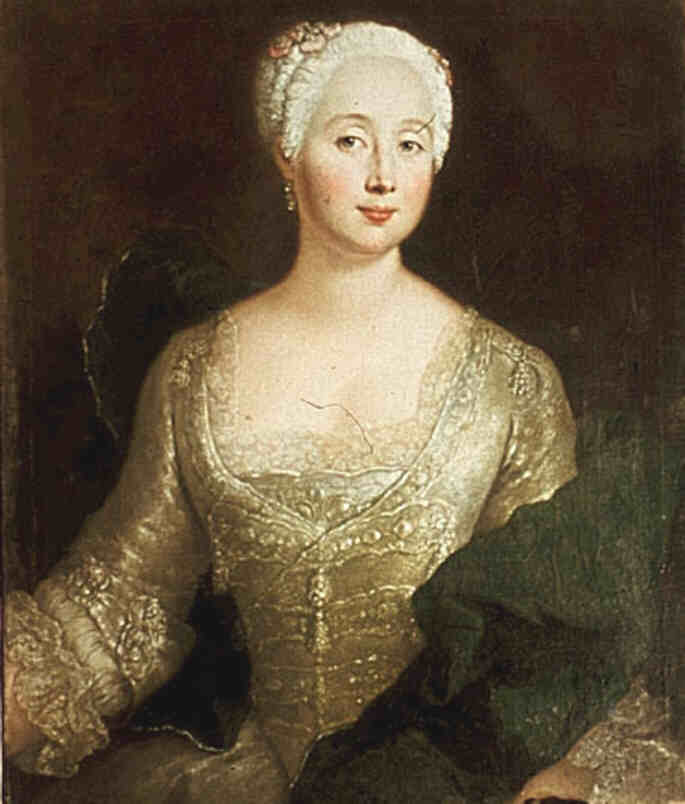
Louise Eleonore von Wreech née. von Schöning (c. 1737), Hermitage Museum (Bayreuth)

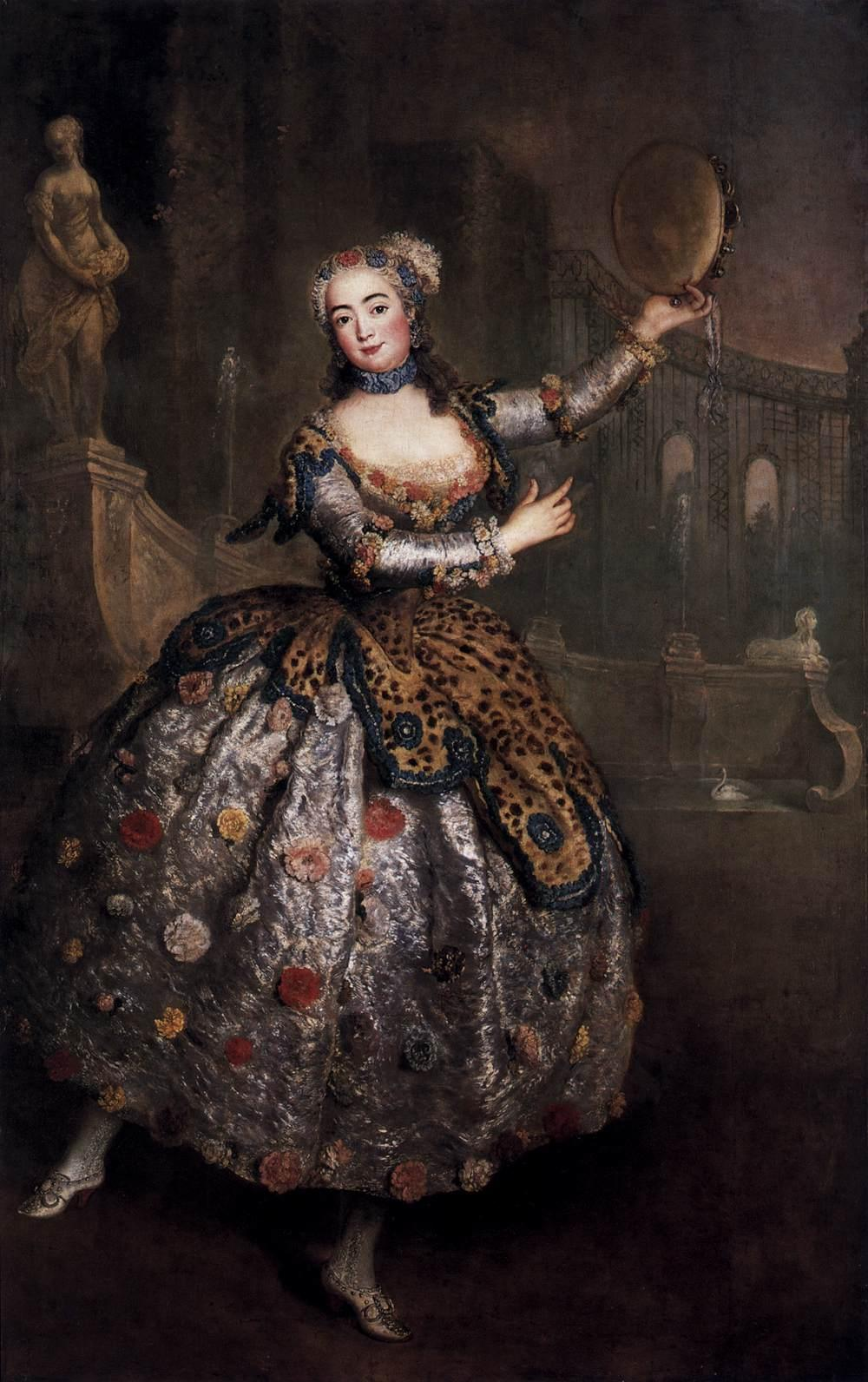
Portrait of the dancer Barbara Campanini aka "La Barbarina" (c. 1745) employs principles of contrast and complement in pose and setting. This hung originally behind Frederick's desk.
