= Prix France Culture =

The Prix France Culture is a former literary award created in 1979 by the radio station France Culture.

In 2006, it was renamed Prix France Culture/Télérama, and its name was used from 2007 replacing the "Prix Arlequin", cinematographic prize awarded in parallel to the Grand prix du meilleur scénariste.

== History ==
The prize was created in 1979 to reward important authors whose work was still unknown to the general public. It was awarded in early spring, on the occasion of the Salon Livre Paris. This prize was not endowed financially but the book was promoted on the radio. In 2006, the radio joined the cultural weekly Télérama and transformed the prize into Prix France Culture/Télérama awarded under the same conditions.

In 2006, the prize is replaced by the Prix France Culture/Télérama.

== List of laureates ==
Year	Author	Book	Publisher (x^{e} fois)	Notes
1979	Roger Laporte	Souvenirs de Reims	Hachette, coll. « POL »	
1980	Claude Ollier	Marrakch Medine	Flammarion	
1981	Gilbert Lascault	Boucles et Nœuds et La Destinée de Jean Simon Castor	Balland et Christian Bourgois éditeur	
1982	Patrick Reumaux	Jeanne aux chiens	éditions Gallimard	
1983	Catherine Weinzaepflen	Portrait et un rêve	Flammarion	
1984	Jean Tortel et Pierre Michon	Feuilles tombées d'un discours et Vies minuscules	Ryôan-ji et éditions Gallimard	
1985	Emmanuel Hocquard	Aerea dans les forêts de Manhattan	Éditions P.O.L	
1986	Jacques Roubaud	Quelque chose noir	éditions Gallimard	
1987	Rabah Belamri	Regard blessé	éditions Gallimard	
1988	Bernard Noël	Journal du regard	Éditions P.O.L	
1989	Gérard Macé	Le Dernier des Égyptiens	Gallimard	
1990	Claude Roy	L'Étonnement du voyageur et l'ensemble de son œuvre	éditions Gallimard	
1991	Claude Esteban	Soleil dans une pièce vide	Flammarion	
1992	Jean-Christophe Bailly	Description d'Olonne	Christian Bourgois éditeur	
1993	Paule Thévenin	Antonin Artaud, ce désespéré qui vous parle	Éditions du Seuil	
1994	Jean-Loup Trassard	L'Espace antérieur	éditions Gallimard	
1995	Pierre Bergounioux	Miette	éditions Gallimard	
1996	Claude Lucas	Suerte	Éditions Plon	
1997	Jean-Pierre Milovanoff	La Splendeur d'Antonia	Éditions Juillard	
1998	Pascal Quignard	Vie secrète	éditions Gallimard	
1999	Jean-Louis Schefer	Figures peintes	Éditions P.O.L	
2000	Christian Gailly	Nuage rouge	éditions de minuit	
2001	Jean Hatzfeld	Dans le nu de la vie	Éditions du Seuil	
2002	Dominique Rolin	Le Futur immédiat	éditions Gallimard	
2003	Olivier Rolin	Tigre en papier	Éditions du Seuil	
2004	Georges-Arthur Goldschmidt	Le Poing dans la bouche	éditions Verdier	
2005	Christine Angot	Les Désaxés et Une partie du cœur	éditions Stock	
