= Lunino =

Set index of articles associated with the same name

Lunino (Russian: Лунино) is the name of several inhabited localities in Russia.

Urban localities

- Lunino, Penza Oblast, a work settlement in Luninsky District of Penza Oblast

Rural localities

- Lunino, Baltiysky District, Kaliningrad Oblast, a settlement under the administrative jurisdiction of the town of district significance of Baltiysk in Baltiysky District of Kaliningrad Oblast
- Lunino, Gvardeysky District, Kaliningrad Oblast, a settlement in Zorinsky Rural Okrug of Gvardeysky District of Kaliningrad Oblast
- Lunino, Nemansky District, Kaliningrad Oblast, a settlement in Luninsky Rural Okrug of Nemansky District of Kaliningrad Oblast
- Lunino, Kursk Oblast, a village in Uslansky Selsoviet of Oboyansky District of Kursk Oblast
- Lunino, Nizhny Novgorod Oblast, a village in Lindovsky Selsoviet of the town of oblast significance of Bor in Nizhny Novgorod Oblast
- Lunino, Novgorod Oblast, a village under the administrative jurisdiction of the urban-type settlement of Uglovka in Okulovsky District of Novgorod Oblast
- Lunino, Pskov Oblast, a village in Novorzhevsky District of Pskov Oblast
- Lunino, Ryazan Oblast, a selo in Pustopolsky Rural Okrug of Shilovsky District of Ryazan Oblast
- Lunino, Saratov Oblast, a selo in Turkovsky District of Saratov Oblast
- Lunino, Smolensk Oblast, a village in Maleyevskoye Rural Settlement of Krasninsky District of Smolensk Oblast
- Lunino, Chernsky District, Tula Oblast, a village in Bachurinskaya Rural Administration of Chernsky District of Tula Oblast
- Lunino, Plavsky District, Tula Oblast, a village in Yusupovsky Rural Okrug of Plavsky District of Tula Oblast
- Lunino, Vologda Oblast, a village in Velikoselsky Selsoviet of Kaduysky District of Vologda Oblast
- Lunino, Yaroslavl Oblast, a village in Ponomarevsky Rural Okrug of Pereslavsky District of Yaroslavl Oblast
