= Jean-Louis Schefer =

French writer (1938–2022)

Jean Louis Schefer (7 December 1938 – 7 June 2022) was a French writer, philosopher, art critic, and theoretician of cinema and image.

== Career ==
Born in Paris, France, a graduate of the École des Hautes Études en Sciences Sociales on Les écritures figuratives, a problème de grammaire égyptienne (under the guidance of Roland Barthes and Algirdas Julien Greimas), Schefer worked in Milan from 1965 to 1966, in the preparation of a dictionary, then in Venice from 1967 to 1968. In Italy he presented works of Gianfranco Pardi, Titina Maselli, Emilio Tadini, Gianni Colombo and others. From 1970 to 1981 he taught in Paris.

He collaborated with the magazines Tel Quel, Communications, Information sur les sciences sociales, Littérature, Critique, and Cahiers du Cinéma.

== Bibliography ==
- 1969: Scénographie d’un tableau, Éditions du Seuil, Tel Quel
- 1975: L’Invention du corps chrétien, Éditions Galilée
- 1980: L’Homme ordinaire du cinéma, Cahiers du cinéma/Éditions Gallimard
- 1985: Origine du crime, Café-Climat
- 1987: Gilles Aillaud, Éditions Hazan
- 1988: Jean-Claude Gallotta, groupe Émile Dubois, in collaboration with Laurence Louppe and Claude-Henri Buffard, éditions Dis Voir, ISBN 2906571067.
- 1989: 8, rue Juiverie, photographs by Jacqueline Salmon, CompAct
- 1992: De la peinture - De Pictura (1435) by Leon Battista Alberti, preface, translation from Latin and notes by Jean-Louis Schefer, Macula Dédale
- 1995: La Lumière et la Table, Maeght éditeur
- 1995: Question de style, L’Harmattan
- 1995: The Enigmatic Body, Cambridge University Press
- 1997: Du monde et du mouvement des images, Cahiers du cinéma
- 1998: Main courante, Éditions P.O.L
- 1998: Figures peintes, P.O.L, (Prix France Culture, 1999)
- 1998: Cinématographies, P.O.L
- 1998: Choses écrites, P.O.L
- 1998: Goya, la dernière hypothèse, Maeght éditeur
- 1999: Main courante 2, P.O.L
- 1999: Lumière du Corrège, P.O.L
- 1999: Questions d'art paléolithique, P.O.L
- 1999: Paolo Ucello, le Déluge, P.O.L
- 1999: Sommeil du Greco, P.O.L
- 1999: Images mobiles, P.O.L
- 2001: Main courante 3, P.O.L
- 2002: Polyxène et la vierge à la robe rouge, P.O.L
- 2002: Chardin, P.O.L
- 2004: Une maison de peinture, ed. Enigmatic
- 2005: Figures de différents caractères, P.O.L
- 2007: L’Hostie profanée - histoire d’une fiction théologique, P.O.L, ISBN 978-2-84682-208-4
- 2009: La Cause des portraits, P.O.L
- 2010: De quel tremblement de terre..., P.O.L
- 2011: Le Temps dont je suis l'hypothèse, P.O.L
- 2013: Monsieur Teste à l'école, P.O.L
- 2016: Squelettes et autres fantaisies, P.O.L
