= Laurence Louppe =

Laurence Louppe (1938 – 5 February 2012) was a French writer, critic and historian of dance, a specialist in the aesthetics of dance and visual arts and a choreographic artist.

== Biography ==
Laurence Louppe taught at the université du Québec à Montréal, at the Performing Arts Research and Training Studios in Brussels, and created a higher education in choreographic culture at the Cefedem-Sud in Aubagne. She was made a Chevalier of the Ordre des Arts et des Lettres 1 January 2009.

== Some publications and collaborations ==
- 1988: Jean-Claude Gallotta, groupe Émile Dubois, in collaboration with Jean-Louis Schefer and Claude-Henri Buffard, éditions Dis Voir, ISBN 2906571067
- 1991: La Matière et la Forme
- 1991 Danses tracées : dessins et notation des chorégraphes, exhibition catalog
- 1993: Richard Deacon, Hervé Robbe, Noisiel, La Ferme du buisson; Londres, British council
- 1997: Poétique de la danse contemporaine, coll. « La pensée du Mouvement », éditions Contredanse, Brussels ISBN 2-930146-02-8.
- 2000: L'Histoire de la danse. Repères dans le cadre du diplôme d'État
- 2007: Poétique de la danse contemporaine, la suite, éditions Contredanse, Brussels ISBN 2-930146-27-3.
