= Mariette (yacht) =

1915 two-masted schooner yacht

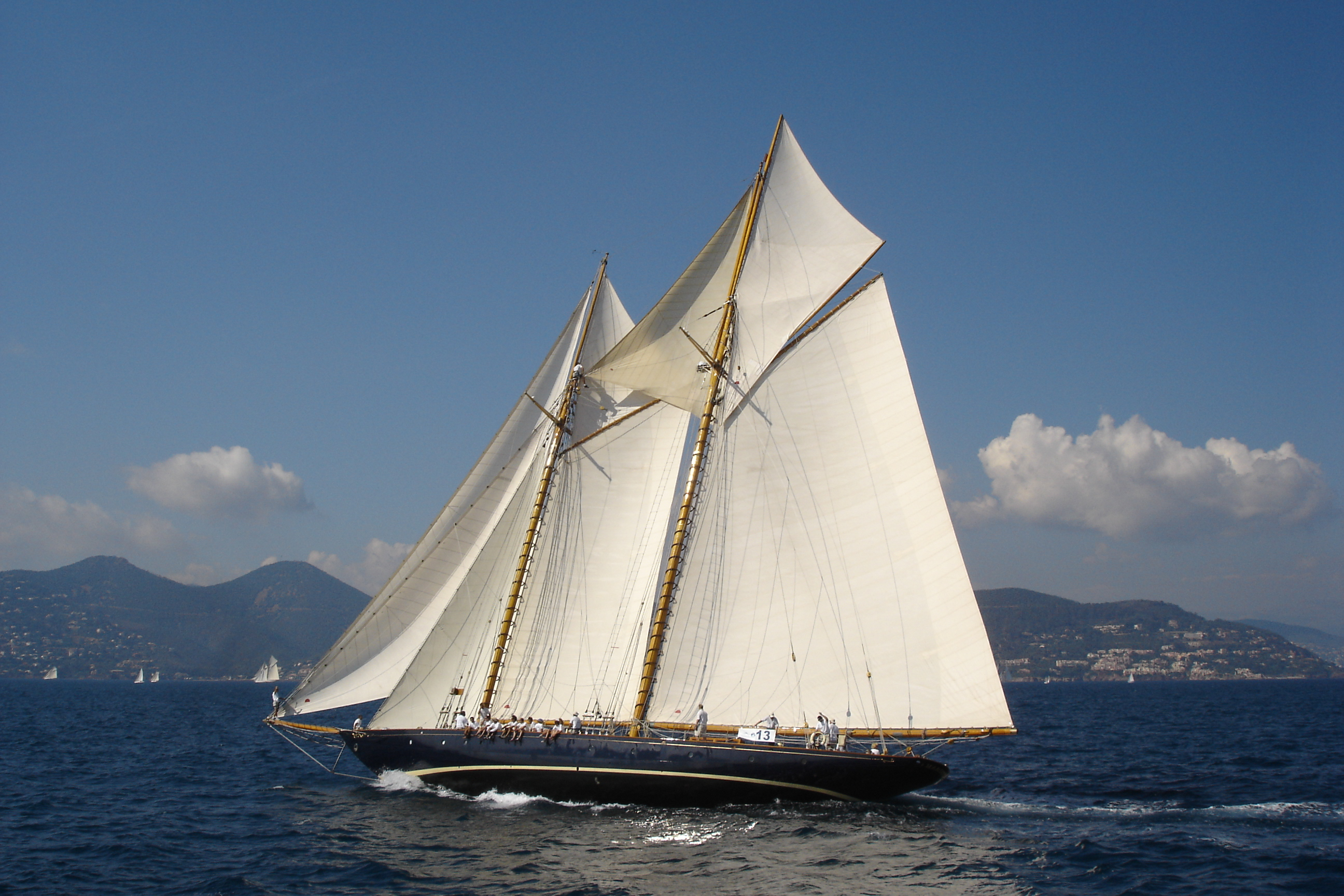
- Mariette

History

France
- Name: Mariette; Kebyar; Janeen; Gee Gee IV; Cleopatras Barge II; Le Voyageur; Guinevere; Evening Star; Mariette
- Builder: Herreshoff, Bristol
- Launched: 1916
- Status: In service

General characteristics
- Displacement: 165 tonnes
- Length: 33.50 m (total); 24.30 m (hul)
- Beam: 7.20 m
- Draught: 4.20 m
- Propulsion: 786/1033 m² of sail; 2 Caterpillar engines (180 shp)
- Boats & landing craft carried: sailing cutter; gasoline launch; dingy
- Capacity: 8 passengers

Mariette is a classic two-masted gaff schooner, designed and built by Nathanael Greene Herreshoff in 1915 for Harold S. Vanderbilt. She now sails out of Antibes, France, under the French flag.

== Design ==
Mariette was built as "Project 698" by Nathanael Herreshoff, at his Bristol, Rhode Island yard, for prominent yachtsman Harold S. Vanderbilt. She was part of a series of seven large schooners built between 1903 and 1905 by the Herreshoff shipyard. Mariette and her sister-ship Vagrant are the last of this series still in service. The ships are smaller versions of the earlier Eleonora and Westward, also by Herreshoff.

Design
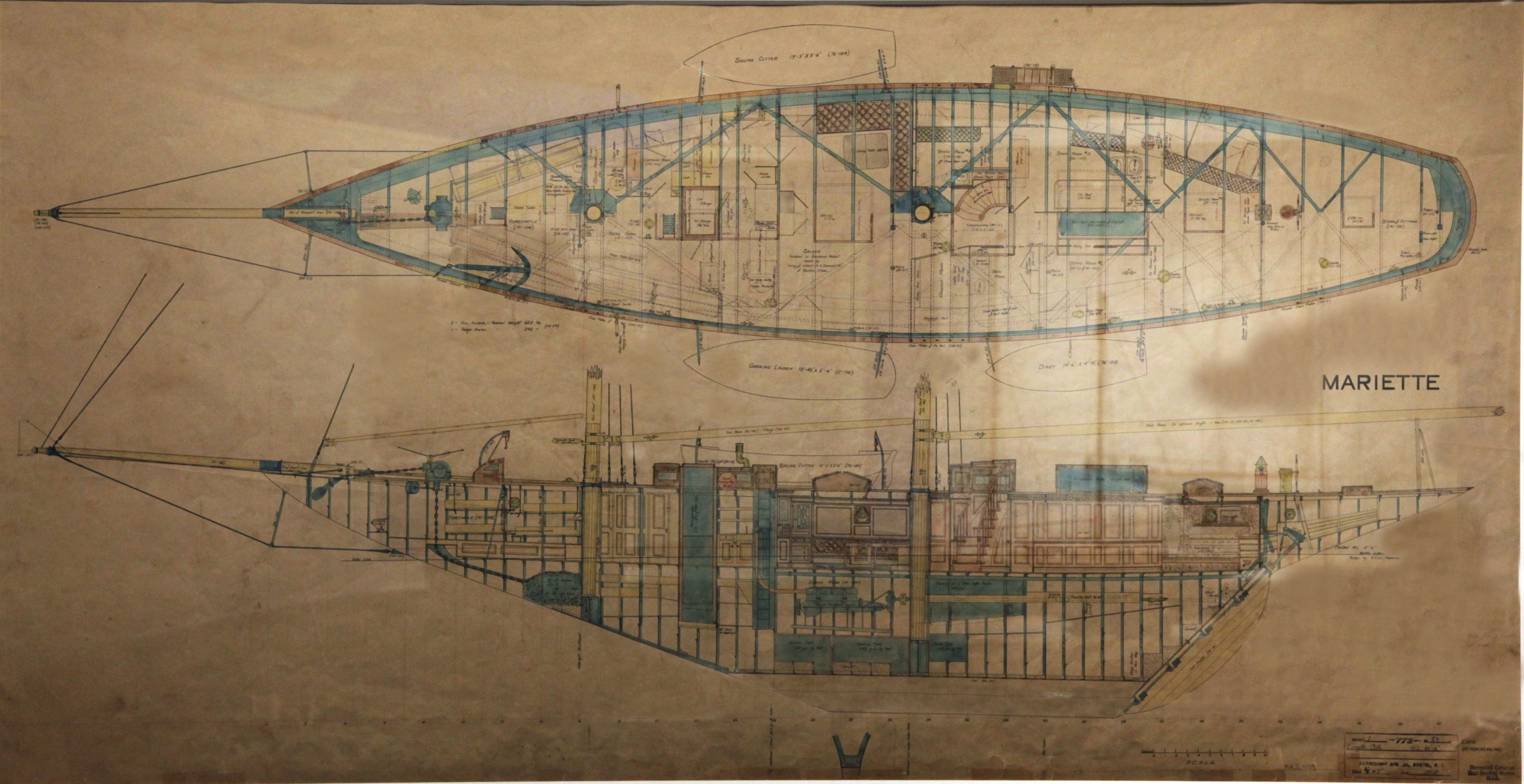
Construction plan

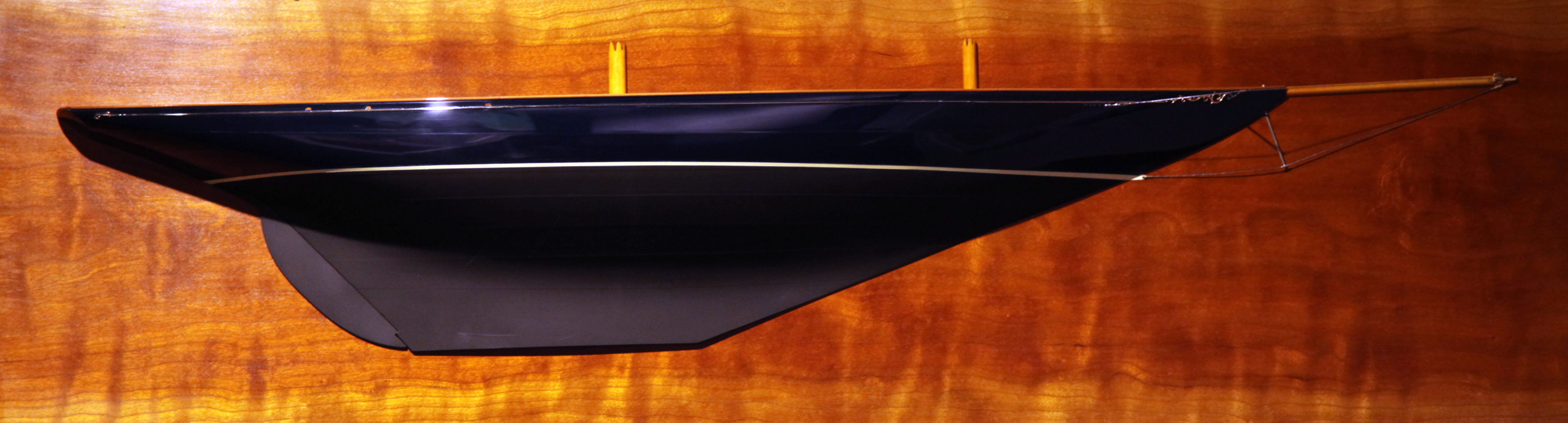
Half-hull model on display at the MIT Museum

== History ==
Skipper Jacob F. Brown sailed on Mariette until 1927. She was then sold to Francis B. Crowninshield, from a family with a sailing tradition, whose first ship was Cleopatra’s Barge. In homage to this ship, they renamed Mariette to Cleopatra’s Barge II. The rigging was modified into a Bermuda rig. Writer James A. Michener was a regular guest aboard, and mentions the ship in his novel Chesapeake (1978).

In 1939, Mariette was requisitioned for service with the US Coast Guard and used for patrols. Crowninshield was given his ship back in 1946, in a state of disrepair, and sold her.

In the following years, Mariette had several owners and various names. At some point, she was owned by Walter Boudreau under the name Janeen. From 1979 to 1990, she belonged to Andrea Rizzoli, who had her restored at the Beconcini shipyard (Cantieri Navali Beconcini) in La Spezia, Italy. In 1982, she was used as a charter in the Caribbean. In 1995, Thomas J. Perkins, from San Francisco, purchased her and restored her original rigging. The same year, Mariette collided with the 6-metre Taos Brett IV during the Nioulargue race, killing one of the sailors.

He sailed in various Mediterranean races until 2005. He then sold Mariette to a French skipper, base in Antibes.

Model on display at MIT
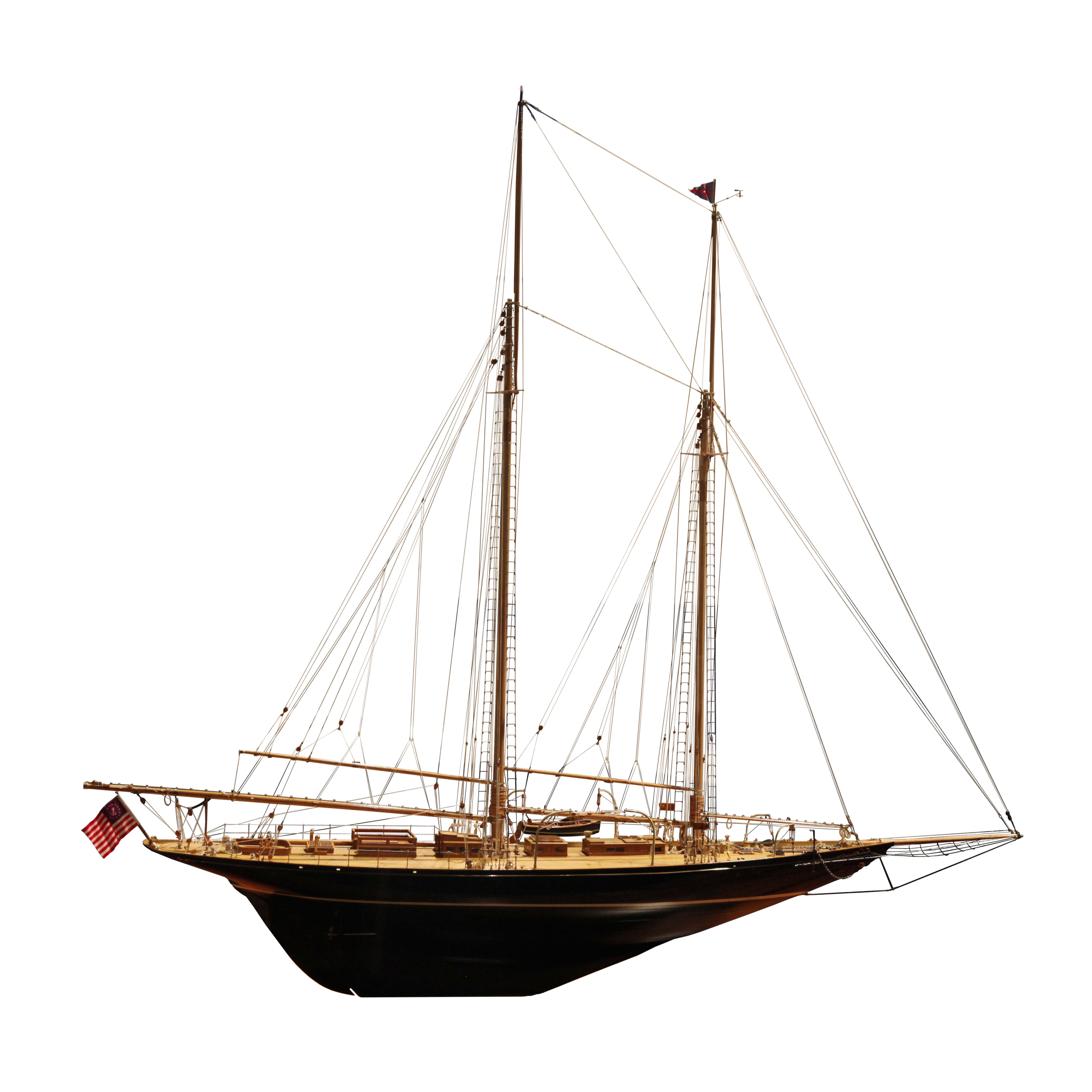
port view

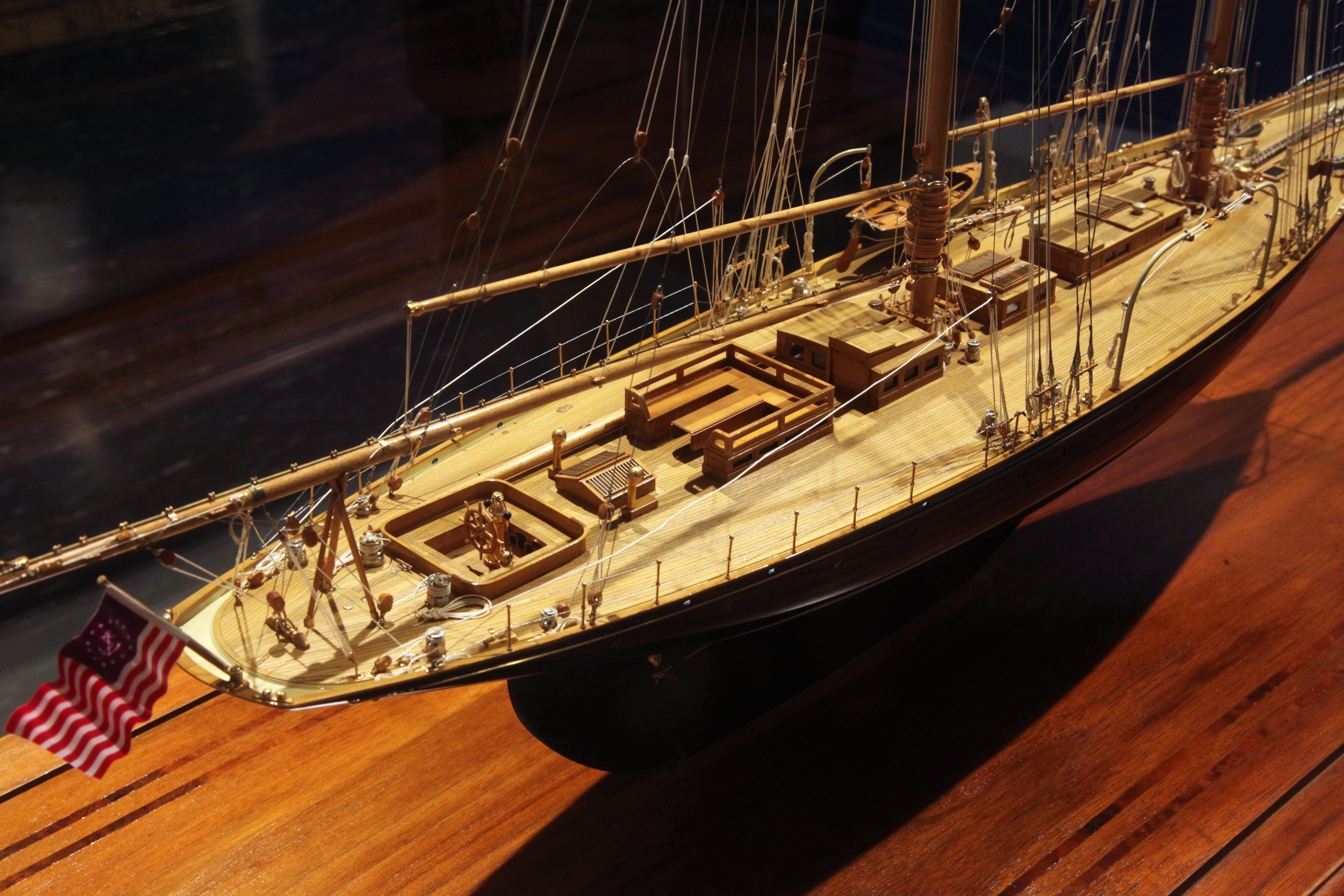
aft

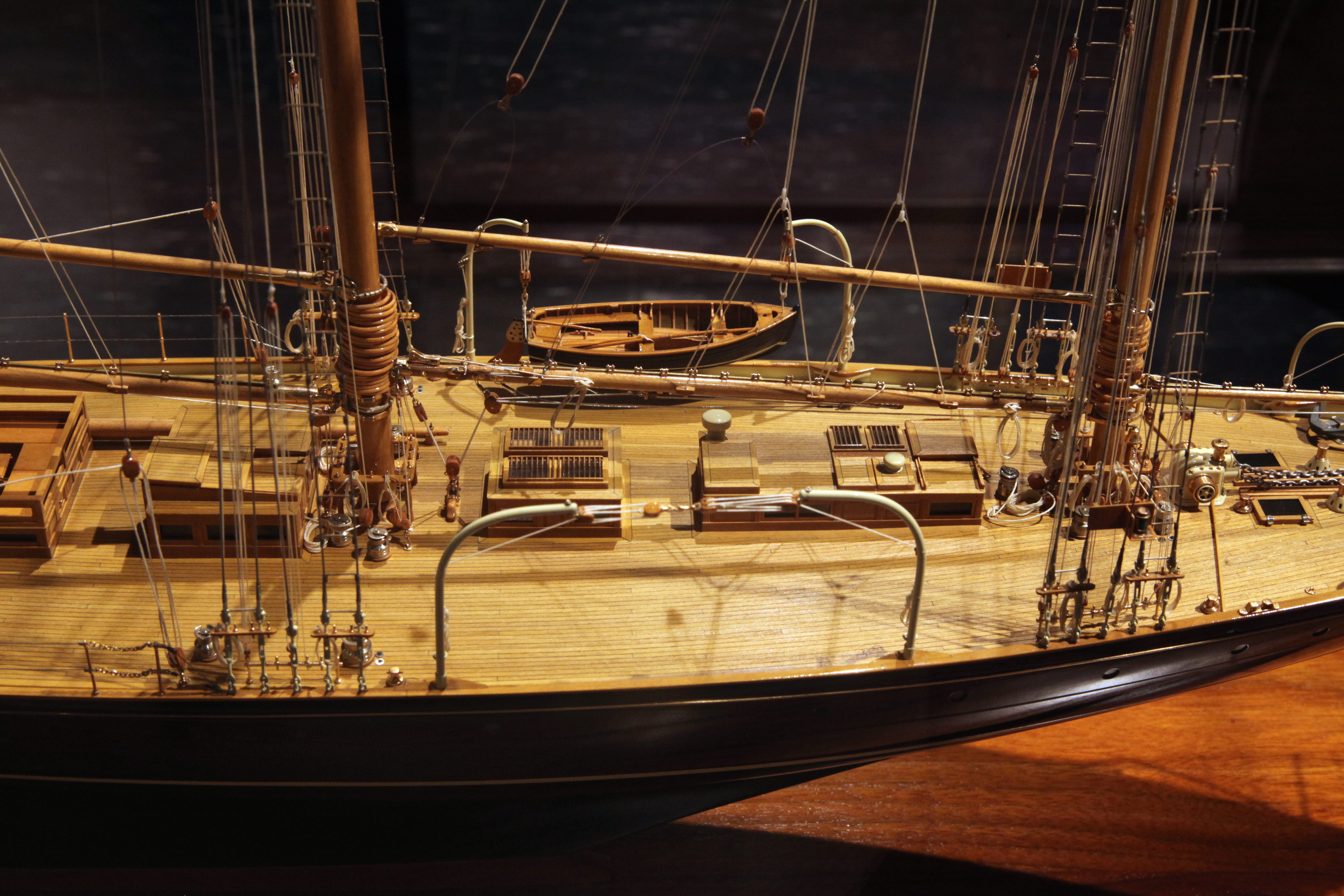
mid-section

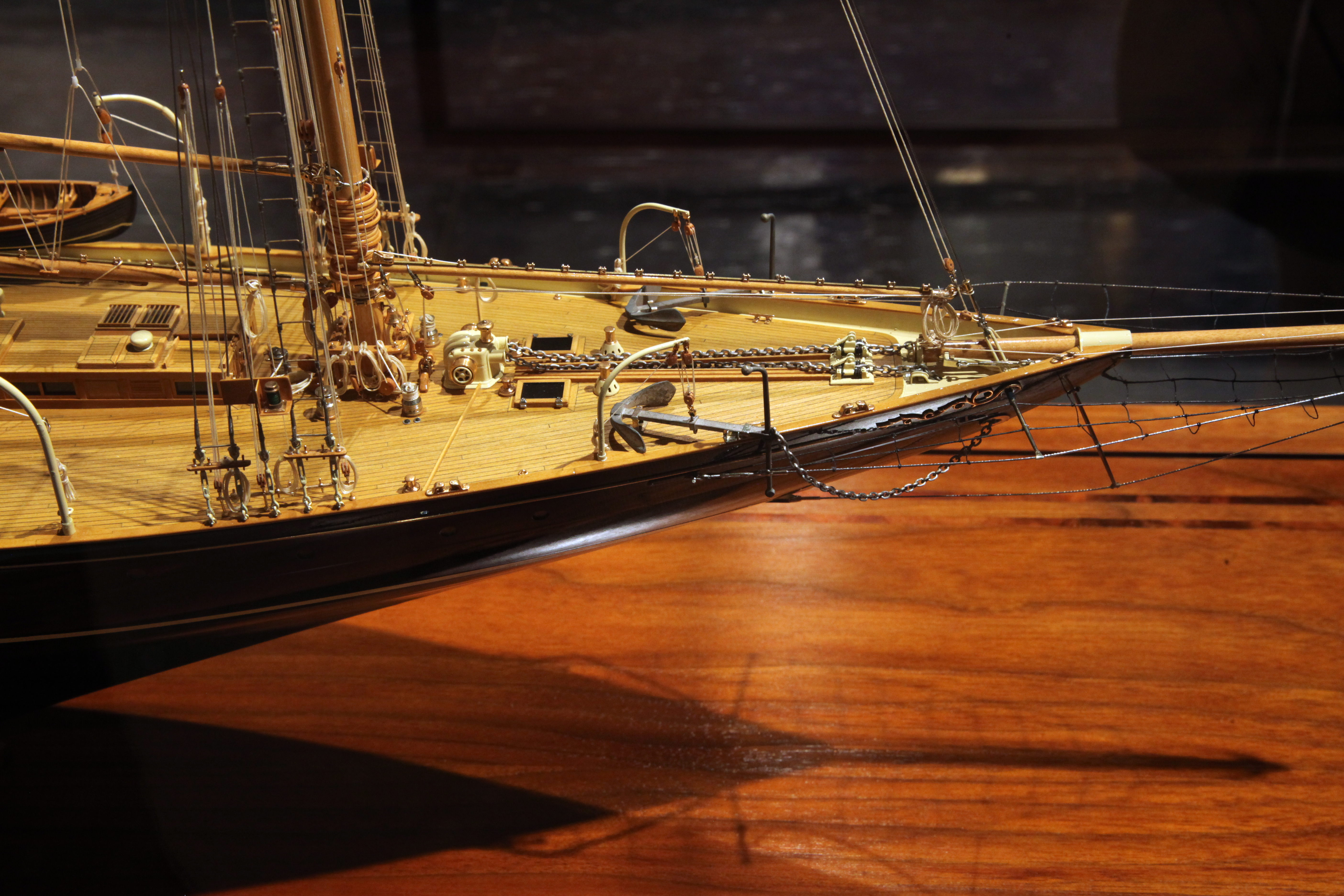
bow

== Notes and references ==
External links

- Mariette - Site classic yacht info
- MARIETTE - Site voilier à 2 mâts
- Mariette of 1915 yacht NOT for charter*
- Mariette of 1915
- Mariette
- Living legend: Inside the major refit of Herreshoff schooner Mariette of 1915
