= Claude Lucas =

French writer (born 1943)

Claude Lucas (born 30 October 1943, in La Baule-Escoublac) is a French writer.

== Biography ==
Claude Lucas grew up in Saint-Malo. During his life he experienced numerous prison experiences, especially in Spain, which he evoked in 1995 in his novel Suerte (Prix France Culture the next year).

He is also the author of radio fictions regularly broadcast by France Culture for which he received in 2012 the prix Radio SACD.

He lives on the île d'Ouessant in Brittany.

== Works ==
- 1993: L'Hypothèse de M. Baltimore, theatre, Aléas Éditeur.
- 1995: Suerte, novel, Plon - Prix France Culture 1996
- 1998: Chemin des fleurs followed by Désert, short stories, Flammarion
- 2008: Amor mío, correspondence, éditions Jacqueline Chambon
- 2010: Ti kreiz, novel, éditions P.O.L
- 2015: Une-certaine-absence@gmel.ie, novel, P.O.L
