= Michel Corneille the Younger =

French painter

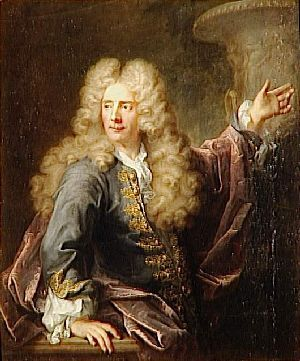
Portrait by Robert Tournières, c. 1702

Michel Corneille the Younger (1642 – 16 August 1708) was a French painter, etcher and engraver.

== Life ==
Corneille was born in Paris, the son of an artist, Michel Corneille the Elder of Orléans, and on this account is sometimes called the "younger Michel". He is also and more commonly known as the "elder Corneille" (Corneille l'Aîné), to distinguish him from a younger brother, Jean-Baptiste Corneille, also a painter. His father was the first and the most indefatigable of his teachers; his other masters were Pierre Mignard and the celebrated Charles Le Brun.

Devoting himself wholly to historical painting, Michel won the Academy Prize and went to Rome on the king's pension; but feeling his genius hampered by the restrictions of the prize, he gave up the money so that he might study the antique in his own way. Coming under the then powerful influence of the Eclectics, he studied with the Carracci and modelled his style on theirs. In 1663 he returned to Paris and was elected a member of the Royal Academy, his picture on entering being "Our Lord's Appearance to St. Peter after His Resurrection". In 1673 he became an adjunct, and, in 1690, a full, professor in the Academy.

For many years Corneille resided at the Gobelins Manufactory, and was sometimes called "Corneille des Gobelins". He died in the manufactory in 1708.

== Works ==
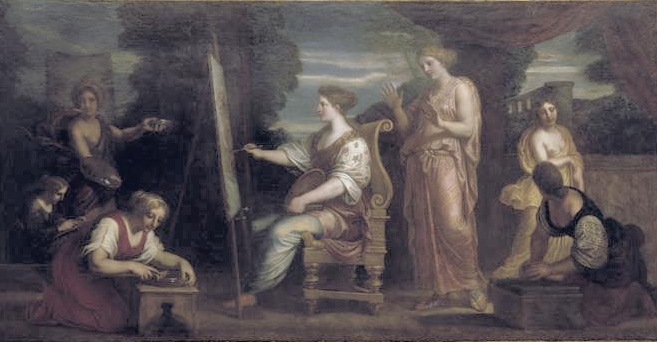
Michel Corneille the Younger, Lala de Cyzique painting, Palace of Versailles, 1672

Corneille painted for the king at Versailles, Meudon, and Fontainebleau, and decorated in fresco many of the great Paris churches, notably Notre-Dame, the church of the Capuchins, and the chapel of Saint-Grégoire in the Invalides.

His style, reminiscent of the old masters, is the conventional style of the Eclectics; his drawing, the expression on the faces of his religious subjects, the management of chiaroscuro, and the composition, are suggestive of the Venetian School. From his insufficient knowledge of the composition of pigments, the colour in many of his pictures has suffered such a change that it is today disagreeable; but the artist possessed a good colour-sense, and contemporary records go to prove that his colour was refined and pleasing. He etched and engraved over a hundred plates in a bold and free style, for he was a master of the line; but he subsequently spoiled the effect by too much and too precise work with the engraver.

A dishonest dealer put Raphael's name on some of Michel Corneille's plates, and for a long time no one disputed their attribution to the great master.

Among his paintings are a "Repose in Egypt", now in the Louvre, and a "Baptism of Constantine", in the museum at Bordeaux. Among his more important etched and engraved works are: "The Nativity"; "Flight into Egypt"; "Abraham journeying with Lot" (wrongly ascribed to Raphael), and "Jacob wrestling with the Angel", a plate after Annibale Carracci.

== Bibliography ==
- Bender, Ewald [in German] (1912). "Corneille, Michel oder Michel Ange". In Thieme, Ulrich (ed.). Allgemeines Lexikon der bildenden Künstler (in German). Vol. 7. Leipzig: E. A. Seemann. p. 424. OCLC 1039490042 – via the Internet Archive.
- Bénézit, Emmanuel (2006) [first published in French in 1911–1923]. Benezit Dictionary of Artists. Vol. 3. Paris: Gründ. pp. 1403–1404. ISBN 2-7000-3073-7 – via the Internet Archive.
- Blumer, Marie-Louise (1961). "Corneille (Michel)". In Roman d'Amat, Jean-Charles; et al. (eds.). Dictionnaire de biographie française (in French). Vol. 9. Paris: Letouzey et Ané. cols. 676–678.
- Parmantier-Lallement, Nicole (1996). "Corneille". In Turner, Jane (ed.). The Dictionary of Art. Vol. 7. New York: Grove's Dictionaries. pp. 863–864. ISBN 1-884446-00-0 – via the Internet Archive.
- Raimbault, Christine (1999). "Corneille, Michel (gen. Michel II bzw. l'aîne; Michel-Ange)". In Kasten, Eberhard; et al. (eds.). Allgemeines Künstlerlexikon (in German). Vol. 21. München, Leipzig: Saur. pp. 228–229. ISBN 3-598-22761-2 – via the Internet Archive.
- Mémoires inédits sur la vie et les ouvrages de l'Académie royale de peinture (Paris, 1884)
- Allgemeines Künstlerlexikon (Berlin, 1870)
- DURRIEN, La peinture à l'exposition de primitifs français (Paris, 1904).

That entry was written by Leigh Hunt.
