= Margret Kreidl =

Austrian writer

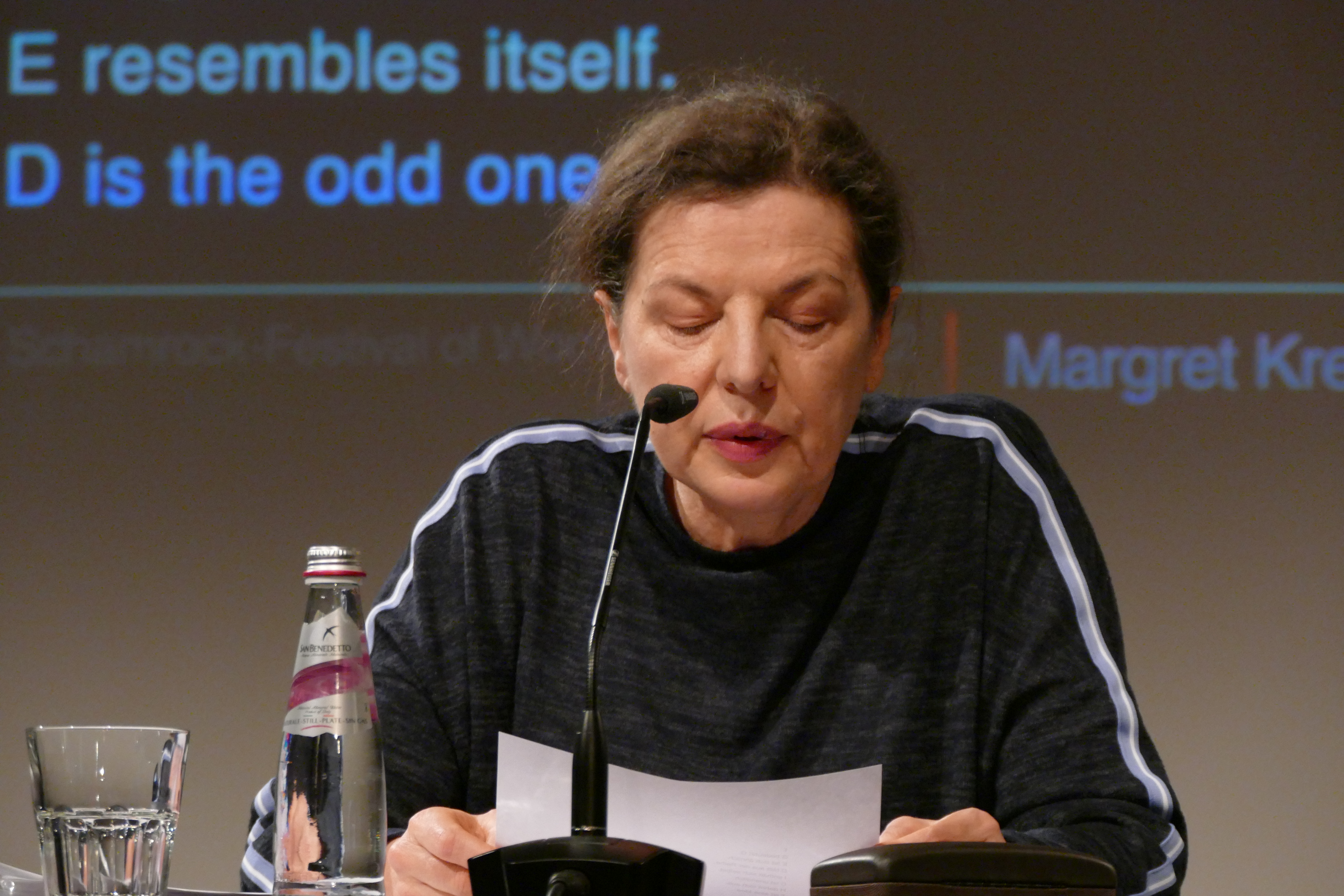
Margret Kreidl

Margret Kreidl (born 2 January 1964, in Salzburg) is an Austrian writer of plays, radio plays, poems, libretti, and prose. She was awarded a Reinhard Priessnitz Prize in 1994, an Outstanding Artist Award for Literature in 2018, and a City of Vienna Prize for Literature in 2021 for her work.
