= Lunino, Penza Oblast =

Lunino Лунино
- Urban-type settlement
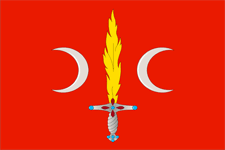
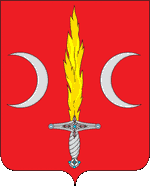
- Flag Coat of arms
- Interactive map of Lunino
- Location of Lunino Lunino (Penza Oblast)
- Coordinates: 53.5882°N 45.2227°E
- Country: Russia
- Federal subject: Penza Oblast
- Administrative district: Luninsky District
- Founded: 1665

Population (2010 Census)
  - Total: 7,905
  - Estimate (2021): 7,227 (−8.6%)
- Time zone: UTC+3 (MSK)
- Postal code: 442730
- OKTMO ID: 56643151051

Lunino (Russian: Лу́нино) is an urban locality (an urban-type settlement) in Luninsky District of Penza Oblast, Russia. Population: 7,905 (2010 census); 8,324 (2002 census); 9,086 (1989 Soviet census).
