= Claude Roy (poet) =

French poet and essayist (1915–1997)

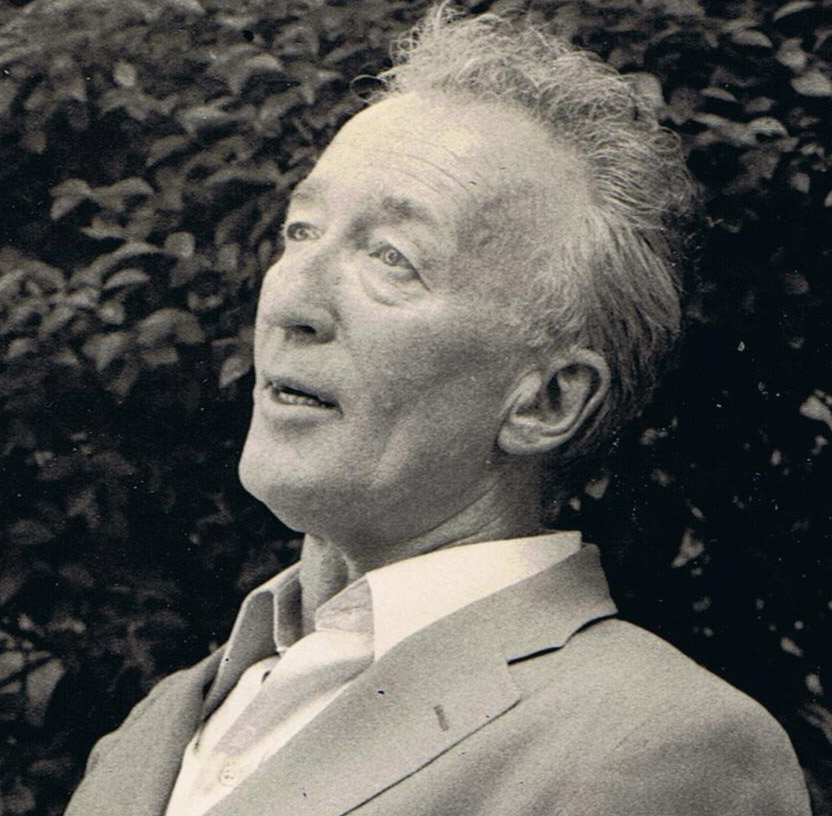
- Claude Roy at his country house in 1983
- Born: 28 August 1915; 8th arrondissement of Paris (France)
- Died: 13 December 1997 (aged 82); 6th arrondissement of Paris (France)
- Occupation: Poet, critic, writer, literary critic
- Awards: Fénéon Prize for literature (1951); Prix Bernard Versele (1983); Prix Goncourt de la Poésie (1985); Prix Guillaume Apollinaire (1995); Prix France Culture (1990); Prix Valery Larbaud (1969)

Claude Roy (28 August 1915 – 13 December 1997) was a French poet and essayist. He was born and died in Paris.

== Biography ==
After the fall of France during World War II, Roy was captured as a prisoner of war. He later escaped and joined the French Resistance. Initially associated with the political right, by 1943 Roy drifted towards the left under the influence of Louis Aragon and adhered to the French Communist Party, openly attacking fascism and Vichy sympathizers. He left the Communist Party after the suppression of the Hungarian Revolution of 1956 and, as a contributor to Le Nouvel Observateur, became a fixture on the anti-totalitarian left. He was a signatory to the Manifesto of the 121 in favor of Algerian independence.

== Awards ==
- 1951 Fénéon Prize for Le poète mineur
- 1969 Prix Valery Larbaud for his book Le verbe Aimer et autres essais
- 1985 Prix Goncourt de la Poésie

== Works ==
=== Non-Fiction ===
- Défense de la littérature, idées, folio
- Moi je, Gallimard, 1969; Folio, 1978
- Nous, Gallimard, 1972; Folio, 1980
- Somme toute, Gallimard, 1976; Folio, 1982. Prix Saint-Simon 1976
- Permis de séjour, 1977-1982, Gallimard, 1983; Folio, 1987
- La Fleur du temps, 1983-1987, Gallimard, 1988; Folio, 1992
- L'Étonnement du voyageur, 1987-1989, Gallimard, 1990, prix France Culture
- Le Rivage des jours, 1990-1991, Gallimard, 1992
- Les Rencontres des jours, 1992-1993, Gallimard, 1995; Folio, 1996
- Chemins croisés, 1994-1995, Gallimard, 1997

=== Novels ===
- La nuit est le manteau des pauvres, Gallimard, 1949
- À tort ou à raison, Gallimard, 1955
- Le Soleil sur la terre, Gallimard, 1956
- Le Malheur d'aimer, Gallimard, 1958, Folio, 1974
- Léone et les siens, Gallimard, 1963
- La Dérobée, Gallimard, 1968
- La Traversée du pont des arts, Gallimard, 1979, Folio, 1983
- L'Ami lointain, Gallimard, 1987, Folio, 1990

=== Poetry ===
- L'Enfance de l'Art, Alger 1942
- Clair comme le jour, 1943
- Aragon,1945
- Le bestiaire des amants, 1946
- La nuit est le manteau des pauvres, 1948
- Le Poète mineur, Gallimard, 1949
- L'Élegie des lieux communs, 1952
- La Chine dans un miroir, 1953
- Un seul poème, Gallimard, 1954
- Poésies, Poésie/Gallimard, 1953
- L'amour parle, 1953
- Jules Supervielle, 1964
- La Dérobée, 1968
- Enfantasques, poèmes et collages, Gallimard, 1974
- Nouvelles Enfantasques, poèmes et collages, Gallimard, 1978
- Sais-tu si nous sommes encore loin de la mer ? Gallimard, 1979, Poésie/Gallimard, 1983
- À la lisière du temps, Gallimard, 1984
- Le Voyage d'automne, Gallimard, 1987
- Le Noir de l'aube, Gallimard, 1990
- Le Voleur de poèmes : Chine, 250 poèmes dérobés du chinois, Mercure de France, 1991
- Les Pas du silence, suivi de Poèmes en amont, Gallimard, 1993
- Poèmes à pas de loup, 1992-1996, Gallimard, 1997
- Hommage à Jules Verne, Gallimard, 1970
