= Luninsky District =

Luninsky District Лунинский район
- District
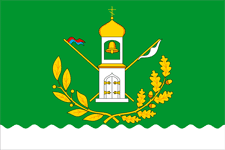
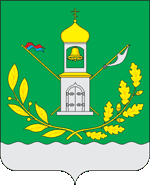
- Flag Coat of arms
- Location of Luninsky District in Penza Oblast
- Coordinates: 53°35′38″N 45°13′41″E
- Country: Russia
- Federal subject: Penza Oblast
- Established: 16 July 1928
- Administrative center: Lunino

Area
  - Total: 1,705 km^{2} (658 sq mi)

Population (2010 Census)
  - Total: 19,944
  - Density: 11.70/km^{2} (30.30/sq mi)
  - Urban: 39.6%
  - Rural: 60.4%

Administrative structure
  - Administrative divisions: 1 Work settlements, 9 Selsoviets
  - Inhabited localities: 1 urban-type settlements, 56 rural localities

Municipal structure
  - Municipally incorporated as: Luninsky Municipal District
  - Municipal divisions: 1 urban settlements, 9 rural settlements
- Time zone: UTC+3 (MSK)
- OKTMO ID: 56643000
- Website: http://rlun.pnzreg.ru/

Luninsky District (Russian: Лу́нинский райо́н) is an administrative and municipal district (raion), one of the twenty-seven in Penza Oblast, Russia. It is located in the north of the oblast. The area of the district is 1,705 square kilometers (658 sq mi). Its administrative center is the urban locality (a work settlement) of Lunino. Population: 19,944 (2010 Census); 23,247 (2002 Census); 26,211 (1989 Soviet census). The population of Lunino accounts for 39.6% of the district's total population.

== Notable residents ==
- Vladimir Istomin (1810–1855), rear admiral, hero of the Siege of Sevastopol
- Anton Legashov (1798–1865), painter, born in Lipovka
