= Pierre-Jean Mariette =

French art historian (1694–1774)

- Portrait of Pierre-Jean Mariette engraved by Augustin de Saint-Aubin after a drawing by Charles-Nicolas Cochin
- Born: 7 May 1694; Paris
- Died: 10 September 1774; Paris
- Occupations: Art historian, printer, publisher, collector, book printer
- Father: Jean Mariette

Pierre-Jean Mariette (French pronunciation: [pjɛʁ ʒɑ̃ maʁjɛt]; 7 May 1694 – 10 September 1774) was a collector of and dealer in old master prints, a renowned connoisseur, especially of prints and drawings, and a chronicler of the careers of French Italian and Flemish artists. He was born and died in Paris, and was a central figure in the artistic culture of the city for decades.

== Early life and training ==
Mariette was born to a long-established and highly successful family of engravers, book publishers and printsellers in Paris. His father was Jean Mariette (1660–1742). In 1657 his father's father, Pierre Mariette (ii) (1634–1716), had bought the family business from his ailing father, Pierre Mariette (i) (1596–1657), for 30,000 livres.

Family connections put him in contact as a young man with antiquarians such as the comte de Caylus, for whom Mariette would write his Lettre sur Leonardo da Vinci, printed as a preface to Caylus's book on Leonardo's caricatures, 1730. In 1722 he first met the immensely rich patron of the arts Pierre Crozat, whom he advised, whose collection he catalogued and from whose sale he purchased outstanding drawings.

Following his education at a Jesuit college in Paris, Mariette was sent on a tour in 1717 to refine his connoisseurship and expand family connections. He initially traveled to Amsterdam, then a major center of the art trade, before visiting Germany. In Vienna, he cataloged the art collection of Prince Eugene of Savoy. Throughout his travels, Mariette established and maintained extensive correspondence with members of Europe's scholarly and artistic communities.

== Later career ==
Through his artistic connections, Mariette was named a member of the prestigious Accademia delle Arti del Disegno, Florence, in 1733. His knowledge of prints and his close friendship with Caylus and the artist Charles-Antoine Coypel secured him a position reorganizing the old master print collection of the Bibliothèque Royale. In 1741 Mariette was asked to write the sale catalogue of Crozat's collection of paintings and antiquities, the first example of the modern descriptive sale catalogue. He purchased some of Crozat's drawings at the sale himself; a provenance from Mariette's collection, with its discrete collector's stamp, adds allure even to great Old Master drawings: a head by Andrea del Sarto, from the collections of Giorgio Vasari, Crozat and Mariette fetched £6,504,000 (ca $11,740,072) at auction in 2005

Mariette engraved and printed several plates, an aspect of the family business. His engravings illustrated the Cours d'architecture qui comprend les ordres de Vignole ä ceux de Michel-Ange of Augustin-Charles d'Aviler (Paris, 1760), Before the death of his father in 1742, Mariette had already been running the family publishing and print-making business, an aspect of his career often overlooked by art historians. The firm had published Pierre Fauchard's Le chirurgien dentiste, ou traité des dents 1728, the first modern work on dentistry and a milestone of medical history,

By 1750 he sold the family business that he had inherited in 1744, in order to purchase the office of Contrôleur Général de la Grande Chancellerie, a sinecure that allowed him to devote the rest of his life to his researches and to increasing his celebrated collection. He concentrated on prints and drawings, but also included paintings, bronzes and terracottas. Among his great drawings was a Michelangelo study of a nude for the Sistine Chapel. He shared Crozat's taste for the drawings of Rubens: at Crozat's sale he purchased sixty-two of the finest for his own collection. When his collections were dispersed at auction after his death, 1266 drawings were acquired by the Crown; they now form part of the collection at the Bibliothèque nationale. The albums of more than 3500 prints mounted on fine paper, which had been begun by his father, Jean Mariette, passed into the collection of the Earls Spencer. These "Spencer Albums" of Mariette's prints are one of the most important acquisitions made by the Harvard University Art Museums in recent years. The albums include etchings and engravings in a near-perfect state of preservation by Italian, Dutch, and Flemish printmakers, including Jacques Callot, Jusepe de Ribera, and Adriaen van Ostade.

Mariette also collected contemporary French paintings, Although he was immune to the forceful realism of Chardin, the more sentimental charm of Greuze found a place on his walls: Greuze's Young Peasant Boy, shown at the Salon of 1763 had already been purchased by Mariette, together with its pendant, before it was exhibited.

Mariette's further published works were not many. In 1750 he published a Traité historique des pierres gravées du Cabinet du Roi, on the hardstone carvings in the royal collection. His reputation as a connoisseur, who laid down the principles by which the hands of Italian master drawings could be ascertained, led to him being made an associate, then an honorary (1757) member of the Académie royale de peinture et de sculpture.

In 1764-65 he got into a public dispute in the pages of the Gazette littéraire de l'Europe with Giovanni Battista Piranesi, whom Mariette admired greatly as an artist, over Piranesi's polemical stand that the magnificence of Roman art derived from its Etruscan roots, rather than from its Greek borrowings

Mariette's circle of friends was large, included Andre-Charles Boulle and was broad enough to define the state of art connoisseurship in France during his time, beginning with the circle he met at the houses of the prodigious collection Pierre-Antoine Crozat, where besides artists like Antoine Watteau and the classicizing sculptor Edmé Bouchardon, Mariette met the abbé de Maroulle and the comte de Caylus, who helped sharpen his eye.

Mariette married Angélique-Catherine Doyen in 1724. He acquired a country house at Croissy, which he named "Le Colifichet" was ennobled during the reign of Louis XV, and honored with the Order of the Saint-Esprit.

== Mariette's dictionary of artists ==
His major ambition was to write a history of engraving and a dictionary of artists. In preparation, he compiled numerous annotations to the Abecedario pittorico (1719 edition) of Pellegrino Antonio Orlandi. His father's notes on artists, accumulated in the course of the art trade, and his own wide experience and correspondence among the cognoscenti, were the basis of these projects, none of which, however, ever came to fruition. Caylus used Mariette's notes on Vasari's Lives for his manuscript Vies d’artistes du XVIIIe siècle.

Fortunately a corpus of Mariette's assembled materials— pamphlets, manuscripts, salon and exhibition catalogues, including the salon criticism of Diderot—came into the hands of Charles-Nicolas Cochin, an artist and guiding spirit of Neoclassicism, and, greatly augmented, was deposited in 1880 at the Bibliothèque Nationale

Not until 1851 were Mariette's notes and anecdotes entered in the Abecedario compiled by Philippe de Chennevières and Anatole de Montaiglon, in the six volumes of Abecedario de P.J. Mariette et autres notes inédites de cet amateur sur les arts et les artistes (Paris, 1851–60).

== Louvre exhibition ==
An exhibition at the Musée du Louvre in 1967 drew together materials to honour his memory, occasioning a rich catalogue and a vita by the editor of The Burlington Magazine; it provoked a resurgence of scholarly interest in the history of taste and the role of other Parisian taste-makers, such as the marchands-merciers, like Edme-François Gersaint.
