= House of Glücksburg =

European royal house of German origin

- Parent house: House of Oldenburg (via Schleswig-Holstein-Sonderburg)
- Country: Duchy of Schleswig; Duchy of Holstein; Kingdom of Denmark; Kingdom of Greece; Kingdom of Norway; United Kingdom of Great Britain and Northern Ireland
- Founded: 6 July 1825; 201 years ago (17 December 1633; 392 years ago as Beck)
- Founder: Friedrich Wilhelm, Duke of Schleswig-Holstein-Sonderburg-Glücksburg
- Titles: List: King of Denmark; King of Norway; King of the Hellenes; King of the United Kingdom; Duke of Schleswig-Holstein; Duke of Schleswig-Holstein-Sonderburg-Glücksburg
- Connected families: Bourbon-Anjou
- Cadet branches: Danish royal family; Greek royal family; Norwegian royal family; Mountbatten-Windsor

The House of Schleswig-Holstein-Sonderburg-Glücksburg, also known by its short name as the House of Glücksburg, is the senior surviving branch of the German House of Oldenburg, one of Europe's oldest royal houses. Glücksburg house members have reigned at various times in Denmark, (Note: Oldenburg family members reigned in Denmark from Christian I of Denmark became King of Denmark in 1448. The last sovereign who descended patrilineally from the House of Glücksburg and House of Oldenburg was Margrethe II. The Danish royal family continues using the name Glücksburg, although the present king—since 2024—descends patrilineally from the Monpezat family.) Norway, Greece, the United Kingdom and in northern German states. (Note: King Charles III of the United Kingdom is agnatically descended from the House of Glücksburg via his father Prince Philip of Greece and Denmark. However, he and his family belong to the House of Windsor.) It takes its name from the family seat in Glücksburg, a small town in Schleswig-Holstein, Germany.

Patrilineal members of the House of Glücksburg include the current King of Norway, Haakon VIII, the former monarchs Queen Margrethe II of Denmark and Constantine II of Greece, and former consorts Queen Anne-Marie of Greece, Queen Sofía of Spain, and Prince Philip, Duke of Edinburgh.

The present senior member of the House of Oldenburg and the House of Glücksburg and traditional heir to the family's ancestral lands, including Glücksburg itself, is Friedrich Ferdinand, Prince of Schleswig-Holstein (born 1985), who heads the foundation that owns the family's ancestral seat, Glücksburg Castle.

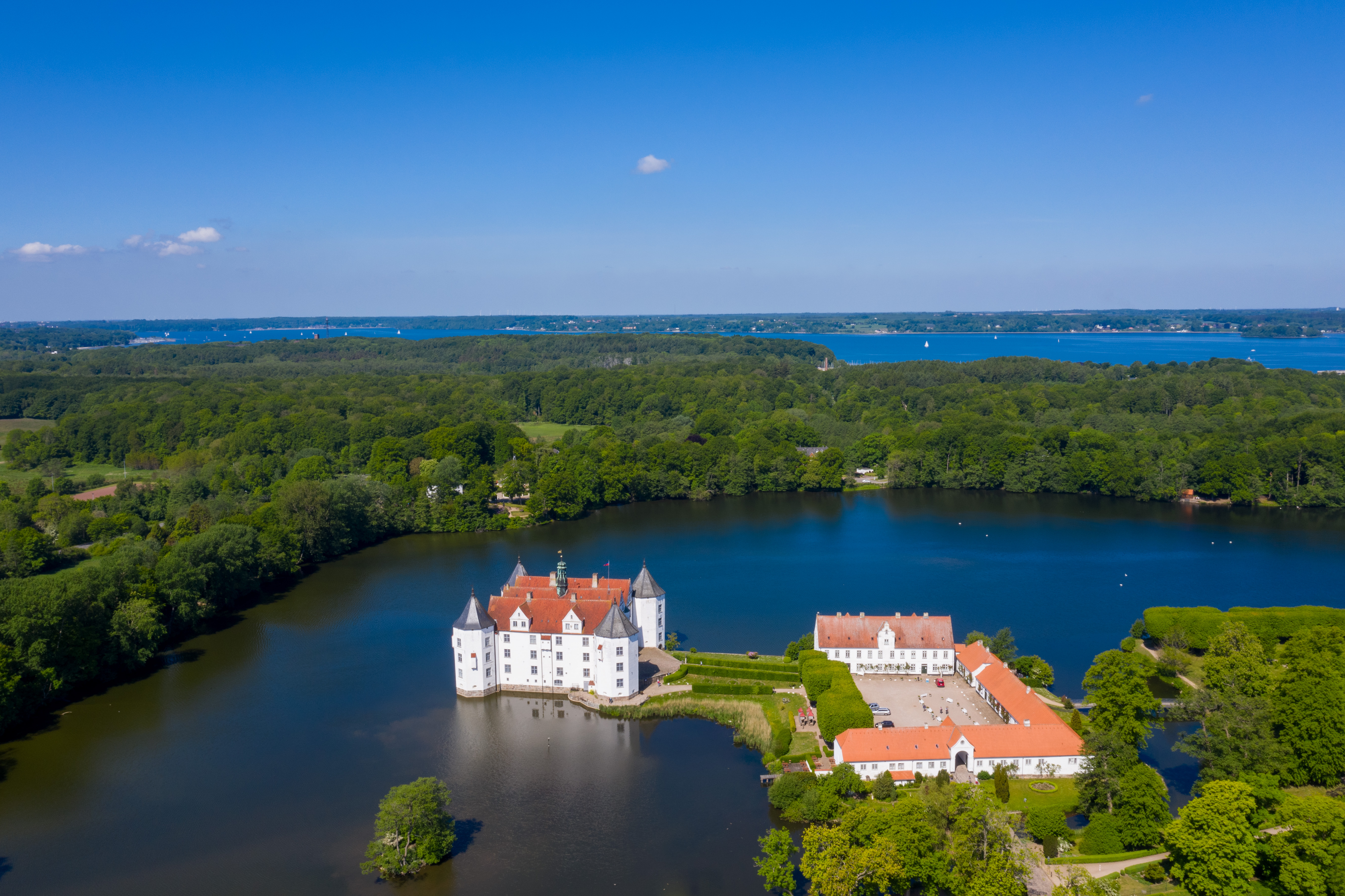
Glücksburg Castle, with the Flensburg Firth (separating Denmark and Germany) in the background

== Etymology ==
"House of Glücksburg" is the shortened form of "House of Schleswig-Holstein-Sonderburg-Glücksburg"—a collateral branch of the House of Oldenburg. The house derives its name from two regions and two towns on the Jutland Peninsula.

The two regions of Schleswig and Holstein are divided by the Eider River. While Schleswig for centuries constituted the southernmost region of Denmark, Holstein historically has been the northernmost area within the Holy Roman Empire. The northern border of Holstein along the Eider had already formed the northern border of Francia and the Carolingian Empire, after Emperor Charlemagne, upon the Saxon Wars, reached an agreement with King Hemming of Denmark in 811. The lands of Schleswig beyond the river remained a fief of the Danish Crown, while Holstein became an integral part of East Francia, the Kingdom of Germany and the Holy Roman Empire. Even earlier, the Eider had already been the border river between Saxons and Polabian Slavs to the south, and Danes and North Frisians to the north. This is evidenced in the largely Slavic-derived toponomy in Eastern Holstein, as opposed to the many Danish-derived place names in Schleswig including Southern Schleswig. Since the 1920 Schleswig plebiscites, Schleswig has been divided between Denmark (Northern Schleswig), and Germany (Southern Schleswig).

The town of Sønderborg—the German name of which is "Sonderburg"—is located on the northern shores of the Flensburg Firth in Denmark (Northern Schleswig), while Glücksburg lies on the southern shores of the firth in Germany (Southern Schleswig).

Since Glücksburg Castle is the ancestral seat of the house, the house is mostly shortened to just "House of Glücksburg". It is also spelled "House of Glücksborg" (the name of Glücksburg in the local Low German dialect) or Huset Lyksborg (the Danish name of Glücksburg). (See Glücksburgske slægt.)

The literal translation of "Glücksburg" is "Luck Castle" (Glück = luck; Burg = castle).

== History ==
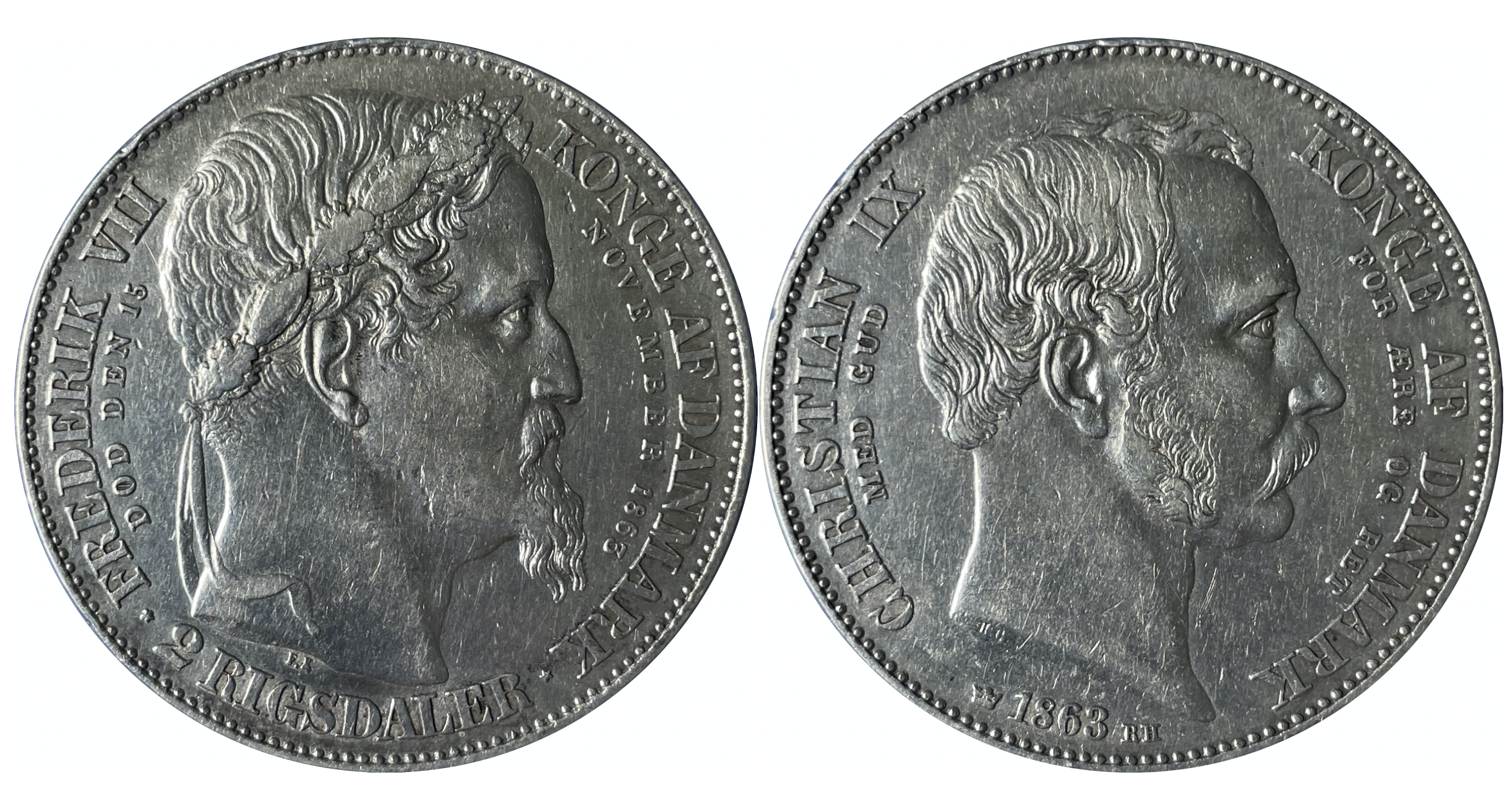
2 rigsdaler – death of Frederik VII and accession of Christian IX marking the transfer of the throne to the Glücksburg branch of the House of Oldenburg

Glücksburg is a small coastal town on the German southern side of the fjord of Flensburg that divides Germany from Denmark. In 1460, Glücksburg came, as part of the conjoined Dano-German duchies of Schleswig and Holstein, to Count Christian of Oldenburg whom, in 1448, the Danes had elected their king as Christian I, the Norwegians likewise taking him as their hereditary king in 1450.

In 1564, Christian I's great-grandson, King Frederick II, in re-distributing Schleswig and Holstein's fiefs, retained some lands for his own senior royal line while allocating Glücksburg to his brother Duke John the Younger (1545–1622), along with Sønderborg, in appanage. John's heirs further sub-divided their share and created, among other branches, a line of Schleswig-Holstein-Sonderburg dukes at Beck (an estate near Minden bought by the family in 1605), who remained vassals of Denmark's kings.

By 1825, the castle of Glücksburg had returned to the Danish crown (from another ducal branch called Glücksburg, extinct in 1779) and was given that year by King Frederick VI, along with a new ducal title, to his kinsman Frederick of Schleswig-Holstein-Sonderburg-Beck. Frederick suffixed the territorial designation to the ducal title he already held, in lieu of "Beck" (an estate the family had, in fact, sold in 1745). Thus emerged the extant Dukes of Schleswig-Holstein-Sonderburg-Glücksburg.

The Danish line of Oldenburg kings died out in 1863, and the elder line of the Schleswig-Holstein family became extinct with the death of the last Augustenburg duke in 1931. Thereafter, the House of Glücksburg became the senior surviving line of the House of Oldenburg. Another cadet line of Oldenburgs, the Dukes of Holstein-Gottorp, consisted of two branches which held onto sovereignty into the 20th century. But members of the Romanov line were executed in or exiled from their Russian Empire in 1917, while the Grand Duchy of Oldenburg was abolished in 1918, although its dynastic line survives.

Neither the Dukes of Beck nor of Glücksburg had been sovereign rulers; they held their lands in fief from the ruling Dukes of Schleswig and Holstein, i.e. the Kings of Denmark and (until 1773) the Dukes of Holstein-Gottorp.

Prince Christian of Schleswig-Holstein-Sonderburg-Glücksburg, the fourth son of Duke Friedrich of Glücksburg, was recognized in the London Protocol of 1852 as successor to the childless King Frederick VII of Denmark. He became King of Denmark as Christian IX on 15 November 1863.

Prince Vilhelm, the second son of Crown Prince Christian and Crown Princess Luise, was elected King of the Hellenes on 30 March 1863, succeeding the ousted Wittelsbach Otto of Greece and reigning under the name George I.

Prince Carl, the second son of Frederick VIII of Denmark, Christian IX's eldest son, became King of Norway on 18 November 1905 as Haakon VII.

Christian IX's daughters, Alexandra and Dagmar (as Maria Feodorovna), became the consorts of, respectively, King Edward VII of the United Kingdom and Emperor Alexander III of Russia. As a result, by 1914 descendants of King Christian IX held the crowns of several European realms, and he became known as the "Father-in-law of Europe".

Christian IX's older brother inherited formal headship of the family as Karl, Duke of Schleswig-Holstein-Sonderburg-Glücksburg, followed by their brother Friedrich, Duke of Schleswig-Holstein-Sonderburg-Glücksburg. It is his descendants who now represent the senior line of the Schleswig-Holstein branch of the House of Oldenburg, with Friedrich Ferdinand, Prince of Schleswig-Holstein, as its current head.

== Patrilineal ancestry of Duke Friedrich Wilhelm ==
1. Elimar I, Count of Oldenburg
2. Elimar II, Count of Oldenburg
3. Christian I, Count of Oldenburg (Christian the Quarrelsome)
4. Maurice, Count of Oldenburg
5. Christian II, Count of Oldenburg
6. John I, Count of Oldenburg
7. Christian III, Count of Oldenburg
8. John II, Count of Oldenburg
9. Conrad I, Count of Oldenburg
10. Christian V, Count of Oldenburg
11. Dietrich, Count of Oldenburg
12. Christian I of Denmark
13. Frederick I of Denmark
14. Christian III of Denmark
15. John II, Duke of Schleswig-Holstein-Sonderburg
16. Alexander, Duke of Schleswig-Holstein-Sonderburg
17. August Philipp, Duke of Schleswig-Holstein-Sonderburg-Beck
18. Frederick Louis, Duke of Schleswig-Holstein-Sonderburg-Beck
19. Peter August, Duke of Schleswig-Holstein-Sonderburg-Beck
20. Karl Anton August, Prince of Schleswig-Holstein-Sonderburg-Beck
21. Friedrich Karl Ludwig, Duke of Schleswig-Holstein-Sonderburg-Beck
22. Friedrich Wilhelm, Duke of Schleswig-Holstein-Sonderburg-Glücksburg

== Schleswig-Holstein-Sonderburg-Glücksburg ==
Coat of arms of the Dukes of Schleswig-Holstein-Sondebourg-Augustenbourg later Schleswig-Holstein-Sondebourg-Glücksburg

The Dukes of Schleswig-Holstein-Sonderburg-Glücksburg constitute the senior male line of the branch. They hold the headship by primogeniture of the cadet house of Glücksburg. The headship by agnatic primogeniture of the entire House of Oldenburg is held by Friedrich Ferdinand, Prince of Schleswig-Holstein.

Portrait	Name	Life	Reign	Duration
	Friedrich Wilhelm, Duke of Schleswig-Holstein-Sonderburg-Glücksburg	1785–1831	1825–1831	6 years
	Karl, Duke of Schleswig-Holstein-Sonderburg-Glücksburg	1813–1878	1831–1878	47 years
	Friedrich, Duke of Schleswig-Holstein-Sonderburg-Glücksburg	1814–1885	1878–1885	7 years
	Friedrich Ferdinand, Duke of Schleswig-Holstein	1855–1934	1885–1934	49 years
	Wilhelm Friedrich, Duke of Schleswig-Holstein	1891–1965	1934–1965	31 years
	Peter, Duke of Schleswig-Holstein	1922–1980	1965–1980	15 years
	Christoph, Prince of Schleswig-Holstein	1949–2023	1980–2023	43 years
	Friedrich Ferdinand, Prince of Schleswig-Holstein	born 1985	2023–present	Incumbent

The heir apparent is Prince Alfred of Schleswig-Holstein (born 2019).

== Denmark ==
Current royal Coat of arms of Denmark of Frederick X.

In 1852, Prince Christian of Schleswig-Holstein-Sonderburg-Glücksburg became heir-presumptive to the Kingdom of Denmark, and in 1863, he ascended the throne. He was the fourth son of Friedrich Wilhelm, Duke of Schleswig-Holstein-Sonderburg-Glücksburg, whose elder brother (and male-line descendants) retained the Glücksburg dukedom. The Danish royal family still calls itself Glücksborg, using a slightly Danicized form of Glücksburg.

Portrait	Name	Life	Reign	Additional titles
	Christian IX	1818–1906	1863–1906	King of the Wends; King of the Goths; Duke of Schleswig, Holstein, Stormarn, Dithmarschen, Lauenburg and Oldenburg; Prior to ascending the throne: Prince of Schleswig-Holstein-Sonderburg-Glücksburg (Danish: Prins af Slesvig-Holsten-Sønderborg-Glückborg)
	Frederik VIII	1843–1912	1906–1912	King of the Wends; King of the Goths; Duke of Schleswig, Holstein, Stormarn, Dithmarschen, Lauenburg and Oldenburg
	Christian X	1870–1947	1912–1947	King of Iceland (used 1918–1944); King of the Wends; King of the Goths; Duke of Schleswig, Holstein, Stormarn, Dithmarschen, Lauenburg and Oldenburg
	Frederik IX	1899–1972	1947–1972	King of the Wends; King of the Goths; Duke of Schleswig, Holstein, Stormarn, Dithmarschen, Lauenburg and Oldenburg
	Margrethe II	born 1940	1972–2024	
	Frederik X	born 1968	2024–present	Count of Monpezat

== Greece ==
Coat of arms of the King of the Hellenes

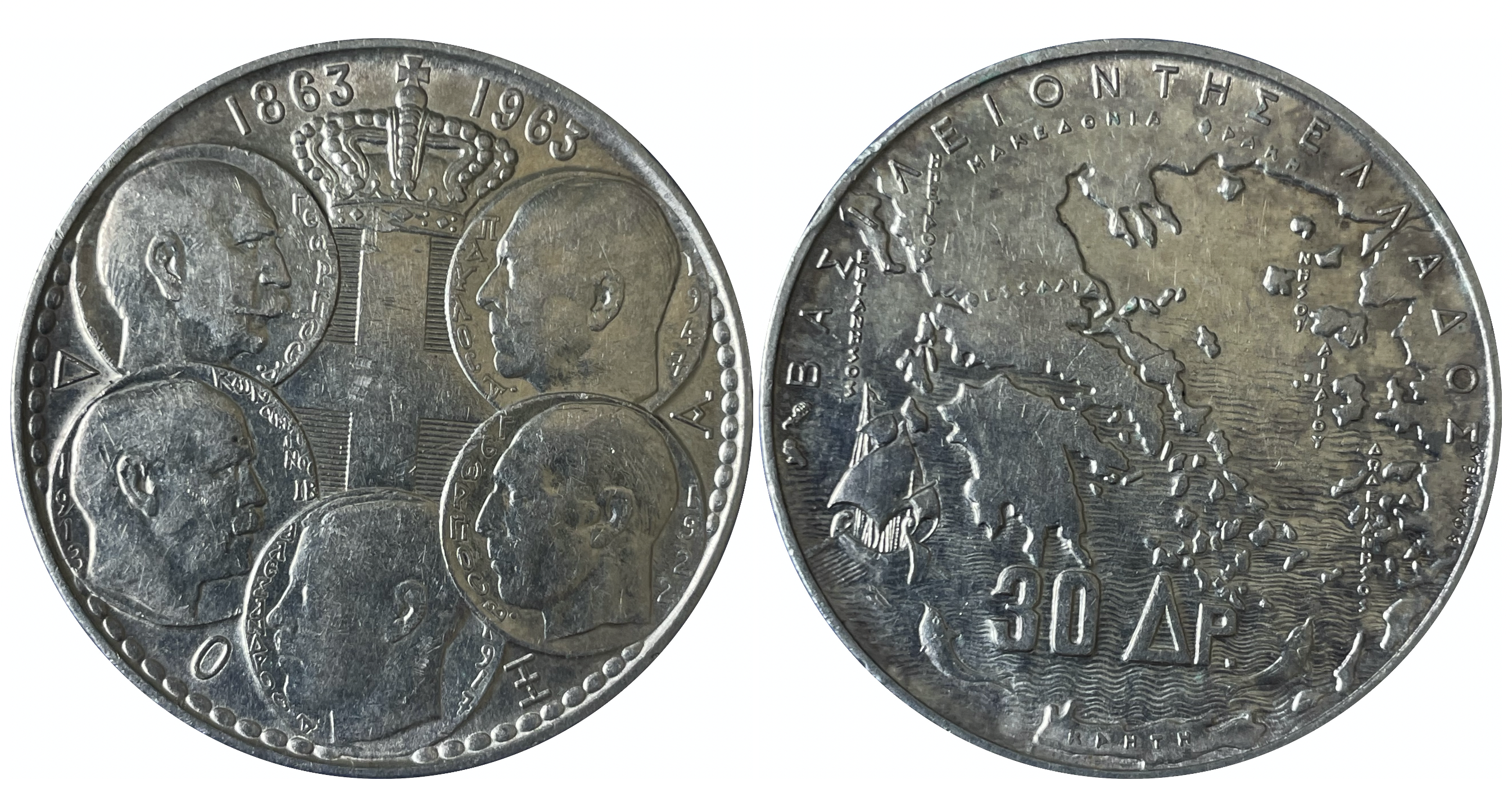
Thirty-drachma coin of 1963, commemorating the centennial of the reign of the House of Glücksburg. Clockwise from the top: Paul, George II, Alexander, Constantine I and George I.

In 1863 and with the name George I, Prince Wilhelm of Denmark was elected King of the Hellenes on the recommendation of Europe's Great Powers. He was the second son of King Christian IX of Denmark.

Portrait	Name	Life	Reign	Additional titles
	George I	1845–1913	1863–1913	Prince of Denmark; Prince of Schleswig-Holstein-Sonderburg-Glücksburg
	Constantine I	1868–1923	1913–1917; 1920–1922	Prince of Denmark
	Alexander	1893–1920	1917–1920	Prince of Denmark
	George II	1890–1947	1922–1924; 1935–1947	Prince of Denmark
	Paul	1901–1964	1947–1964	Prince of Denmark
	Constantine II	1940–2023	1964–1973	Prince of Denmark

The Hellenic constitutional monarchy was usurped in a coup d'état by a military junta in 1967 and the royal family fled into exile. The monarchy was abolished in 1973. After the collapse of the military dictatorship in 1974, 69.18% of votes recorded in a republic referendum were against the restoration of the monarchy.

As of 2024, the family has assumed the last name "De Grèce" (Ντε Γκρες; "of Greece"), first used by Greek author and dynast Prince Michael of Greece and Denmark for his pen name as Michel de Grèce, as the only one familiar to them.

== Norway ==
Coat of arms of the King of Norway

In 1905, Prince Carl of Denmark became Norway's first independent monarch in 518 years, taking the regnal name Haakon VII. His father was King Frederick VIII of Denmark, and one of his uncles was King George I of Greece.

Portrait	Name	Life	Reign	Additional titles
	Haakon VII	1872–1957	1905–1957	Prince of Denmark, Prince of Schleswig-Holstein-Sonderburg-Glücksburg
	Olav V	1903–1991	1957–1991	Prince of Denmark, Prince of Schleswig-Holstein-Sonderburg-Glücksburg, Olympic Sailing Champion
	Harald V	1937–2026	1991–2026	Prince of Schleswig-Holstein-Sonderburg-Glücksburg, Sailing World Champion
	Haakon VIII	born 1973	2026–present	

The heir apparent is Crown Princess Ingrid Alexandra of Norway (born 2004). See the present line of succession.

== United Kingdom ==
Arms of Prince Philip, Duke of Edinburgh

In 1947, Philip Mountbatten married Princess Elizabeth (later Queen Elizabeth II). Born into the house of Glücksburg as a prince of Denmark and Greece, he was the son of Prince Andrew of Greece. He later relinquished these titles and was made Duke of Edinburgh by his father-in-law, King George VI of the United Kingdom. In addition Philip took the surname "Mountbatten", an anglicized form of his mother's house name, Battenberg.

Portrait	Name	Life	Tenure	Additional titles
	Prince Philip, Duke of Edinburgh	1921–2021	1947–2021	Titles until 1947: Prince of Greece; Prince of Denmark; Titles from 1947: Duke of Edinburgh; Earl of Merioneth; Baron Greenwich

== Line of succession ==
House of Oldenburg Family Tree

King of the Kalmar Union (1457-1464, 1497-1501, 1520-1521)

King of Denmark-Norway (1524-1533, 1537-1814)

King of Denmark (1448-1533, 1534-present)

King of the Hellenes (1863-1924, 1935-1973)

King of Norway (1450-1481, 1483-1523, 1524-1533, 1537-1814, 1905-present)

King of the United Kingdom (1450-1481, 1483-1523, 1524-1533, 1537-1814, 1905-present)

House of Oldenburg
Elimar I Count of Oldenburg r. 1091-1108 c. 1040-1112
Elimar II; Count of Oldenburg r. 1108-1142
Christian I the Quarrelsome; Count of Oldenburg r. 1143-1167 ?-1167
Maurice; Count of Oldenburg r. 1169-1211 c. 1145-c. 1211
Christian II; Count of Oldenburg r. 1209-1233 ?-1233
John I Count of Oldenburg r. 1233-1270 c. 1204-c. 1270
Christian III; Count of Oldenburg r. 1270-1285 ?-1285
John II; Count of Oldenburg r. 1285-1301 ?-c. 1314/6
Conrad I Count of Oldenburg r. 1324-1347 ?-1347
Christian V Count of Oldenburg r. 1368-1398 c. 1342-c. 1399
Dietrich; Fortunatus; Count of Oldenburg r. 1403-1440; 1398-1440
Christian I King of Denmark r. 1448-1481; King of Norway r. 1450-1481; King of Sweden r. 1457-1464; 1426-1481
John; King of Denmark r. 1481-1513; King of Norway r. 1483-1513; King of Sweden r. 1497-1501; 1455-1513	Frederick I King of Denmark r. 1523-1533; King of Norway r. 1524-1533; 1471-1533
House of Schleswig- Holstein-Haderslev
Christian II; King of Denmark and Norway r. 1513-1523; King of Sweden r. 1520-1521; 1481-1559	Christian III; King of Denmark r. 1534-1559; King of Norway r. 1537-1559; 1503-1559	John the Elder; Duke of Schleswig- Holstein-Haderslev r. 1544-1580; 1521-1580	Adolf; Duke of Schleswig- Holstein-Gottorp r. 1544-1586; 1526-1586
House of Schleswig- Holstein-Gottorp
House of Schleswig- Holstein-Sonderburg
Frederick II; King of Denmark and Norway r. 1559-1588; 1534-1588	John the Younger; Duke of Schleswig- Holstein-Sonderburg r. 1564-1622; 1545-1622
House of Schleswig- Holstein-Sonderburg- Norburg	House of Schleswig- Holstein-Sonderburg- Plön
Christian IV; King of Denmark and Norway r. 1588-1648; 1577-1648	Alexander; Duke of Schleswig- Holstein-Sonderburg r. 1622-1627; 1573-1627	John Adolph; Duke of Schleswig- Holstein-Sonderburg- Norburg r. 1622-1624; 1576-1624	Frederick; Duke of Schleswig- Holstein-Sonderburg- Norburg r. 1624-1658; 1581-1658	Joachim Ernest I Duke of Schleswig- Holstein-Sonderburg- Plön r. 1622-1671; 1595-1671
House of Schleswig- Holstein-Sonderburg- Augustenburg	House of Schleswig- Holstein-Sonderburg- Beck	House of Schleswig- Holstein-Sonderburg- Plön-Rethwisch
Frederick III; King of Denmark and Norway r. 1648-1670; 1609-1670	John Christian; Duke of Schleswig- Holstein-Sonderburg r. 1627-1627; 1607-1653	Ernest Günther I Duke of Schleswig- Holstein-Sonderburg -Augustenburg r. 1627-1689; 1609-1689	August Philip; Duke of Schleswig- Holstein-Sonderburg- Beck r. 1646-1675; 1612-1675	John Bogislaw; Duke of Schleswig- Holstein-Sonderburg- Norburg r. 1658-1669; 1629-1669	Joachim Ernest II; Duke of Schleswig- Holstein-Sonderburg- Plön-Rethwisch r. 1671-1700; 1637-1700	John Adolphus; Duke of Schleswig- Holstein-Sonderburg- Plön r. 1671-1704; 1634-1704	Augustus; Duke of Schleswig- Holstein-Sonderburg- Plön-Norburg r. 1679-1699; 1635-1699
House of Schleswig- Holstein-Sonderburg- Franzhagen
Christian V King of Denmark and Norway r. 1670-1699; 1646-1699	Christian Adolf I Duke of Schleswig- Holstein-Sonderburg r. 1653-1668; Duke of Schleswig- Holstein-Sonderburg- Franzhagen r. 1676-1702; 1641-1702	Frederick; Duke of Schleswig- Holstein-Sonderburg -Augustenburg r. 1689-1692; 1652-1692	Ernest August; Duke of Schleswig- Holstein-Sonderburg -Augustenburg r. 1692-1731; 1660-1731	Frederick William; 1668-1714	August; Duke of Schleswig- Holstein-Sonderburg- Beck r. 1675-1689; 1652-1689	Frederick Louis; Duke of Schleswig- Holstein-Sonderburg- Beck r. 1719-1728; 1653-1728	John Ernest; Ferdinand; Duke of Schleswig- Holstein-Sonderburg- Plön-Rethwisch r. 1700-1729; 1684-1729	Adolphus Augustus; 1680-1704	Joachim Frederick; Duke of Schleswig- Holstein-Sonderburg- Plön r. 1706-1722; 1668-1722	Christian Charles; 1674-1706
Frederick IV; King of Denmark and Norway r. 1699-1730; 1671-1730	Christian Leopold; Duke of Schleswig- Holstein-Sonderburg- Franzhagen r. 1702-1707; 1678-1707	Louis Charles; Duke of Schleswig- Holstein-Sonderburg- Franzhagen r. 1707; 1684-1707	Christian August I Duke of Schleswig- Holstein-Sonderburg -Augustenburg r. 1731-1754; 1696-1754	Frederick William I Duke of Schleswig- Holstein-Sonderburg- Beck r. 1689-1719; 1682-1719	Frederick William II; Duke of Schleswig- Holstein-Sonderburg- Beck r. 1728-1749; 1687-1749	Charles Louis; Duke of Schleswig- Holstein-Sonderburg- Beck r. 1757-1774; 1690-1774	Peter August; Duke of Schleswig- Holstein-Sonderburg- Beck r. 1774-1775; 1697-1775	Leopold Augustus; Duke of Schleswig- Holstein-Sonderburg- Plön r. 1704-1706; 1702-1706	Frederick Charles; Duke of Schleswig- Holstein-Sonderburg- Plön r. 1722-1761; 1706-1761
Christian VI; King of Denmark and Norway r. 1730-1746; 1699-1746	Christian Adolf II; Duke of Schleswig- Holstein-Sonderburg- Franzhagen r. 1707-1709; 1707-1709	Frederick Christian I Duke of Schleswig- Holstein-Sonderburg -Augustenburg r. 1754-1794; 1721-1794	Frederick William III; Duke of Schleswig- Holstein-Sonderburg- Beck r. 1749-1757; 1723-1757	Charles Anthony; August; 1727-1759
Frederick V King of Denmark and Norway r. 1746-1766; 1723-1766	Frederick Christian II; Duke of Schleswig- Holstein-Sonderburg -Augustenburg r. 1794-1814; 1765-1814	Frederick Charles; Louis; Duke of Schleswig- Holstein-Sonderburg- Beck r. 1775-1816; 1757-1816
House of Schleswig- Holstein-Sonderburg- Glücksburg
Christian VII; King of Denmark and Norway r. 1766-1808; 1749-1808	Frederick; Regent of Denmark- Norway; 1772-1784; 1753-1805	Christian August II; Duke of Schleswig- Holstein-Sonderburg -Augustenburg r. 1814-1863; 1798-1869	Frederick William; Duke of Schleswig- Holstein-Sonderburg- Beck r. 1816-1825; Duke of Schleswig- Holstein-Sonderburg- Glücksburg r. 1825-1831; 1785-1831
Danish Royal Family
Frederick VI; King of Denmark r. 1808-1839; King of Norway r. 1808-1814; 1768-1839	Christian VIII; King of Denmark r. 1839-1848; King of Norway r. 1814; 1786-1848	Frederick VIII; Duke of Schleswig- Holstein r. 1863-1880; 1829-1880	Christian; House of Schleswig-Holstein-Sonderburg-Augustenburg; 1831-1917	Charles; Duke of Schleswig- Holstein-Sonderburg- Glücksburg r. 1831-1878; 1813-1878	Frederick; Duke of Schleswig- Holstein-Sonderburg- Glücksburg r. 1878-1885; 1814-1885	Christian IX; King of Denmark r. 1863-1906; 1818-1906
Greek Royal Family
Frederick VII; King of Denmark r. 1848-1863; 1808-1863	Ernst Günther II; Duke of Schleswig-Holstein r. 1880-1921; 1863-1921	Albert; Duke of Schleswig- Holstein r. 1921-1931; 1869-1931	Frederick Ferdinand; Duke of Schleswig-Holstein r. 1885-1934; 1855-1934	Frederick VIII; King of Denmark r. 1906-1912; 1843-1912	George I King of the Hellenes r. 1863-1913; 1845-1913
Norwegian Royal Family
William Frederick; Duke of Schleswig-Holstein r. 1934-1965; 1891-1965	Christian X King of Denmark r. 1912-1947; King of Iceland r. 1918-1944; 1870-1947	Haakon VII; King of Norway r. 1905-1957; 1872-1957	Constantine I King of the Hellenes r. 1913-1917, 1920-1922; 1868-1923	Andrew; Prince of Greece and Denmark; 1882-1944
House of Mountbatten-Windsor
Peter Frederick; Duke of Schleswig-Holstein r. 1965-1980; 1922-1980	Frederick IX; King of Denmark r. 1947-1972; 1899-1972	Olav V King of Norway r. 1957-1991; 1903-1991	George II; King of the Hellenes r. 1922-1924, 1935-1947; 1890-1947	Alexander; King of the Hellenes r. 1917-1920; 1893-1920	Paul; King of the Hellenes r. 1947-1964; 1901-1964	Philip; Duke of Edinburgh; 1921-2021
Christopher; Duke of Schleswig-Holstein r. 1980-2023; 1949-2023	Margrethe II; Queen of Denmark r. 1972-2024; 1940-present	Harald V King of Norway r. 1991-2026; 1937-2026	Constantine II; King of the Hellenes r. 1964-1973; 1940-2023	Charles III; King of the United Kingdom r. 2022-present 1948-present House of Windsor

By agnatic primogeniture:

- Frederick I of Denmark (1471–1533)
  - Christian III of Denmark (1503–1559)
    - John II, Duke of Schleswig-Holstein-Sonderburg (1545–1622)
      - Alexander, Duke of Schleswig-Holstein-Sonderburg (1573–1627)
        - August Philipp, Duke of Schleswig-Holstein-Sonderburg-Beck (1612–1675)
          - Frederick Louis, Duke of Schleswig-Holstein-Sonderburg-Beck (1653–1728)
            - Peter August, Duke of Schleswig-Holstein-Sonderburg-Beck (1697–1775)
              - Prince Karl Anton August of Schleswig-Holstein-Sonderburg-Beck (1727–1759)
                - Friedrich Karl Ludwig, Duke of Schleswig-Holstein-Sonderburg-Beck (1757–1816)
                  - Friedrich Wilhelm, Duke of Schleswig-Holstein-Sonderburg-Glücksburg (1785–1831)
                    - Friedrich, Duke of Schleswig-Holstein-Sonderburg-Glücksburg (1814–1885)
                      - Friedrich Ferdinand, Duke of Schleswig-Holstein (1855–1934)
                        - Wilhelm Friedrich, Duke of Schleswig-Holstein (1891–1965)
                          - Peter, Duke of Schleswig-Holstein (1922–1980)
                            - Christoph, Prince of Schleswig-Holstein (1949–2023)
                              - Friedrich Ferdinand, Prince of Schleswig-Holstein (born 1985)
                                - (1) Prince Alfred of Schleswig-Holstein
                                - (2) Prince Albert of Schleswig-Holstein
                              - (3) Prince Constantin of Schleswig-Holstein (b. 1986)
                                - (4) Prince Tassilo of Schleswig-Holstein, Prince of Lyxborg
                              - (5) Prince Leopold of Schleswig-Holstein (b. 1991)
                            - (6) Prince Alexander of Schleswig-Holstein (b. 1953)
                              - (7) Prince Julian of Schleswig-Holstein (b. 1997)
                    - Christian IX of Denmark (1818–1906)
                      - Frederick VIII of Denmark (1843–1912)
                        - Christian X of Denmark (1870–1947)
                          - Knud, Hereditary Prince of Denmark (1900–1976)
                            - (8) Count Ingolf of Rosenborg (b. 1940)
                        - Haakon VII of Norway (1872–1957)
                          - Olav V of Norway (1903–1991)
                            - Harald V of Norway (1937–2026)
                              - (9) Haakon VIII of Norway (b. 1973)
                                - (10) Prince Sverre Magnus of Norway (b. 2005)
                        - Prince Harald of Denmark (1876–1949)
                          - Count Oluf of Rosenborg (1923–1990)
                            - (11) Count Ulrik of Rosenborg (b. 1950)
                              - (12) Count Philip of Rosenborg (b. 1986)
                      - George I of Greece (1845–1913)
                        - Constantine I of Greece (1868–1923)
                          - Paul of Greece (1901–1964)
                            - Constantine II of Greece (1940–2023)
                              - (13) Pavlos, Crown Prince of Greece (b. 1967)
                                - (14) Prince Constantine Alexios of Greece and Denmark (b. 1998)
                                - (15) Prince Achileas-Andreas of Greece and Denmark (b. 2000)
                                - (16) Prince Odysseas Kimon of Greece and Denmark (b. 2004)
                                - (17) Prince Aristide Stavros of Greece and Denmark (b. 2008)
                              - (18) Prince Nikolaos of Greece and Denmark (b. 1969)
                              - (19) Prince Philippos of Greece and Denmark (b. 1986)
                                - (20) Prince Kimon Thomas Konstantinos of Greece and Denmark (b. 2026)
                        - Prince Andrew of Greece and Denmark (1882–1944)
                          - Prince Philip, Duke of Edinburgh (1921–2021)
                            - (21) Charles III of the United Kingdom (b. 1948)
                              - (22) William, Prince of Wales (b. 1982)
                                - (23) Prince George of Wales (b. 2013)
                                - (24) Prince Louis of Wales (b. 2018)
                              - (25) Prince Harry, Duke of Sussex (b. 1984)
                                - (26) Prince Archie of Sussex (b. 2019)
                            - (27) Andrew Mountbatten-Windsor (b. 1960)
                            - (28) Prince Edward, Duke of Edinburgh (b. 1964)
                              - (29) James Mountbatten-Windsor, Earl of Wessex (b. 2007)
                      - Prince Valdemar of Denmark (1858–1939)
                        - Prince Axel of Denmark (1888–1964)
                          - Count Flemming of Rosenborg (1922–2002)
                            - (30) Count Axel of Rosenborg (b. 1950)
                              - (31) Count Carl Johan of Rosenborg (b. 1979)
                                - (32)Count Valdemar of Rosenborg (b. 2014)
                              - (33) Count Alexander Flemming of Rosenborg (b. 1993)
                            - (34) Count Birger of Rosenborg (b. 1950)
                            - (35) Count Carl Johan of Rosenborg (b. 1952)
                        - Prince Erik, Count of Rosenborg (1890–1950)
                          - Count Christian of Rosenborg (1932–1997)
                            - (36) Count Valdemar of Rosenborg (b. 1965)
                              - (37) Count Nicolai of Rosenborg (b. 1997)
  - Adolf, Duke of Holstein-Gottorp (1526–1586)
    - John Adolf, Duke of Holstein-Gottorp (1575–1616)
      - Frederick III, Duke of Holstein-Gottorp (1597–1659)
        - Christian Albert, Duke of Holstein-Gottorp (1641–1695)
          - Frederick IV, Duke of Holstein-Gottorp (1671–1702)
            - Charles Frederick, Duke of Holstein-Gottorp (1700–1739)
              - Peter III of Russia (1728–1762)
                - Paul I of Russia (1754–1801)
                  - Nicholas I of Russia (1796–1855)
                    - Alexander II of Russia (1818–1881)
                      - Grand Duke Paul Alexandrovich of Russia (1860–1919)
                        - Grand Duke Dmitri Pavlovich of Russia (1891–1941)
                          - Prince Paul Dimitrievich Romanovsky-Ilyinsky (1928–2004)
                            - (38) Prince Dimitri Pavlovich Romanovsky-Ilyinsky (b. 1954)
                            - (39) Prince Michael Pavlovich Romanovsky-Ilyinsky (b. 1961)
                    - Grand Duke Michael Nicolaevich of Russia (1832–1909)
                      - Grand Duke Alexander Mikhailovich of Russia (1866–1933)
                        - Prince Andrei Alexandrovich of Russia (1897–1981)
                          - Andrew Andreevich, Prince of Russia (1923–2021)
                            - (40) Alexis Andreevich, Prince of Russia (b. 1953)
                            - (41) Prince Peter Andreevich of Russia (b. 1961)
                            - (42) Prince Andrew Andreevich of Russia (b. 1963)
                        - Prince Rostislav Alexandrovich of Russia (1902–1978)
                          - Prince Rostislav Rostislavovich of Russia (1938–1999)
                            - (43) Prince Rostislav Rostislavovich of Russia (b. 1985)
                            - (44) Prince Nikita Rostislavovich of Russia (b. 1987)
                          - Prince Nicholas Rostislavovich of Russia (1945–2000)
                            - (45) Prince Nicholas Nicolaevich of Russia (b. 1968)
                            - (46) Prince Daniel Nicolaevich of Russia (b. 1972)
                              - (47) Prince Jackson Danielovich of Russia (b. 2009)
          - Prince Christian August of Holstein-Gottorp (1673–1726)
            - Prince Georg Ludwig of Holstein-Gottorp (1719–1763)
              - Peter I, Grand Duke of Oldenburg (1755–1829)
                - Augustus, Grand Duke of Oldenburg (1783–1853)
                  - Peter II, Grand Duke of Oldenburg (1827–1900)
                    - Frederick Augustus II, Grand Duke of Oldenburg (1852–1931)
                      - Nikolaus, Hereditary Grand Duke of Oldenburg (1897–1970)
                        - Anton-Günther, Duke of Oldenburg (1923–2014)
                          - (48) Christian, Duke of Oldenburg (b. 1955)
                            - (49) Duke Alexander of Oldenburg (b. 1990)
                            - (50) Duke Philipp of Oldenburg (b. 1991)
                            - (51) Duke Anton Friedrich of Oldenburg (b. 1993)
                        - Duke Peter of Oldenburg (1926–2016)
                          - (52) Duke Nikolaus of Oldenburg (b. 1955)
                            - (53) Duke Christoph of Oldenburg (b. 1985)
                            - (54) Duke Georg of Oldenburg (b. 1990)
                            - (55) Duke Oscar of Oldenburg (b. 1991)
                        - Duke Friedrich August of Oldenburg (1936–2017)
                          - (56) Duke Paul-Wladimir of Oldenburg (b. 1969)
                            - (57) Duke Kirill of Oldenburg (b. 2002)
                            - (58) Duke Carlos of Oldenburg (b. 2004)
                            - (59) Duke Paul of Oldenburg (b. 2005)
                        - (60) Duke Huno of Oldenburg (b. 1940)
                        - (61) Duke Johann of Oldenburg (b. 1940)
                          - (62) Duke Konstantin Nikolaus of Oldenburg (b. 1975)

Royal House House of Glücksburg
Preceded by House of Holstein-Gottorp	Ruling House of Duchy of Schleswig; 1773–1864	Duchy Abolished
Preceded by House of Oldenburg	Ruling House of Denmark (agnatic) (non-agnatic from 2024); 1863–2024	Succeeded by House of Monpezat
Preceded by House of Wittelsbach	Ruling House of Greece; 1863–1924	Monarchy Abolished
Preceded by Republic	Ruling House of Greece; 1935–1974	Monarchy Abolished
Preceded by House of Bernadotte	Ruling House of Norway; 1905–present	Incumbent
Preceded by House of Windsor	Ruling House of the United Kingdom (agnatic); 2022–present	Incumbent
