= Anna Karolina Orzelska =

Polish noblewoman (1707–1769)

- Countess Orzelska; Princess of Schleswig-Holstein-Sonderburg-Beck
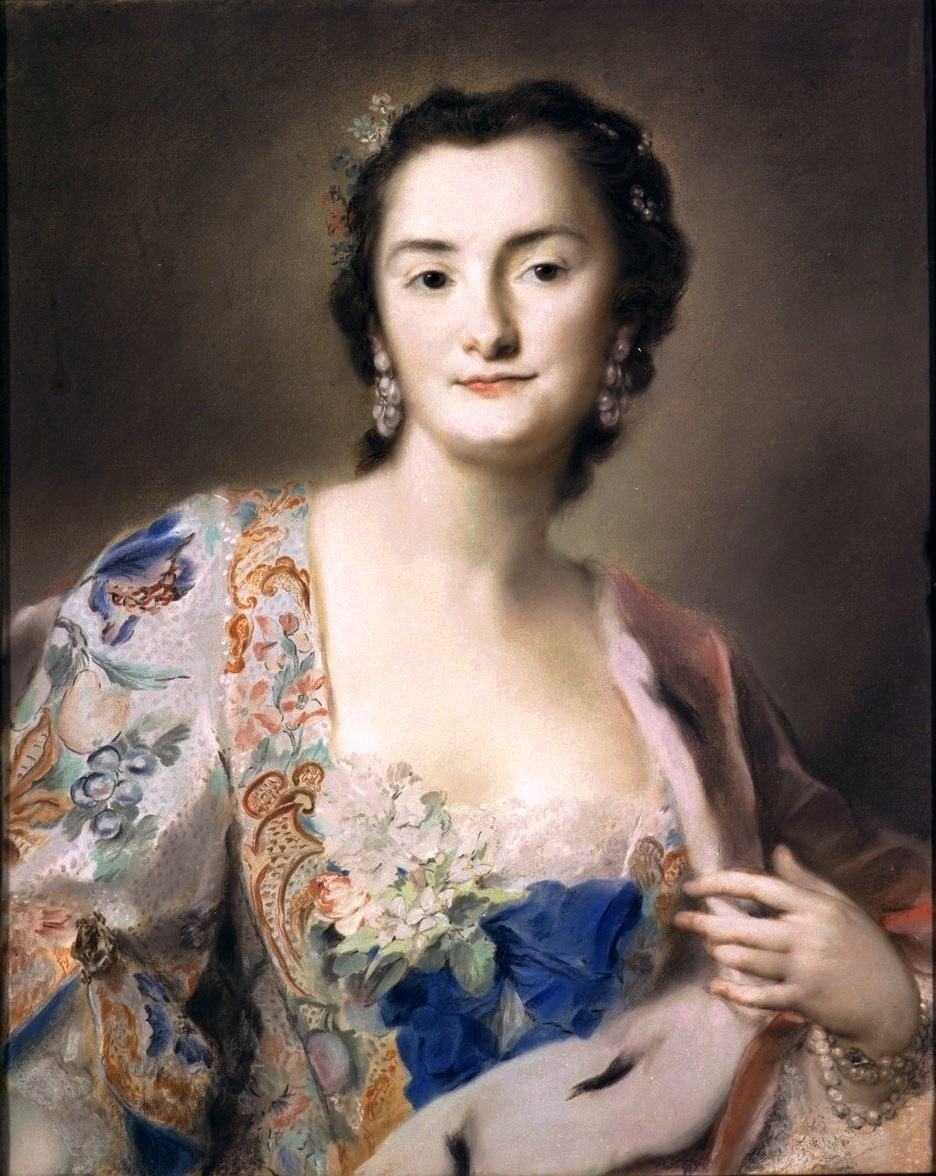
- Portrait by Rosalba Carriera (1730)
- Born: 23 November 1707; Warsaw, Poland
- Died: 27 September 1769 (aged 61); Grenoble, France
- Burial: Saint-Louis Church
- Spouse: Charles Louis, Duke of Schleswig-Holstein-Sonderburg-Beck (m. 1730–div. 1733)
- Issue: Charles Frederick, Hereditary Prince of Schleswig-Holstein-Sonderburg-Beck
Names
- Anna Karolina Orzelska
- House: Wettin (by birth); Schleswig-Holstein-Sonderburg-Beck (by marriage)
- Father: Augustus II of Poland
- Mother: Henriette Rénard

Anna Karolina Orzelska (23 November 1707 – 27 September 1769) was a Polish szlachcianka (noblewoman) and an adventuress. Born as an illegitimate daughter of August II the Strong, Elector of Saxony, King of Poland and Grand Duke of Lithuania, by Henriette Rénard she became Hereditary Duchess of Schleswig-Holstein-Sonderburg-Beck by marriage.

== Life ==
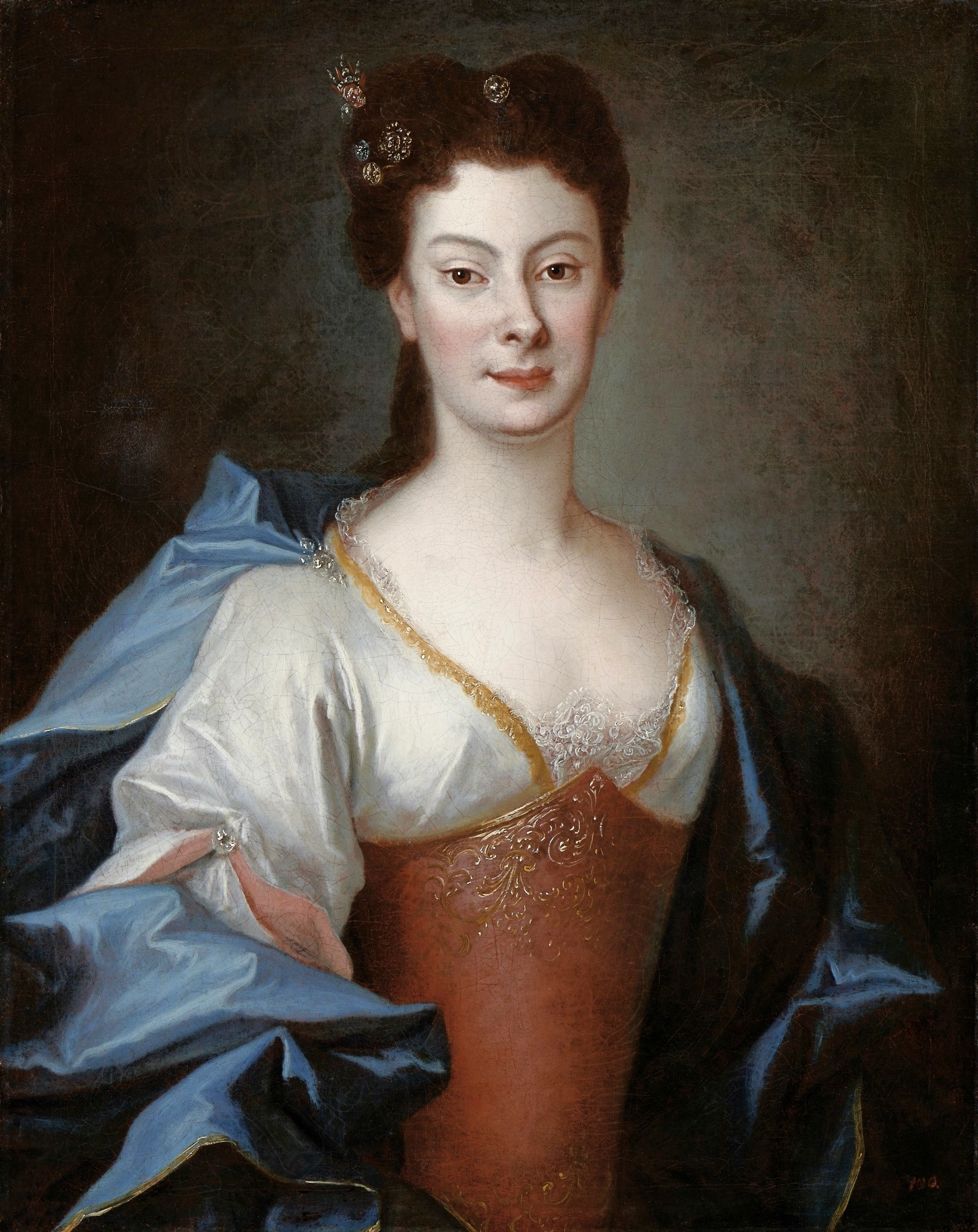
Anna Orzelska by Louis de Silvestre, 1724.

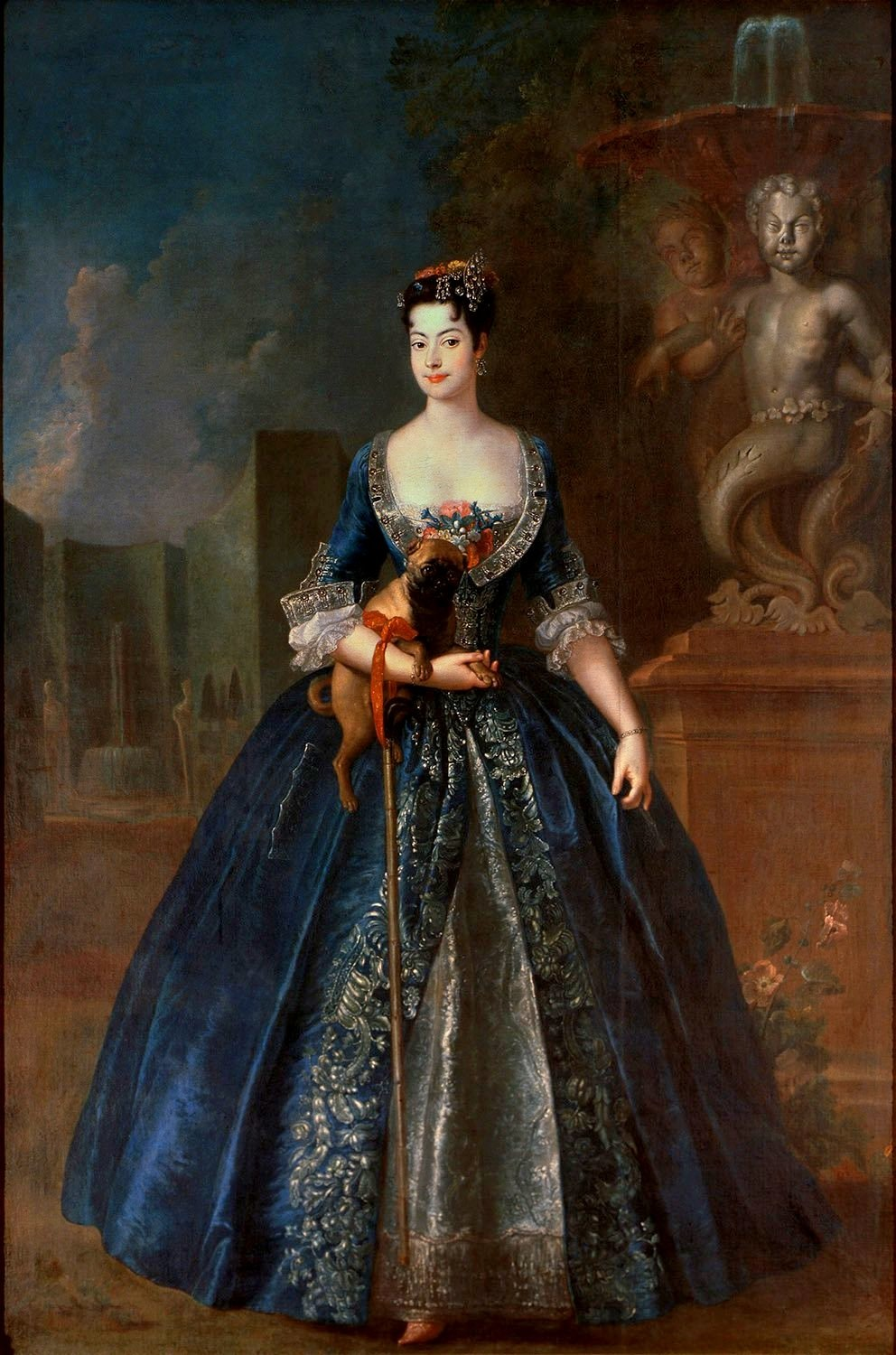
Anna Orzelska in the gardens of the Blue Palace at Warsaw, by Antoine Pesne, c. 1728.

The King-Elector August II the Strong met Henriette Rénard in Warsaw in 1706, where her father André Rénard, a wine merchant from Lyon, had a salon. Most historians agree that at first, Henriette didn't know the true identity of her lover. As a result of the liaison, in November 1707 a daughter was born, Anna Karolina. August did not learn of her existence until a year and a half later. Henriette married the Paris businessman François Drian shortly after Anna Karolina's birth and moved to France, where she grew up.

For a long time, the girl lived in Paris with her mother in complete obscurity without the support of her father. However, in 1723, her half-brother, the later Count Frederick Augustus Rutowsky, found her. Anna Karolina followed him on his return to the Dresden court, where the sixteen-year-old beauty was presented to the King. On 19 September 1724, August the Strong officially acknowledged Anna Karolina as his daughter and gave her the title of Countess Orzelska (Polish: Hrabina Orzelska, German: Gräfin Orzelska).

The first time she appeared in documents was on 21 November 1726 during the Diet of Grodno, at which the King personally signed the donation of the Blue Palace to her, which became Anna Karolina's official residence.

Anna Karolina became one of Augustus's most beloved children due to her beauty and resemblance to her father. Without formal intellectual training, she nevertheless proved to be useful in court life.

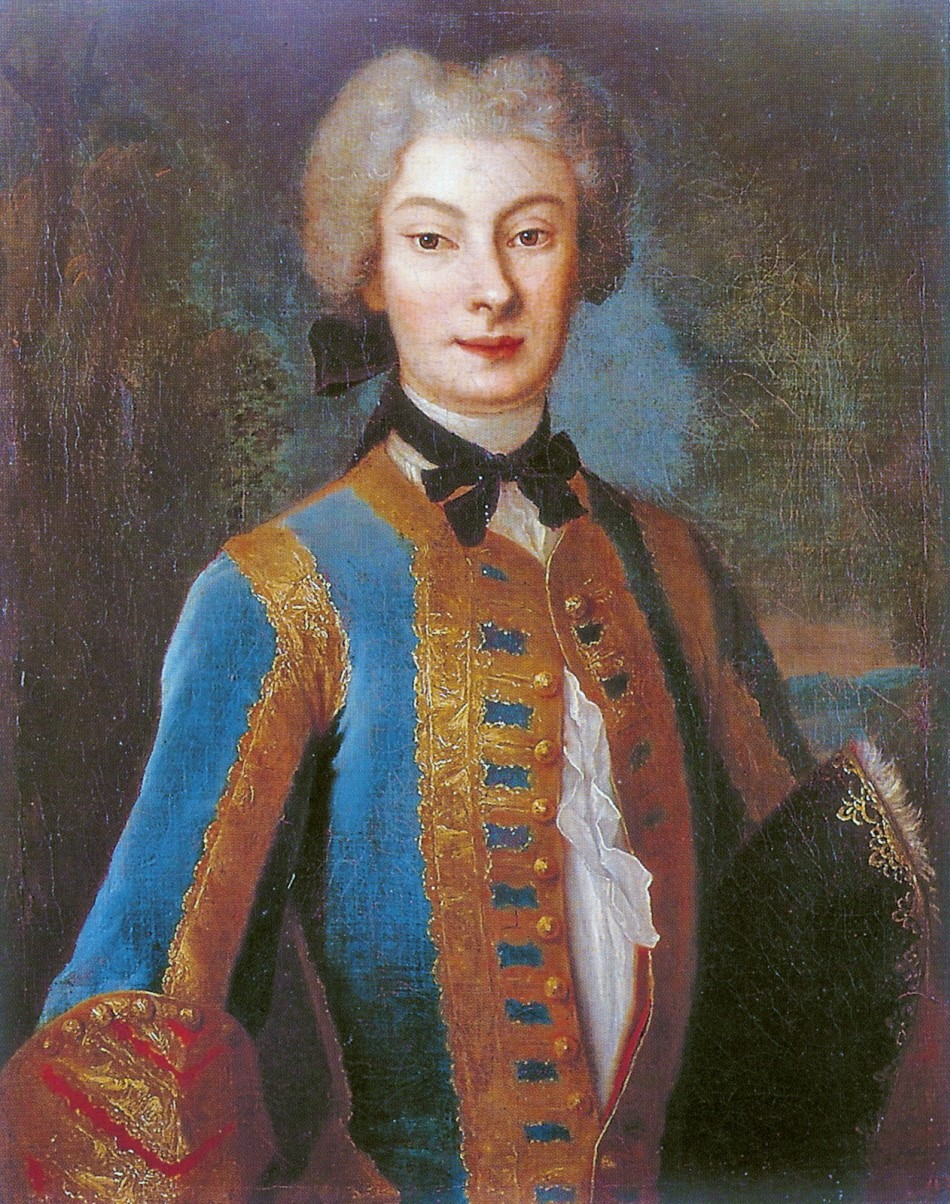
Anna Orzelska in riding habit by Louis de Silvestre, 1730.

The court of August the Strong had the worst reputation in Europe and encouraged the Countess's behavior, which was considered scandalous according to the official moral of the time. Contemporaries noted her tendency to drink, smoke tobacco, and have numerous affairs. Anna excelled in riding, hunting, and dancing. The Countess frequently appeared in men's clothing and even in military uniform. Some sources alleged that August the Strong made his own daughter his mistress; however, this cannot be proved.

In 1728, while King Frederick Wilhelm I of Prussia was visiting Dresden, the Countess Orzelska met his son, the sixteen-year-old Crown Prince Frederick (the future Frederick II the Great). Some have claimed that she became the first (and, probably, the only) mistress of Frederick's life - claims based more on the wishful thinking of his sister Wilhelmine who didn't like her brother's homosexual liaisons with young pages. The Crown Prince dedicated verses and musical works of his own composition to her. However, when Augustus and the Countess, who was now married and pregnant, paid a return visit to the Prussian court, Frederick was frustrated and turned to unspecified other forms of dissipation. Some have even suggested that Orzelska, during her alleged liaison with Frederick, attempted to gather intelligence on him and Prussia. However, Frederick was still a teenager at that time and his father was in charge in Prussia.

In 1730 she received a dowry of 300,000 thalers from her father and, on 10 August, married Prince Charles Louis of Schleswig-Holstein-Sonderburg-Beck in Dresden. He was the younger brother of the reigning duke, Frederick William II, Duke of Schleswig-Holstein-Sonderburg-Beck. The couple had one son, Karl Frederick (born in Dresden on 5 January 1732; died in Strasbourg on 21 February 1772), who later served as a Generalmajor in the Saxon Army. Charles Louis assumed the ducal title only after their divorce.

However, after three years of unhappy marriage (1733), Orzelska requested a divorce; from this moment, the couple began to live separately: Karl Ludwig in Königsberg and Anna Karolina in Venice, where she had a scandalous lifestyle.

She died in the French city of Grenoble aged 61, and was buried in the Church of Saint-Louis, in the Chapel of Saint-Jean-Baptiste.

== See also ==
- Saxon Garden
- Elżbieta Sieniawska
- Sexuality of Frederick the Great
