= Frederick William II of Schleswig-Holstein-Sonderburg-Beck =

Frederick William II
- Duke of Schleswig-Holstein-Sonderburg-Beck
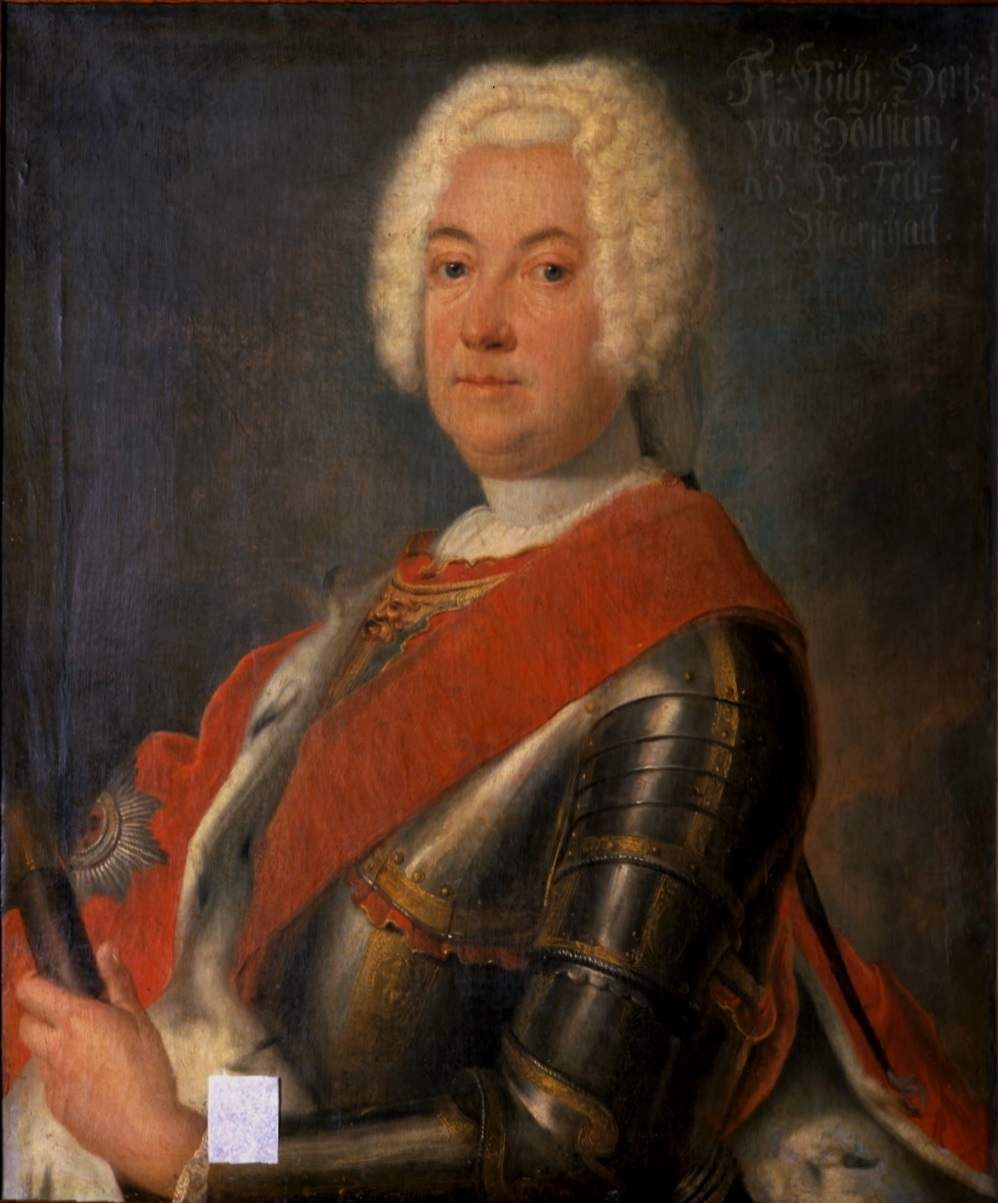
- Reign: 1728–1749
- Born: 18 June 1687; Potsdam, Brandenburg
- Died: 11 November 1749 (aged 62); Königsberg, Prussia
- Spouse: Louise Felicitas Eleonora of Loß; Ursula Anna of Dohna-Schlobitten
- House: Schleswig-Holstein-Sonderburg-Beck
- Father: Frederick Louis, Duke of Schleswig-Holstein-Sonderburg-Beck
- Mother: Louise Charlotte of Schleswig-Holstein-Sonderburg-Augustenburg

Frederick William II, Duke of Schleswig-Holstein-Sonderburg-Beck (18 June 1687 – 11 November 1749) was a Duke of Schleswig-Holstein-Sonderburg-Beck. He served as Prussian field marshal and was appointed Governor of Berlin, but never filled the latter position.

Frederick William II was the eldest son of Duke Frederick Louis (1653–1728) and his wife Louise Charlotte of Schleswig-Holstein-Sonderburg-Augustenburg (1658–1740). His siblings included Dorothea, Peter August and Charles Louis. In 1728, Frederick William II succeeded his father as Duke of Schleswig-Holstein-Beck. After his death, he was succeeded by his son Frederick William III, who fell in battle in 1757. The title was then inherited by Frederick William II's brother, Charles Louis.

== Life ==
Although he was born in Potsdam, Frederick William was raised in Königsberg and studied in Halle. He served in the Prussian Army as a captain in his father's regiment in 1703 and as a lieutenant colonel in 1704. He distinguished himself during the Siege of Stralsund (1711–1715) and was promoted to colonel in 1713, when he served in the Regiment Holstein. In 1717, King Frederick William I of Prussia rewarded him with Friedrichshof Palace in Ludwigswalde, East Prussia (now in Lesnoye, Kaliningrad Oblast, Russia). In 1719 the king granted the duke another East Prussian manor, also named Friedrichshof, in Kasebalk. Duke Fredrick William subsequently renamed the second manor Holstein (now in Pregolskiy, Kaliningrad). From 1721, he led the infantry regiment #11, which his father had led before.

In 1725, the king invested the duke with the Riesenberg estate, however, he sold it off. In 1732, he purchased Haus Beck, near Ulenburg, Minden-Ravensberg, after which the Schleswig-Holstein-Sonderburg-Beck line was named, from Duchess Maria Antonia, the widow of his cousin Frederick William I, who had converted to Catholicism and had become a field marshal in the Army of the Holy Roman Empire. Frederick William I fell in the Battle of Francavilla, at Francavilla di Sicilia, Sicily.

In 1733 Frederick William II was promoted to lieutenant general. He participated in campaigns along the Rhine in 1734 and 1735 during the War of the Polish Succession. King Frederick II of Prussia was displeased with Frederick William after the Battle of Mollwitz during the First Silesian War in 1741. His regiment had been held in reserve and arrived on the battlefield too late to contribute to the battle. Unaware of the situation, he passed by several Austrian units. Nevertheless, King Frederick the Great was fond of the duke, whom he referred to as gute alte Holsteiner ("good old Holsteiner"). The duke was promoted to field marshal later that year and posted in Königsberg, the capital of East Prussia. He was also a recipient of the Order of the Black Eagle.

In 1745, Frederick William II re-sold Haus Beck in North Rhine-Westphalia to Magdalena Dorothea, Baroness von Ledebur-Königsbrück, née von Nagel zu Wallenbrück (d. 1750), but retained the title Duke of Schleswig-Holstein-Sonderburg-Beck, although in name only, without an allodial estate. In 1747, he was appointed governor of Berlin. However, due to illness, he was unable to take up this post. He died in Königsberg, on 11 Nov 1749, at the age of 62.

== Marriage and issue ==
Frederick William was married twice:

1) His first wife was Louise Felicitas Eleonora of Loß, Countess of Dabrova (d. 1715). She was the widow of a Prince Antoni Dominik Czartoryski (1673-1695) and a daughter of the Polish treasurer Wladislav of Loß, Duke of Marienborg and his Swedish wife, Baroness Barbara Gyllenstierna. This marriage remained childless.

2) He married his second wife on 3 December 1721. She was Countess Ursula Anna of Dohna-Schlodien (31 December 1700 – 17 March 1761), the daughter of Burgrave Christopher I, Burgrave and Count of Dohna-Schlodien and his wife, Friederike Marie, Countess of Dohna. This marriage produced two children:

- Frederick William III (4 November 1723 – 6 May 1757), served as a colonel in the Prussian army and fell in the Battle of Prague
- Sophia Charlotte (31 December 1722 – 7 August 1763), married:
  1. on 5 June 1738 to the Prussian Major General Alexander Emilius, Burgrave of Dohna-Wartenberg-Schlodien (7 July 1704 – 6 October 1745, fell in the Battle of Soor)
  2. on 1 January 1750 to Duke George Louis of Schleswig-Holstein-Gottorp (16 March 1719 – 1763)

== Ancestors ==
Ancestors of Frederick William II of Schleswig-Holstein-Sonderburg-Beck

8. Alexander, Duke of Schleswig-Holstein-Sonderburg
4. August Philipp, Duke of Schleswig-Holstein-Sonderburg-Beck
9. Dorothea of Schwarzburg-Sondershausen
2. Frederick Louis, Duke of Schleswig-Holstein-Sonderburg-Beck
10. William Louis, Count of Nassau-Saarbrücken
5. Marie Sibylle of Nassau-Saarbrücken
11. Anna Amalia of Baden-Durlach
1. Frederick William II, Duke of Schleswig-Holstein-Sonderburg-Beck
12. Alexander, Duke of Schleswig-Holstein-Sonderburg (= 8)
6. Ernest Günther, Duke of Schleswig-Holstein-Sonderburg-Augustenburg
13. Dorothea of Schwarzburg-Sondershausen (= 9)
3. Louise Charlotte of Schleswig-Holstein-Sonderburg-Augustenburg
14. Philip, Duke of Schleswig-Holstein-Sonderburg-Glücksburg
7. Augusta of Schleswig-Holstein-Sonderburg-Glücksburg
15. Sophie Hedwig of Saxe-Lauenburg

== Notes ==
Frederick William II of Schleswig-Holstein-Sonderburg-Beck House of Oldenburg Born: 18 June 1687 Died: 11 November 1749
Preceded by Frederick Louis	Duke of Schleswig-Holstein-Sonderburg-Beck; 1728–1749	Succeeded by Frederick William III
