= Peter August, Duke of Schleswig-Holstein-Sonderburg-Beck =

Duke of Schleswig-Holstein-Sonderburg-Beck

Peter August
- Duke of Schleswig-Holstein-Sonderburg-Beck
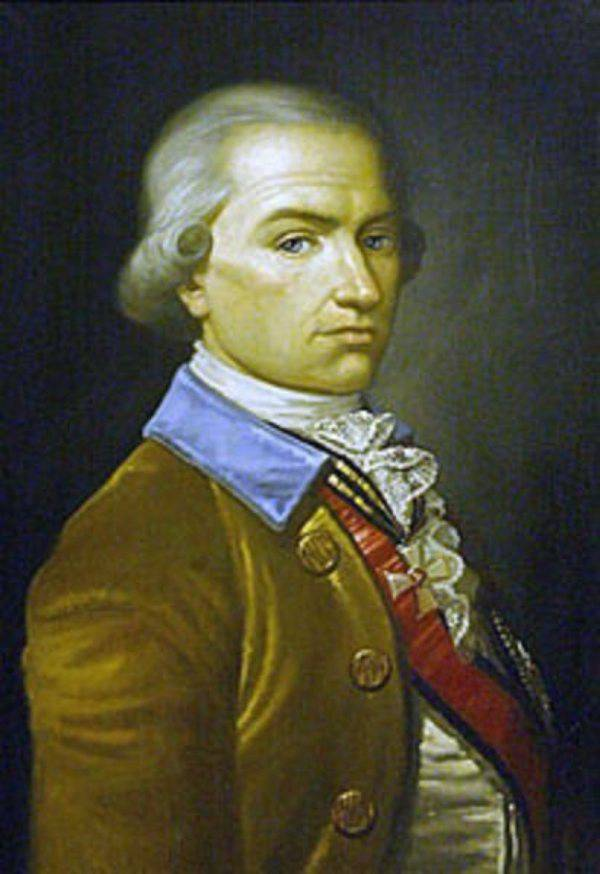
- 18th-century portrait
- Reign: 22 September 1774 – 24 February 1775
- Born: 7 December 1697; Königsberg, Prussia
- Died: 22 March 1775 (aged 77); Reval, Russia
- Spouse: Sophie; Countess Natalia Nikolaievna Golovina
- Issue: Karl Anton August; Catherine
Names
- Peter Augustus Frederick; German: Peter August Friedrich
- House: Schleswig-Holstein-Sonderburg-Beck
- Father: Frederick Louis, Duke of Schleswig-Holstein-Sonderburg-Beck
- Mother: Louise Charlotte

Peter August Friedrich, Duke of Schleswig-Holstein-Sonderburg-Beck (7 December 1697 – 22 March 1775) was a Duke of Schleswig-Holstein-Sonderburg-Beck.

== Early life ==
Born in Königsberg, Duchy of Prussia, as the fifth and youngest son of Frederick Louis, Duke of Schleswig-Holstein-Sonderburg-Beck and his wife, Duchess Louise Charlotte of Schleswig-Holstein-Sonderburg-Augustenburg. He was named after the Russian tsar Peter the Great, who stood by proxy as his godfather after Duke Frederick asked him to do so. It was one of the first family ties established between the Eastern Orthodox Romanov dynasty and Protestant rulers of Europe, predating the German marriages of Peter's own children and nieces.

== Army career ==
Peter August became Governor General of Reval (Tallinn), Governor of Estonia, in the Russian Empire, and a Field Marshal in the Russian Imperial Army. He died in Reval.

== Biography ==
He was only the titular duke, because he did not inherit the Haus Beck, Ulenburg, Herford and the domain that belonged to this line of the family. It had been inherited by his father's older brother, Duke August (1652–1689), and nephew Frederick William I (1682–1719), and was then sold by the latter's widow, Duchess Antoinette Josefa Isnardi di Castello (1692–1762) to Peter August's older brother, Duke Frederick William II (1687–1749), in 1732. But he re-sold it in 1745 to Baroness Magdalena Dorothea von Ledebur-Königsbrück (d. 1750). Thus, in time Peter August became the head of this cadet branch of the House of Oldenburg, he was Duke of Schleswig-Holstein-Sonderburg-Beck in name only.

== Royal descendants ==
He is the male line ancestor of Margrethe II of Denmark, Haakon VIII of Norway, Constantine II of Greece and Charles III of the United Kingdom and the Commonwealth realms, as well as previous Kings of Denmark, Kings of Greece, Kings of Norway and future Kings of the United Kingdom of Great Britain and Northern Ireland.

== Marriages and issue ==
Peter August married Princess Sophie of Hesse-Philippsthal, the daughter of Philip, Landgrave of Hesse-Philippsthal and Countess Katharina Amalie of Solms-Laubach, at Rinteln on 5 September 1723. Sophie died on 8 May 1728 at age 33. They had three children:

- Prince Karl of Schleswig-Holstein-Sonderburg-Beck (October 1724 – March 1726).
- Princess Ulrike Amelie Wilhelmine of Schleswig-Holstein-Sonderburg-Beck (20 May 1726 – died shortly after).
- Prince Karl Anton August of Schleswig-Holstein-Sonderburg-Beck (10 August 1727 – 12 September 1759).

He married secondly Countess Natalia Nikolaievna Golovina, granddaughter of Count Fyodor Alexeyevich Golovin, only daughter of Count Nicholas Fedorovich Golovin and Sophia Pushkina, on 15 March 1742. The couple had the following three children:

- Prince Peter of Schleswig-Holstein-Sonderburg-Beck (1 February 1743 – 3 January 1751).
- Prince Alexander of Schleswig-Holstein-Sonderburg-Beck (born and died 1744).
- Princess Catherine of Schleswig-Holstein-Sonderburg-Beck (23 February 1750 – 10 December 1811); married Prince Ivan Sergeevich Baryatinsky (d. 1811); grandmother of Russian field marshal Prince Aleksandr Baryatinsky and Princess Leonilla of Sayn-Wittgenstein-Sayn.

== Ancestry ==
Ancestors of Peter August, Duke of Schleswig-Holstein-Sonderburg-Beck

8. Alexander, Duke of Schleswig-Holstein-Sonderburg
4. August Philipp, Duke of Schleswig-Holstein-Sonderburg-Beck
9. Dorothea of Schwarzburg-Sondershausen
2. Frederick Louis, Duke of Schleswig-Holstein-Sonderburg-Beck
10. William Louis, Count of Nassau-Saarbrücken
5. Marie Sibylle of Nassau-Saarbrücken
11. Anna Amalia of Baden-Durlach
1. Peter August, Duke of Schleswig-Holstein-Sonderburg-Beck
12. Alexander, Duke of Schleswig-Holstein-Sonderburg (= 8)
6. Ernest Günther, Duke of Schleswig-Holstein-Sonderburg-Augustenburg
13. Dorothea of Schwarzburg-Sondershausen (= 9)
3. Louise Charlotte of Schleswig-Holstein-Sonderburg-Augustenburg
14. Philip, Duke of Schleswig-Holstein-Sonderburg-Glücksburg
7. Augusta of Schleswig-Holstein-Sonderburg-Glücksburg
15. Sophie Hedwig of Saxe-Lauenburg

== Sources ==
- "Голштейн-Бек, Петр-Август" . Brockhaus and Efron Encyclopedic Dictionary (in Russian). 1906.

Peter August, Duke of Schleswig-Holstein-Sonderburg-Beck House of Schleswig-Holstein-Sonderburg-Beck Cadet branch of the House of Oldenburg Born: 7 December 1697 Died: 24 February 1775
Regnal titles
Preceded by Charles Louis	Duke of Schleswig-Holstein-Sonderburg-Beck; 22 September 1774 – 24 February 1775	Succeeded by Friedrich Karl Ludwig
