= Frederick William III of Schleswig-Holstein-Sonderburg-Beck =

Duke of Sleeswijk-Holstein-Sonderburg-Beck

Frederick William III, Duke of Schleswig-Holstein-Sonderburg-Beck
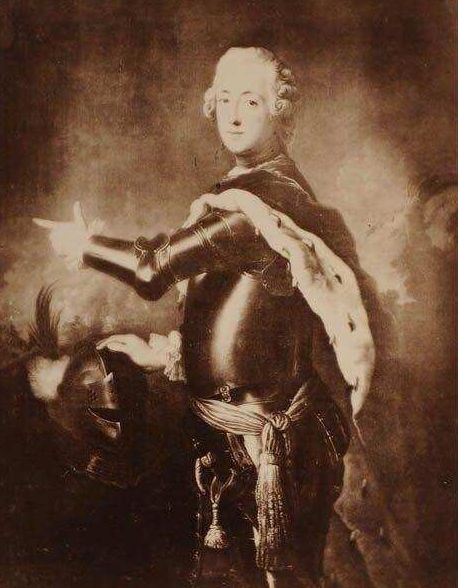
- Frederick William III, Duke of Schleswig-Holstein-Sonderburg-Beck
- Born: 4 November 1723
- Died: 6 May 1757 (aged 33); Prague, Bohemia
- Noble family: House of Oldenburg
- Father: Frederick William II, Duke of Schleswig-Holstein-Sonderburg-Beck
- Mother: Ursula Anna of Dohna-Schlodien

Frederick William III, Duke of Schleswig-Holstein-Sonderburg-Beck (4 November 1723 – 6 May 1757) was the Duke of Schleswig-Holstein-Sonderburg-Beck from 1749.

== Early life ==
He was born as the first child and only son of Frederick William II, Duke of Schleswig-Holstein-Sonderburg-Beck and his second wife, Burgravine Ursula Anna of Dohna-Schlodien (1700-1761).

== Biography ==
Frederick William was a recipient of the Order of the Red Eagle. He served as a colonel in the Prussian Army and was commander of the Füsilier Regiments No. 46 (Old-Württemberg). During the Seven Years' War, he fell in the Battle of Prague in 1757. He was unmarried and childless; he was succeed as Duke of Schleswig-Holstein-Sonderburg-Beck by his uncle Charles Louis.

== Ancestry ==
Ancestors of Frederick William III of Schleswig-Holstein-Sonderburg-Beck

16. Alexander, Duke of Schleswig-Holstein-Sonderburg
8. August Philipp, Duke of Schleswig-Holstein-Sonderburg-Beck
17. Dorothea of Schwarzburg-Sondershausen
4. Frederick Louis, Duke of Schleswig-Holstein-Sonderburg-Beck
18. William Louis, Count of Nassau-Saarbrücken
9. Marie Sibylle of Nassau-Saarbrücken
19. Anna Amalia of Baden-Durlach
2. Frederick William II, Duke of Schleswig-Holstein-Sonderburg-Beck
20. Alexander, Duke of Schleswig-Holstein-Sonderburg (= 16)
10. Ernest Günther, Duke of Schleswig-Holstein-Sonderburg-Augustenburg
21. Dorothea of Schwarzburg-Sondershausen (= 17)
5. Louise Charlotte of Schleswig-Holstein-Sonderburg-Augustenburg
22. Philip, Duke of Schleswig-Holstein-Sonderburg-Glücksburg
11. Auguste of Schleswig-Holstein-Sonderburg-Glücksburg
23. Sophie Hedwig of Saxe-Lauenburg
1. Frederick William III, Duke of Schleswig-Holstein-Sonderburg-Beck
24. Christopher von Dohna
12. Frederick, Burgrave of Dohna
25. Ursula of Solms-Braunfels
6. Christopher I, Burgrave and Count of Dohna-Schlodien
26. John III du Puy, Marquess of Montbrun-Ferrassieres
13. Sperentia du Puy de Montbrun-Ferrassieres
27. Antoinette of Poissant
3. Ursula Anna of Dohna-Schlodien
28. Christopher von Dohna (= 24)
14. Christian Albert, Burgrave and Count of Dohna
29. Ursula of Solms-Braunfels (= 25)
7. Frederice-Marie of Dohna-Vianen
30. John Wolfart of Brederode
15. Sophie Theodore of Brederode
31. Anna of Nassau-Siegen

Frederick William III of Schleswig-Holstein-Sonderburg-Beck House of Oldenburg Born: 4 November 1723 Died: 6 May 1757
| Preceded by Frederick William II | Duke of Schleswig-Holstein-Sonderburg-Beck; 1749-1757 | Succeeded by Charles Louis |
