= Frederick Louis, Duke of Schleswig-Holstein-Sonderburg-Beck =

Frederick Louis
- Duke of Schleswig-Holstein-Sonderburg-Beck
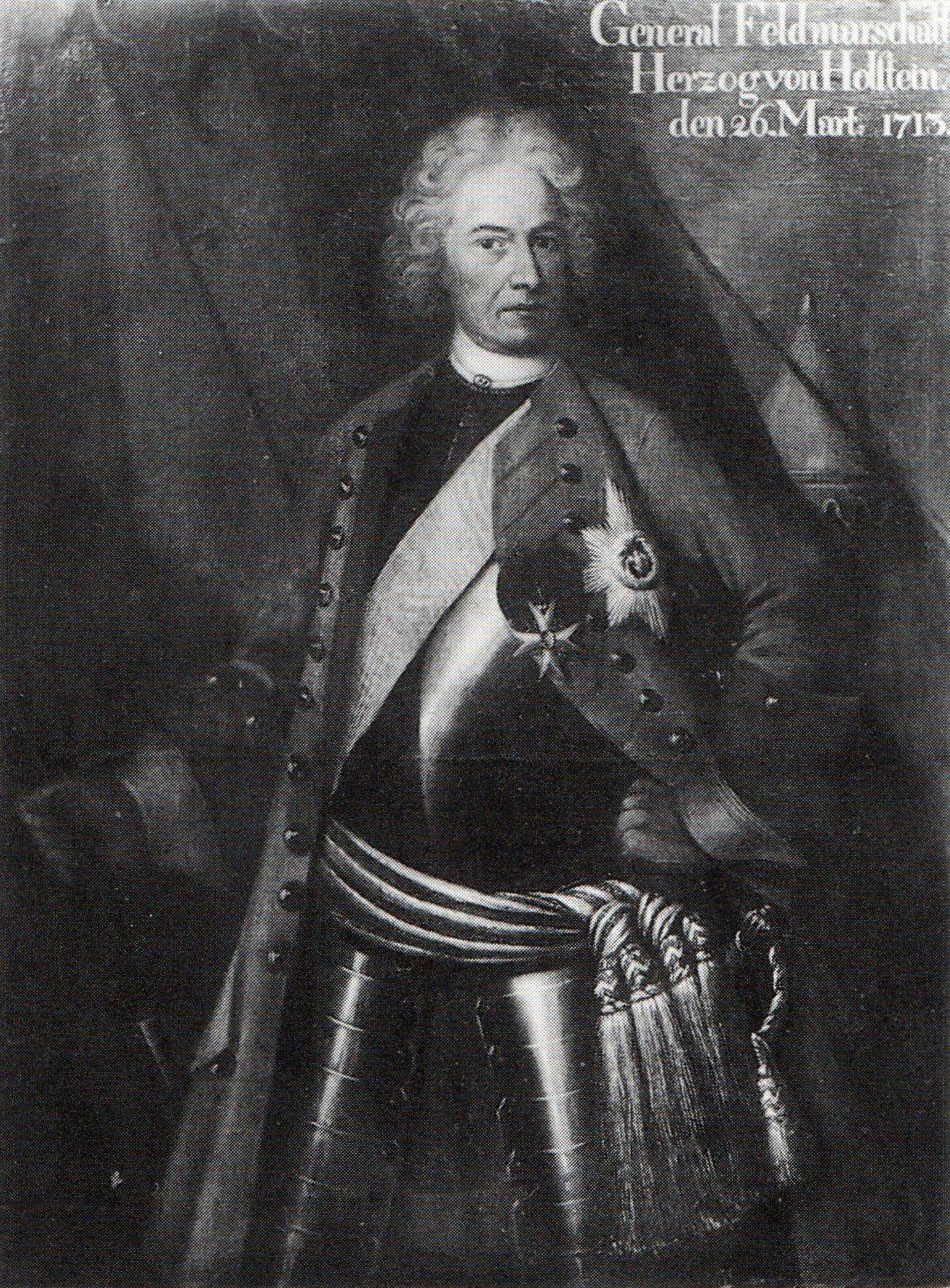
- Portrait, 1721
- Born: 6 April 1653; Haus Beck, near Ulenburg, Westphalia, Brandenburg
- Died: 7 March 1728 (aged 74); Königsberg, Prussia
- Spouse: Louise Charlotte of Schleswig-Holstein-Sonderburg-Augustenburg (m. 1685)
- Issue: Dorothea, Margravine of Brandenburg-Bayreuth-Kulmbach; Frederick William II, Duke of Schleswig-Holstein-Sonderburg-Beck; Charles Louis, Duke of Schleswig-Holstein-Sonderburg-Beck; Peter August, Duke of Schleswig-Holstein-Sonderburg-Beck
- House: Schleswig-Holstein-Sonderburg-Beck
- Father: August Philipp, Duke of Schleswig-Holstein-Sonderburg-Beck
- Mother: Marie Sibylle

Frederick Louis, Duke of Schleswig-Holstein-Sonderburg-Beck (German: Friedrich Ludwig Herzog von Schleswig-Holstein-Sonderburg-Beck; 6 April 1653 – 7 March 1728) was a Duke of Schleswig-Holstein-Sonderburg-Beck and field marshal of the Prussian Army.

== Early life ==
Frederick Louis was born in Haus Beck (now part of Löhne), near Ulenburg, Westphalia, Margraviate of Brandenburg, as the son of August Philipp, Duke of Schleswig-Holstein-Sonderburg-Beck and his wife, Countess Marie Sibylle of Nassau-Saarbrücken.

== Biography ==
He was only the titular duke, because he did not inherit the domain of Beck. It had been inherited by Duke Frederick William I, the son of his elder brother, Duke August, in 1689. Duke Frederick William I was killed in the Battle of Francavilla in Sicily in 1719, leaving a widow, née Maria Antonia called Antoinette Josepha Isnardi di Castello, Contessa di Sanfré (1692–1762), and two minor daughters. Maria Antonia shared administration of Beck with her mother-in-law, Duchess Hedwig Louisa of Schleswig-Holstein-Sonderburg-Beck (née Countess of Lippe-Bückeburg-Schaumburg).

In 1671 Frederick Louis became a cornet in the cavalry regiment von Eller in the army of Brandenburg-Prussia. In 1675 he participated in the Battle of Fehrbellin as a Rittmeister. The following year he was a colonel in the Holstein dragoons. Frederick Louis was named lieutenant general and Governor of Wesel in 1690. Three years later he was appointed commanding general of the Duchy of Prussia.

On 17 January 1701 Frederick Louis received the Order of the Black Eagle from the new King Frederick I of Prussia and shortly afterward was named Statthalter of the Kingdom of Prussia and Governor of Königsberg. During the War of the Spanish Succession, he participated in the Battle of Oudenarde in 1708, the Battle of Malplaquet in 1709, and the sieges of Lille, Mons, and Tournai. Frederick Louis was promoted to field marshal in 1713. The duke also secured neutrality for Prussia during much of the Great Northern War. He died in Königsberg and was buried alongside his wife in Königsberg Cathedral.

== Marriage and issue ==
On 1 January 1685 in Augustenburg, Frederick Louis married his cousin, Princess Louise Charlotte of Schleswig-Holstein-Sonderburg-Augustenburg, daughter of Ernest Günther, Duke of Schleswig-Holstein-Sonderburg-Augustenburg and his wife, Princess Auguste of Schleswig-Holstein-Sonderburg-Glücksburg. They had several children:

- Princess Dorothea of Schleswig-Holstein-Sonderburg-Beck (24 November 1685 - 25 December 1761)
- Frederick William II, Duke of Schleswig-Holstein-Sonderburg-Beck (18 June 1687 - 11 November 1749)
- Prince Frederick Louis of Schleswig-Holstein-Sonderburg-Beck (25 August 1688 - 5 November 1688)
- Princess Sophie Charlotte of Schleswig-Holstein-Sonderburg-Beck (15 August 1689 - 8 October 1693)
- Charles Louis, Duke of Schleswig-Holstein-Sonderburg-Beck (18 September 1690 - 22 September 1774)
- Princess Amelie Auguste of Schleswig-Holstein-Sonderburg-Beck (22 September 1691 - 11 August 1693)
- Prince Philip William of Schleswig-Holstein-Sonderburg-Beck (10 June 1693 - c. November 1729
- Princess Louise Albertine of Schleswig-Holstein-Sonderburg-Beck (27 August 1694 - 10 January 1773)
- Peter August, Duke of Schleswig-Holstein-Sonderburg-Beck (7 December 1697 - 22 May 1775)
- Princess Sophie Henriette of Schleswig-Holstein-Sonderburg-Beck (18 December 1698 - 9 January 1768). Married to Albrecht Christoph, Count of Dohna-Leistenau (1698-1752)
  - Countess Charlotte of Dohna-Leistenau (3 July 1738 – 21 April 1786), married to Prince Karl Anton August of Schleswig-Holstein-Sonderburg-Beck.
- Princess Charlotte of Schleswig-Holstein-Sonderburg-Beck (15 March 1700 - 19 July 1785)

Frederick Louis was succeeded as duke by his eldest son, Frederick William II (1687–1749) (whose only son, Duke Frederick William III, died in the Battle of Prague in 1757), and eventually by his younger sons, Charles Louis (1690–1774), and Peter August (1697–1775).

In 1732, Frederick William II would purchase Beck from Maria Antonia, re-uniting the ducal title and ducal lands. But the latter only remained in the family until sold again in 1745.

== Ancestry ==
Ancestors of Frederick Louis, Duke of Schleswig-Holstein-Sonderburg-Beck

8. John II, Duke of Schleswig-Holstein-Sonderburg
4. Alexander, Duke of Schleswig-Holstein-Sonderburg
9. Elisabeth of Brunswick-Grubenhagen
2. August Philipp, Duke of Schleswig-Holstein-Sonderburg-Beck
10. John Günther I, Count of Schwarzburg-Sondershausen
5. Countess Dorothea of Schwarzburg-Sondershausen
11. Countess Anna of Oldenburg-Delmenhorst
1. Frederick Louis, Duke of Schleswig-Holstein-Sonderburg-Beck
12. Louis II, Count of Nassau-Weilburg
6. William Louis, Count of Nassau-Saarbrücken
13. Anna Maria of Hesse-Kassel
3. Countess Marie Sibylle of Nassau-Saarbrücken
14. George Frederick, Margrave of Baden-Durlach
7. Anna Amalia of Baden-Durlach
15. Countess Juliane Ursula of Salm-Neufville

== Bibliography ==
- Albinus, Robert (1985). Lexikon der Stadt Königsberg Pr. und Umgebung (in German). Leer: Verlag Gerhard Rautenberg. p. 371. ISBN 3-7921-0320-6.
- Th. Hirsch (1878). "Friedrich Ludwig, Herzog von Schleswig-Holstein-Beck" . Allgemeine Deutsche Biographie (in German). Vol. 8. Leipzig: Duncker & Humblot. p. 284.
- Huberty, Michel; Alain Giraud; F. and B. Magdelaine (1994). L'Allemagne Dynastique Tome VII Oldenbourg (in French). France. pp. 79, 97, 118, 141. ISBN 2-901138-07-1.

Frederick Louis, Duke of Schleswig-Holstein-Sonderburg-Beck House of Oldenburg Born: 7 April 1653 Died: 7 March 1728
Preceded by Frederick William I	Duke of Schleswig-Holstein-Sonderburg-Beck; 1719-1728	Succeeded by Frederick William II
