= Frederick William I of Schleswig-Holstein-Sonderburg-Beck =

Duke of Schleswig-Holstein-Sonderburg-Beck

Frederick William I, Duke of Schleswig-Holstein-Sonderburg-Beck
- Born: 2 May 1682; Haus Beck, near Ulenburg, Westphalia, Brandenburg, Holy Roman Empire
- Died: 26 June 1719 (aged 37); Battle of Francavilla, Francavilla di Sicilia, Sicily
- Noble family: House of Oldenburg
- Spouse: Maria Antonia "Antoinette" Josepha Isnardi di Castello
- Father: August, Duke of Schleswig-Holstein-Sonderburg-Beck
- Mother: Countess Hedwig Louise of Lippe-Alverdissen

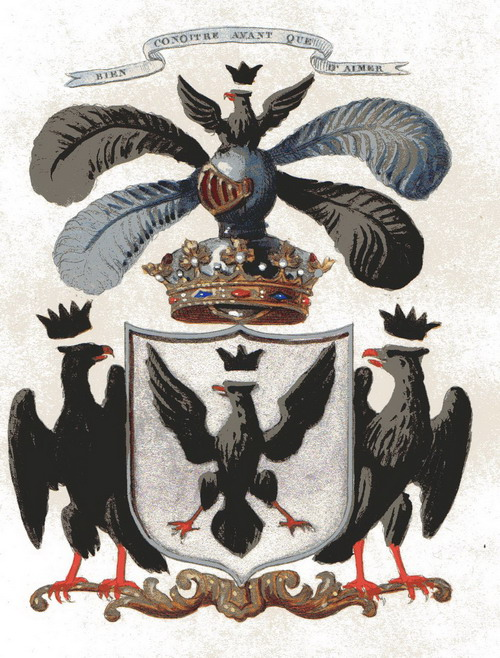
Coat of Arms of the family of Duke's wife, Antoinette Josefa Isnardi di Castello, Countess of Sanfrè

Frederick William I, Duke of Schleswig-Holstein-Sonderburg-Beck (German: Friedrich Wilhelm I. Herzog von Schleswig-Holstein-Sonderburg-Beck; 2 May 1682 – 26 June 1719) was a son of Duke August and his wife, Countess Hedwig Louise of Lippe-Alverdissen (1650-1731). He succeeded his father as Duke of Schleswig-Holstein-Sonderburg-Beck in 1689.

== Biography ==
He converted to Roman Catholicism and joined the Army of the Holy Roman Empire. He died of his wounds received six days earlier in the Battle of Francavilla in Francavilla di Sicilia, Sicily, against Spain, in the War of the Quadruple Alliance, on 20 June 1719.

Since he had no surviving male heir, he was succeeded as Duke of Schleswig-Holstein-Sonderburg-Beck by his paternal uncle Frederick Louis.

== Marriage and issue ==
In Munich, Bavaria, on 8 February 1708, he married Maria Antonia called Antoinette Josefa Isnardi di Castello, 8th Countess of Sanfré (Munich, Bavaria, 15 October 1692 – Vienna, Austria, 17/18 February 1762), sister of Ignazio Giambattista Isnardi di Castello, 6th Marquess of Caraglio and 7th Count of Sanfrè, Marquess of Lenoncourt and Marquess of Balinville, and daughter of Francesco Antonio Massimiliano Emmanuele Isnardi di Castello (14 July 1658 – ?), 5th Marquess of Caraglio and 6th Count Consort of Sanfrè, Piedmont, Savoy, later Sardinia, and wife, Maria Magdalene Grundemann von Falkenberg (d. 1740), heiress of Sanfrè and Strevi. They had two surviving daughters:

- Luise (Brussels, 4 June 1711 - Brussels, 3 September 1712)
- a child (8 June 1712 - Rotenburg, 30 November 1713?)
- Eugen (20 January 1714 - Regensburg, 2 May 1717)
- Charlotte (4 January 1715 - April 1716)
- Maria Anna Leopoldine (Linz, Vienna, 2 August 1717 - Turin, Sardinia, 7 February 1759/1789, buried Sanfré), heiress of Sanfré, Piedmont, married in Vienna on 4 August 1735 Dom Manuel de Sousa (21 July 1703 - in a fire, in prison, in Lisbon, January 1759), Lord of the Majorats of o Calhariz, Monfalim and os Olivais, in Portugal, and had issue, which took the surname de Sousa-[e-]Holstein and later also de Sousa-[e-]Holstein-Beck and became Counts of Palmela then Marquesses of Palmela and finally Dukes of o Faial de juro e herdade, title traded by the one of Duke of Palmela de juro e herdade, Counts of o Calhariz, Marquesses of o Faial, Marquesses of Monfalim, Marquesses of Sousa-Holstein and Marquesses of Sesimbra, extinct in male line on 6 May 1934, but which female lines of representation maintain the surnames and titles of Duke of Palmela de juro e herdade, Marquess of o Faial, Count of o Calhariz, Marquess of Sousa-Holstein, Marquess of Monfalim and Marquess of Sesimbra, having also inherited by marriage the titles of Viscount of a Lançada and Count of a Póvoa and Baron of Teixeira; her second cousin William, Count of Schaumburg-Lippe, also went to Portugal, where he became a notable military commander
- Johanna Amalia/Amalie/Amabila Barbara (Lodi, Milan, 3/4 December 1718/1719 - Vienna, 30 October 1774), married in Vienna on 26 September 1740 Dom Manuel Teles da Silva (Lisbon, 16 September 1696 - Vienna, 8 March 1771), 1st Duke of Silva, 1st Count of Silva-Tarouca in 1735, second brother of the 1st Marquess of Penalva de juro e herdade and 5th Count of Tarouca de juro e herdade in Portugal married with female issue which continued the titles, and had issue, extinct in male line on 21 September 1971
- possibly a boy while in Sicily (1719?-?)

After his death in 1719, his widow, the Duchess Antoinette Josefa (1692-1762) inherited Haus Beck, near Ulenburg, then in Minden-Ravensberg, Brandenburg, Brandenburg-Prussia. But, in 1732, she sold it to the actual Duke, her late husband's first cousin Frederick William II.

== Ancestors ==
Ancestors of Frederick William I of Schleswig-Holstein-Sonderburg-Beck

16. John II, Duke of Schleswig-Holstein-Sonderburg
8. Alexander, Duke of Schleswig-Holstein-Sonderburg
17. Elisabeth of Brunswick-Grubenhagen
4. August Philipp, Duke of Schleswig-Holstein-Sonderburg-Beck
18. John Günther I, Count of Schwarzburg-Sondershausen
9. Dorothea of Schwarzburg-Sondershausen
19. Countess Anna of Oldenburg-Delmenhorst
2. August, Duke of Schleswig-Holstein-Sonderburg-Beck
20. Louis II, Count of Nassau-Weilburg
10. William Louis, Count of Nassau-Saarbrücken
21. Anna Maria of Hesse-Kassel
5. Marie Sibylle of Nassau-Saarbrücken
22. George Frederick, Margrave of Baden-Durlach
11. Anna Amalia of Baden-Durlach
23. Juliana Ursula of Salm-Neuville
1. Frederick William I, Duke of Schleswig-Holstein-Sonderburg-Beck
24. Bernhard VIII, Count of Lippe
12. Simon VI, Count of Lippe
25. Catherine of Waldeck-Eisenberg
6. Philip I, Count of Schaumburg-Lippe
26. Otto IV of Schaumburg
13. Elisabeth of Schaumburg and Holstein-Pinneberg
27. Duchess Maria of Pomerania-Stettin
3. Hedwig Louise of Schaumburg-Lippe
28. William IV, Landgrave of Hesse-Kassel
14. Maurice, Landgrave of Hesse-Kassel
29. Sabine of Württemberg
7. Landgravine Sophie of Hesse-Kassel
30. John VII, Count of Nassau-Siegen
15. Juliana of Nassau-Siegen
31. Magdalene of Waldeck-Wildungen

Frederick William I of Schleswig-Holstein-Sonderburg-Beck House of Oldenburg Born: 2 May 1682 Died: 16 June 1719
| Preceded by August | Duke of Schleswig-Holstein-Sonderburg-Beck; 1689-1719 | Succeeded by Frederick Louis |
