= Henriette Rénard =

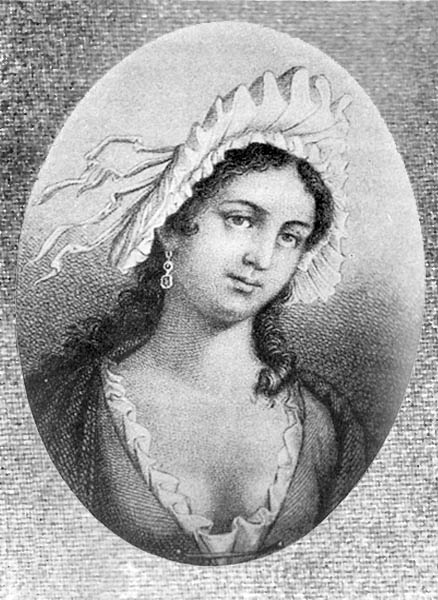
Henriette Rénard

Ana Katharina (Henriette) Rénard (1685 – 26 May 1721), was a mistress of Augustus the Strong, King of Poland and Elector of Saxony and mother of his daughter, the later Countess Anna Karolina Orzelska.

== Life ==
=== Family ===
Anna Katharina, mostly known in sources as Henriette, was a member of the Rénard family, of French origin but established in Warsaw, probably from Hamburg, where they are involved in trade. Her father, Andreas Rénard, appears in documents from 1693 and 1698 as a merchant. His wife was probably Theresa von Waldstein, but some historians believe that in fact she was Andreas' daughter-in-law. Henriette had certainly two brothers: Jan Baptiste, who was a colonel in the Saxon army and Benedict, who was an architect.

=== Relationship with Augustus II the Strong ===
At the end of 1701 or 1706 Henriette met Augustus II the Strong, Elector of Saxony and King of Poland. According to Karl Ludwig von Pöllnitz in his work La Saxe galante, she drew the attention of the Elector-King with her extreme beauty, and soon became his mistress. In the summer of 1702 or 26 November 1707, Henriette gave birth to Augustus II's daughter, named Anna Karolina or Anna Katharina. According to von Pöllnitz, the reason for the separation between them was the jealousy of the official royal mistress, Countess Anna Constantia of Cosel. Henriette's affair with Augustus II allowed her family to gain titles and estates in Poland.

=== Later years ===
During the relationship with Augustus II the Strong, Henriette was probably already married to François Drian, wine trader from Warsaw, who died before 1716, probably during the plague epidemic of 1708–1712.

In 1716, Henriette remarried; her second husband was Claude Henri de Morel de Carrières, who, since 1705, was a colonel in the army of Francis II Rákóczi, Prince of Transylvania. After his marriage with the King's former mistress, Claude received from Augustus II the position of supervisor of the bathrooms at Ujazdów Park, who belonged to the House of Lubomirski. Claude died certainly before 6 June 1720, because that day Henriette (as a widow) and her brothers were raised to the ranks of polish barons.

Henriette died on 26 May 1721 and was buried three days later in St. John's Archcathedral at the great altar from the sacristy.

On 19 September 1724, Anna Karolina, Henriette's daughter, was formally recognized by Augustus II and received the title of Countess Orzelska. On 30 August 1730, she married with Prince Charles Louis of Schleswig-Holstein-Sonderburg-Beck, and divorced three years later.

== Bibliography ==
- J. Bartoszewicz: Znakomici mężowie polscy w XVIII wieku: wizerunki historycznych osób skreślone przez Juljana Bartoszewicza. T. 2., Petersburg 1856, pp. 270–278. (Library University of Warsaw (in Polish))
- K. L. von Pöllnitz: Ogień pałającej miłości, Czytelnik, Warsaw 1973, pp. 151–161.
- S. Szenic: Królewskie kariery warszawianek, Iskry, Warsaw 1959, pp. 52–61, 64–66.
- M. Zgórniak: BENEDYKT RENARD – ARCHITEKT POLSKI XVIII W [retrieved 6 January 2015].
