= Charles Louis, Duke of Schleswig-Holstein-Sonderburg-Beck =

Charles Louis
- Duke of Schleswig-Holstein-Sonderburg-Beck
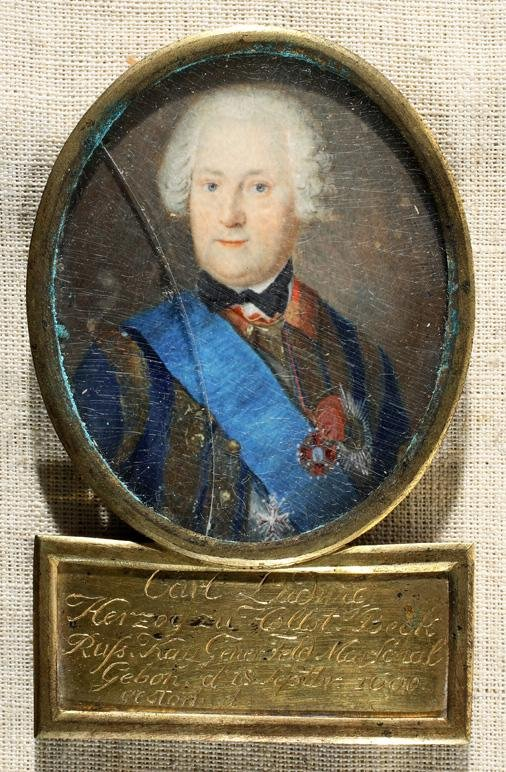
- Reign: 1757–1774
- Born: 18 September 1690
- Died: 22 September 1774 (aged 84); Königsberg, East Prussia, Prussia
- Spouse: Anna Karolina Orzelska
- House: House of Oldenburg
- Father: Frederick Louis, Duke of Schleswig-Holstein-Sonderburg-Beck
- Mother: Louise Charlotte of Schleswig-Holstein-Sonderburg-Augustenburg

Charles Louis, Duke of Schleswig-Holstein-Sonderburg-Beck (German: Karl Ludwig Herzog von Schleswig-Holstein-Sonderburg-Beck; 18 September 1690 – 22 September 1774) was a Lieutenant General in the Prussian Army and Governor of Reval (Tallinn) in the Governorate of Estonia.

== Life ==
Charles Louis was born as the second son of Frederick Louis, Duke of Schleswig-Holstein-Sonderburg-Beck (1653–1728) and his wife, Princess Louise Charlotte of Schleswig-Holstein-Sonderburg-Augustenburg (1658–1740).

== Biography ==
In 1723, he converted to Roman Catholicism. Charles Louis became the titular Duke of Schleswig-Holstein-Sonderburg-Beck in 1757 after his nephew Colonel Frederick William III died in the Battle of Prague without leaving a male heir. He was appointed field marshal by Emperor Peter III of Russia in 1762, but he refused because of his age.

== Marriage and issue ==
In 1730 he married Countess Anna Karolina Orzelska in Dresden, Electorate of Saxony. She was an illegitimate daughter of August II the Strong, Prince-Elector of Saxony and King of Poland and Grand-Duke of Lithuania, by his French mistress Henriette Rénard. Anna sought divorce after just three years of what proved to be an unhappy arranged marriage. They had one son:

- Duke Karl Frederick (b. Dresden, 5 January 1732 – d. Strassburg, 21 February 1772), General Major of the Saxon Army; Karl never married and did not have issue

== Death ==
Charles Louis died in 1774 in Königsberg, East Prussia. He was succeeded by Peter August of Schleswig-Holstein-Sonderburg-Beck.

== Ancestry ==
Ancestors of Charles Louis, Duke of Schleswig-Holstein-Sonderburg-Beck

16. Johann II, Duke of Schleswig-Holstein-Sonderburg-Plon
8. Alexander, Duke of Schleswig-Holstein-Sonderburg
17. Elisabeth of Brunswick-Grubenhagen
4. August Philipp, Duke of Schleswig-Holstein-Beck
18. John Günther I, Count of Schwarzburg-Sondershausen
9. Dorothea von Schwarzburg-Sondershausen
19. Anna of Oldenburg-Delmenhorst
2. Frederick Louis, Duke of Holstein-Sonderburg-Beck
20. Louis II, Count of Nassau-Weilburg
10. William Louis, Count of Nassau-Saarbrücken
21. Anna Maria of Hesse-Kassel
5. Marie Sibylle of Nassau-Saarbrücken
22. George Frederick, Margrave of Baden-Durlach
11. Anna Amalia of Baden-Durlach
23. Juliane Ursula zu Salm-Neufville
1. Charles Louis, Duke of Schleswig-Holstein-Sonderburg-Beck
24. Johann II, Duke of Schleswig-Holstein-Sonderburg-Plon (= 16)
12. Alexander, Duke of Schleswig-Holstein-Sonderburg (= 8)
25. Elisabeth of Brunswick-Grubenhagen (= 17)
6. Ernest Günther, Duke of Schleswig-Holstein-Sonderburg-Augustenburg
26. John Günther I, Count of Schwarzburg-Sondershausen (= 18)
13. Dorothea von Schwarzburg-Sondershausen (= 9)
27. Anna of Oldenburg-Delmenhorst (= 19)
3. Louise Charlotte of Schleswig-Holstein-Sonderburg-Augustenburg
28. Johann II, Duke of Schleswig-Holstein-Sonderburg-Plon (= 16)
14. Philip, Duke of Schleswig-Holstein-Sonderburg-Glücksburg
29. Elisabeth of Brunswick-Grubenhagen (= 17)
7. Auguste of Schleswig-Holstein-Sonderburg-Glücksburg
30. Francis II of Saxe-Lauenburg-Ratzeburg
15. Sofie Hedwig of Saxe-Lauenburg
31. Maria of Brunswick-Lüneburg

Charles Louis, Duke of Schleswig-Holstein-Sonderburg-Beck House of Schleswig-Holstein-Sonderburg-Beck Cadet branch of the House of Schleswig-Holstein-Sonderburg Born: 18 September 1690 Died: 22 September 1774
Preceded by Frederick William III	Duke of Schleswig-Holstein-Sonderburg-Beck; 1757-1774	Succeeded by Peter August
