= Prince Karl Anton August of Schleswig-Holstein-Sonderburg-Beck =

Prince of Schleswig-Holstein-Sonderburg-Beck (1725–1759)

Prince Karl Anton August
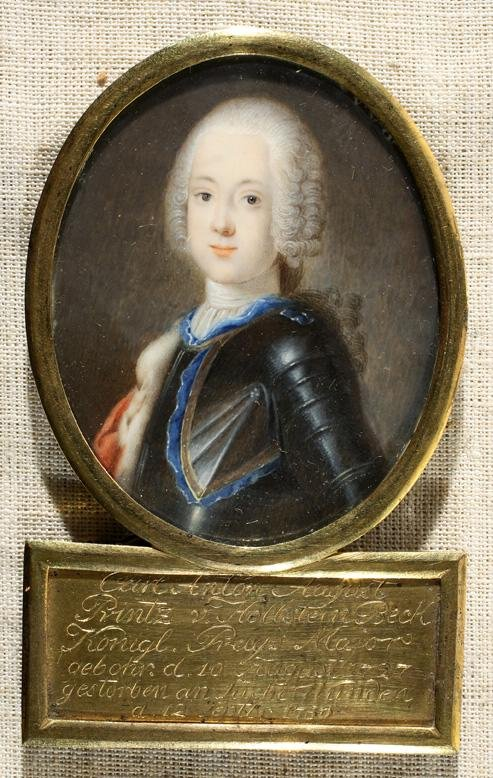
- Karl Anton August as major in the Prussian Army
- Born: 10 August 1727; Marburg, Hesse-Darmstadt
- Died: 12 September 1759 (aged 32); Stettin, Pomerania, Prussia
- Spouse: Countess Charlotte of Dohna-Schlodien
- Issue: Friedrich Karl Ludwig, Duke of Schleswig-Holstein-Sonderburg-Beck
- House: Schleswig-Holstein-Sonderburg-Beck
- Father: Peter August, Duke of Schleswig-Holstein-Sonderburg-Beck
- Mother: Sophie

Prince Karl Anton August of Schleswig-Holstein-Sonderburg-Beck (10 August 1727, in Marburg – 12 September 1759, in Stettin) was the son of Peter August, Duke of Schleswig-Holstein-Sonderburg-Beck and Princess Sophie of Hesse-Philippsthal.

== Marriage and issue ==
On 30 May 1754, Anton (as he was known) married Countess Frederica Charlotte of Dohna-Schlodien in Leistenau in Königsberg. The couple had one child, Friedrich Karl Ludwig, Duke of Schleswig-Holstein-Sonderburg-Beck.

Anton would have inherited the dukedom of Schleswig-Holstein-Sonderburg-Beck had it not been for his early death by wounds suffered at the Battle of Kunersdorf, where he had fought as a major in the Prussian Army. His father Peter outlived him, so the dukedom was passed on from Peter to Anton's only son, Friedrich.

== Ancestry ==
Ancestors of Prince Karl Anton August of Schleswig-Holstein-Sonderburg-Beck

8. August Philipp, Duke of Schleswig-Holstein-Sonderburg-Beck
4. Frederick Louis, Duke of Schleswig-Holstein-Sonderburg-Beck
9. Countess Marie Sibylle of Nassau-Saarbrücken
2. Peter August, Duke of Schleswig-Holstein-Sonderburg-Beck
10. Ernest Günther, Duke of Schleswig-Holstein-Sonderburg-Augustenburg
5. Princess Louise Charlotte of Schleswig-Holstein-Sonderburg-Augustenburg
11. Princess Augusta of Schleswig-Holstein-Sonderburg-Glücksburg
1. Prince Karl Anton August of Schleswig-Holstein-Sonderburg-Beck
12. William VI, Landgrave of Hesse-Kassel
6. Philip, Landgrave of Hesse-Philippsthal
13. Princess Hedwig Sophie of Brandenburg
3. Landgravine Sophie of Hesse-Philippsthal
14. Count Charles Otto of Solms-Laubach
7. Countess Catherine Amalia of Solms-Laubach
15. Countess Amoena Elisabeth of Bentheim-Bentheim
