= John of Denmark =

John of Denmark or Hans of Denmark may refer to:

- John of Dacia, author of Summa Grammatica (c. 1280)
- Hans, King of Denmark (r. 1455–1513)
- Hans of Denmark (1518–1532), heir apparent to Christian II of Denmark
- Hans the Elder, Duke of Schleswig-Holstein-Haderslev (1521–1580)
- Hans the Younger, Duke of Schleswig-Holstein-Sonderburg (1545–1622)
- John, Prince of Schleswig-Holstein (1583–1602)
- Prince Johann of Schleswig-Holstein-Sonderburg-Glücksburg (1825–1911)
