= August, Duke of Schleswig-Holstein-Sonderburg-Beck =

August
- Duke of Schleswig-Holstein-Sonderburg-Beck
- Predecessor: August Philipp
- Successor: Frederick William I
- Born: 13 February 1652
- Died: 26 September 1689 (aged 37) near Bonn, Archbishopric-Electorate of Cologne
- Spouse: Hedwig Louise of Lippe-Alverdissen
- House: House of Oldenburg
- Father: August Philipp, Duke of Schleswig-Holstein-Sonderburg-Beck
- Mother: Marie Sibylle of Nassau-Saarbrücken

August, Duke of Schleswig-Holstein-Sonderburg-Beck (13 February 1652 – 26 September 1689) was a Danish nobleman. From 1675 until his death, he was the ruling Duke of Schleswig-Holstein-Sonderburg-Beck. He was the second duke of this appanage.

== Life ==
August was the eldest son of Duke August Philip (1612-1675) and his wife, Countess Marie Sibylle of Nassau-Saarbrücken (1628-1699). Four of his younger brothers and four sisters survived into adulthood. His father was the fifth son of Duke Alexander and a grandson of John II, the founder of the Schleswig-Holstein-Sonderburg line.

The Schleswig-Holstein-Sonderburg-Beck was named after Beck House, a manor in Ulenburg, which is today the smallest borough of Löhne, a town in north-eastern North Rhine-Westphalia. At the time, Ulenburg was situated in the Bishopric of Minden. In 1648, the Margraviate of Brandenburg acquired the area. Brandenburg was expanding its army and needed soldiers and officers. The prime requirement for becoming an officer was noble birth. Consequently, it was only natural for August to pursue a military career. His became a Major general in the Brandenburg army.

August died of dysentery on 26 September 1689 in Bonn. He was succeeded by his son Frederick William I.

== Marriage and issue ==
In 1676, August married Hedwig Louise of Lippe-Alverdissen (1650-1731), a daughter of Count Philip I, the founder of Schaumburg-Lippe line of the House of Lippe. Together, they had two children:

- Dorothea Henriette (1678 – after 1755)
- Frederick William I (1682-1719), married Marie Antoinette of Sanfré

== Ancestors ==
Ancestors of August, Duke of Schleswig-Holstein-Sonderburg-Beck

16. Christian III of Denmark
8. John II, Duke of Schleswig-Holstein-Sonderburg
17. Dorothea of Saxe-Lauenburg
4. Alexander, Duke of Schleswig-Holstein-Sonderburg
18. Ernest III, Duke of Brunswick-Grubenhagen
9. Elisabeth of Brunswick-Grubenhagen
19. Margaret of Pomerania-Wolgast
2. August Philipp, Duke of Schleswig-Holstein-Sonderburg-Beck
20. Günther XL, Count of Schwarzburg
10. John Günther I, Count of Schwarzburg-Sondershausen
21. Elisabeth of Isenburg-Büdingen-Ronneburg
5. Dorothea of Schwarzburg-Sondershausen
22. Anthony I, Count of Oldenburg
11. Anna of Oldenburg-Delmenhorst
23. Sophie of Saxe-Lauenburg
1. August, Duke of Schleswig-Holstein-Sonderburg-Beck
24. Albert, Count of Nassau-Weilburg
12. Louis II, Count of Nassau-Weilburg
25. Anna of Nassau-Dillenburg
6. William Louis, Count of Nassau-Saarbrücken
26. William IV, Landgrave of Hesse-Kassel
13. Anna Maria of Hesse-Kassel
27. Sabine of Württemberg
3. Marie Sibylle of Nassau-Saarbrücken
28. Charles II, Margrave of Baden-Durlach
14. George Frederick, Margrave of Baden-Durlach
29. Anna of Veldenz
7. Anna Amalia of Baden-Durlach
30. Frederick, Wild- and Rhinegrave of Salm-Neufville
15. Juliana Ursula of Salm-Neufville
31. Frenciska of Salm-Badenweiler

== Footnotes ==
August, Duke of Schleswig-Holstein-Sonderburg-Beck House of Oldenburg Born: 13 February 1652 Died: 26 September 1689
Preceded by August Philip	Duke of Schleswig-Holstein-Sonderburg-Beck; 1675-1689	Succeeded by Frederick William I
