= Schleswig-Holstein-Sonderburg-Beck =

German noble family

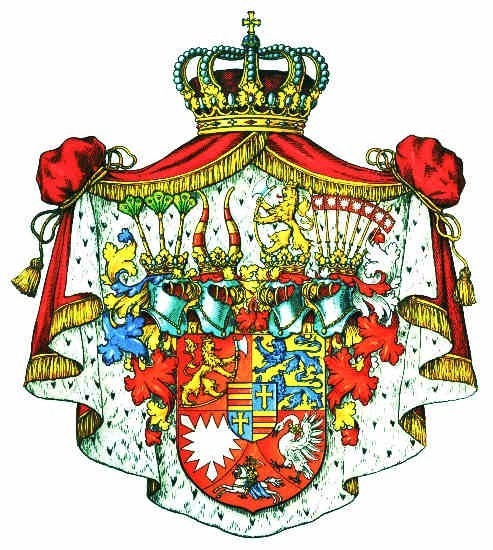
Coat of arms of the Dukes of Schleswig-Holstein-Sonderburg-Beck

The House of Schleswig-Holstein-Sonderburg-Beck (Danish: Slesvig-Holsten-Sønderborg-Beck; Schleswig-Holstein-Beck or Beck for short) is a line of the Schleswig-Holstein-Sonderburg branch of the House of Oldenburg. It consisted of August Philipp, Duke of Schleswig-Holstein-Sonderburg-Beck (1612–1675) and his male-line descendants. Schleswig-Holstein-Sonderburg-Glücksburg (or simply House of Glücksburg), to which several present-day royal houses belong, is the new name of Schleswig-Holstein-Beck.

The members of the line were titular dukes of Schleswig and Holstein, and they were originally not ruling. The line is named after Beck, a manor in Ulenburg, Bishopric of Minden (today Löhne, North Rhine Westphalia). August Philipp bought this manor from the Count of Oldenburg, and he made it his residence.

== Dukes of Schleswig-Holstein-Sonderburg-Beck ==
Family tree of the Dukes of Schleswig-Holstein-Sonderburg-Beck (tenure as duke is shown in brackets):

- August Philipp, Duke of Schleswig-Holstein-Sonderburg-Beck (1627–75),
  - August, Duke of Schleswig-Holstein-Sonderburg-Beck (1675–89),
    - Frederick William I, Duke of Schleswig-Holstein-Sonderburg-Beck (1689–1719),
  - Frederick Louis, Duke of Schleswig-Holstein-Sonderburg-Beck (1719–28),
    - Frederick William II, Duke of Schleswig-Holstein-Sonderburg-Beck (1728–49),
      - Frederick William III, Duke of Schleswig-Holstein-Sonderburg-Beck (1749–57),
    - Charles Louis, Duke of Schleswig-Holstein-Sonderburg-Beck (1757–74),
    - Peter August, Duke of Schleswig-Holstein-Sonderburg-Beck (1774–75),
      - Prince Karl Anton August of Schleswig-Holstein-Sonderburg-Beck,
        - Friedrich Karl Ludwig, Duke of Schleswig-Holstein-Sonderburg-Beck (1775–1816),
          - Friedrich Wilhelm, Duke of Schleswig-Holstein-Sonderburg-Glücksburg (1816–25), founder of the Schleswig-Holstein-Sonderburg-Glücksburg line in 1825.
