= August Philipp, Duke of Schleswig-Holstein-Sonderburg-Beck =

Danish-German prince (1612–1675)

August Philipp
- Duke of Schleswig-Holstein-Sonderburg-Beck
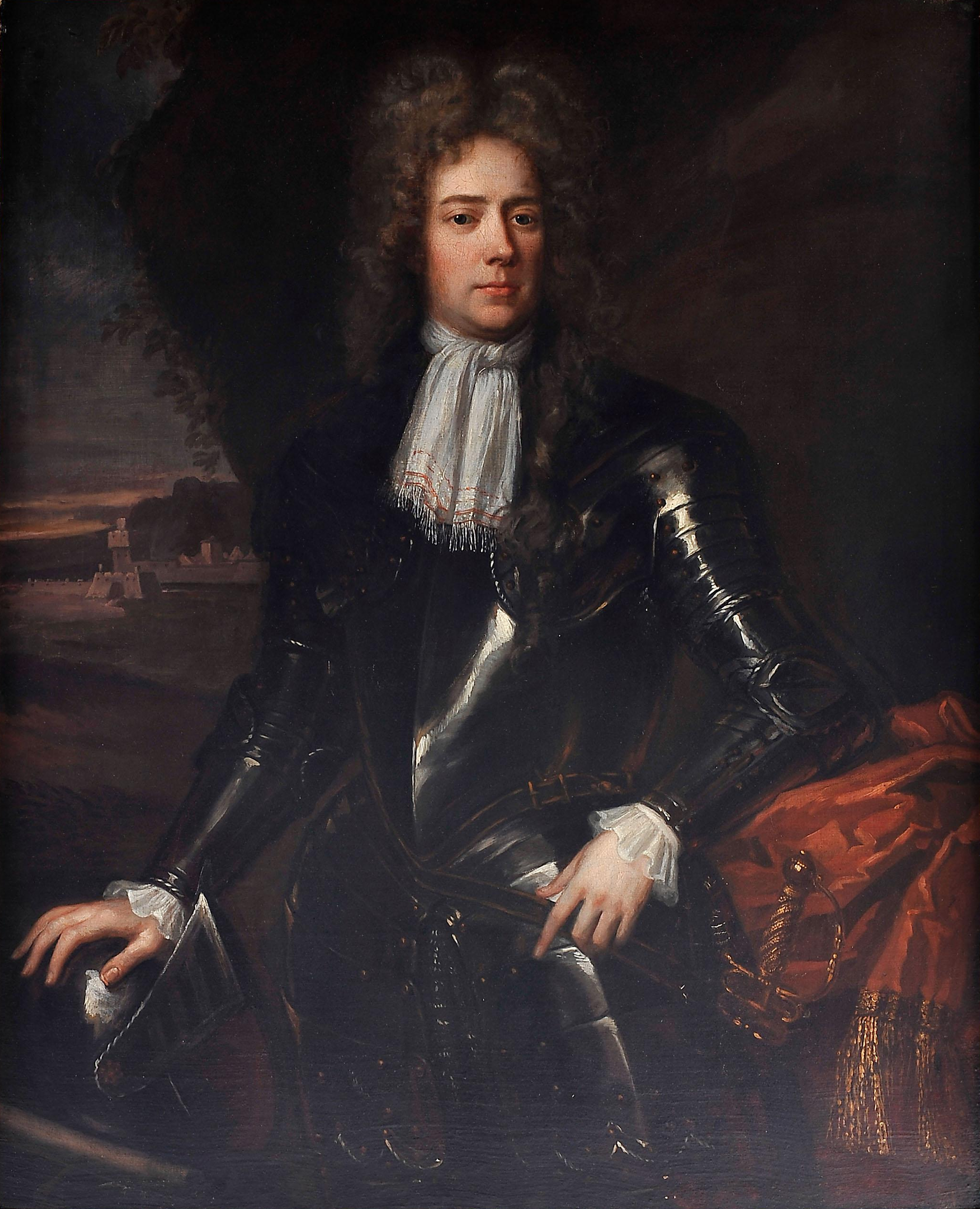

Duke of Schleswig-Holstein-Sonderburg-Beck
- Successor: August, Duke of Schleswig-Holstein-Sonderburg-Beck
- Born: 11 November 1612; Sønderborg, Duchy of Schleswig
- Died: 6 May 1675 (aged 62); Haus Beck, near Ulenburg, Westphalia, Brandenburg
- Spouse: Clara of Oldenburg; Sidonie of Oldenburg; Marie Sibylle of Nassau-Saarbrücken
- Issue: Sophie Luise, Countess of Lippe-Brake; August, Duke of Schleswig-Holstein-Sonderburg-Beck; Frederick Louis, Duke of Schleswig-Holstein-Sonderburg-Beck; Dorothea Amalia, Countess of Lippe-Alverdissen; Sophia Elisabeth; Wilhelmine Augusta; Luise Clara; Sophie Eleonore; Maximilian William; Anton Günther; Ernst Kasimir; Karl Gustav
Names
- August Philipp
- House: Oldenburg
- Father: Alexander, Duke of Schleswig-Holstein-Sonderburg
- Mother: Dorothea

August Philipp, Duke of Schleswig-Holstein-Sonderburg-Beck (11 November 1612 – 6 May 1675) was a Danish-German prince and member of the House of Oldenburg. After acquiring the estate of Beck in Westfalen in 1646, he took the title of Duke of Schleswig-Holstein-Sonderburg-Beck.

== Biography ==
August Philipp was born on 11 November 1612 in Sønderborg on the island of Als in the Duchy of Schleswig, (then a Danish fief). He was the fifth son of Alexander, Duke of Schleswig-Holstein-Sonderburg and his wife, Countess Dorothea of Schwarzburg-Sondershausen.

Duke Alexander died in 1627 in Sønderborg and left his tiny duchy heavily indebted. In his will, he had stipulated that his wife should keep unaltered estate to pay the debt, and that the eldest son, John Christian, should inherit the entire duchy but remain unmarried for the time being. The widowed Duchess Dorothea was in charge of the duchy during the ensuing war years, but was unable to pay off the debt, which, on the contrary, was still growing. As a consequence, she agreed that the brothers concluded an inheritance agreement on 17 December 1633, according to which John Christian inherited the duchy in exchange for paying a significant annual amount to his mother and siblings.

After the inheritance agreement in 1633, August Philipp severed his ties with Denmark and emigrated to Germany at the age of 21, where he made a career as an officer. In 1646 he bought the estate Haus Beck neat the city of Ulenburg, Prince-Bishopric of Minden, from 1648 in the Duchy of Westphalia within the Margraviate of Brandenburg, from his sister Sophie Katharina, which she had received in dowry from her brother John Christian, upon her marriage to Anthony Günther, Count of Oldenburg. Haus Beck was August Philipp's childhood home, and here he lived for the last 29 years of his life, where he called himself Duke of Schleswig-Holstein-Sonderburg-Beck. He died 6 May 1675 at Haus Beck, then Margraviate of Brandenburg, and was succeeded as duke first by his oldest son, August, and later by his second son, Frederick Louis.

== Marriages and issue ==
August Philipp married three times. In 1645, he married Clara of Oldenburg (1606-1647), daughter of Anthony II, Count of Oldenburg at Delmenhorst. In 1647, he married Sidonie of Oldenburg (1611-1650), another daughter of Anthony II, Count of Oldenburg at Haus Beck. On 12 April 1651, he married Marie Sibylle of Nassau-Saarbrücken (1628-1699), daughter of William Louis, Count of Nassau-Saarbrücken at Haus Beck.

His daughter Sophie Louise married Frederick (1638-1684), son of Otto, Count of Lippe-Brake. His other daughter Dorothea Amalia married Count Philipp Ernest (1659–1753), son of Philip I, Count of Schaumburg-Lippe.

== Legacy ==
August Philipp founded the ducal line of Schleswig-Holstein-Sonderburg-Beck. His sons and their descendance went into Prussian, Polish and Russian service until his grandson's great-grandson took over Glücksburg Castle and the line changed its name to Schleswig-Holstein-Sonderburg-Glücksburg in 1825. August Philip is thus a male-line ancestor of the British, Danish, Greek and Norwegian royal families.

== Ancestors ==
Ancestors of August Philipp, Duke of Schleswig-Holstein-Sonderburg-Beck

8. Christian III of Denmark
4. John II, Duke of Schleswig-Holstein-Sonderburg
9. Dorothea of Saxe-Lauenburg
2. Alexander, Duke of Schleswig-Holstein-Sonderburg
10. Ernest III, Duke of Brunswick-Grubenhagen
5. Elisabeth of Brunswick-Grubenhagen
11. Margaret of Pomerania-Wolgast
1. August Philipp, Duke of Schleswig-Holstein-Beck
12. Günther XL, Count of Schwarzburg
6. John Günther I, Count of Schwarzburg-Sondershausen
13. Elisabeth of Isenburg-Büdingen-Ronneburg
3. Dorothea of Schwarzburg-Sondershausen
14. Anthony I, Count of Oldenburg
7. Anna of Oldenburg-Delmenhorst
15. Sophie of Saxe-Lauenburg

August Philipp, Duke of Schleswig-Holstein-Sonderburg-Beck House of Oldenburg Born: 11 November 1612 Died: 6 May 1675
Preceded by title created	Duke of Schleswig-Holstein-Sonderburg-Beck; 1646-1675	Succeeded by August
