= Alexander, Duke of Schleswig-Holstein-Sonderburg =

Alexander
- Duke of Schleswig-Holstein-Sonderburg
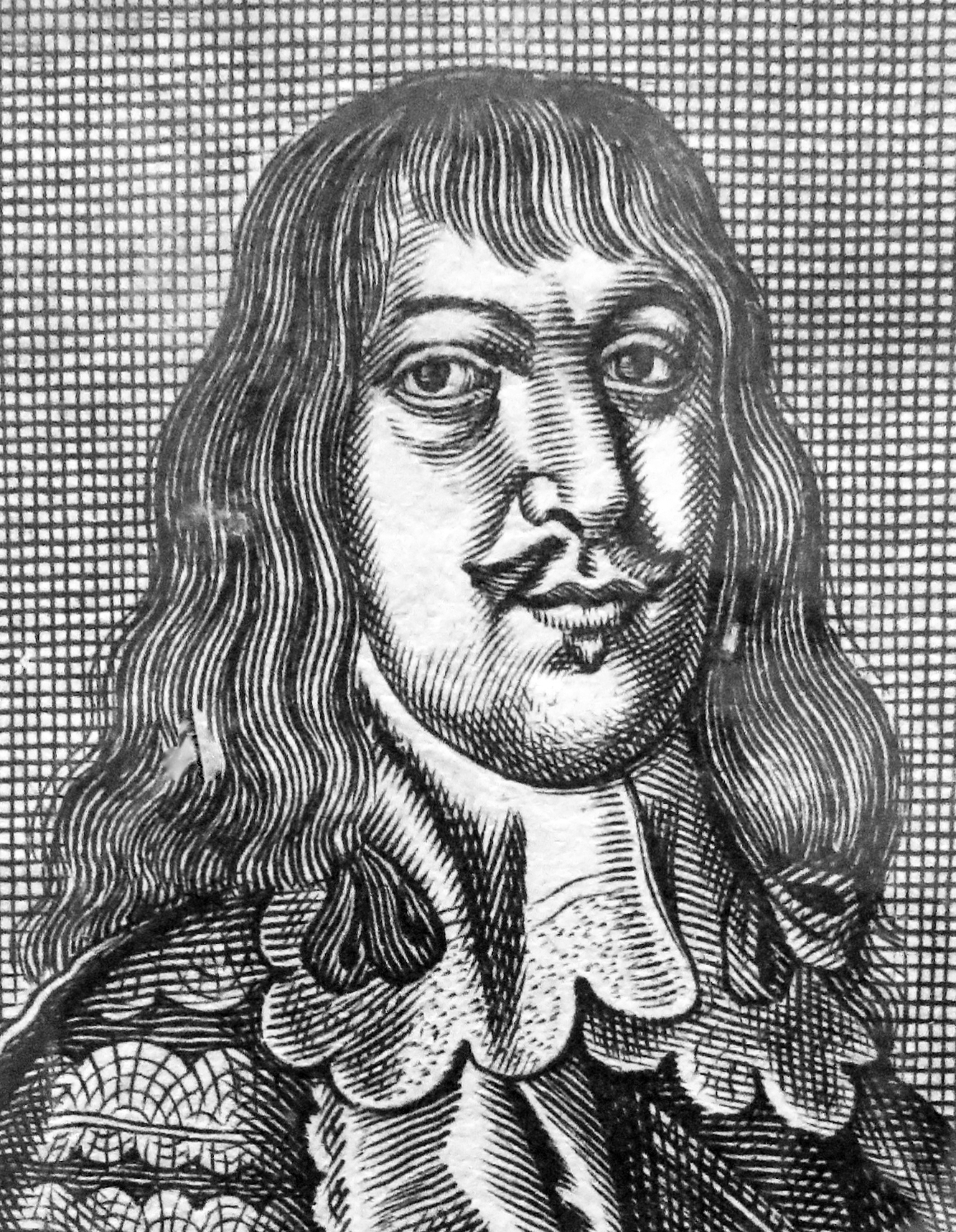
- Born: 20 January 1573; Sønderborg
- Died: 13 May 1627 (aged 54); Sønderborg- Beck
- Spouse: Dorothea of Schwarzburg-Sondershausen (m. 1604)
- Issue: John Christian, Duke of Schleswig-Holstein-Sonderburg; Ernest Günther, Duke of Schleswig-Holstein-Sonderburg-Augustenburg; August Philipp, Duke of Schleswig-Holstein-Sonderburg-Beck; Philip Louis, Duke of Schleswig-Holstein-Sonderburg-Wiesenburg
- House: Schleswig-Holstein-Sonderburg
- Father: John II, Duke of Schleswig-Holstein-Sonderburg
- Mother: Elisabeth of Brunswick-Grubenhagen

Alexander, Duke of Schleswig-Holstein-Sonderburg, (20 January 1573 – 13 May 1627) was a German nobleman.

== Biography ==
Alexander was born in Sonderburg (German: Sonderburg) in Schleswig, the third son of John II, Duke of Schleswig-Holstein-Sonderburg and his wife, Elisabeth of Brunswick-Grubenhagen.

Because his elder surviving brother chose Ærø as his seat, Alexander received Sonderburg upon their father's death and was in practice its second duke. Alexander died in Sonderburg.

== Marriage and issue ==
Alexander married on 26 November 1604 in Oldenburg Countess Dorothea of Schwarzburg-Sondershausen, the youngest daughter of John Günther I, Count of Schwarzburg-Sondershausen and his wife, Countess Anna of Oldenburg-Delmehorst (1539–1579).

Together, they had eleven children:

- John Christian (26 April 1607 – 28 June 1653)
- Alexander Henry (12 September 1608 – 5 September 1657)
- Ernest Günther (14 October 1609 – 18 January 1689)
- George Frederick (18 December 1611 – 23 August 1676)
- August Philipp (11 November 1612 – 6 May 1675)
- Adolph (2 November 1613 – 1 February 1616), died young
- Anna Elisabeth (5 February 1615 – 19 February 1616), died young
- William Anton (2 April 1616 – 2 April 1616), died soon after birth
- Sophie Katharina (28 June 1617 – 22 November 1696), wife of Anthony Günther, Count of Oldenburg
- Eleonore Sabine (27 February 1619 – 27 February 1619), died soon after birth
- Philip Louis (27 October 1620 – 10 March 1689)

== Ancestors ==
Ancestors of Alexander, Duke of Schleswig-Holstein-Sonderburg

16. Christian I of Denmark
8. Frederick I of Denmark
17. Dorothea of Brandenburg
4. Christian III of Denmark
18. John Cicero, Elector of Brandenburg
9. Anna of Brandenburg
19. Margaret of Thuringia
2. John II, Duke of Schleswig-Holstein-Sonderburg
20. John V, Duke of Saxe-Lauenburg
10. Magnus I, Duke of Saxe-Lauenburg
21. Dorothea of Brandenburg
5. Dorothea of Saxe-Lauenburg
22. Henry IV, Duke of Brunswick-Lüneburg
11. Catherine of Brunswick-Wolfenbüttel
23. Catherine of Pomerania
1. Alexander, Duke of Schleswig-Holstein-Sonderburg
24. Albert II, Duke of Brunswick-Grubenhagen
12. Philip I, Duke of Brunswick-Grubenhagen
25. Elisabeth of Waldeck
6. Ernest III, Duke of Brunswick-Grubenhagen
26. Ernest II of Mansfeld-Vorderort
13. Catherine of Mansfeld-Vorderort
27. Barbara of Querfurt
3. Elisabeth of Brunswick-Grubenhagen
28. Bogislaw X, Duke of Pomerania
14. George I, Duke of Pomerania
29. Anna of Poland
7. Margaret of Pomerania-Wolgast
30. Philip, Elector Palatine
15. Amalie of the Palatinate
31. Margaret of Bavaria
