= Battle of Möckern =

1813 battle of the War of the Sixth Coalition

- Part of the German campaign of 1813
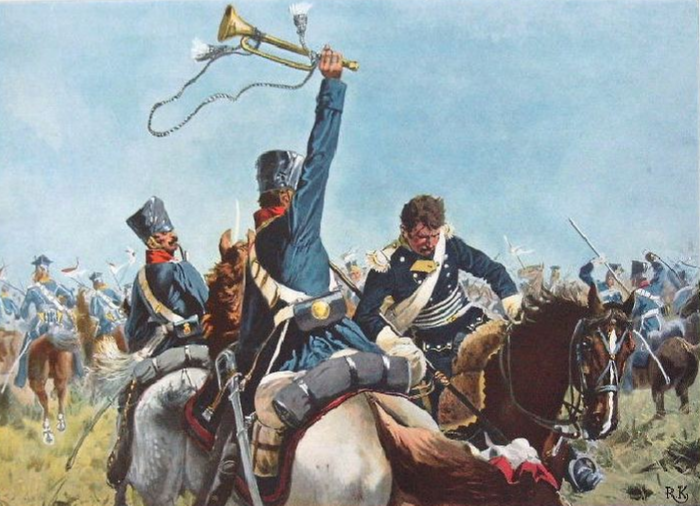
- The great Platen and his trumpeter at Möckern (5 April 1813); Richard Knötel
Date	5 April 1813
Location	Möckern, Prussia 52.14°N 11.95°E
Result	Prusso-Russian victory

Belligerents
(First French Empire) French Empire	(Kingdom of Prussia) Prussia; Russian Empire

Commanders and leaders
(First French Empire) Eugène de Beauharnais	(Russian Empire) Peter Wittgenstein (Note: He led the Prussians and the Russians.)

Strength
37,000 to 50,000: up to 46,000 infantrymen; up to 4,000 cavalrymen	20,000 to 24,000: up to 19,000 infantrymen; up to 5,000 cavalrymen

Casualties and losses
900 to 2,200: up to 1,200 dead and wounded; up to 1,000 captured	500 to 600 dead and wounded
- Location within Europe

War of the Sixth Coalition:
German campaign
current battle
Napoleon in command
Napoleon not in command

The Battle of Möckern (also known as the Battle of Dannigkow) was a series of heavy clashes between allied Prusso-Russian troops under Russian commander Peter Wittgenstein and Napoleonic French forces under Eugène de Beauharnais south of Möckern. It occurred on 5 April 1813. It ended in a French defeat and formed the successful prelude to the "Liberation War" against Napoleon (the German name for the German theatre of the War of the Sixth Coalition).

== Prelude ==
=== Strategic situation ===
Following the disastrous outcome of the French invasion of Russia in late 1812, Napoleon returned to Paris to organize a new army, leaving Marshal Joachim Murat in command of the remaining forces in Central Europe. In January 1813, Murat relinquished command to Napoleon's stepson, Eugène de Beauharnais, who conducted a defensive retreat across Germany. By late March, Eugène established a main defensive position along the Elbe river, utilizing the fortress of Magdeburg as a primary staging hub.

=== Initial maneuvers ===
In response to Prussia entering the war against France, a combined Prusso-Russian force under General Peter Wittgenstein crossed the Elbe to engage Eugène's forces before Napoleon's main relief army could arrive from France. On 4 April 1813, Wittgenstein's advance guards detected French troop movements near the Ehle river south of Möckern. Believing he faced an isolated French corps rather than Eugène's full force, Wittgenstein ordered an immediate attack for the following morning to sever French communications with Magdeburg.

== Armies ==
=== Allied army ===
The combined Prusso-Russian force under General Peter Wittgenstein numbered approximately 24,000 to 25,000 men. The army was organized into two primary national contingents:

- Prussian Corps: Commanded by General Ludwig Yorck von Wartenburg, consisting of advance guards and infantry brigades under Generals Friedrich von Hünerbein and Karl Ludwig von Borstell.
- Russian Corps: Commanded directly by Wittgenstein, with vanguard units under General Gregor von Berg and cavalry reserves under Prince Eugen of Württemberg.

=== French army ===
The French Army of the Elbe under Prince Eugène de Beauharnais concentrated roughly 35,000 men near Magdeburg, though only about 20,000 to 22,000 were engaged directly at Möckern. The principal formations involved included:

- V Corps: Commanded by General Jacques Lauriston, occupying defensive positions around Dannigkow.
- XI Corps: Commanded by General Léonard Huard de Saint-Aubin (in temporary command), holding positions along the Ehle river.
- 1st Cavalry Corps: Light cavalry units deployed to screen the flanks and secure retreat routes toward Magdeburg.

== Battlefield ==
The battle took place approximately 20 kilometers east of Magdeburg, centered around the small town of Möckern and its surrounding villages in the Prussian province of Saxony. The terrain was defined by the Ehle river, a narrow stream flanked by low-lying marshland, wet meadows, and small forested plots that restricted rapid troop maneuvers.

Key tactical positions were anchored in several fortified agrarian villages:

- Dannigkow: Situated on the southern sector along the Ehle, featuring brick structures and stone church compounds that provided natural breastworks for infantry.
- Vehlitz: Located north of Dannigkow, surrounded by boggy terrain that prevented artillery deployment and forced troops to engage across narrow river crossings.
- Gommern and Nedlitz: Outer points guarding the primary roads leading west toward Magdeburg, serving as vital retreat corridors for the French army.

== Battle ==
=== Preparation ===
On the morning of 5 April 1813, General Wittgenstein held a council of war to organize a general offensive against the French force along the Ehle river. Expecting a quick victory over what he assumed was an isolated rear guard, Wittgenstein divided his army into four main attack columns under Generals Yorck, Borstell, Berg, and Hünerbein.

Across the river, Prince Eugène deployed his troops in depth around the key villages of Dannigkow, Vehlitz, and Nedlitz to cover the main roads to Magdeburg. French outposts noticed the Prussian light cavalry movements early in the morning and alerted General Lauriston, allowing the French infantry to occupy stone buildings and fortify village perimeters before the main assault began.

=== Assault on Dannigkow ===
At approximately 13:00, the Prussian brigade under General Friedrich von Hünerbein launched a direct assault on the fortified village of Dannigkow. General Lauriston's V Corps defenders utilized stone churchyards, brick houses, and barricaded streets to stall the advancing Prussian columns.

The fighting quickly descended into brutal house-to-house combat as Prussian infantry fought through intense musketry and point-blank canister fire. After four hours of continuous engagements, French forces exhausted their ammunition supply and were driven out of the village, falling back toward Gommern.

=== Combat at Vehlitz ===
Simultaneously with the assault on Dannigkow, Prussian General Borstell and Russian General Berg launched a combined attack against French positions at Vehlitz. The advancing Allied troops were forced to negotiate boggy marshland and wade across waist-deep channels of the Ehle, which rendered their artillery useless during the initial crossing.

Despite heavy French musket fire from the opposite bank, Allied infantry secured a bridgehead and engaged the defenders in close bayonet combat. French counter-attacks failed to dislodge the combined Prusso-Russian force, and by late afternoon, the French lines around Vehlitz began to crumble, forcing a retreat toward Nedlitz.

=== Action at Möckern and French Retreat ===
As nightfall approached and the French defensive positions at Dannigkow and Vehlitz collapsed, Prince Eugène realized his forces were in danger of being encircled. To buy time for his infantry and baggage trains to fall back westward, Eugène deployed his cavalry reserves near Möckern. French horsemen launched repeated counter-charges against the advancing Allied vanguards, briefly halting the Prusso-Russian momentum along the main road.

General Wittgenstein responded by ordering Allied cavalry units and light horse artillery to support the front lines. A series of sharp, disorganized cavalry skirmishes broke out across the open fields outside Möckern as darkness fell. While the French cavalry suffered heavy casualties under Allied artillery fire, their sacrifice succeeded in preventing a total rout of Eugène's main body.

By late evening, engagement ceased as French forces conducted an orderly night retreat toward the fortress of Magdeburg. Fearing potential French reinforcements or ambushes in the dark, Wittgenstein chose not to conduct a vigorous night pursuit, allowing the main French army to safely cross back over the Elbe river.

== Aftermath ==
=== Casualties ===
The Battle of Möckern resulted in moderate losses relative to the size of the forces involved. Allied casualties—comprising both Prussian and Russian units—were estimated between 500 and 600 men killed, wounded, or missing.

French casualties were significantly higher, totaling approximately 2,200 soldiers. Of these, around 1,000 were captured during the street fighting in Dannigkow and the retreat from Vehlitz, alongside several captured supply wagons and field pieces.

=== Strategic impact ===
Although Möckern was a relatively minor tactical engagement compared to the massive clashes later in 1813, its strategic implications were significant. Unnerved by the Allied pressure and falsely believing that Wittgenstein was attempting to encircle his position, Prince Eugène withdrew his forces fully behind the Elbe and sought shelter near the fortress of Magdeburg.

The victory provided a vital morale boost for the newly formed Sixth Coalition, marking the first successful offensive action by Prusso-Russian forces in the 1813 German Campaign. Furthermore, Eugène's retreat surrendered the initiative in North Germany, allowing the Allies to secure key crossings along the Elbe and prepare for the broader campaign against Napoleon's main relief army prior to the Battle of Lützen.

== Gallery ==
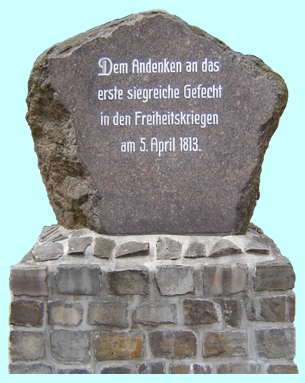
Memorial in Dannigkow

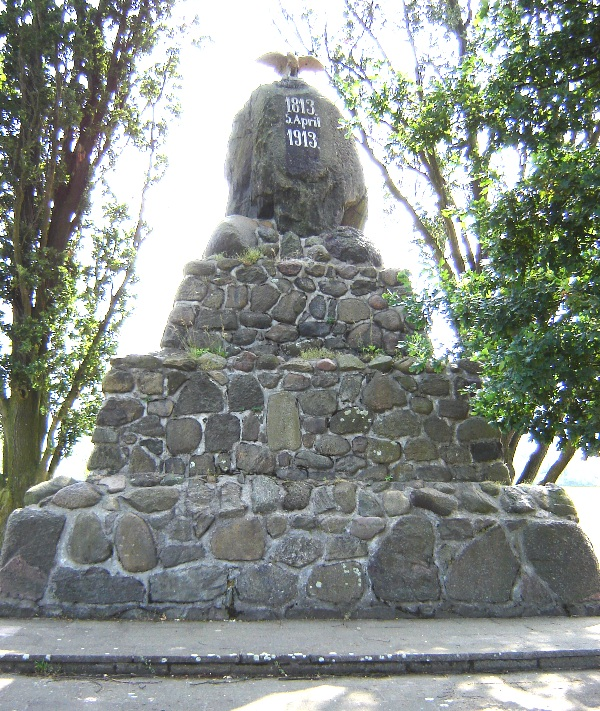
Memorial in Vehlitz

== Sources ==
- Bodart, Gaston (1908). Militär-historisches Kriegs-Lexikon (1618–1905) (in German).
- Bogdanovich, Modest (1863). История войны 1813 года за независимость Германии [History of German Independence War of 1813] (in Russian). Vol. 1. Saint Petersburg: типография Штаба Военно-Учебных Заведений.
