= Ludwig zu Sayn-Wittgenstein-Berleburg =

- Prince of Sayn-Wittgenstein-Berleburg-Ludwigsburg
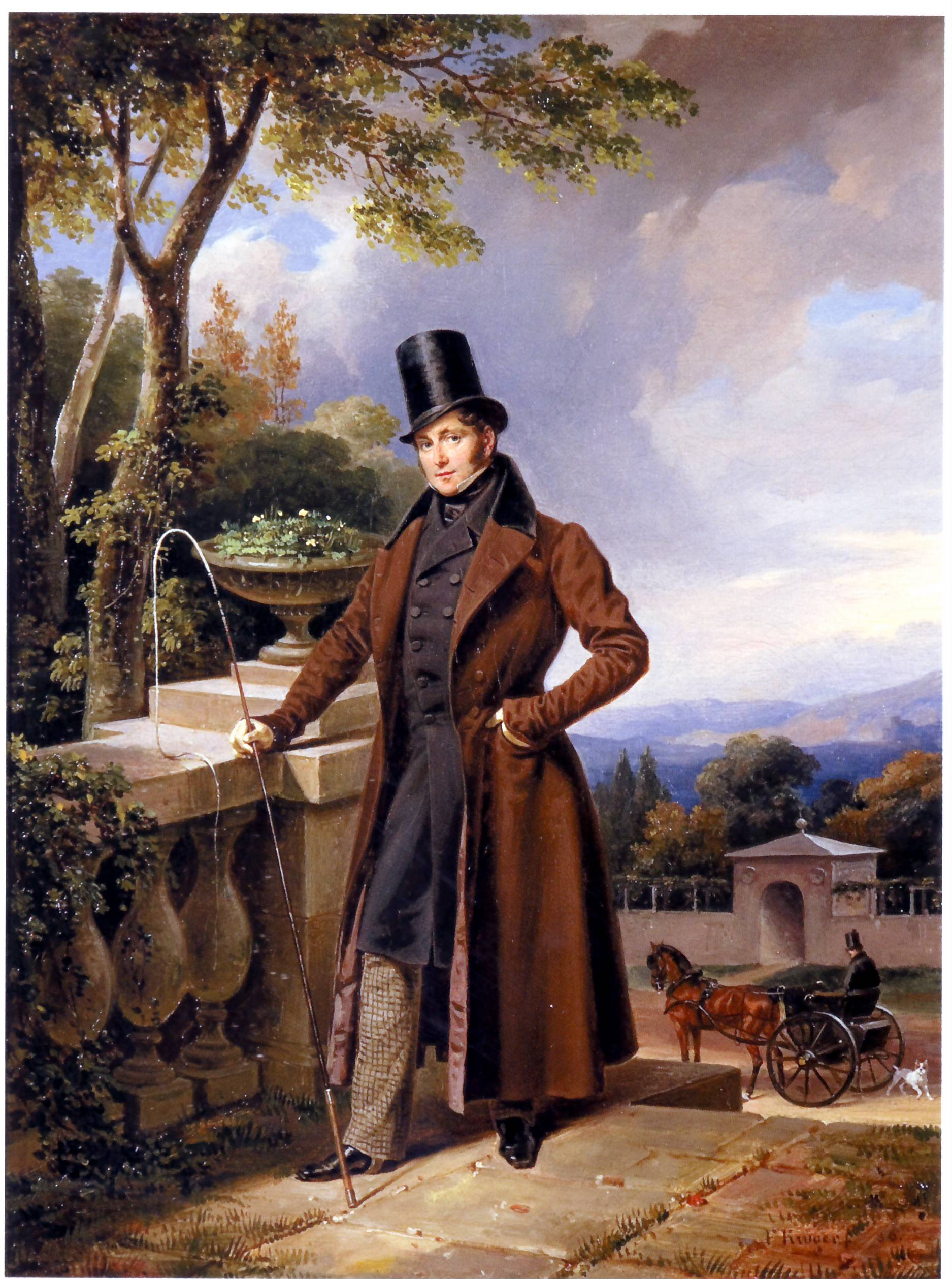
- Portrait by Franz Krüger, 1836
- Born: Ludwig Adolf Friedrich Wittgenstein; 8 June 1799; Kovno, Vilna Governorate, Russian Empire
- Died: 20 June 1866 (aged 67); Cannes, France
- Spouse: Stefania Radziwiłł (m. 1828; died 1832) Leonilla Bariatinskaya (m. 1834)
- Issue: 6
- Father: Peter Wittgenstein
- Mother: Antonia Cäcilie Snarska

Ludwig Adolf Friedrich, 2nd Prince zu Sayn-Wittgenstein-Berleburg-Ludwigsburg (8 June 1799 – 20 June 1866), from 1861 Prince zu Sayn-Wittgenstein-Sayn, was a Russian and German aristocrat. Among his properties were the famed Mir Castle Complex and Verkiai Palace.

== Early life ==
Ludwig was born on 8 June 1799 in Kovno, Vilna Governorate. He was the eldest child of the celebrated German–Russian field marshal, Peter, 1st Prince of Sayn-Wittgenstein-Berleburg-Ludwigsburg. Ludwig was half-Polish through his mother, Antonia Cäcilie Snarska (1778–1856), and was formally known in Russian as Lev Petrovich Vitgenshtein (Лев Петрович Витгенштейн).

On his paternal side, he was descended from a family of ruling German Counts whose seat was in Berleburg (present day North Rhine-Westphalia) and his grandparents were Count Christian Louis Casimir of Sayn-Wittgenstein-Ludwigsburg and his first wife, Countess Amalie Ludowika Finck von Finckenstein (1740-1771). His maternal grandparents were Stanisław Snarski (b. 1752) and his wife, Maria Kazimiera Swołyńska (b. 1756), both members of the Polish nobility.

== Career ==
In 1821, he represented Russia at the coronation of King George IV of the United Kingdom, but his career came to a halt when his participation in the Decembrist societies was revealed in 1826. He secured a pardon through the intervention of his influential father.

On 1 May 1834, Ludwig's father was raised by King Frederick William III of Prussia from an Imperial Count to Prince of (Fürst zu) Sayn and Wittgenstein in the Kingdom of Prussia, where the family's mediatized German domain was located. He was also incorporated into the Russian nobility as a prince on 16 June 1834, where his family had been domiciled for two generations. Ludwig inherited both titles and passed the Russian titles on to his descendants.

== Personal life ==
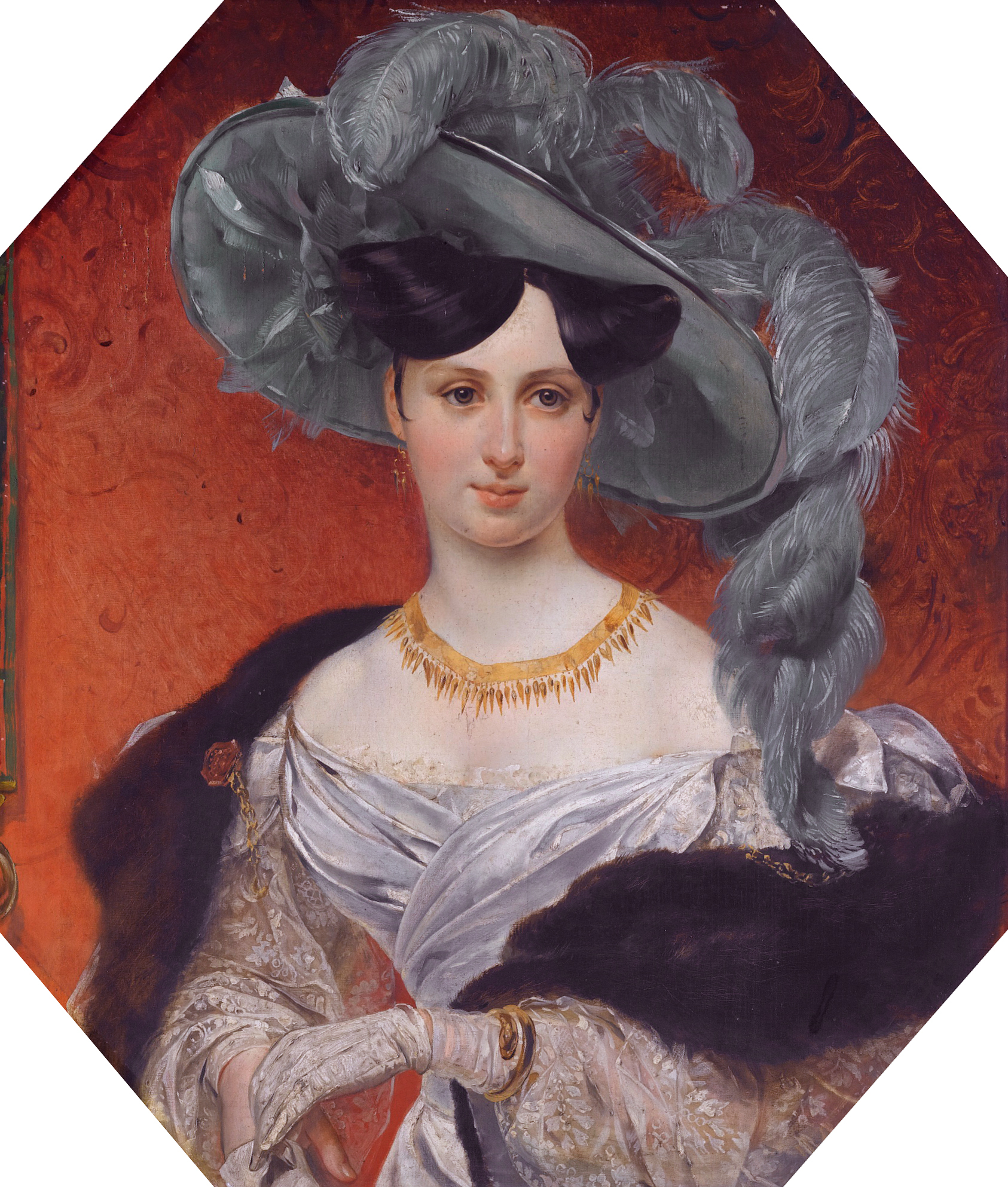
Stefania Radziwiłł

Leonilla Bariatinskaya Princess of Sayn Wittgenstein Sayn (Franz Xaver Winterhalter, 1843), J. Paul Getty Museum, Los Angeles

On 14 June 1828 at St. Petersburg, Ludwig married Princess Stefania Radziwiłł (1809–1832), the only daughter of Prince Dominik Hieronim Radziwiłł by his second wife, Teofilia Morawska (1791–1828). Before her death in 1832, they had two children:

- Princess Marie zu Sayn-Wittgenstein-Sayn (1829–1897), who married Chlodwig, 2nd Prince of Hohenlohe-Schillingsfürst, later the Chancellor of the German Empire.
- Peter, Prince zu Sayn-Wittgenstein (1831–1887), who married Rosalie Léon.

Upon Stefania's death in 1832, Ludwig married his first cousin once removed, Princess Leonilla Bariatinskaya at Castle Marino, Kursk Governorate. She was a daughter of Prince Ivan Ivanovich Baryatinsky (son of Princess Catherine of Schleswig-Holstein-Sonderburg-Beck) and Countess Marie Wilhelmine von Keller (a daughter of Count Christoph von Keller and Ludwig's aunt, Countess Amalie Louise zu Sayn-Wittgenstein-Ludwigsburg). Together, they had a further four children:

- Prince Friedrich zu Sayn-Wittgenstein-Sayn (1836–1909), who first married, morganatically, Pauline Lilienthal (their issue went by the name "von Falkenberg") in 1868. After her death in 1903, he married, also morganatically, Wilhelmine Hagen.
- Princess Antoinette zu Sayn-Wittgenstein-Sayn (1839–1918), who married Prince Mario Chigi della Rovere Albani and had issue, their son Ludovico Chigi Albani della Rovere was Prince Grand Master of the Sovereign Military Order of Malta
- Prince Ludwig zu Sayn-Wittgenstein-Sayn (1843–1876), who married morganatically to Amalie Lilienthal, sister of Pauline Lilienthal; they did not have issue.
- Prince Alexander zu Sayn-Wittgenstein-Sayn (1847-1940), who married Marie Auguste Yvonne de Blacas d'Aulps, daughter of Louis, Duke of Blacas. After her death in 1881, he married, morganatically, Helena Królikowska, daughter of Leon Królikowski, member of the minor Polish nobility. (their issue went by the name "von Hachenburg").

After his retirement, he lived abroad from the 1840s until his death. Prince Sayn-Wittgenstein-Berleburg-Ludwigsburg died on 20 June 1866 in Cannes, France. His eldest son succeeded as the 3rd Prince. Upon his death, Ludwig's second son, Prince Friedrich (who did not have any children), succeeded his elder brother in certain Russian titles and estates and was therefore confirmed with the title of Knyaz (Fürst) in Russia with the qualification of Serene Highness by Imperial Ukase from 1899 bearing the name Prince of Sayn-Wittgenstein. The current head of the family is descended through the issue of his youngest son, Prince Alexander.

=== Estates ===
From his first marriage, he came into possession of the largest privately owned estate in Central Europe covering roughly 12,000 km^{2} (4,600 sq mi) of fields, forests, villages and towns in the former Polish–Lithuanian Commonwealth. The estate included the famed Mir Castle Complex.

To ensure the property status of his children from his second marriage, he established, in 1846, another entailed estate of Sayn in German. These lands had belonged to his German ancestors in former times. From 1861 forward, he himself, and then his descendants (only the eldest in male lines), were called the Most Serene Princes of Sayn-Wittgenstein-Sayn, making the children from his Russian wife German again.
