= Leonilla Bariatinskaya =

Leonilla Baryatinskaya
- Princess of Sayn-Wittgenstein-Sayn
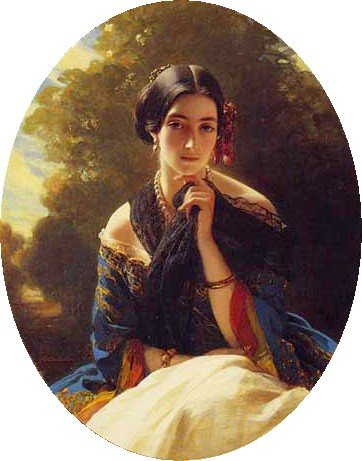
- Portrait by Franz Xaver Winterhalter, 1849
- Born: 9 May 1816; Moscow, Russian Empire
- Died: 1 February 1918 (aged 101); Lausanne, Switzerland
- Spouse: Ludwig of Sayn-Wittgenstein-Sayn (m. 1834; died 1866)
- Issue: Fyodor; Antoinette; Ludwig; Alexander
Names
- Leonilla Ivanovna Baryatinskaya
- Father: Prince Ivan Baryatinsky
- Mother: Countess Marie Wilhelmine von Keller

Leonilla Ivanovna Baryatinskaya, Princess of Sayn-Wittgenstein-Sayn (Russian: Леони́лла Ива́новна Баря́тинская; 9 May 1816 – 1 February 1918), was a Russo-German aristocrat who married Ludwig, Prince of Sayn-Wittgenstein-Sayn. She was the subject of a number of portraits by Franz Xaver Winterhalter.

== Life and family ==
Princess Leonilla Ivanovna Baryatinskaya was born on 9 May 1816 in Moscow. She was a daughter of Prince Ivan Ivanovich Baryatinsky (1772–1825), a member of one of the most influential families of the Russian nobility, and son of Princess Catherine of Schleswig-Holstein-Sonderburg-Beck. Her mother was Countess Marie Wilhelmine von Keller (1792–1858), daughter of Count Christoph von Keller (1757–1827), a German diplomat, and Countess Amalie Louise zu Sayn-Wittgenstein-Ludwigsburg (1771–1853), sister of Field Marshal Prince Peter zu Sayn-Wittgenstein-Berleburg-Ludwigsburg.

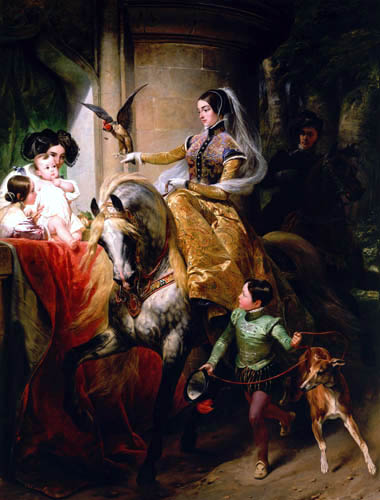
Princess Leonilla Ivanovna on horseback, shows a bird to a little child and consoles him

On 23 October 1834, Leonilla married her cousin and one of the Tsar's aides de camp, Prince Ludwig zu Sayn-Wittgenstein-Berleburg-Ludwigsburg (1799–1866), at Castle Marino, Kursk Governorate. Ludwig was a Russian aristocrat of German descent, who was known in Russia as Lev Petrovich Wittgenstein. He was the eldest son of Peter, 1st Prince of Sayn-Wittgenstein-Berleburg-Ludwigsburg, and a Polish noblewoman, Antonia Cäcilie Snarska (1779–1855). Ludwig had been previously married to Princess Stefania Radziwill (1809–1832), who bequeathed to him, on her early death, a large estate in central Europe and two children: Peter (who died without issue), and a daughter Marie, who married Prince Chlodwig zu Hohenlohe-Schillingsfürst, Chancellor of the German Empire.

Leonilla and Ludwig had four children:

- Fyodor (Friedrich) (1836–1909), a major in the Russian service, in January 1880. He married a commoner, Wilhelmina Hagen, renounced his princely title and took the name of Count von Altenkirchen
- Antoinette (1839–1918), since 1857 she was married to Prince Mario Chigi-Albano della Rovere (1832–1914), Prince of Campagnano in 1857; their son Louis led the Order of Malta.
- Ludwig (baptized with the name Leo) Lvovich (7 March 1843, Paris – 1876), died unmarried.
- Alexander (1847–1940), in 1883 renounced the princely title, and took the name of Count von Hohenburg, was married three times, including the daughter of the collector of antiques Duke de Blacas. The Sayn-Wittgenstein-Sayn family is now headed by his great-grandson Alexander (born 1943).

Her beauty created an impression at the Russian court, but her husband fell from favor, perhaps because of his liberal treatment of his serfs. They left Russia in 1848. Ludwig received, as a present from King Friedrich Wilhelm IV of Prussia, the former family seat Sayn Castle, which had been destroyed in the Thirty Years' War. With the purchase of a former knight's manor in Sayn, he gained the title of Prince (Fürst) zu Sayn-Wittgenstein-Sayn. They had extensive landholdings in the Russian Empire. Among their properties were Pavlino, Kamenka, south of Kiev, and Werki, in what is now Lithuania. Leonilla, who converted to Catholicism from Russian Orthodoxy, preferred Rome and Paris, where she witnessed the pillage of the Tuileries in 1848. The princely family moved from country to country with the seasons, taking with them their children, pets, servants and tutors.

Ludwig and Leonilla owned the former Baroque manor of the Counts of Boos-Waldeck below Sayn Castle reconstructed into a princely residence in Gothic Revival style. Their youngest son Alexander married Yvonne, daughter of the French Duke of Blacas, and inherited Sayn after the morganatic marriages of his older brothers Peter, Friedrich and Ludwig. After his wife's early death, he remarried and spent his life as Count of Hachenburg in the former family residences in Hachenburg and Friedewald in the Westerwald. Princess Leonilla operated a monarchist and Catholic salon and died in 1918 at the age of 101 at her villa of Mon Abri on Lake Geneva, Switzerland. She was one of the longest-lived members of any royal family.

== Conversion to Roman Catholicism ==
On 24 June 1847, with the consent of her husband, Leonilla converted from Orthodoxy to Catholicism. His faith had always influenced her. Once she was widowed, she devoted even more to philanthropic works and philanthropy.

In 1876, at a time when the exercise of the Catholic faith was not yet fully authorized in the canton of Vaud, she built on her property a private chapel, which became in 1912 the parish church of the Sacred Heart of Ouchy. Her funeral was held in this church on 5 February 1918.

== Winterhalter's portraits ==
Leonilla Bariatinskaya Princess of Sayn Wittgenstein Sayn (1843), oil on canvas, 142 × 212 cm, J. Paul Getty Museum

Known for her great beauty and intellect, Leonilla was the subject of a number of portraits by Franz Xaver Winterhalter. The most famous of these is the one currently at the J. Paul Getty Museum in Los Angeles. It is signed and dated in 1843 in the pillar on the right. Winterhalter opted for a daring portrait, unusual in his oeuvre, both in conception and format.

She appears reclined on a low Turkish sofa on a veranda overlooking a lush tropical landscape, possibly the Wittgenstein palace in the Crimea, even though the portrait was painted in Paris. Her pose is reminiscent of harem scenes and odalisque. It was probably inspired by Jacques-Louis David's portrait of Madame Récamier (1800) and Ingres's Grande Odalisque (1819). Leonilla is wearing a luxurious gown of ivory silk moiré, with a pink sash around her waist. A deep purple mantle wraps around her back and falls across her arms. She gazes languidly at the viewer while she toys with the large pearls around her neck in an indolent gesture, reinforcing the sensuality of the model.

Another Winterhalter portrait contrasted the sumptuous fabrics and vivid colors against the princess's alabaster flesh to heighten the sensuality of the pose, the model, and the luxuriant setting. The oval portrait is also signed but not dated. Its dimensions are 97 × 79 cm, and it still belongs to the princess's descendants. It was painted years earlier, probably in 1836 in Rome, when Winterhalter met the Princess of Sayn-Wittgenstein-Sayn and her husband and made portraits of both of them. Leonilla appears wearing a loose bodice, blue-lined with scarlet, over a white skirt. She has a black lace scarf draped around her shoulders. She is wearing pearl earrings and necklace. She is seated, with one hand in her lap, the index finger of the other rest on her chin in a confident gesture.

== See also ==
- Alexander Vladimirovich Baryatinsky
- Yury Baryatinsky
- Aleksandr Baryatinsky
