= Christian Louis Casimir, 2nd Count of Sayn-Wittgenstein-Ludwigsburg-Berleburg =

German noble (1725–1797)

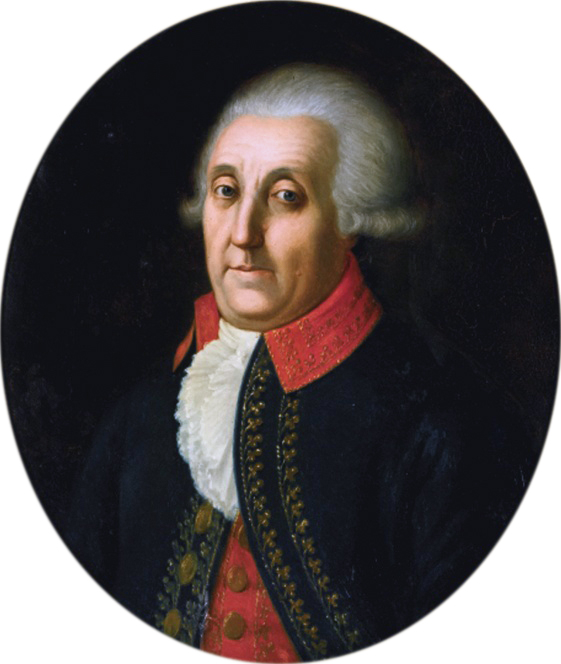
Count Christian Louis Casimir of Sayn-Wittgenstein-Ludwigsburg

Christian Louis Casimir, 2nd Count of Sayn-Wittgenstein-Berleburg-Ludwigsburg (German: Christian Ludwig Casimir Graf zu Sayn-Wittgenstein-Berleburg-Ludwigsburg; 13 July 1725 – 6 May 1797) was a reigning Count of Sayn-Wittgenstein-Berleburg-Ludwigsburg line of Sayn-Wittgenstein family from 1750 to 1796.

== Early life ==
He was a son of Count Ludwig Franz of Sayn-Wittgenstein-Berleburg (1694–1750) (a descendant of Ludwig I, Count of Sayn-Wittgenstein, through his son Count George II) and his wife, Countess Helene Emilie zu Solms-Baruth (1799–1750).

== Military service ==
Christian Ludwig Casimir served as an officer in the Hessian army (in the "Waldenheimische Regiment" for William VIII, Landgrave of Hesse-Kassel), took part in the War of the Austrian Succession (in the Pragmatic Army as aide-de-camp (adjutant) of British Field-Marshal Baron Howard de Walden) and was taken captive in Kolberg as a General of the Prussian Army in 1761 during the Seven Years' War in the Russian Empire.

== Russian service ==
Like so many German officers he was offered a commission by the German Peter III of Russia and entered the Imperial Russian Army in 1762. His last war was the Russo-Turkish campaign of 1769. In command of a brigade of the 2nd Army of Count Nikita Panin, he tried to capture town of Bendery but, in absence of heavy artillery, was unsuccessful. After his transfer to the 1st Army, he proceeded not to take part in the 1770 campaign. In the same (1770) year he resigned his commission, was granted approval and at the same time promoted (common promotion for higher pension retirees) to general-poruchik (lieutenant-general).

== Personal life ==
He was married two times. Firstly, on 13 July 1763 with Countess Amalie Ludowika Finck von Finckenstein (1740-1771), daughter of Count Elias Ernst Finck von Finckenstein (1713-1777) and his wife, Marie Luise von Reichau (d. 1758).

Secondly, on 14 February 1774 with Princess Anna Petrovna Dolgorukova (1742-1789), daughter of Peter Sergeievich Dolgorukov (1721-1773) and his wife, Sofia Apostol (1721-1773). All of his seven children, including Ludwig Adolph Peter, Prince Wittgenstein, came from the first marriage:

- Count Paul Ludwig Karl (1764-1790)
- Count Fedrinand (1766-1771)
- Prince Ludwig Adolf Peter zu Sayn-Wittgenstein-Berleburg-Ludwigsburg (1769-1843), married in 1798 to Polish noblewoman Antonia Cäcilie Snarska and had in this marriage 11 children, among them Prince Ludwig zu Sayn-Wittgenstein-Sayn.
- Count Georg Ludwig Alexander (1770-1774)
- Countess Karoline Polyxena Friederike (1765-1766)
- Countess Karoline Luise (1771-1779)
- Countess Amalie Luise (1771-1853), married in 1790 to Count Dorotheus Ludwig Christoph von Keller. They were maternal grandparents of Princess Leonilla zu Sayn-Wittgenstein-Sayn and Prince Aleksandr Baryatinsky.
