= Battle of Smoliani =

1812 battle during the French invasion of Russia

- Part of the French invasion of Russia
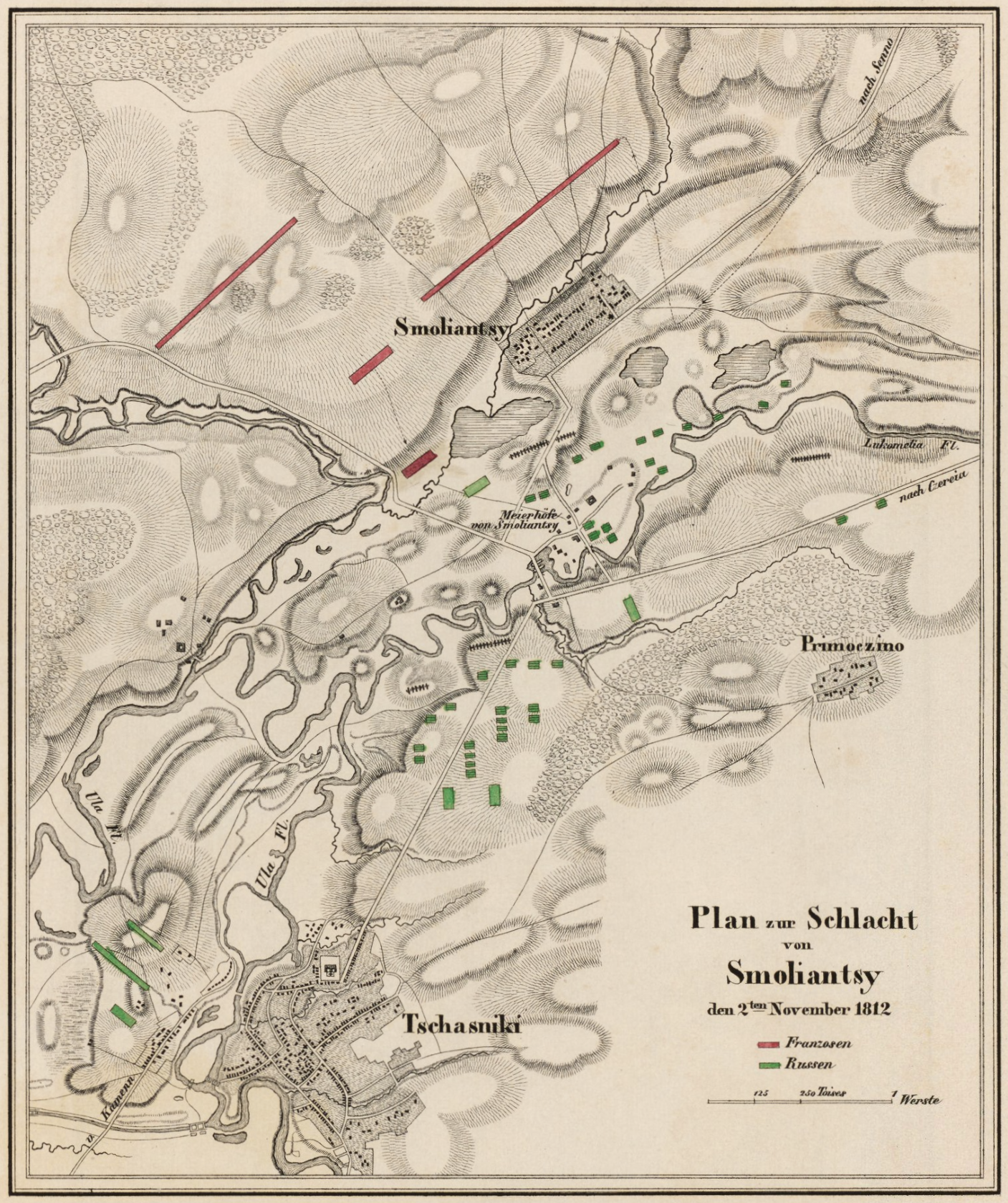
- German map of the battle (1843). The night bivouac of Napoleon's army during the retreat from Russia.
Date	13–14 November 1812 (Old Style date: 1–2 November 1812)
Location	Smolyany, Governorate of Vitebsk, Russian Empire (today Bol'shiye Smol'yantsy, Belarus) 54°50′N 29°11′E
Result	Russian victory

Belligerents
Russian Empire	(First French Empire) French Empire

Commanders and leaders
(Russian Empire) Peter Wittgenstein	(First French Empire) Claude Victor (First French Empire) Nicholas Oudinot

Strength
30,000 troops: more than 6,000 involved on the 1st day; unknown number involved on the 2nd day.	approx. 25,000 troops available: 6,000 involved on the 1st day; 5,000 involved on the 2nd day.

Casualties and losses
3,000	3,000

French invasion of Russia
current battle
Prussian corps
Napoleon
Austrian corps

At the Battle of Smoliani or Smolyany (N.S. November 13–14, 1812), the Russians under General Peter Wittgenstein defeated the French forces of Marshal Claude Victor and Marshal Nicholas Oudinot. This battle was the last effort of the French to reestablish their northern flank in Russia, known as the "Dvina Line". Previously, the French had been defeated in this sector at the Second Battle of Polotsk (October 18–20, 1812) and at the Battle of Czasniki (October 31, 1812). The site of the battle in today's Bol'shiye Smol'yantsy should not be confused with Smalyany.

== Background ==
Upon learning of Victor's defeat at the Battle of Czasniki, Napoleon – who was already distressed about the situation in the north due to the earlier French defeat at Polotsk – ordered Victor to assume the offensive at once and drive Wittgenstein back.

At the time of the Smoliani encounter, Napoleon was planning to lead his rapidly disintegrating Grande Armée to a safe haven in the west, such as Minsk. To execute this plan, the Grande Armée's planned route of retreat had to be secured. Wittgenstein's position at Czasniki was 31 miles (50 km) north of Borisov, a town Napoleon needed to cross the Berezina for the main French army to reach Minsk.

Victor, per Napoleon's orders, was to coordinate the actions of his IX corps with the VI corps and the II corps commanded by Marshal Oudinot. The initial French plan – ordered by Napoleon and endorsed by Victor, was not to attack Wittgenstein frontally, but for one corps to attack the Russians in the flank while the other conducted a frontal assault. This plan, however, was scuttled per the insistence of Oudinot, who thought it more advantageous to attack Wittgenstein head-on.

=== The contrasting moods in the Russian and French headquarters ===
Going into the action at Smoliani, the French commanders exhibited the hallmarks of leaders setting themselves up for failure: bad planning, indecision, and pessimism due to earlier reversals.

Historians have criticized Oudinot and Victor for not attempting a flanking maneuver against Wittgenstein. Victor has been criticized especially for indecision in his planning and execution of the Smoliani attack. Previously, at Czasniki, Victor had proven himself over-inclined to retreat in the face of just minor reversals.

The mood among the Russian leaders on the eve of the battle stood in stark contrast to that of the French.

In Wittgenstein's headquarters at this time, there existed a "sense of self-confidence and proud accomplishment", which had coalesced as a result of their repeated victories over the French in earlier battles. One notable work on 1812 describes the aura among Wittgenstein and his staff at this juncture as a sense of being "morally equal and often superior to the enemy." It is no wonder, perhaps, that Victor was hesitant in executing the task assigned to him by Napoleon.

=== Severe attrition among French forces ===
The French cause at Smoliani was also undermined by mounting attrition within their ranks.

In the two weeks following the action at Czasniki, Victor's force had suffered greatly from exposure to frost and disease. By November 10, only 25,000 troops remained under Victor's command, a development that increased Wittgenstein's margin of superiority over the French in this sector. As a result of being better supplied, better quartered, and more intelligently protected from the elements than their French foes, Wittgenstein's troops suffered less attrition from privation and the weather.

== The battle ==
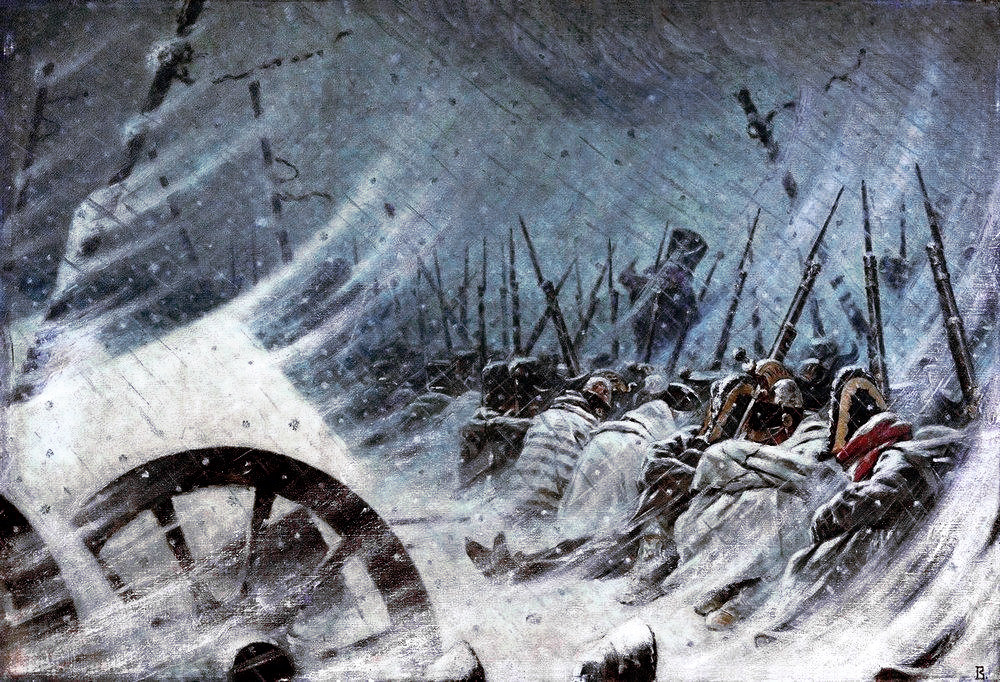
The night bivouac of Napoleon's army during the retreat from Russia.

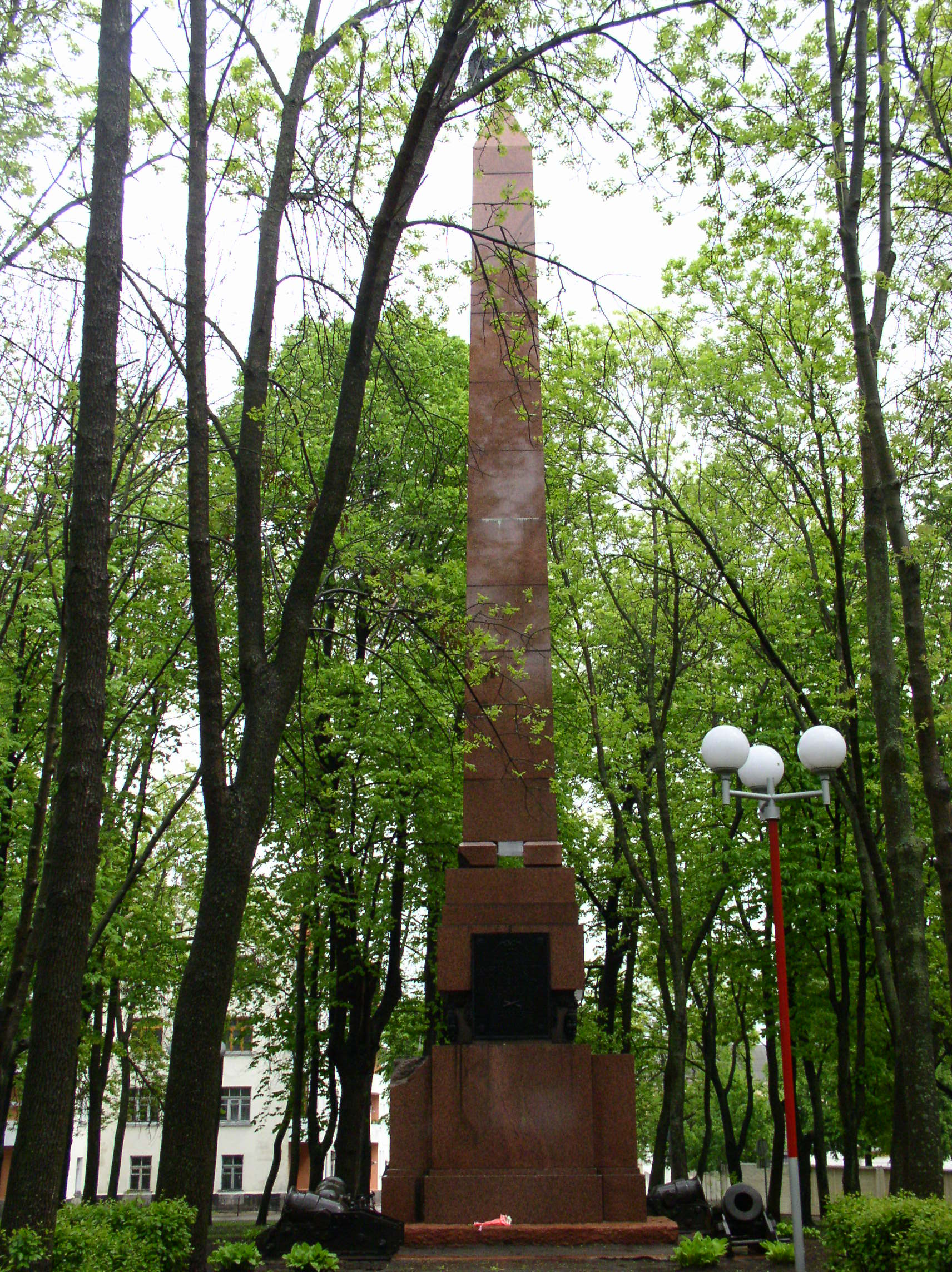
An obelisk commemorating the heroes of the Patriotic War of 1812, in Vitebsk. Unveiled in 1912.

The Battle of Smoliani commenced on November 13, at the nearby village of Axenzi, and initially the French were successful. Here the 6,000 troops of General Louis Partouneaux attacked Wittgenstein's advance guard, 6,000 strong, led by General Alexiev. Each side lost roughly 500 troops in this encounter, and despite being reinforced, the Russians were forced to retreat to Smoliani.

The next day, November 14, the combat intensified as 5,000 of Victor's troops attacked and captured Smoliani. After this, however, the French attacking force suffered a reversal, being repulsed on the Russian right wing and then losing Smoliani to Wittgenstein's counterattack. While this action was taking place, a small Russian detachment kept Oudinot's superior force in check at the village of Poczavizi, thereby preventing these troops from assisting Victor.

Although the action died down with each side in their original position, and the losses suffered by both were equal – 3,000 killed, wounded and taken prisoner – it was the French who very much had the worst of the scrap. The next day, November 15, Victor retreated 20 miles south to Chereja.

== Consequences ==
Although Wittgenstein did not immediately pursue his defeated enemy, by winning this battle, he retained the potential to attack the Grande Armée when it passed through Bobr, 40 miles (64 km) south of his position near Czasniki. That Victor and Oudinot retreated in the face of this big threat to the Grande Armée was another heavy blow to Napoleon. The Battle of Smoliani also ended, permanently, any hope the French had of reestablishing their northern "Dvina Line."

== See also ==
- List of battles of the French invasion of Russia

== Notes ==
Preceded by Battle of Vyazma	Napoleonic Wars; Battle of Smoliani	Succeeded by Battle of Krasnoi
