= Mannus Riedesel =

Mannus Riedesel (1662–1726) was a master builder in the early 18th century in the Counties of Wittgenstein and surrounding areas, now part of the district of Siegen-Wittgenstein in the state of North Rhine-Westphalia in the Federal Republic of Germany. At least ten structures that he built are known to exist, and are regarded as jewels of "half-timbered" Fachwerk construction." Though not well known outside Wittgenstein, his name and surviving structures are familiar to many there.

== Personal ==
Riedesel was born June 6, 1662 at the hamlet of Melbach/Balde to Heyrich Riedesel and his wife, Gerthrut Dickel, daughter of Johannes Dickel, as the first of at least five children. He was christened Johann Hermann, though he is generally known as Mannus. Even so, he signed himself as "Hermannus" on occasion and (like most of the world) even spelled Riedesel in various fashions. His father was in the service of the Counts of Sayn-Wittgenstein-Berleburg. He married for the first time in 1687 to Anna Ursula Dreisbach with whom he had at least two children. Following her death, he married again to Anna Katherine Grund in 1693, and they had three known children. His death is recorded at the Melbach on November 4, 1726. In 2024 a monument to Riedesel was dedicated at the ancient church in Raumland where he was baptized and buried (image and translation below).

He was literate and well-traveled, but nevertheless a subject of the Counts of Sayn-Wittgenstein. The argument has been made that he was descended from a line of the Riedesel zu Josbach, a once knightly family in Hesse and Westfalen, a collateral branch of a large Riedesel family.

More recently, a relationship to the ruling family of Sayn-Wittgenstein through his mother's side has been hypothesized. It is presumed his mother, Gerthrut Riedesel née Dickel is a granddaughter of Count Georg of Sayn-Wittgenstein (1524-1588), a Canon in Köln and Trier, through his illegitimate daughter Margareta (d. 1603), who married Johannes Dickel, himself a secretary, advisor and lawyer of her uncle, Louis I, Count of Sayn-Wittgenstein. This kind of ancestry would be consistent with his seemingly high status and literacy.

Riedesel used a variety of figures, but favored grapes and grapevines as symbols of fertility. Both human- and gargoyle-like faces adorn various structures. They are carved in the wood, as were inscriptions. The name of Mannus Riedesel appears on some, but not all, of his surviving buildings and in a variety of spellings. Today, the inscriptions and other ornamentation are brightly painted.

Mannus Riedesel Marker in Raumland
This plaque on a stone monument was installed at the ancient church in Raumland, Germany, in 2024. Riedesel was christened and buried there.	Mannus Riedesel June 6, 1662 - November 4, 1726 The most-significant master builder in Wittgenstein He was known for his artistically designed half-timbered structures. Mannus Riedesel lived in the hamlet of Melbach within the larger community of Erndtebrück-Balde. and was interred in the Raumland churchyard on November 5, 1726. Typical of his work are representations of wine grapes and imaginary, fantasy fruits. They make his structures easily recognizable and serve as symbols or landmarks of the region. A few of his most-important works include: The so-called school-chapel in Sassenhausen; The "Stoltz'sches" house in Bad Laasphe; The Ludwigsburg in Bad Berleburg; Hof Dambach outside Girkhausen; The "Fuchs'sches" house in Wunderthausen; The balcony of the Raumland church

== Ludwigsburg ==
East Wing

South Wing

Front Door

Perhaps the best known of Riedesel's work is a large, two-winged house in Bad Berleburg. According to an inscription, the older gabled wing was built by Mannus Riedesel in 1707. The newer wing was built in 1724. Graf Casimir zu Sayn-Wittgenstein ruled the County of Wittgenstein-Berleburg from 1712 to his death in 1741. Under the regency of his mother, Casimir initiated construction of the Ludwigsburg as a residence for his younger brother, Ludwig Francis (1694–1750). The main door to the original house features an angel's head, which in the local folklore is said to represent the young Ludwig. Their mother, Gräfin Hedwig Sophie von Lippe-Brake (1669-1738), moved her residence to the Ludwigsburg in 1725. Later descendants of what was called the line of Sayn-Wittgenstein-Ludwigsburg became officers in service of the Russian czar, and the house eventually passed out of the family. It is now a private residence and not open to sight-seeing.

It is situated along Odeborn creek, which flows through the city. The red-and-white Fachwerk is distinctive to the ruling family, as buildings of the time used only black-and-white coloration. The Ludwigsburg is richly decorated with carved ornamentation in the beams and corner posts.

== Hof Dambach ==
Hof Dambach

Hof Dambach came into existence as the home of a forester and huntsman in the employ of the Count of Sayn-Wittgenstein-Berleburg. The owners stood in a feudal relationship to the Count but had a few more privileges. Dambach had been a hamlet in medieval times, but was abandoned by 1500. Evidence of the village can be found in the valley of Dambach creek. The house and land are in an isolated clearing between Girkhausen and Wunderthausen (all within the larger Stadt of Bad Berleburg).

In 1711, Mannus Riedesel built the main house which was occupied by Georg Wilhelm Stark and his wife Elisabeth. Hof Dambach is decorated with various runes, figures, and other symbols of peace and fertility. There are other old out-buildings within the property (bakery, horse stall) but they were not built by Mannus Riedesel. Inside the main house, the hallway ran the full length of the house with living and sleeping rooms to either side.

Today Hof Dambach is a Pension serving tourists from Germany, the Netherlands, and elsewhere.

== Church in Sassenhausen ==
Church in Sassenhausen

Entrance; note inscription from the apocryphal book of Sirach

Balcony; note his signature

The small village of Sassenhausen is the site of a distinctive and still-functional church which Mannus Riedesel built in 1703. Behind the sanctuary is another room which was later built in to serve as a school. Wittgenstein was still recovering from the Thirty Years' War. The question is raised as to how a small village of only 14 dwellings and perhaps 90 people could afford to engage the best-known builder in Wittgenstein. But Mannus Riedesel had close family ties to Sassenhausen. His younger brothers had godparents from Sassenhausen, and his sister was related by marriage to another master carpenter in Sassenhausen. The Count provided the timber. With two or three journeymen and help from the villagers, the church was completed in the summer of 1703. The structure is widely known as the “Schulkapelle” (School/Chapel) but this a misnomer, insofar as Riedesel never intended such an architectural alteration which destroyed the precise mathematical proportions of the church.

One must enter the chapel through a low door that forces one to bow one's head. The altar rails are inscribed with early deacons of the church. The Counts of Wittgenstein were early converts to the Calvinist or Reformed confession, which they required of most of their subjects.

== Lotzes/Fuchs'ses in Wunderthausen ==
Lotzes/Fuchs'ses

The last house known to have been built by Mannus Riedesel sits on the main road through Wunderthausen. It was erected in 1726, the same year he died. Little detail is known of its construction. Lotzes is one of three old Fachwerk houses that survived the fires of the late 19th century.

== Stoltz'sches house in Laasphe ==
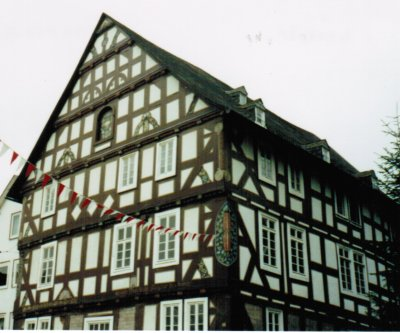
Stolz'sches in Laasphe

This is another grand town home built in 1705. Though not as large as the Ludwigsburg, it towers over the street. The corner posts are richly decorated in Mannus Riedesel's usual style. It was built for the wealthy brewer and distiller Joh. Adam Stoltz and his wife, Anna Elisabeth. It is said to have been the first house built outside the town gates.

== Hain-Hof in Puderbach ==
Hain Hof in Puderbach

Hain-Hof, a large farmhouse in Puderbach at Eschenstraße 6 built in 1712.

== Others ==
The barn built in 1702 at his home in the Melbach; some of the beams are richly decorated (not readily accessible to the public, as it is privately owned).

The house at Parkstraße 5 in Bad Berleburg built in 1725; it was built for a lieutenant in the Count's small guard contingent who died young; details of the widow's correspondence with the Count asking for help as well as details of the construction costs have been preserved.

The pastor's house in Wingeshausen is believed to be one of his works as well, though it was torn down in 1912.
