= Anna Baryatinskaya =

Russian countess

Countess Anna Ivanovna Tolstaya
- Countess of the Russian Empire
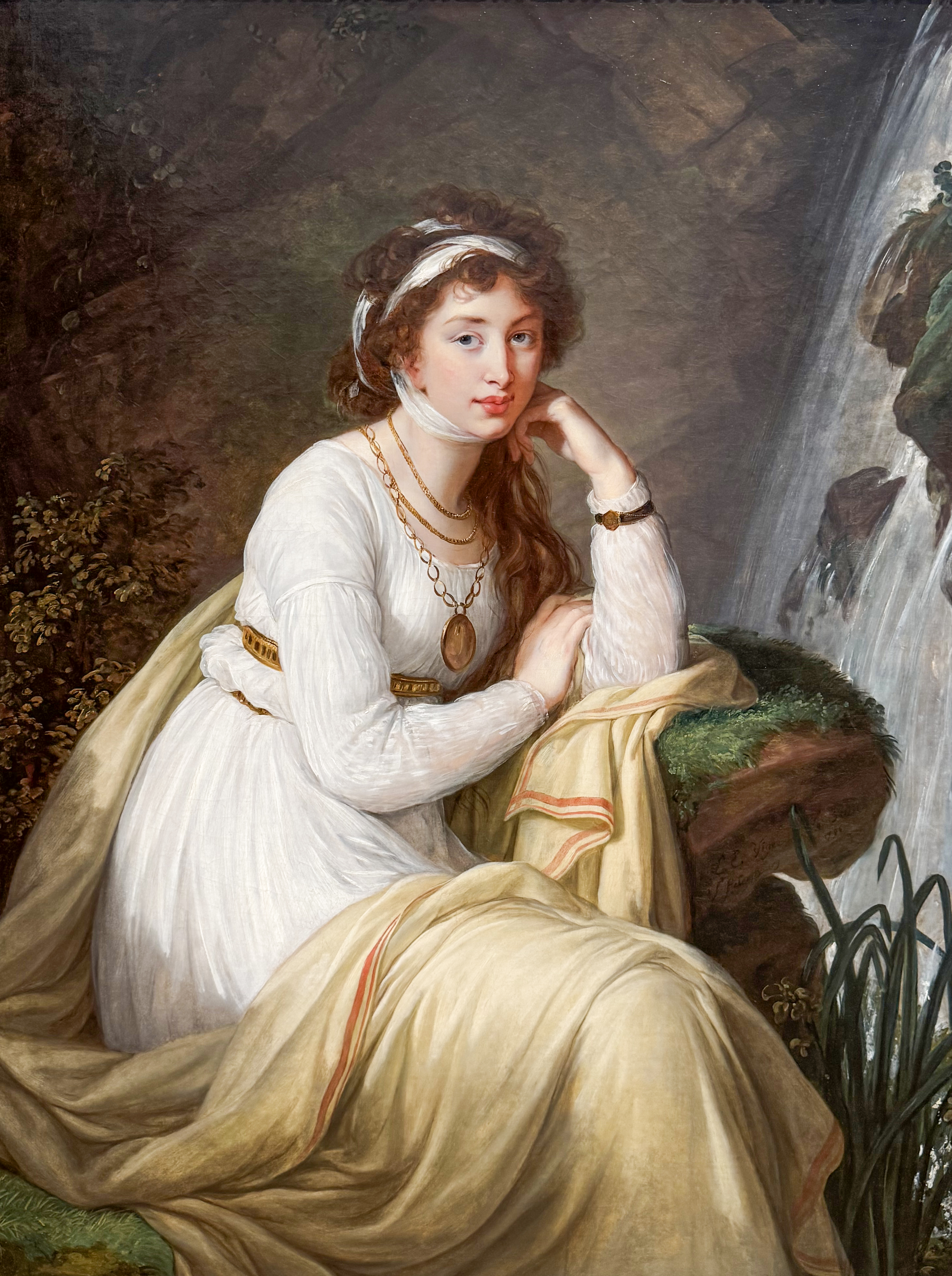
- Portrait by Louise Élisabeth Vigée Le Brun (1796)
- Full name: Anna Ivanovna Tolstaya
- Native name: А́нна Ива́новна Толста́я
- Born: Princess Anna Ivanovna Baryatinskaya; 5 December 1774; Saint Petersburg, Russian Empire
- Died: 12 April 1825 (aged 50); Paris, France
- Buried: Cimetière du Mont-Valérien
- Noble family: Baryatinsky family (by birth); Tolstoy family (by marriage)
- Spouse: Nikolai Alexandrovich Tolstoy (m. 1787; died 1816)
- Issue: Ekaterina Tolstaya; Eudokia Tolstaya; Alexander Nikolayevich Tolstoy; Emmanuel Tolstoy
- Father: Ivan Baryatinsky
- Mother: Catherine Petrovna Holstein-Beck of Oldenburg

Countess Anna Ivanovna Tolstaya Russian: А́нна Ива́новна Толста́я, née Princess Baryatinskaya (Russian: Баря́тинская; December 5, 1774 - April 12, 1825) was the sister of prince Ivan Baryatinsky, wife of Marshal Nikolai Alexandrovich Tolstoy (1765–1816), a close friend of the Empress Elizabeth Alexeyevna and memoirist Countess Varvara Golovina.

== Biography ==
Daughter of Prince Ivan Baryatinsky, the Russian ambassador in Paris, and Princess Catherine Petrovna Holstein-Beck of Oldenburg, Princess Baryatinskaya held a high position in Russian society. To be invited to her house was considered a great honor. Wealth allowed her to live well and in great style. The poet Ivan Dolgorukov was a frequent guest of Princess Baryatinskaya; he participated in performances at her home and took care of her daughter.

In 1787, Anna became the wife of Count Nikolai Alexandrovich Tolstoy. In May 1793 he was appointed chamberlain to Grand Duke Alexander Pavlovich, the future Alexander I of Russia.

Countess Anna Tolstoy became a member of Grand Duke Alexander Pavlovich's court. She developed a friendship with the Grand Duchess Elizabeth Alexeievna, the former Louise of Baden, who called her la longue (long), as Anna was very tall. This became her nickname amongst her friends.

== Family life ==
The family life of Countess Anna Tolstoy was not happy. Grieving the death in 1797 of her youngest daughter Eudoxia, she and her husband quarreled. She fell in love with the English envoy Charles Whitworth, 1st Earl Whitworth, who was a frequent visitor to her house. At the time, he was leading a conspiracy against the Emperor Paul I of Russia, with Nikita Petrovich Panin and Admiral José de Ribas. The intrigue was discovered, and Emperor Paul I asked the British government to remove the ambassador in 1800.

Her husband's jealousy, quick temper and unbridled nature led Anna to decide to leave. With the help of her brother-in-law's, mistress, actress Madame Chevalier, Anna obtained the consent of the Emperor to depart abroad. She left in 1800 and moved to Berlin. But Countess Tolstoy was disappointed in her feelings for Whitworth, who in April 1801 in London married the widowed Duchess of Dorset.

After Paul I's death in March 1801, at the request of the Empress Elizabeth Alexeievna, Countess Tolstoy returned to her husband in Russia. She was present at the coronation of Tsar Alexander I of Russia in Moscow, but soon went abroad again with her children and traveled extensively in Europe. She remained a lifelong friend of Empress Elizabeth. Her letters to the Empress were published in 1909 by Grand Duke Nikolai Mikhailovich.

Countess Tolstoy's friendship with the French émigrée, Louise Emmanuel de Chartillon, Princess de Tarant, and others in Saint Petersburg's Catholic world led her to convert from Russian Orthodoxy to Catholicism.

Widowed in December 1816, Countess Tolstoy died in Paris on April 12, 1825, and was buried in the Cimetière du Mont-Valérien.

== Children ==
She had two sons and two daughters:

- Ekaterina (15 August 1789 - 11 February 1870), grew up near the Court. Her name is often found in the correspondence of the Empress Elizabeth. She was married to Lieutenant General Prince Constantine Ksaverevichem Lubomirski (1786–1870), and had a son and six daughters.
- Eudokia (1793–1797)
- Alexander Nikolayevich Tolstoy (1793–1866), was married to Princess Anna Mikhailovna Scherbatova, died in Nice.
- Emmanuel (1802–1825), is buried in the Volkov Lutheran Cemetery in Saint Petersburg.

== Notes ==
- Dolgorukov IM temples of my heart, or a dictionary of all those with which I have been in various ways in the course of my life -. M., 1997.
- The life story of a noble woman. - New York: New Literary Review, 1996.-P.125.
- Gr. Prince. Nikolai Mikhailovich. Elizabeth A., wife of Emperor Alexander I. V.1. - S.262-263.
- Russian portraits of the 18th and 19th centuries. T.4.Vyp.1. Number 18.
- F. G. Golovkin. Court and reign of Paul I. Portraits, the memories. -M, 2003, p. 289.
