= Ludwig von Borstell =

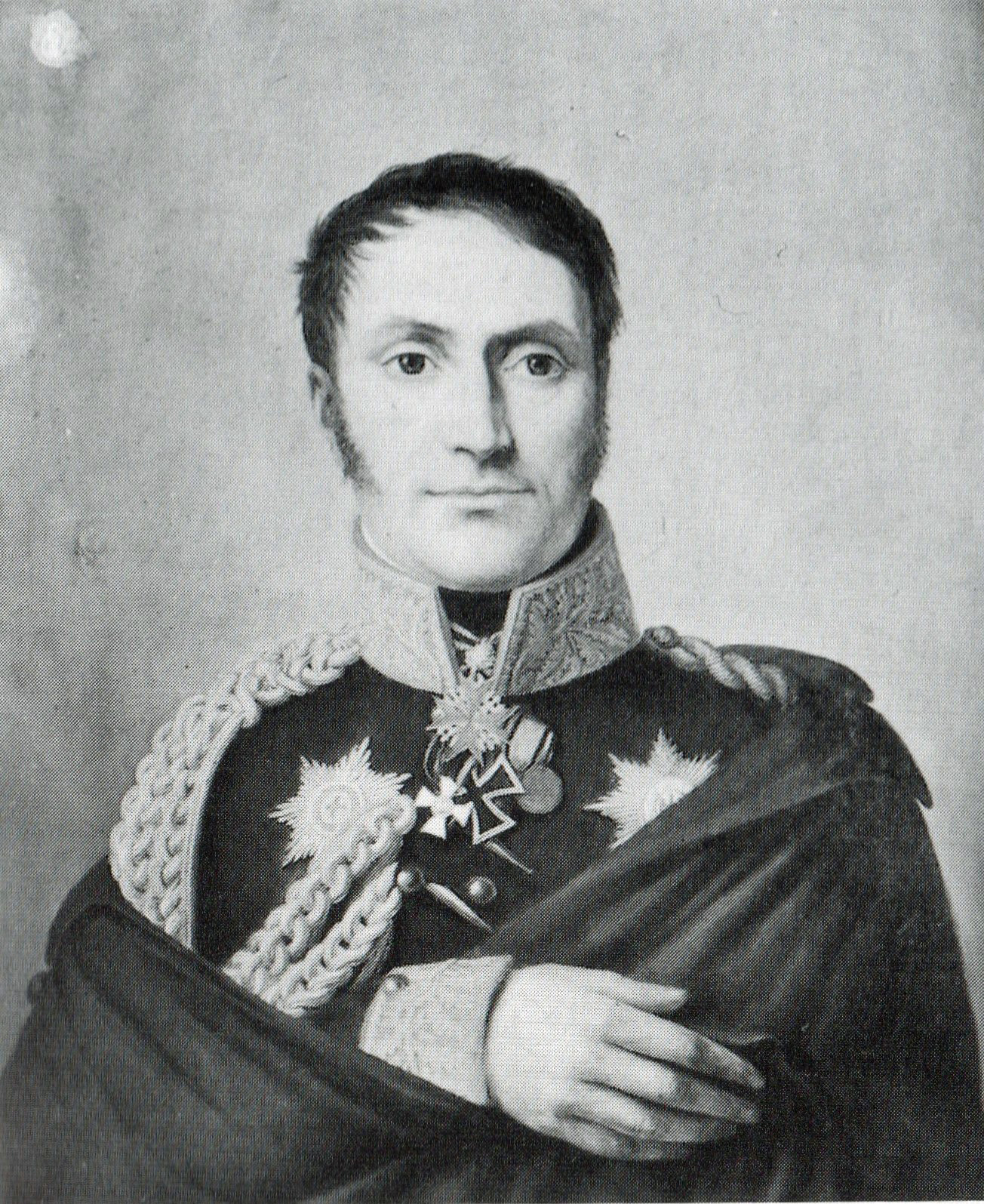

Karl Leopold Heinrich Ludwig von Borstell (born 30 December 1773 in Tangermünde; died 9 May 1844 in Berlin) was a Prussian General of the Cavalry and member of the then Prussian State Council.
