= Peter Wittgenstein =

German prince (1769–1843); field marshal in Russia

- 1st Prince of Sayn-Wittgenstein-Ludwigsburg-Berleburg
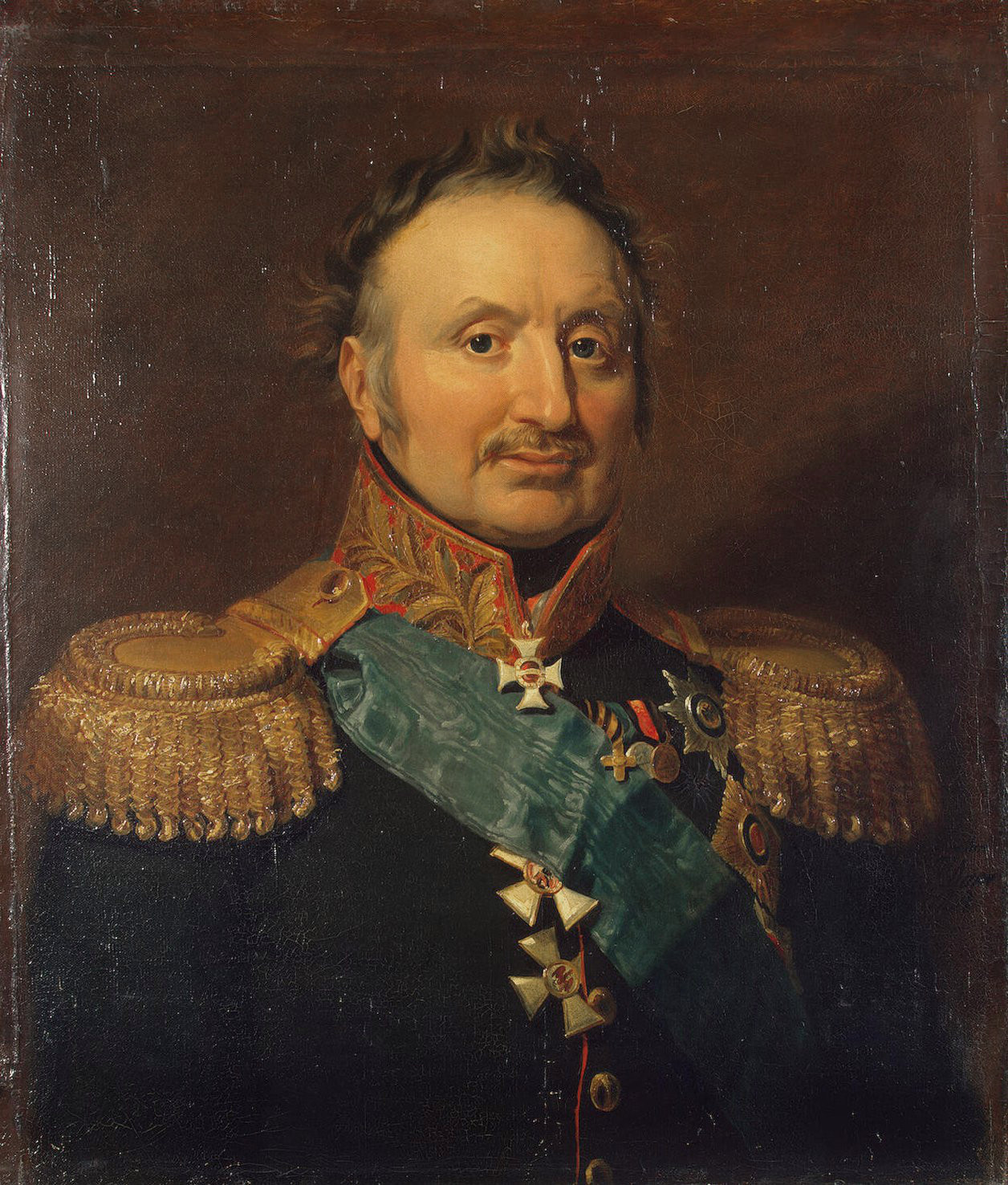
- Portrait by George Dawe (c. 1819–1825)
- Born: 17 January [O.S. 6] 1769; Pereyaslavl, Kiev Governorate, Russian Empire
- Died: 11 June 1843 (aged 74); Lemberg, Kingdom of Galicia and Lodomeria, Austrian Empire
- Spouse: Antonia Cäcilie Snarska (m. 1798)
- Issue: Prince Ludwig; Prince Stanisalus; Princess Emilie; Prince Alexander; Prince Peter; Prince Georg; Prince Alexei; Prince Nikolaus; Princess Maria; Princess Elizabeth; Princess Antonia
Names
- Louis Adolf Peter; German: Ludwig Adolf Peter; Russian: Pyotr Christianovich
- House: Sayn-Wittgenstein
- Father: Christian Louis Casimir, 2nd Count of Sayn-Wittgenstein-Ludwigsburg-Berleburg
- Mother: Countess Amalie Ludowika Finck von Finckenstein
- Religion: Lutheranism
- Military career
- Allegiance: Russian Empire
- Branch: Cavalry
- Service years: 1789–1829
- Rank: General-Field Marshal
- Nickname: Saviour of St. Petersburg (for the battle of Klyastitsy)
- Conflicts: Tree-like list: Kościuszko Uprising; Battle of Praga; Persian Expedition of 1796; Storming of Derbent; Napoleonic Wars; War of the Third Coalition; Battle of Amstetten; Battle of Dürenstein; Battle of Austerlitz; Russo-Turkish War (1806–1812); War of the Fourth Coalition; Russian Campaign; Battle of Klyastitsy; Battles of Polotsk; First Battle of Polotsk; Second Battle of Polotsk; Battle of Chashniki; Battle of Smoliani; Battle of Berezina; War of the Sixth Coalition; Battle of Möckern; Battle of Lützen; Battle of Bautzen; Battle of Dresden; Battle of Liebertwolkwitz; Battle of the Nations; Battle of Mormant; Battle of Bar-sur-Aube; Russo-Turkish War (1828–1829)

Louis Adolf Peter, 1st Prince of Sayn-Wittgenstein-Ludwigsburg-Berleburg (Note: German: Ludwig Adolf Peter Fürst zu Sayn-Wittgenstein-Berleburg; Russian: Пётр Христианович Витгенштейн, romanized: Pjotr Khristianovič Vitgenštejn; Pyotr Christianovich Wittgenstein.) (17 January [O.S. 6 January] 1769 – 11 June 1843), better known as Peter Wittgenstein in English, was a prince of the German dynasty of Sayn-Wittgenstein and field marshal in the Imperial Russian Army during the Napoleonic Wars. He was nicknamed the Saviour of Saint-Petersburg.

== Early life ==
Born Ludwig Adolf Peter Graf zu Sayn-Wittgenstein-Ludwigsburg-Berleburg, he was descended from a family of ruling German Counts whose seat was in Berleburg (present day North Rhine-Westphalia, Germany). His parents were Count Christian Louis Casimir of Sayn-Wittgenstein-Ludwigsburg and his first wife, Countess Amalie Ludowika Finck von Finckenstein (1740–1771).

== Military career ==
Enrolled as a sergeant in the Semyonovsky Regiment of the Imperial Russian Army at the age of 12 in 1781, Wittgenstein began actual military service as a Wachtmeister in the Life Guard Horse Regiment in 1789. In 1793 he gained promotion to Major in the Ukrainian Light Cavalry Regiment. He fought with the unit in the Kościuszko Uprising of 1794. Promoted to the rank of colonel in 1798, and to major general in 1799, in 1800 he took command of the Mariupolski Hussars Regiment.

In 1805 he fought at Austerlitz, in 1806 against the Turks, and in 1807 against Napoleon at Friedland and against the Swedes in Finland.

In the war of 1812 he commanded the right wing of the Russian Army in the First and Second battle of Polotsk, as well as at Chashniki and Smolyany. The fighting at Polotsk (more precisely, near Klyastitsy) decided the fate of Saint Petersburg and earned Wittgenstein the title of "Saviour of Saint-Petersburg". Emperor Alexander I of Russia awarded him the Order of St. George. He tried to combine with Pavel Chichagov at the Battle of Berezina (November 1812), and later combined with the Prussian army corps under Ludwig Yorck von Wartenburg.

In the campaign of 1813 in January, he took over the command of the Russian army after Kutuzov's death in April 1813, and commanded the Russian army at Möckern, where he also led the Prussians, Lützen and Bautzen. But after the defeats of the Spring campaign (Lützen and Bautzen), he laid down this command and led an army corps during the Battle of Dresden (August 1813) and the Battle of Leipzig (October 1813).

In the campaign of 1814, he led the 6th Corps under Schwarzenberg and was severely wounded at Bar-sur-Aube (27 February 1814).

In 1823 he was promoted Field Marshal, and in 1828 he was appointed to command the Russian army in the war against Turkey. But ill-health soon obliged him to retire. In 1834 King Frederick William III of Prussia granted him the title of Fürst (Prince) zu Sayn-Wittgenstein.

== Family ==
On 27 June 1798 he married Polish noblewoman Antonia Cäcilie Snarska (1779–1855) and had in this marriage 11 children. He died on 11 June 1843 in Lemberg, where he looked after estates of his son Ludwig. One of his daughters-in-law was Carolyne zu Sayn-Wittgenstein.

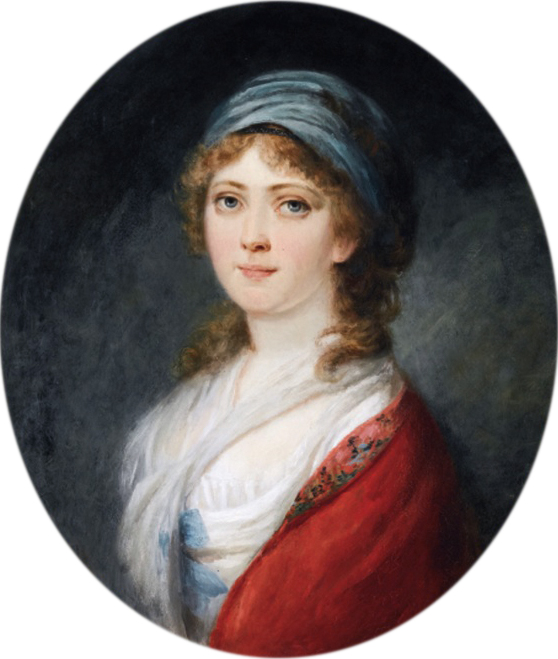
Countess Antonia Cäcilie Snarska (wife)

== Gallery ==
Paintings of Wittgenstein
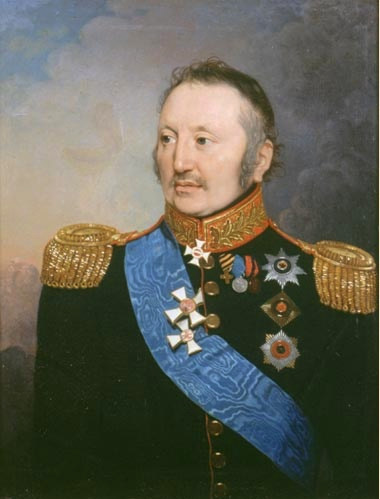
H1 of the 19th c.

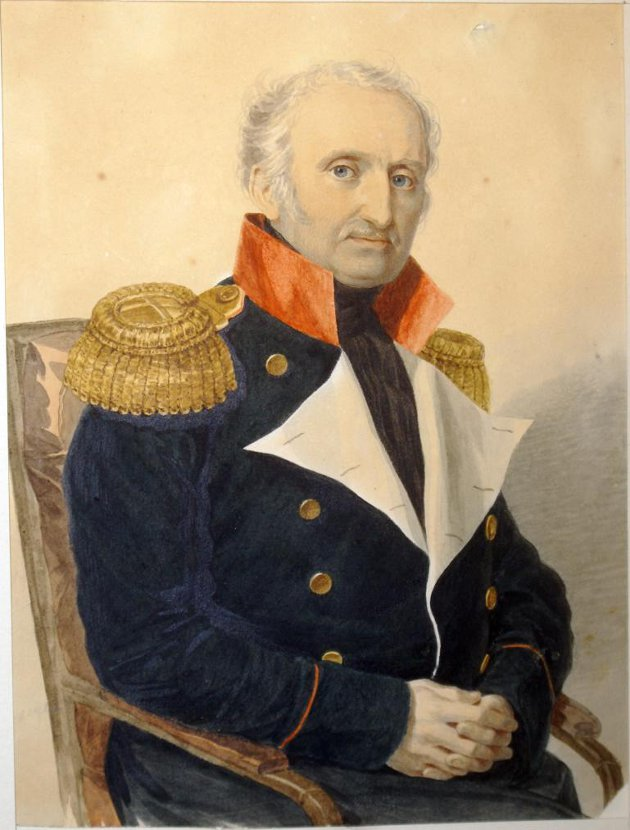
H1 of the 19th c.

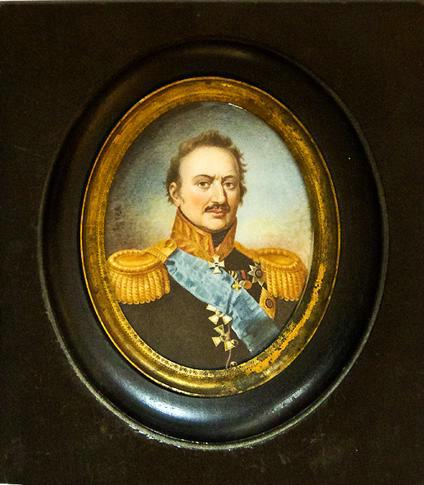
H1 of the 19th c.

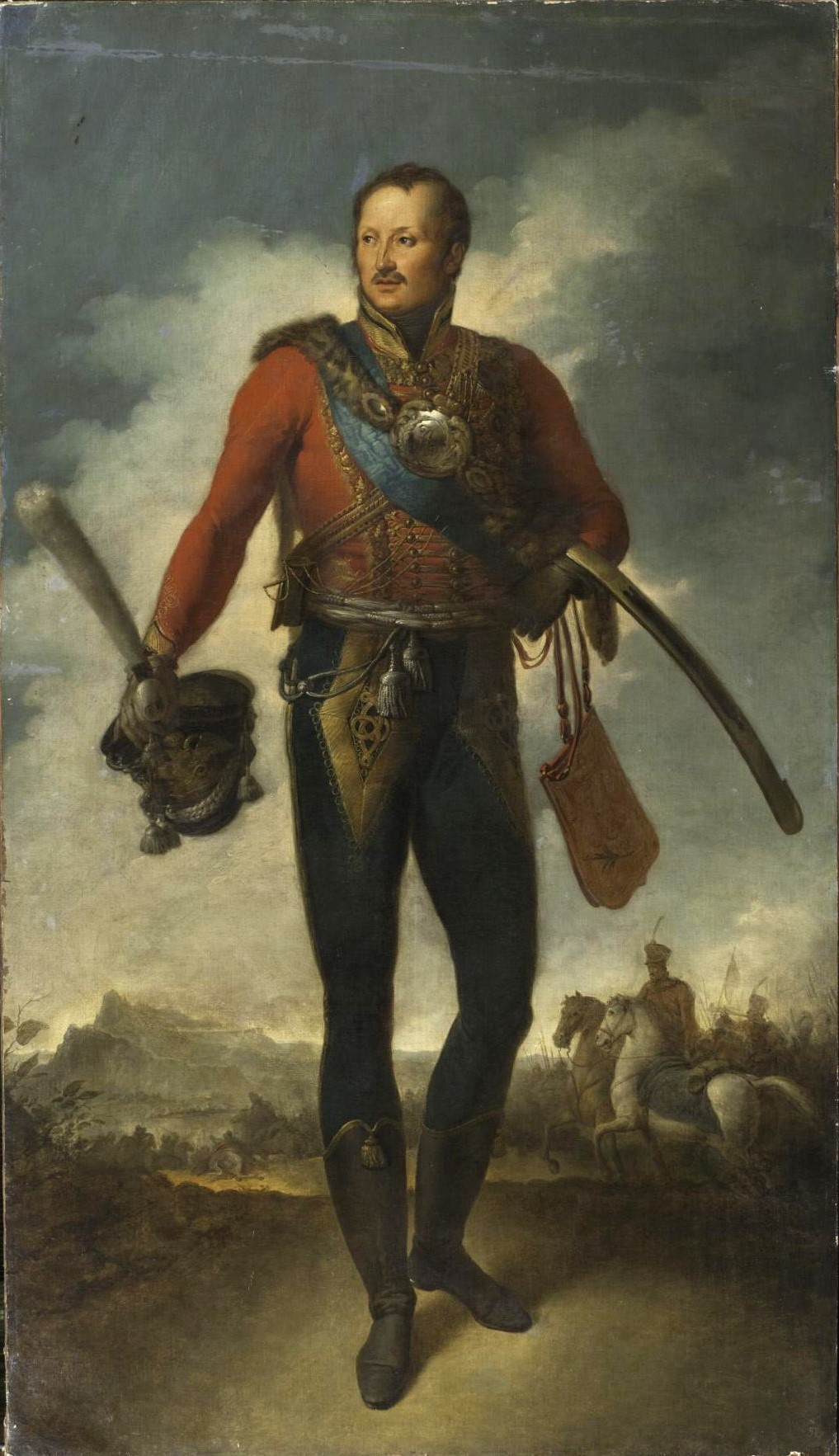
1813

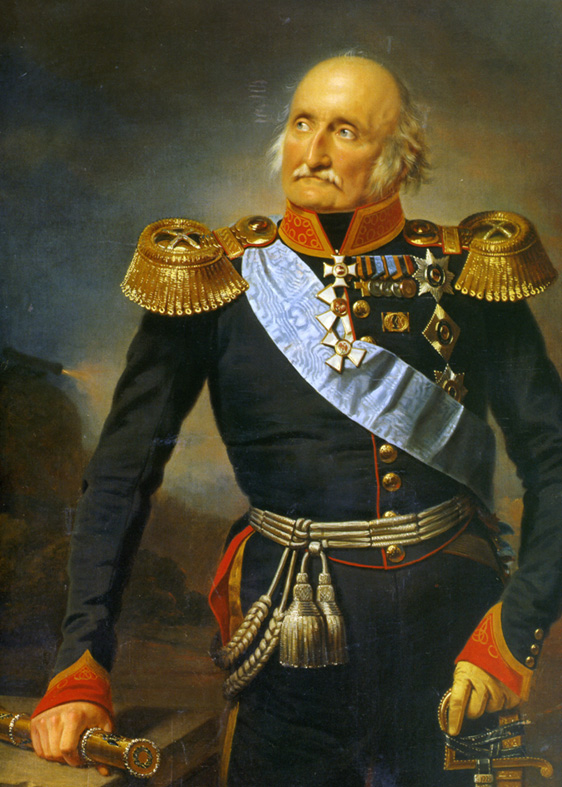
1853

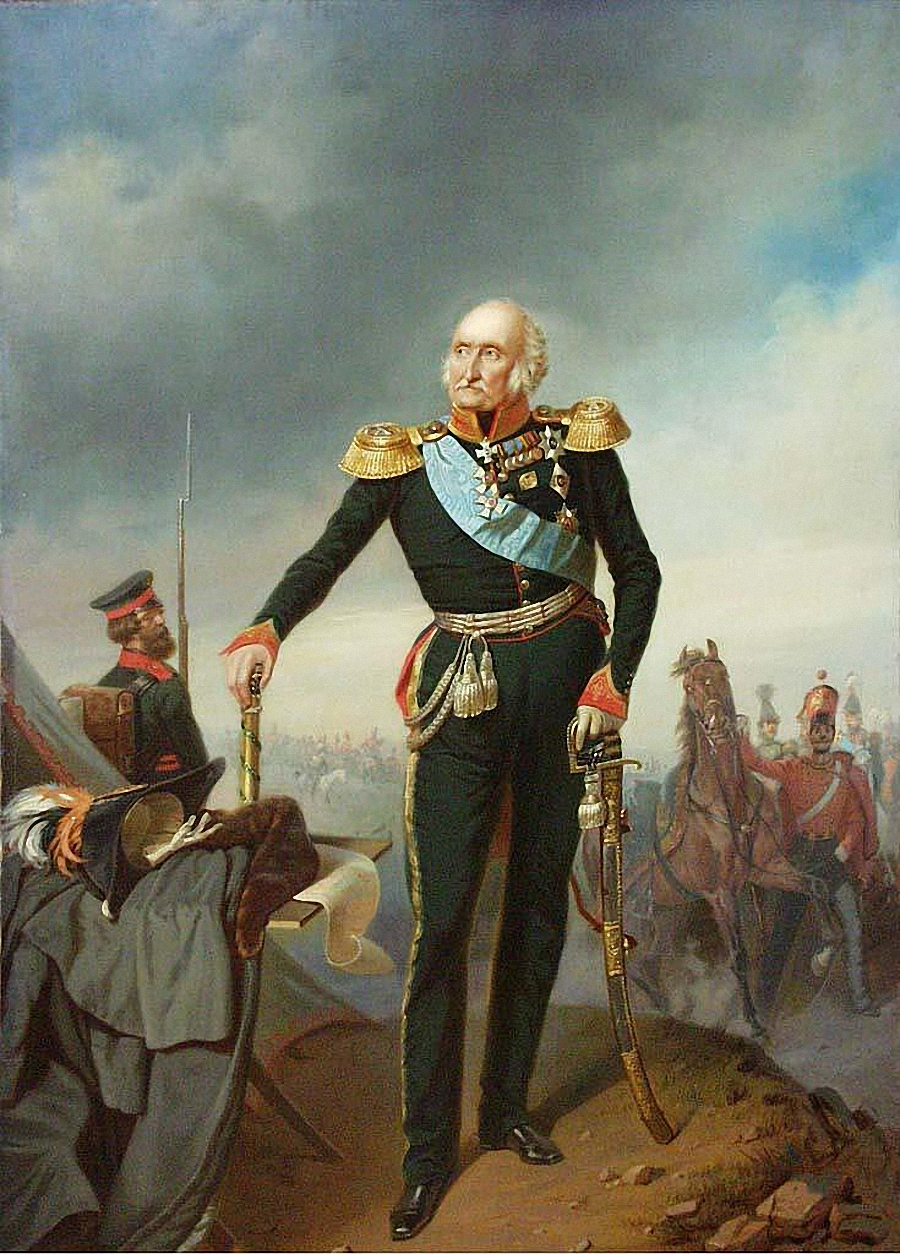
between 1860 and 1879

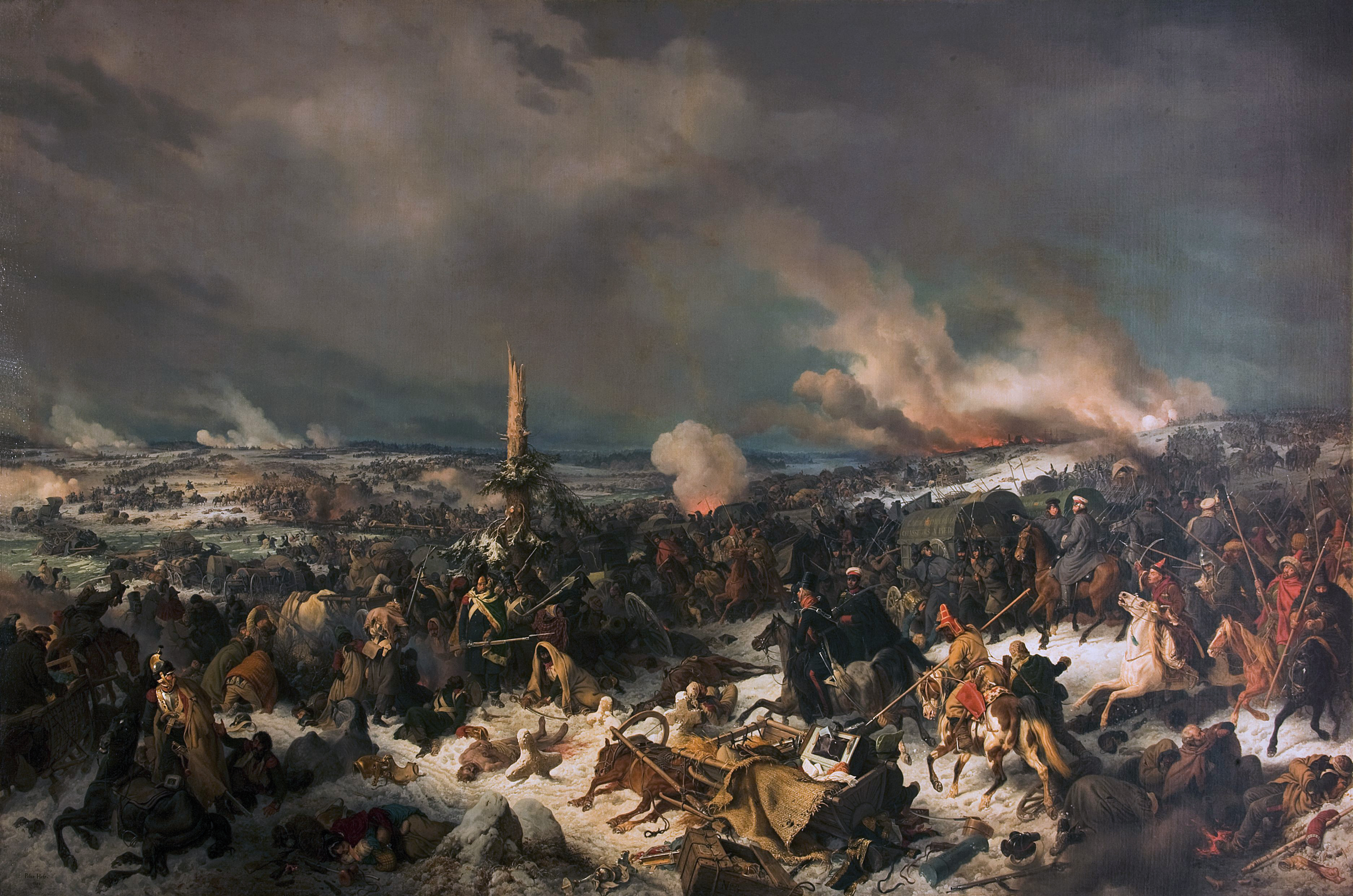
Crossing the Berezina River by Peter von Hess, 1844. Wittgenstein is on the right in the foreground.
Monuments of Wittgenstein
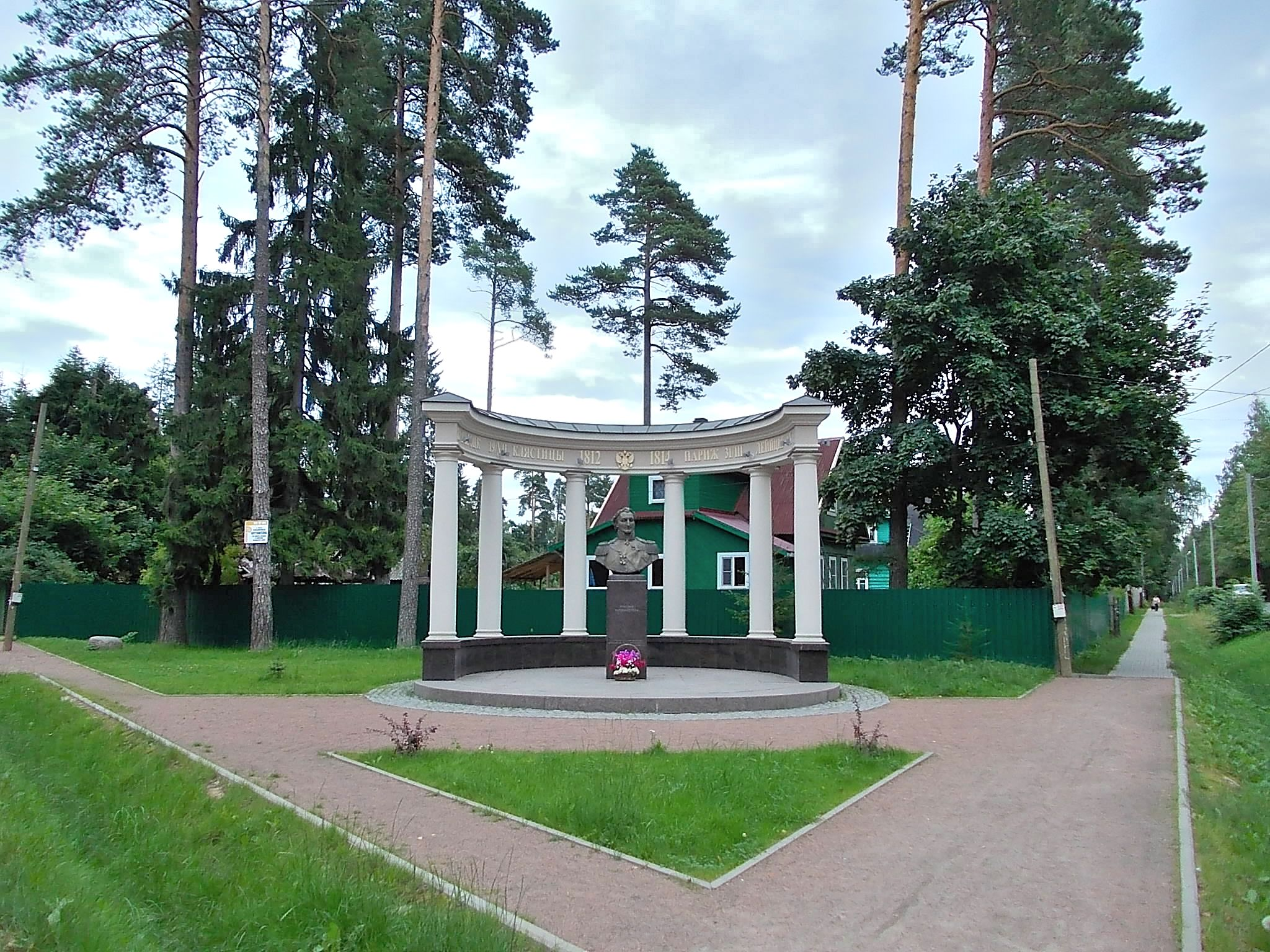
Siversky

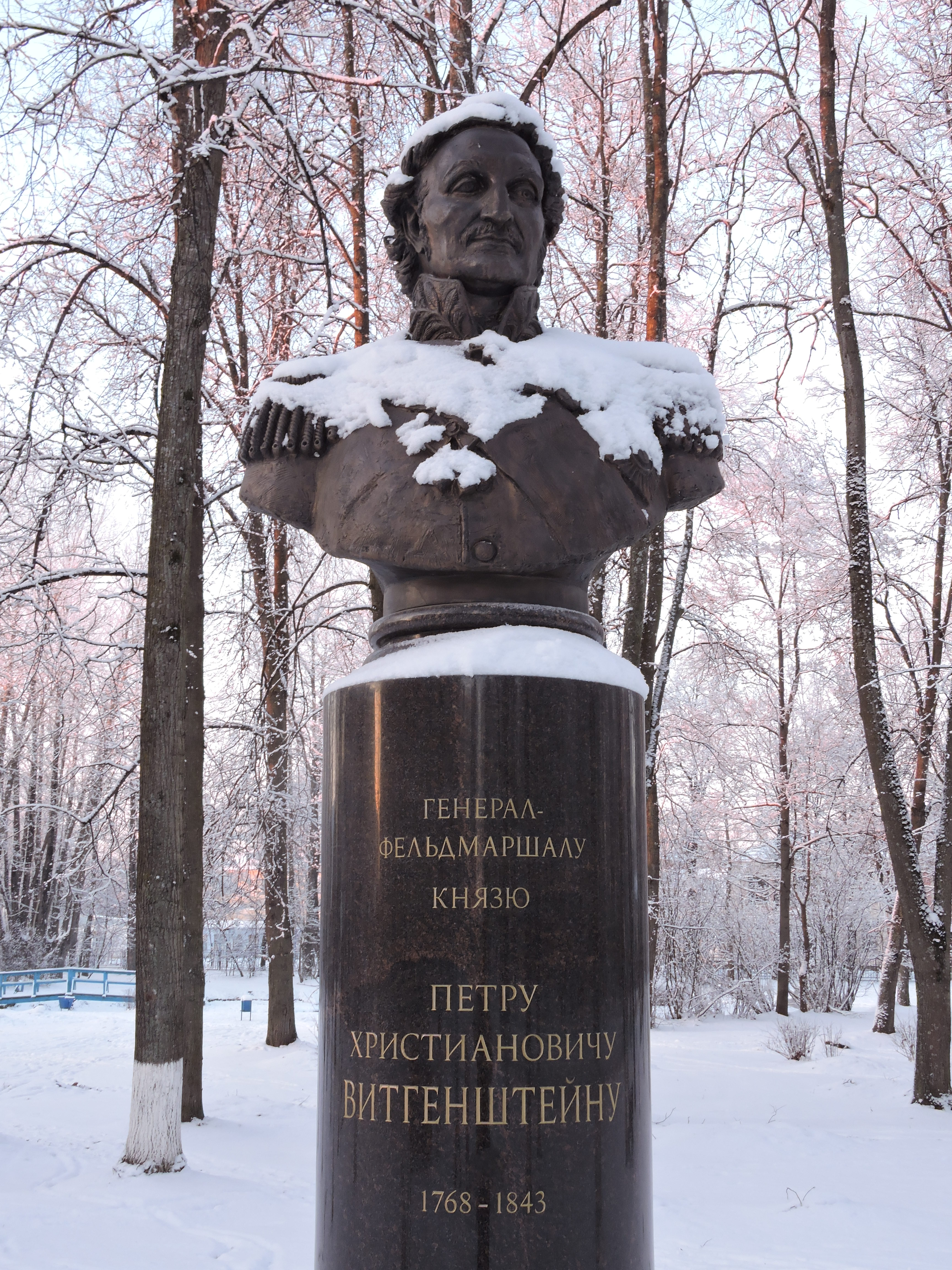
Pechory

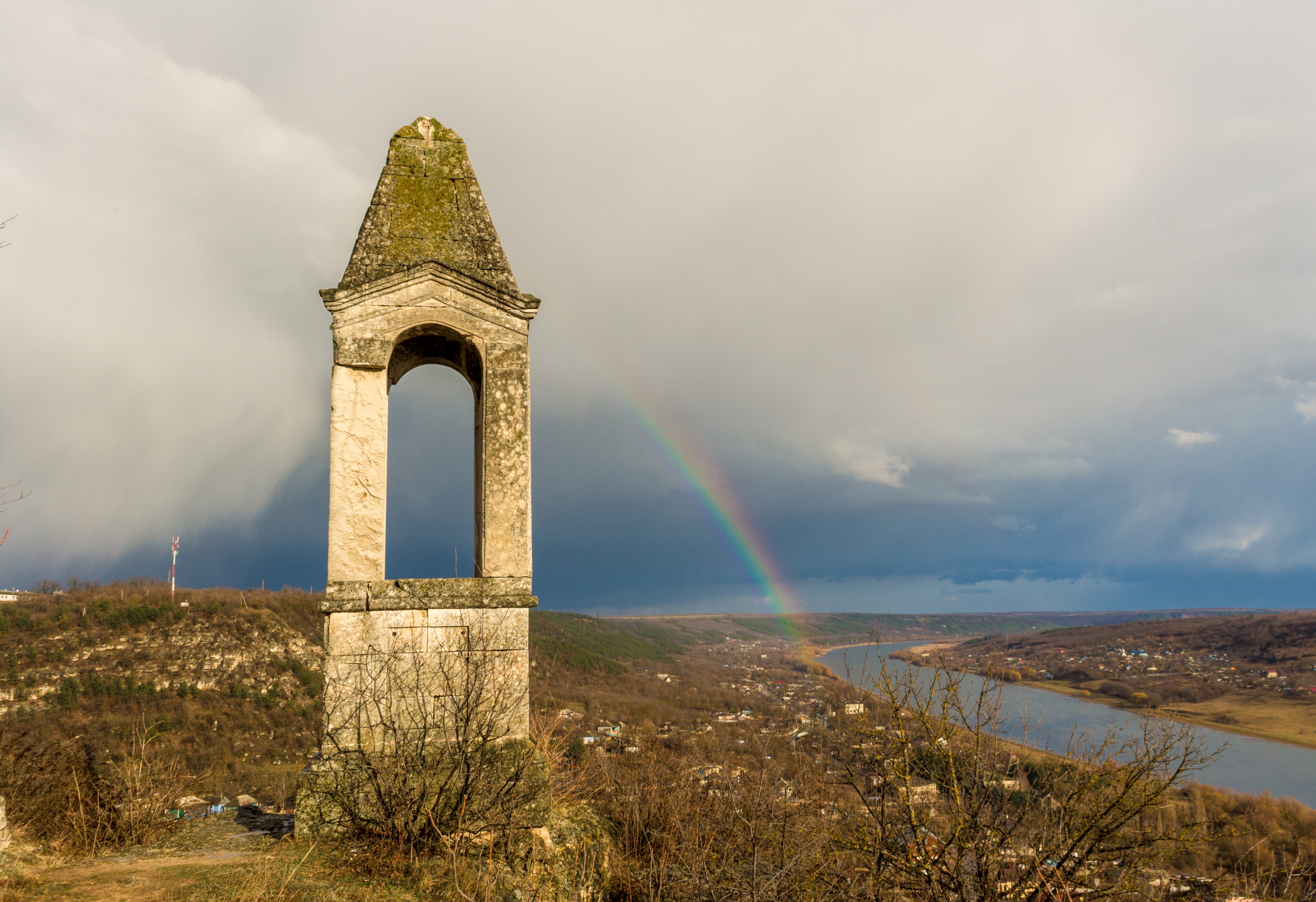
Stroiești
