= Princess Catherine of Schleswig-Holstein-Sonderburg-Beck =

German noblewoman (1750–1811)

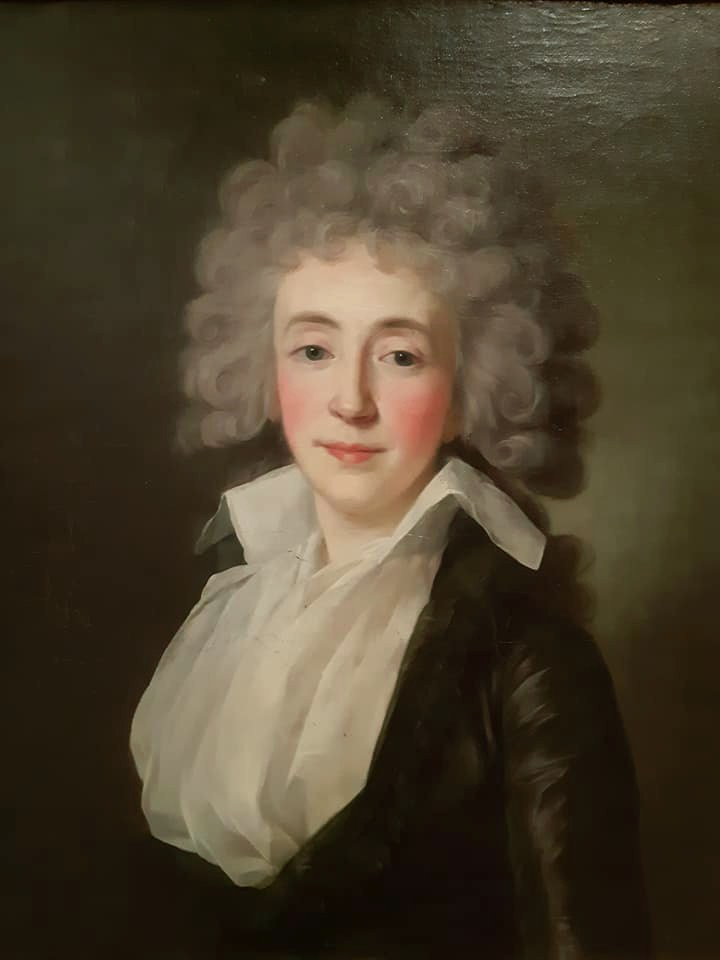
- Portrait by Jean-Louis Voille, 1791
- Born: 23 February 1750; Reval, Russian Empire
- Died: 20 December 1811 (aged 61); Berlin, Kingdom of Prussia
- Spouse: Prince Ivan Sergeevich Baryatinsky (m. 1767; sep. 1774)
- Issue: Prince Ivan Ivanovich Baryatinsky; Countess Anna Tolstaya
- House: Schleswig-Holstein-Sonderburg-Beck
- Father: Peter August, Duke of Schleswig-Holstein-Sonderburg-Beck
- Mother: Countess Natalia Nikolaievna Golovina

Princess Catherine of Schleswig-Holstein-Sonderburg-Beck (23 February 1750 – 20 December 1811), was a German noblewoman and member of the House of Schleswig-Holstein-Sonderburg-Beck. Through her marriage she became Princess Baryatinskaya, being mostly known as Princess Ekaterina Petrovna Barjatinskaya.

== Life ==
=== Early years ===
Born in Estonian city of Reval (now Tallinn), Catherine was the third child and only daughter of Prince Peter August of Schleswig-Holstein-Sonderburg-Beck, who was a Russian field marshal and Governor of Estonia, and his second wife, Countess Natalia Nikolaievna Golovina (1724-1767). She had two older full-brothers: Peter (1 February 1743 – 3 January 1751) and Alexander (born and died 1744), neither of whom survived infancy; from her father's first marriage with Princess Sophie of Hesse-Philippsthal (1695-1728) she had three half-siblings: Karl (October 1724 – March 1726), Ulrike Amelie Wilhelmine (20 May 1726 – died shortly after) and Karl Anton August (10 August 1727 – 12 September 1759), who was the only of her siblings who reached adulthood but died when Catherine was still a child.

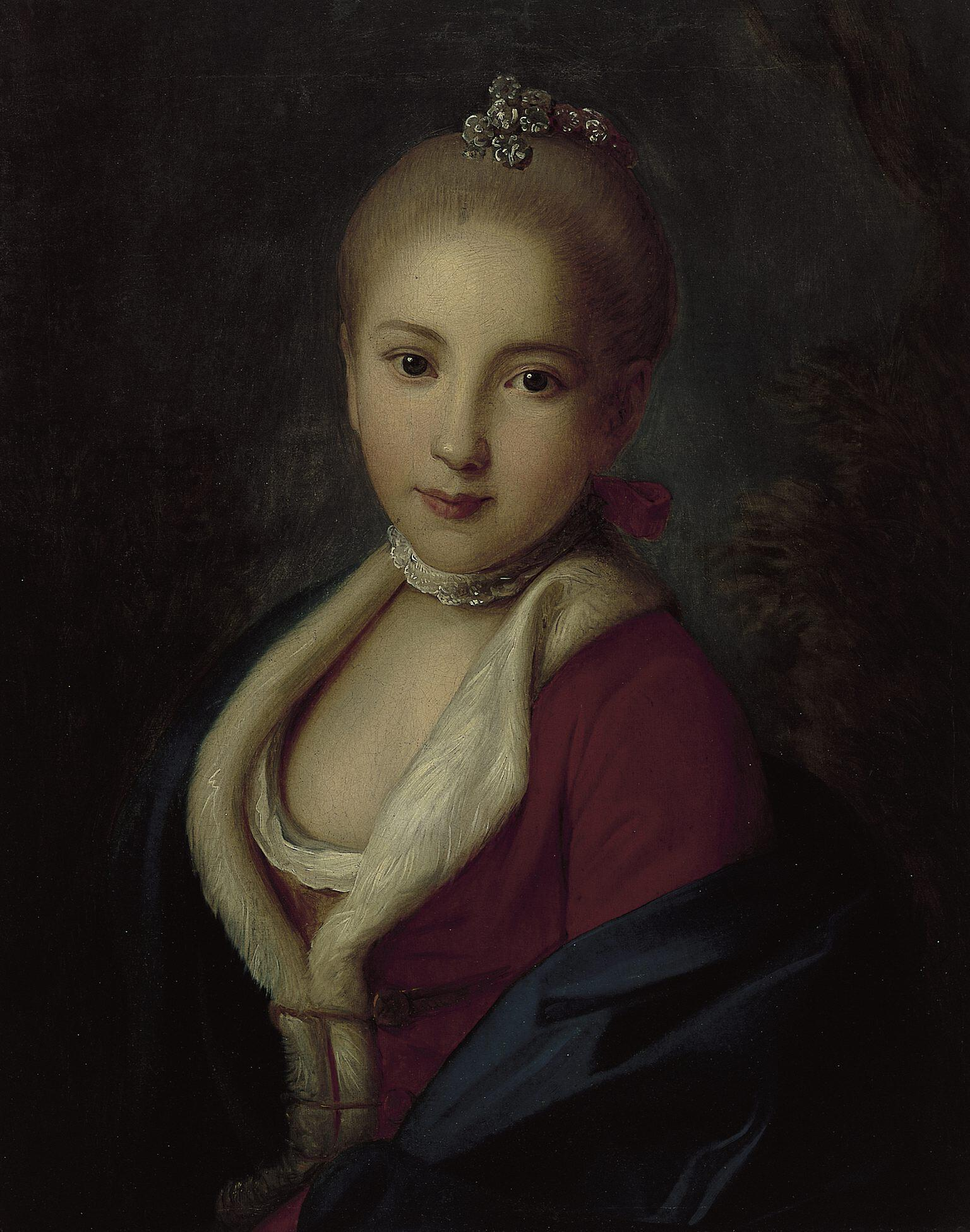
Portrait by Pietro Rotari, ca. 1761/1762.

On her father's side, Catherine belonged to the Beck branch of the Schleswig-Holstein-Sonderburg line of the House of Oldenburg being, in unbroken male-line, a descendant of King Frederick I of Denmark through his second son Johann II, Duke of Schleswig-Holstein-Haderslev and also she was distantly related to Emperor Peter III of Russia (born Charles Peter Ulrich of Schleswig-Holstein-Gottorp; he was a descendant of Johann II's younger brother Adolf, Duke of Holstein-Gottorp). In addition, she was related with King Christian IX of Denmark and Russian Empress Maria Feodorovna (Dagmar of Denmark), who were descendants of her half-nephew Friedrich Karl Ludwig.

On her mother's side, Catherine was the great-granddaughter of Count Fyodor Alexeyevich Golovin; his son, Count Nikolai Fyodorovich Golovin (1695-1745), left a will, according to which he bequeathed all his fortune to his illegitimate children who lived in Denmark. However, after his death, Empress Elizabeth of Russia disregarded the will and ordered to give the village of Khovrino (now Grachevka) near Moscow with the entire inheritance to Count Nikolai's only legitimate child with his wife, Sophie Pushkina (1700-1745), Countess Natalia Nikolaievna Golovina (1724-1767) (Catherine's mother). Countess Natalia died on 8 January 1767, leaving 16-years-old Catherine as a wealthy heiress.

Catherine's parents where supporters of the Emperor Peter III. In January 1760, 10-years-old Catherine was awarded by the Emperor with the Order of Saint Catherine in the rank of Dame Grand Cross. Two years later, 12-years-old Catherine and her parents were on one of the galleys that accompanied the Emperor on the day of the coup, 28 June 1762, during his flight to Kronstadt.

=== Marriage ===
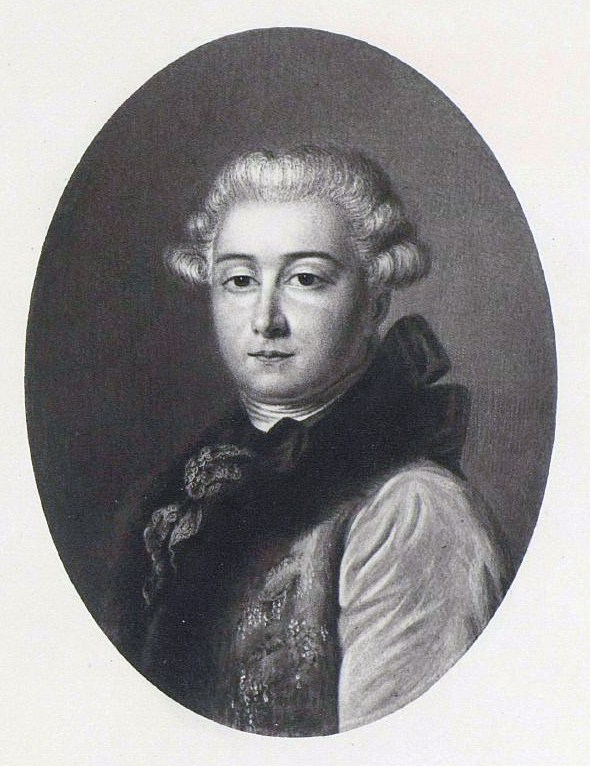
Prince Ivan Sergeevich Baryatinsky, ca. 1811. Portrait attributed to Dmitry Levitzky.

Due to her noble birth and wealth, Catherine became in the most desirable bride of the Imperial court. Empress Catherine II arranged her marriage with Prince Ivan Sergeevich Baryatinsky, the Russian ambassador in France. The wedding took place on 8 January 1767 in the city of Reval. One of his contemporaries wrote that the groom is:

...the happiest person, but on the other hand he should not be envious, knowing his good qualities.

On the occasion of his wedding, Prince Baryatinsky received 4,000 serfs and villages in the Kursk province: Ivanovskoe, Snagost and others in the Rylsky District, which Emperor Peter I gave to Hetman Ivan Mazepa before his betrayal. The Empress gave him in addition 100,000 acres of land and about 35,000 serfs as a gratitude because Prince Baryatinsky saved her from Vorontsov's intrigues.

Catherine bore her husband two children: a son, Prince Ivan Ivanovich Baryatinsky (born on 17 October 1767; in turn father of the Russian field marshal Aleksandr Baryatinsky) and a daughter, Princess Anna Ivanovna Baryatinskaya (born on 5 December 1772; by marriage Countess Tolstaya).

Having married, Catherine shone in the Saint Petersburg court, where she was considered one of the first beauties. She had a tremendous success and many love affairs; The Grand Duke Pavel Petrovich was in love with her, and her affair with Count Andrei Kirillovich Razumovsky eventually led to the end of her marriage. However, Prince Baryatinsky himself wasn't a faithful spouse, at the same time he had a relationship with the wife of the Imperial Chamberlain, the beautiful Countess Anastasia Nikolaevna Neledinskaya. According to Prince Pyotr Vladimirovich Dolgorukov:

Ekaterina Petrovna was a very extraordinary and proud woman; she continually made her husband feel that she had done him the greatest honor by marrying him; she could not stand being called a princess and titled her lordship, but demanded that she be called a princess and titled lordship.

In 1774, Catherine accompanied her husband to Paris, where he was appointed envoy, and was present at the coronation of King Louis XVI. According to court gossip, Princess Baryatinskaya went to Paris pregnant from Count Razumovsky's child, where she gave birth, covering up her adventure with a seizure of "water illness". Having learned the whole truth from one of the maids, Prince Baryatinsky put the question bluntly. The tears of his wife made him forget her slip, but new affairs began in Poland, which again made the spouses to quarrel.

=== Princess Baryatinskaya ===
Catherine returned to Saint Petersburg alone, where she made a splash with the Parisian fashions and outfits she brought. But the Empress didn't approve of all her fashions and found them funny, and therefore both the court and the whole city began to criticize them. French diplomat Baron Daniel de Corberon, having met Princess Baryatinskaya in 1776, wrote in his diary:

Outwardly, I liked her: extremely graceful, with an amazing waist, expressive features, dignified and relaxed in movements, but at the same time a little mannered. She is very kind and knows how to carry on a conversation, expressing herself easily and beautifully. I find that she is, in tone, similar to the Parisian ladies; a touch of philosophy mixed with feeling makes these ladies very dangerous. The Princess quite possesses this kind of coquetry.

Officially separated from her husband but retaining her title, the frivolous beauty didn't receive invitations to the small court of Grand Duke Pavel Petrovich, which upset her very much. Sometimes her tone in society was indecent; once, speaking of Count Wilhelm von Nesselrode and his prolonged visit, she added: "He will marry me". Soon, having quarreled with almost the entire Saint Petersburg society, Princess Baryatinskaya, along with her friend, Catherine Alexandrovna Menshikova —the wife of Stepan Stepanovich Zinoviev, Russian envoy in Spain and like her, also separated from her husband—, decided to found her own small society of friends. But in the light of their gatherings, many laughed, calling them "love club" or "academy". In September 1774, Princess Baryatinskaya's father Peter August assumed the headship of the Beck line of the House of Schleswig-Holstein-Sonderburg after the death of his brother Duke Charles Louis without surviving male issue; however, he died five months later, on 24 February 1775.

In 1783 Princess Baryatinskaya bought a mansion from Prince Nikolay Yusupov at 22 Millionnaya Street. She occupied a very high position in the society, where, although many disliked and condemned her, she was surrounded by admirers. It was considered a great honor to get into her house; besides, she lived magnificently, and the whole city spoke about her receptions and theatrical performances. Later, in his essay on Princess Baryatinskaya, Prince Ivan Mikhailovich Dolgorukov wrote:

Her wealth, name, and even her more gentle character and amiable qualities of her heart attracted the entire selected city to her. She lived luxuriously and pleasantly together, with everyone she was polite, supportive and approximately hospitable; being always at odds with her husband, she wanted to fill the theatrical society of her children with well-bred young people, among whom I was honored to be.

In 1786, Prince Baryatinsky finally returned from Paris and settled in Saint Petersburg with his brother, Chief Marshal Fyodor Sergeevich Baryatinsky. In 1789, Catherine sold her mansion on Millionnaya Street to Elizabeth Divov and went abroad. The purpose of the trip was treatment for an illness in Aix-la-Chapelle; she was accompanied by the Empress's physician Adam Weikart, her son Ivan (whom she intended to enroll in one of the German universities), and the young Countess Amalie Louise of Sayn-Wittgenstein-Ludwigsburg. In part of the route, Catherine was accompanied by her daughter Countess Anna Tolstaya.

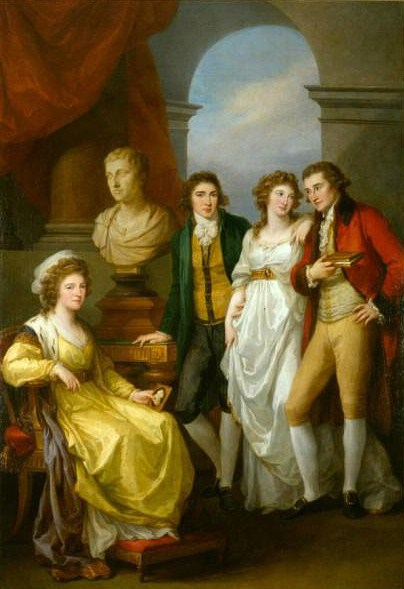
Portrait of the Baryatinsky family, by Angelica Kauffman, 1791.

They traveled very unhurriedly, traveled for a long time in Holland, Austria and Germany. In gratitude for the cure, Princess Baryatinskaya ordered a bust of physician Weikart from the French sculpture Étienne Maurice Falconet. In Vienna, Weikart treated Count Ivan Chernyshyov. In December 1790, avoiding Revolutionary France, Princess Baryatinskaya arrived in Rome, where in January 1791 she met German painter Angelica Kauffman. In her travel journal, she wrote:

Before leaving Rome, I once again went to see Angelica Kaufman and admire her work. I've seen them several times already, but I never get bored looking at them. This woman, despite her high talent, is full of modesty. She has a gentle character, which makes her loved and respected by everyone.

Visiting her studio many times, she commissioned the artist to have a large portrait of herself surrounded by family members with life-size figures. In this famous painting, Princess Baryatinskaya is depicted sitting in an armchair at the table on which there is a marble bust of her father work of the German sculptor Alexander Trippel. In her hands she holds a medallion with a portrait of her husband, her children and son-in-law are standing nearby.

=== Later years ===
Catherine spent the last years of her life in Berlin, where she acquired a mansion on Pariser Platz in front of the Brandenburg Gate. In 1800 she bought the suburban Friedrichsfelde Palace from the printer and publisher Georg Jacob Decker the Younger. In Friedrichsfelde, she led a lavish life, with close ties to the Prussian royal family. Among the guests Catherine received at her palace were King Frederick William III and Queen Louise of Prussia, and Emperor Alexander I of Russia. Subsequent visits were less welcome by Catherine: in October 1806, Friedrichsfelde was briefly the headquarters of the French troops led by Marshal Davout, where Napoleon paraded his troops.

Having reverted to her maiden name of Princess of Schleswig-Holstein-Sonderburg-Beck with permission from the Prussian king, Catherine died at Friedrichsfelde on 28 November 1811.

== Sources ==
- Fontane, Theodor (1882). "An der Spree, Friedrichsfelde von 1800 bis 1810". Wanderungen durch die Mark Brandenburg (in German). Vol. 4. Berlin: Spreeland.
- Karnovich, E.P. (1874). The remarkable wealth of individuals in Russia.
- Kurakin, F A. (1894). Prince F. Kurakin. Archive from the family archives of famous Russian. Diplomats and large landowners. Vol. 5. Saratov: Book on demand. ISBN 5-519-44379-3. OCLC 1302177080.
