= Eugen of Württemberg =

Duke Eugen of Württemberg may refer to:

- Duke Eugen of Württemberg (1758–1822), third son of Frederick II Eugene, Duke of Württemberg
- Duke Eugen of Württemberg (1788–1857), eldest son of the above
- Duke Eugen of Württemberg (1820–1875), second child and first son of the above
- Duke Eugen of Württemberg (1846–1877), second child and only son of the above
