= Sayn-Wittgenstein-Ludwigsburg =

Cadet branch of the House of Sayn-Wittgenstein-Berleburg

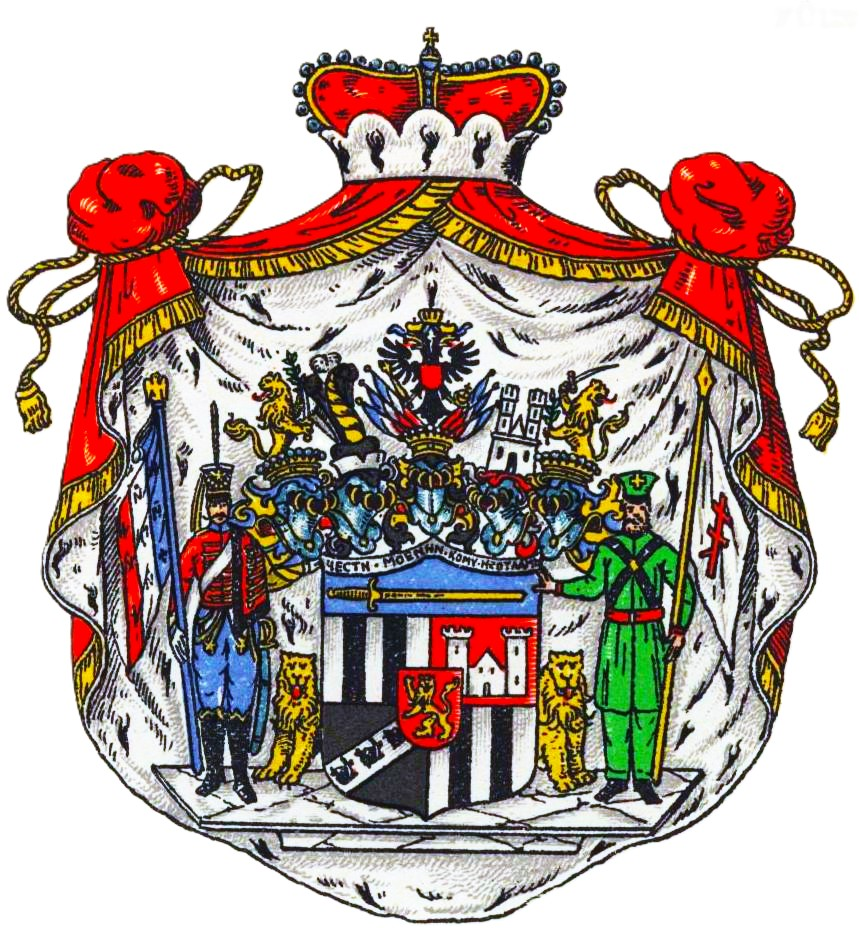
Coat of arms of the Sayn-Wittgenstein-Ludwigsburg family

Sayn-Wittgenstein-Berleburg-Ludwigsburg, better known as Sayn-Wittgenstein-Ludwigsburg, was a cadet branch of the House of Sayn-Wittgenstein-Berleburg.

== History ==
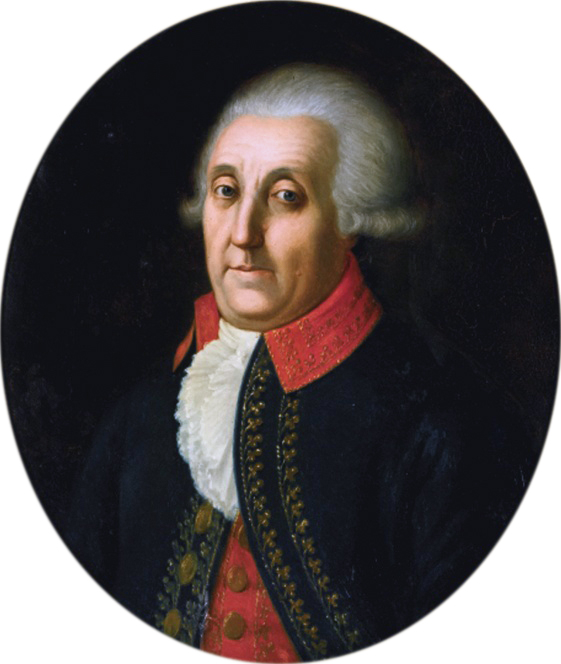
Christian Louis Casimir, 2nd Count of Sayn-Wittgenstein-Ludwigsburg

It was created in 1694 by Graf Casimir zu Sayn-Wittgenstein-Berleburg (1687–1741, ruled 1694–1741) for his youngest brother, Count Ludwig Franz (1694–1750). Its seat was Ludwigsburg, a spectacular two-winged manor house in Berleburg built by the master builder Mannus Riedesel.

The branch had no territorial holdings of its own and as such had no Imperial immediacy in the Holy Roman Empire. Later generations flourished as officers for the Czar of Russia. The family was raised to the rank of Prince in 1834 by King Frederick William III of Prussia.

After their return to Germany in the first half of the 19th century, this line of the family came in to possession of Sayn Castle and Sayn Palace in Bendorf and due to that they officially became Princes of Sayn-Wittgenstein-Sayn in 1861.

With the revolutions and wars of the 20th century, descendants were dispersed throughout Europe and North America.

== Counts and Princes of Sayn-Wittgenstein-Ludwigsburg ==
- Ludwig Franz (1700–1750)
  - Christian Louis Casimir (1750–1797)
    - Ludwig Adolf Peter (1797–1843), raised to the rank of Fürst of Sayn-Wittgenstein-Sayn in 1834 by King Frederick William III of Prussia
