= Prince Johann of Schleswig-Holstein-Sonderburg-Glücksburg =

Danish prince (1825–1911)

Prince Johann
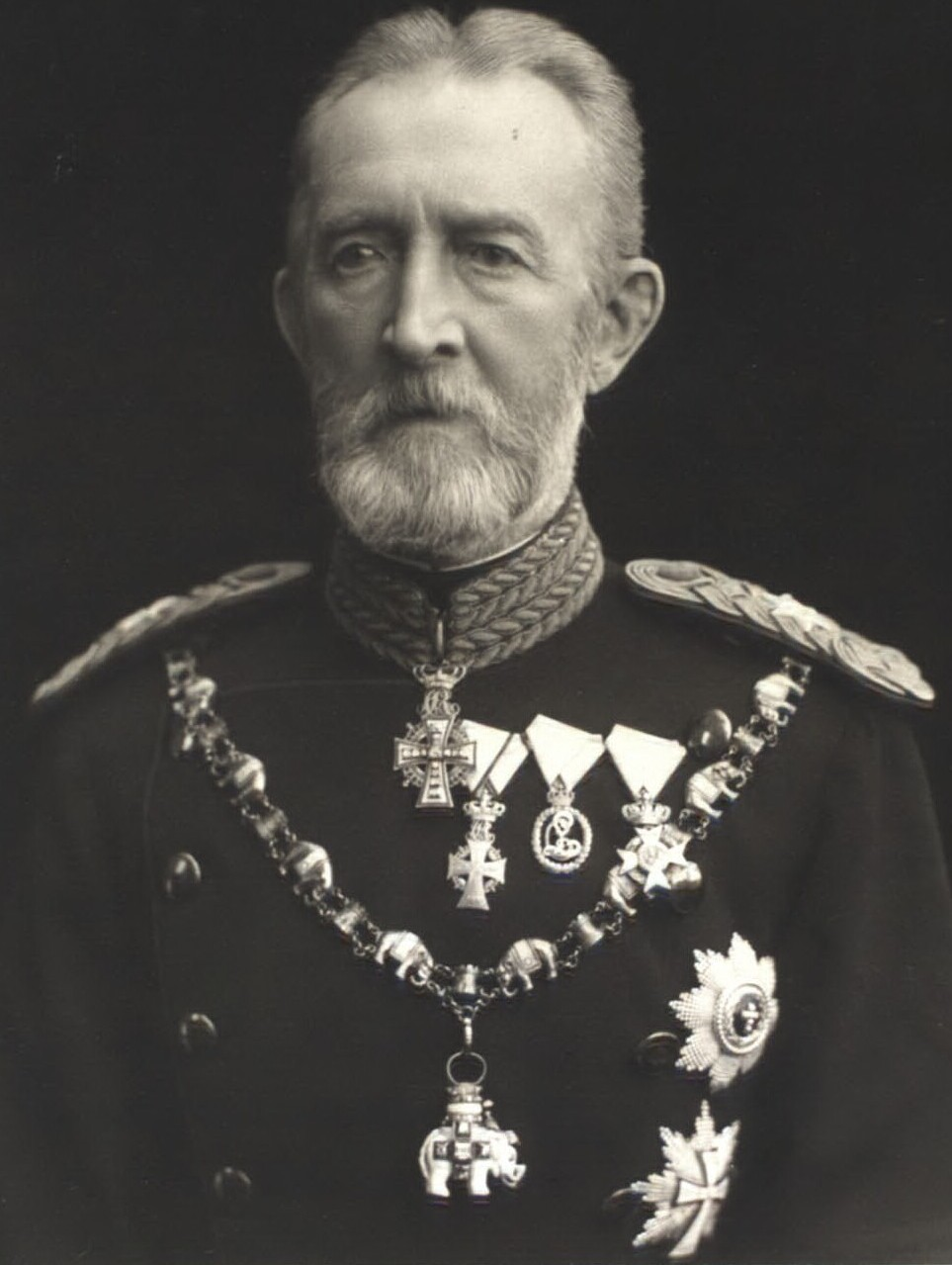
- Prince Johann c. 1890–1907
- Born: 5 December 1825; Gottorp, Schleswig
- Died: 27 May 1911 (aged 85); Yellow Mansion, Copenhagen, Denmark
- House: Glücksburg
- Father: Friedrich Wilhelm, Duke of Schleswig-Holstein-Sonderburg-Glücksburg
- Mother: Princess Louise Caroline of Hesse-Kassel

Prince Johann of Schleswig-Holstein-Sonderburg-Glücksburg (5 December 1825 – 27 May 1911) was the ninth of the ten children of Friedrich Wilhelm, Duke of Schleswig-Holstein-Sonderburg-Glücksburg and Princess Louise Caroline of Hesse-Kassel. He was named after his ancestor John II, Duke of Schleswig-Holstein-Sonderburg.

== Biography ==
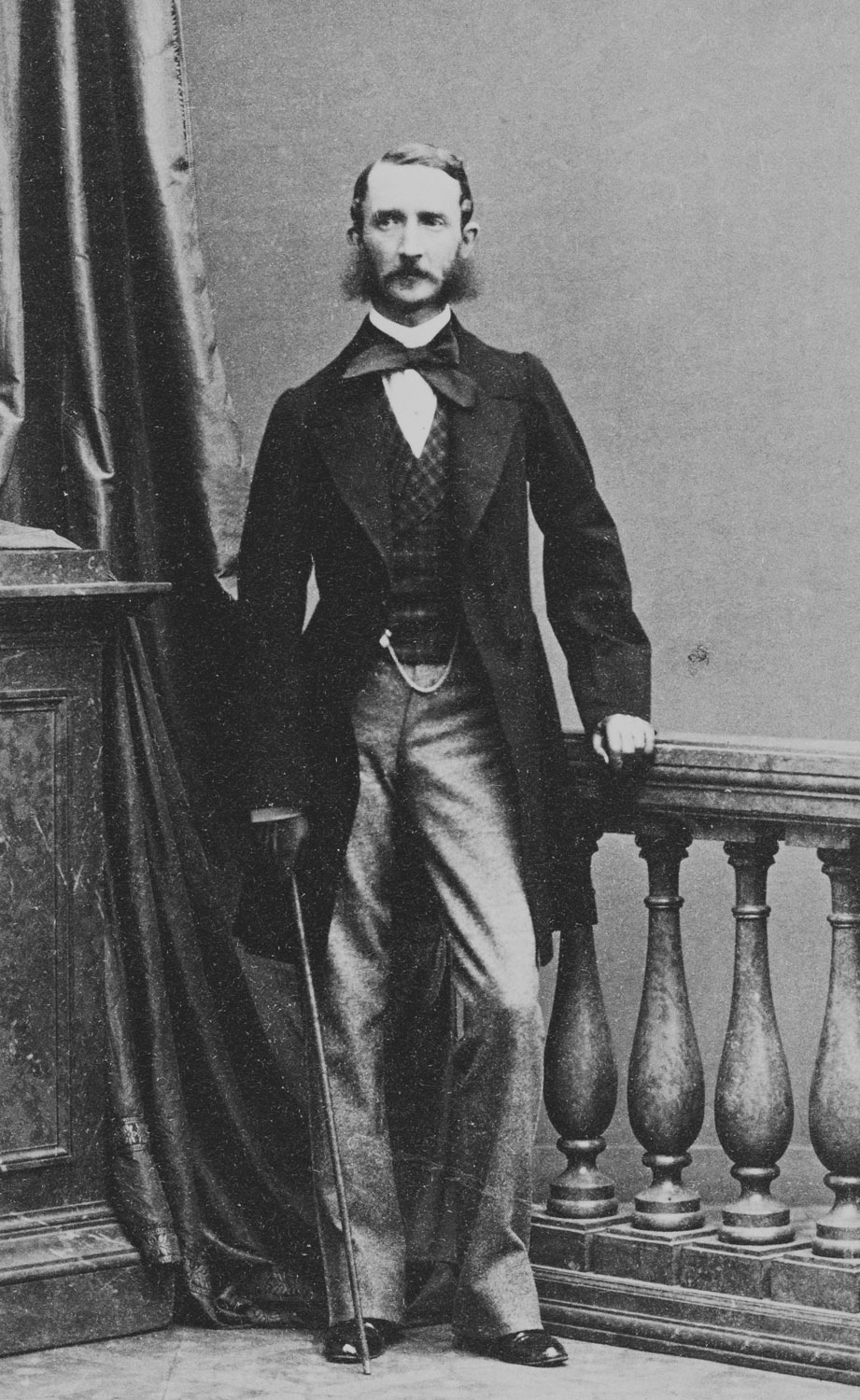
Prince Johann in 1862 (Royal Collection).

As per the wishes of his cousin King Christian VIII, Prince Johann first enlisted in the Prussian military in 1842 and upon his graduation was appointed second lieutenant of the 27th Prussian Infantry Regiment in Magdeburg. He studied at the University of Bonn before joining the Dragoon Guards Regiments in Berlin. He participated in the German revolutions of 1848–1849 and the First Schleswig War against Denmark; this conflict of loyalties between Prussia and Denmark prompted him to request exemption from service. He went on to serve in various departments and was promoted to Rittmeister in 1854. The following year he was appointed Major à la suite and went to Denmark, settling down in Copenhagen.

When the Second Schleswig War broke out in 1864, Johann resigned from the Prussian army, and on 29 February his brother — now King Christian IX of Denmark — appointed him Lieutenant Colonel à la suite in the Danish Army. He went on to represent Denmark on diplomatic visits abroad, and was present in London during the baptism of the Prince of Wales' son, Johann's great-nephew, the future King George V of the United Kingdom. He was promoted to colonel in 1865, and further to major-general in 1867.

From March to November 1867 he served as regent for his nephew, King George I of Greece during the Cretan uprising, when the latter was away on a tour of Europe in search of a bride; he soon grew popular among the people.

Johann died unmarried in 1911, outliving the rest of his siblings. He was interred at Roskilde Cathedral.

== Honours ==
- Denmark:
  - Knight of the Elephant, 9 March 1864
  - Cross of Honour of the Order of the Dannebrog, 9 March 1864
  - Commemorative Medal for the Golden Wedding of King Christian IX and Queen Louise, 1892
  - Grand Cross of the Dannebrog, 12 February 1894
- Ascanian duchies: Grand Cross of the Order of Albert the Bear, 23 October 1850
- Kingdom of Greece: Grand Cross of the Redeemer
- (Duchy of Nassau) Nassau Ducal Family: Knight of the Gold Lion of Nassau
- Mecklenburg: Grand Cross of the Wendish Crown, with Crown in Ore
- Kingdom of Portugal: Grand Cross of the Tower and Sword
- Sweden-Norway:
  - Knight of the Seraphim, 27 July 1869
  - Knight of the Order of Charles XIII, 21 January 1877
  - Grand Cross of St. Olav, with Collar, 12 February 1879
- Kingdom of Prussia:
  - Knight of the Black Eagle, 3 November 1892
  - Grand Cross of the Red Eagle
- Russian Empire:
  - Knight of St. Andrew, 1885
  - Knight of St. Alexander Nevsky
  - Knight of the White Eagle
  - Knight of St. Anna, 1st Class
  - Knight of St. Stanislaus, 1st Class
- United Kingdom: Honorary Grand Cross of the Royal Victorian Order, 11 October 1901
- (Saxe-Coburg and Gotha) (Duchy of Saxe-Altenburg) (Saxe-Meiningen) Ernestine duchies: Grand Cross of the Saxe-Ernestine House Order
- France: Grand Cross of the Legion of Honour
- Oldenburg: Grand Cross of the Order of Duke Peter Friedrich Ludwig, with Golden Crown

== Ancestry ==
Ancestors of Prince Johann of Schleswig-Holstein-Sonderburg-Glücksburg

8. Prince Karl Anton August of Schleswig-Holstein-Sonderburg-Beck
4. Frederick Charles Louis, Duke of Schleswig-Holstein-Sonderburg-Beck
9. Countess Charlotte of Dohna-Leistenau
2. Frederick William, Duke of Schleswig-Holstein-Sonderburg-Glücksburg
10. Count Karl Leopold von Schlieben
5. Countess Friederike von Schlieben
11. Countess Marie Eleonore von Lehndorff
1. Prince Johann of Schleswig-Holstein-Sonderburg-Glücksburg
12. Frederick II, Landgrave of Hesse-Kassel
6. Prince Charles of Hesse-Kassel
13. Princess Mary of Great Britain
3. Princess Louise Caroline of Hesse-Kassel
14. Frederick V of Denmark
7. Princess Louise of Denmark
15. Princess Louisa of Great Britain
