= Prince Julius of Schleswig-Holstein-Sonderburg-Glücksburg =

Danish prince

Prince Julius
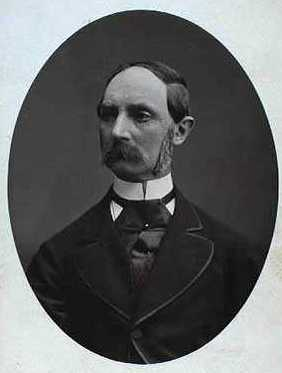
- Born: 14 October 1824; Gottorp, Schleswig, Schleswig
- Died: 1 June 1903 (aged 78); Itzehoe, Schleswig-Holstein, Prussia, Germany
- Spouse: Elisabeth von Ziegesar (m. 1883; died 1887)
- House: Glücksburg
- Father: Friedrich Wilhelm, Duke of Schleswig-Holstein-Sonderburg-Glücksburg
- Mother: Princess Louise Caroline of Hesse-Kassel

Prince Julius of Schleswig-Holstein-Sonderburg-Glücksburg (14 October 1824, Gottorp, Schleswig, Schleswig– 1 June 1903, Itzehoe, Schleswig-Holstein, Prussia, Germany) was the eighth of the ten children of Friedrich Wilhelm, Duke of Schleswig-Holstein-Sonderburg-Glücksburg and Princess Louise Caroline of Hesse-Kassel.

== Biography ==
In 1863, Prince Julius was sent to Greece with his young nephew, Prince Vilhelm of Denmark, who had recently ascended to the throne of Greece as King of the Hellenes, as an advisor. Eighteen months later, the King returned from a walk to discover that, whilst he was out, Julius had invited seven ministers associated with the former, and deeply unpopular, King Otto to the Palace to discuss the removal of Count Sponneck, another of the King's advisors. Indignant at what he saw as an attempt at a palace putsch, the King ordered Julius to leave Greece within one week.

Julius contracted a morganatic marriage with Elisabeth von Ziegesar (1856–1887), daughter of Wolf von Ziegesar, at Ballenstedt Castle on 2 July 1883. After their marriage, she was styled Countess von Roest.

== Honours ==
- Denmark:
  - Knight of the Elephant, 13 October 1864
  - Cross of Honour of the Order of the Dannebrog, 13 October 1864
  - Commemorative Medal for the Golden Wedding of King Christian IX and Queen Louise, 1892
- Ascanian duchies: Grand Cross of Albert the Bear, 4 October 1853
- Brunswick: Grand Cross of Henry the Lion, 1847
- (Saxe-Coburg and Gotha) (Duchy of Saxe-Altenburg) (Saxe-Meiningen) Ernestine duchies: Grand Cross of the Saxe-Ernestine House Order, May 1867
- Kingdom of Prussia: Knight of the Red Eagle, 1st Class, 10 March 1881

== Ancestry ==
Ancestors of Prince Julius of Schleswig-Holstein-Sonderburg-Glücksburg

8. Prince Karl Anton August of Schleswig-Holstein-Sonderburg-Beck
4. Frederick Charles Louis, Duke of Schleswig-Holstein-Sonderburg-Beck
9. Countess Charlotte of Dohna-Leistenau
2. Frederick William, Duke of Schleswig-Holstein-Sonderburg-Glücksburg
10. Count Karl Leopold von Schlieben
5. Countess Friederike von Schlieben
11. Countess Marie Eleonore von Lehndorff
1. Prince Julius of Schleswig-Holstein-Sonderburg-Glücksburg
12. Frederick II, Landgrave of Hesse-Kassel
6. Prince Charles of Hesse-Kassel
13. Princess Mary of Great Britain
3. Princess Louise Caroline of Hesse-Kassel
14. Frederick V of Denmark
7. Princess Louise of Denmark
15. Princess Louisa of Great Britain
