= Szymbark =

Szymbark may refer to the following places:

- Szymbark, Lesser Poland Voivodeship (south Poland)
- Szymbark, Pomeranian Voivodeship (north Poland)
- Szymbark, Warmian-Masurian Voivodeship (north Poland)
