= Oppeln =

Oppeln or Opole may refer to:

== Places ==
- Opole, a city now in southern Poland
- Opole Voivodeship, a voivodeship in Poland
- Duchy of Opole, or Herzogtum Oppeln, duchy of Silesia ruled by the Piast dynasty
- Oppeln (region), a region of the Prussian Province of Silesia
- Oppidum Lubaw, an older name for Löbau, a city in Saxony, Germany

== People ==
- Władysław Opolczyk (1332–1401), or Wladyslaw of Opole, Duke of Opole
- Oppeln-Bronikowski, a noble Lusatian family, including:
  - Friedrich von Oppeln-Bronikowski (1873–1936), a German writer, translator, biographer, publisher and cultural historian
  - Hermann von Oppeln-Bronikowski (1899–1966), a German army officer and Panzer ace
