= Princess Luise of Schleswig-Holstein-Sonderburg-Beck =

German princess

Luise
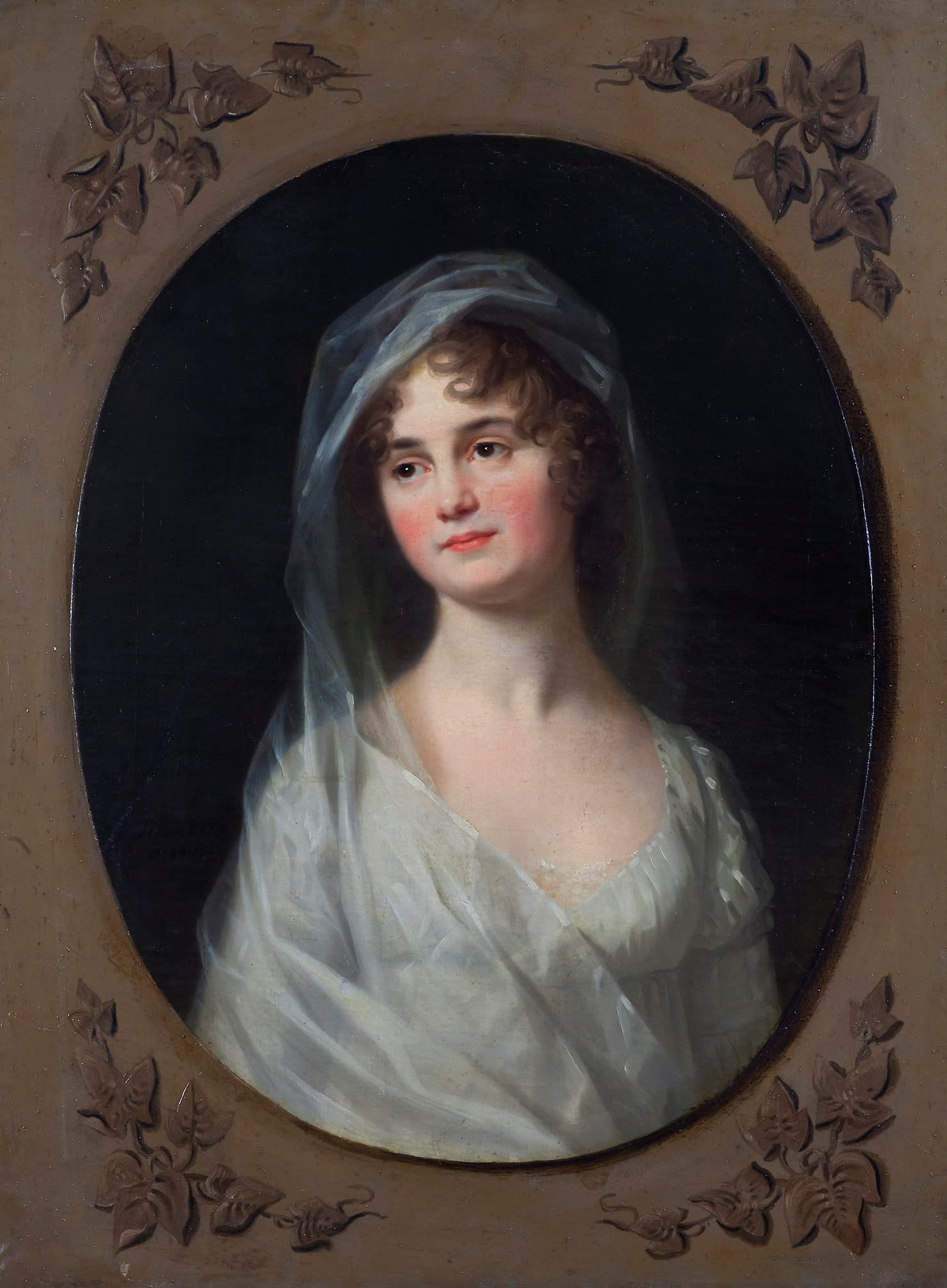
- 1804 portrait

Princess consort of Anhalt-Pless
- Born: 28 September 1783; Lindenau manor, Prussia
- Died: 24 November 1803 (aged 20); Schloss Pless, Pless, Silesia
- Spouse: Frederick Ferdinand, Prince of Anhalt-Pless (m. 1803)
Names
- Maria Dorothea Henriette Luise
- House: Schleswig-Holstein-Sonderburg-Beck (by birth); Ascania (by marriage)
- Father: Friedrich Karl Ludwig, Duke of Schleswig-Holstein-Sonderburg-Beck
- Mother: Countess Friederike of Schlieben

Luise, Princess of Anhalt-Pless (née Princess Maria Dorothea Henriette Luise of Schleswig-Holstein-Sonderburg-Beck; 28 September 1783 – 24 November 1803) was a member of the Danish royal family and, as the first wife of Frederick Ferdinand, Prince of Anhalt-Pless, the princess consort of Anhalt-Pless.

== Biography ==
Princess Maria Dorothea Henriette Luise of Schleswig-Holstein-Sonderburg-Beck was born in Lindenau on 28 September 1783 to Friedrich Karl Ludwig, Duke of Schleswig-Holstein-Sonderburg-Beck and Countess Friederike of Schlieben. Her mother was the daughter of Count Karl Leopold von Schlieben, who served as Minister of war in Prussia. As a male-line descendant of Christian III of Denmark, she was a princess of Denmark.

On 20 August 1803 she married Frederick Ferdinand, Prince of Anhalt-Pless in Lindenau, becoming the princess consort of Anhalt-Pless. She died three months later, on 24 November 1803, at Schloss Pless. A posthumous portrait of her was painted by Johann Friedrich August Tischbein in Leipzig in 1804.

Her husband later married Countess Julie of Brandenburg and became the Duke of Anhalt-Köthen.
