= Countess Friederike von Schlieben =

- Duchess of Schleswig-Holstein-Sonderburg-Beck
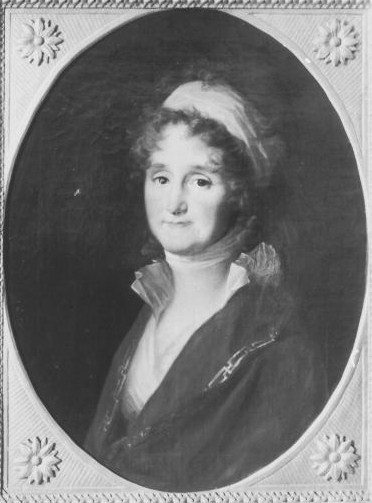
- 1800 portrait
- Born: 28 February 1757; Königsberg, Kingdom of Prussia
- Died: 17 December 1827 (aged 70); Schleswig, Duchy of Schleswig
- Spouse: Friedrich Karl Ludwig, Duke of Schleswig-Holstein-Sonderburg-Beck (m. 1780; died 1816)
- Issue: Princess Friederike; Princess Luise; Friedrich Wilhelm
Names
- German: Friederike Amalie Antonie
- House: Schlieben
- Father: Count Karl Leopold of Schlieben
- Mother: Countess Marie Eleanore von Lehndorff

Countess Friederike Amalie of Schlieben (German: Friederike Amalie Antonie Gräfin von Schlieben; 28 February 1757 – 17 December 1827) was the consort of Friedrich Karl Ludwig, Duke of Schleswig-Holstein-Sonderburg-Beck.

== Early life ==
Born in Königsberg, Kingdom of Prussia, into the Schlieben family, part of an old German nobility, Friederike was the second and youngest daughter of Count Karl Leopold of Schlieben, who served as Prussian Minister of War, and his wife, Countess Marie Eleonore von Lehndorff.

== Marriage and issue ==
Friederike married Friedrich Karl Ludwig, Duke of Schleswig-Holstein-Sonderburg-Beck, an only son of Prince Karl Anton August of Schleswig-Holstein-Sonderburg-Beck and his wife, Countess Charlotte of Dohna-Schlodien, on 9 March 1780 in Königsberg.

At the time, the marriage was not looked upon favorably by the House of Schleswig-Holstein, because the Schlieben family, although an ancient one, did not have a high enough rank, in particular did not belong to an exclusive circle of either European royal families or families with Imperial immediacy, which would be more acceptable.

Friedrich and Friederike had three children:

- Princess Friederike of Schleswig-Holstein-Sonderburg-Beck (13 December 1780 – 19 January 1862) ⚭ 1800 Baron Gottlob Samuel von Richthofen (1769–1808)
- Princess Luise of Schleswig-Holstein-Sonderburg-Beck (28 September 1783 – 24 November 1803) ⚭ 1803 Frederick Ferdinand, Duke of Anhalt-Köthen
- Friedrich Wilhelm, Duke of Schleswig-Holstein-Sonderburg-Glücksburg (4 January 1785 – 27 February 1831)

Her husband, Duke Friedrich, was succeeded as Duke by his only son, Friedrich Wilhelm, Duke of Schleswig-Holstein-Sonderburg-Glücksburg.

== Death ==
Friederike died on 17 December 1827 in Schleswig, Duchy of Schleswig, aged 70. Her body was buried alongside her husband in the Chapel of Sonderburg.

== Ancestry ==
Ancestors of Countess Friederike von Schlieben

8. Georg Adam II, Count von Schlieben
4. Georg Adam III, Count von Schlieben
9. Baroness Eleonore Christine von Oelsen
2. Count Karl Leopold von Schlieben
10. Count Albrecht Christoph Finck von Finckenstein
5. Countess Katharina Dorothea Finck von Finckenstein
11. Baroness Arnolda Charlotte von Creytzen
1. Countess Friederike of Schlieben
12. Count Gerhard Ahasverus von Lehndorff
6. Count Ahasverus Ernst von Lehndorff
13. Countess Maria Eleonore von Dönhoff
3. Countess Maria Eleonore von Lehndorff
14. Heinrich von Wallenrodt
7. Baroness Maria Luise von Wallenrodt
15. Maria Katharina von Podewils

Countess Friederike von Schlieben House of Schlieben Born: 28 February 1757 Died: 17 December 1827
German royalty
Preceded by Ursula Anna of Dohna-Schlobitten	Duchess of Schleswig-Holstein-Sonderburg-Beck; 9 March 1780 – 25 March 1816	Succeeded by Princess Louise Caroline of Hesse-Kassel
