= Bronikowski =

Bronikowski is a Polish surname:

- Friedrich von Oppeln-Bronikowski (1873–1936), a German writer, translator, publisher and cultural historian
- Hermann (Leopold August) von Oppeln-Bronikowski (1899–1966), a German military commander
- Franciszek (Jan) Bronikowski (1907–1964), a Polish rower

== See also ==
- Von Oppeln-Bronikowski
