= Countess Katharina Dorothea Finck von Finckenstein =

Prussian countess (1700–1728)

Countess Katharina Finck von Finckenstein
- Born: 6 or 7 June 1700; Schönberg, Duchy of Prussia
- Died: 26 June 1728 (aged 28); Halberstadt, Kingdom of Prussia
- Spouse: Count Georg Adam III von Schlieben
- Issue: Countess Marie Charlotte Luise von Schlieben; Count Karl Leopold von Schlieben; Count Georg Adam IV von Schlieben
Names
- German: Katharina Dorothea Elisabeth Gräfin Finck von Finckenstein
- Father: Count Albrecht Christoph Finck von Finckenstein
- Mother: Arnolda Charlotte von Creytzen

Countess Katharina Dorothea Elisabeth Finck von Finckenstein (German: Katharina Dorothea Elisabeth Gräfin Finck von Finckenstein; 6/7 June 1700 – 26 June 1728) was a member of the German noble family Finck von Finckenstein.

== Early life ==
She was born in Schönberg, East Prussia, and was the daughter of Albrecht Christoph Count Finck von Finckenstein (1661–1730) and Arnolda Charlotte von Creytzen (1673–1749).

== Marriage and issue ==
She married Count Georg Adam III von Schlieben (1688–1737) in Schönberg on 27 November 1720. They had three children:

1. Countess Marie Charlotte Luise von Schlieben (1721–1803). She married Count Friedrich Konrad Finck von Finckenstein and had issue.
2. Count Karl Leopold von Schlieben (1723–1788). One of his daughters, Countess Friederike of Schlieben, was married to Friedrich Karl Ludwig, Duke of Schleswig-Holstein-Sonderburg-Beck, a member of the Danish royal family. Through them, Katharina is an ancestor of many of the royal houses of Europe.
3. Count Georg Adam IV von Schlieben (1728–1795). He married Katharina Elisabeth von der Marwitz and had issue.
