= Opole (disambiguation) =

Opole is a city in southern Poland.

Opole may also refer to:

- Opole Lubelskie, a town in eastern Poland
- Opole, Łódź Voivodeship (central Poland)
- Opole, Lublin Voivodeship (east Poland)
- Opole, Masovian Voivodeship (east-central Poland)
- Opole (administrative), a generic term for a historical Polish unit of administrative division
- Oppilia, known as Opole in Polish, a geographic region of Lviv Oblast
- Opolye or Vladimir Opole, a historical region of Russia, a kernel of the medieval state of Vladimir-Suzdal
- Opole, Minnesota
- Opole (parliamentary constituency), a parliamentary constituency in Poland
- SS Opole

== See also ==
- }
- Oppeln (disambiguation)
