= Szymbark, Lesser Poland Voivodeship =

Szymbark
- Village
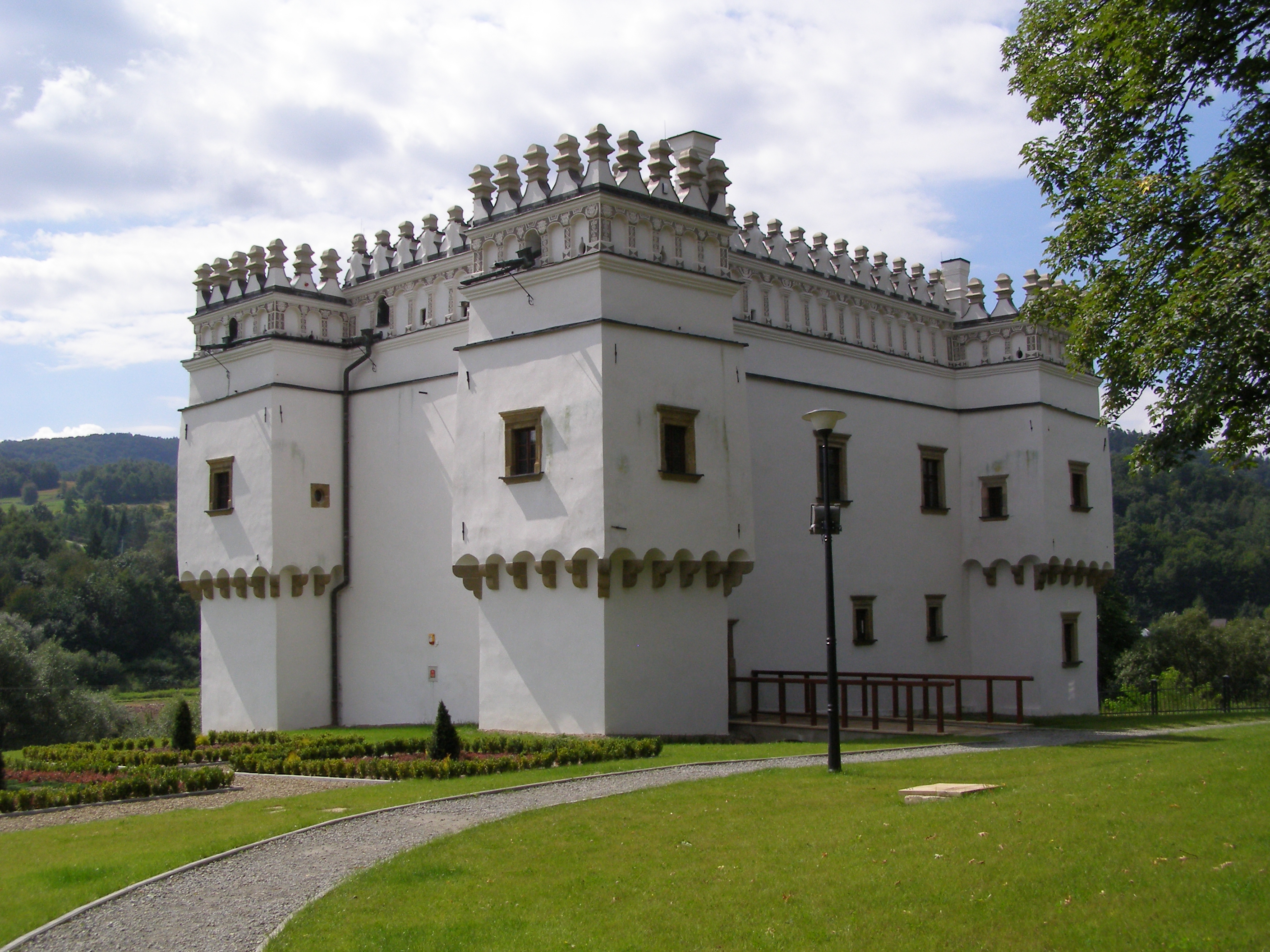
- Castle

- Location within Poland
- Coordinates: 49°37′9″N 21°5′49″E
- Country: Poland
- Voivodeship: Lesser Poland
- County: Gorlice
- Gmina: Gorlice

Population
  - Total: 3,067
- Website: http://www.szymbark.info

Szymbark (Polish pronunciation: [ˈʂɨmbark]) is a village in the administrative district of Gmina Gorlice, within Gorlice County, Lesser Poland Voivodeship, in southern Poland.

In Middle Ages the Szymbark Castle was residence of several knight families: Gładysz, Stroński, Siedlecki, Bronikowski, Rogoyski, Sękiewicz, and Kuźniarski.

== See also ==
- Walddeutsche
