= Princess Louise Caroline of Hesse-Kassel =

Princess of Hesse-Kassel

Princess Louise Caroline
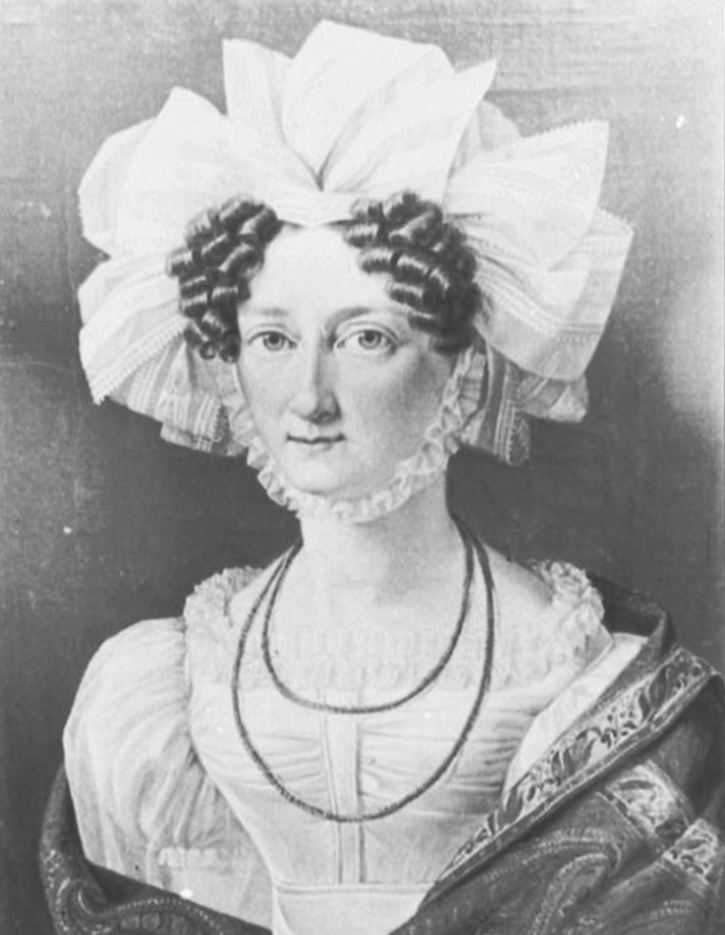
- Portrait, 1829

Duchess consort of Schleswig-Holstein-Sonderburg-Beck later Schleswig-Holstein-Sonderburg-Glücksburg
- Tenure: 25 March 1816 – 17 February 1831
- Born: 28 September 1789; Gottorp, Schleswig
- Died: 13 March 1867 (aged 77); Ballenstedt, Saxony
- Burial: Schleswig Cathedral
- Spouse: Friedrich Wilhelm, Duke of Schleswig-Holstein-Sonderburg-Glücksburg (m. 1810; died 1831)
- Issue: Princess Luise Marie; Friederike, Duchess of Anhalt-Bernburg; Karl, Duke of Schleswig-Holstein-Sonderburg-Glücksburg; Friedrich, Duke of Schleswig-Holstein-Sonderburg-Glücksburg; Prince Wilhelm; Christian IX of Denmark; Princess Luise; Prince Julius; Prince Johann; Prince Nikolaus
- House: Hesse-Kassel
- Father: Prince Charles of Hesse-Kassel
- Mother: Princess Louise of Denmark

Princess Louise Caroline of Hesse-Kassel (German: Luise Karoline von Hessen-Kassel; 28 September 1789 – 13 March 1867) was the consort of Friedrich Wilhelm, Duke of Schleswig-Holstein-Sonderburg-Glücksburg and the mother of King Christian IX of Denmark.

As the matriarch of the House of Glücksburg, her grandchildren included King Frederik VIII of Denmark, Queen Alexandra of the United Kingdom, Empress Marie Feodorovna of All the Russias, King George I of the Hellenes, and Crown Princess Thyra of Hanover.

== Early life ==
Louise Caroline was born on 28 September 1789 at Gottorp, in the Duchy of Schleswig, to Prince Charles of Hesse-Kassel and Princess Louise of Denmark. Much of her childhood was spend in Schleswig. Her elder sister Marie Sophie of Hesse-Kassel became Queen consort of Frederick VI of Denmark.

== Marriage and issue ==
Some time after 1805, Friedrich Wilhelm, the later Duke of Schleswig-Holstein-Sonderburg-Glücksburg, was stationed at the southern border of the Kingdom of Denmark as an officer. Louise Caroline met him while he was there and they were engaged on 27 November 1809. They were married on 26 January 1810 at Gottorp. Her husband inherited the title of duke in 1816, at which point she became the duchess consort. The couple had ten children:

- Princess Luise Marie Friederike of Schleswig-Holstein-Sonderburg-Glücksburg (23 October 1810 – 11 May 1869).
- Princess Friederike Karoline Juliane of Schleswig-Holstein-Sonderburg-Glücksburg (9 October 1811 – 10 July 1902).
- Karl, Duke of Schleswig-Holstein-Sonderburg-Glücksburg (30 September 1813 – 24 October 1878).
- Friedrich, Duke of Schleswig-Holstein-Sonderburg-Glücksburg (23 October 1814 – 27 November 1885).
- Prince Wilhelm of Schleswig-Holstein-Sonderburg-Glücksburg (10 April 1816 – 5 September 1893).
- Prince Christian of Schleswig-Holstein-Sonderburg-Beck (8 April 1818 – 29 January 1906); later Christian IX of Denmark.
- Princess Luise, Abbess of Itzehoe (18 November 1820 – 30 November 1894).
- Prince Julius of Schleswig-Holstein-Sonderburg-Glücksburg (14 October 1824 – 1 June 1903).
- Prince Johann of Schleswig-Holstein-Sonderburg-Glücksburg (5 December 1825 – 27 May 1911).
- Prince Nikolaus of Schleswig-Holstein-Sonderburg-Glücksburg (22 December 1828 – 18 August 1849).

Louise Caroline's son, Prince Christian, was named third-in-line to the throne of Christian VIII of Denmark in 1847. He succeeded his childless maternal second cousin, Frederick VII of Denmark, on 15 November 1863, the Hereditary Prince Ferdinand having died earlier.

== Later life ==
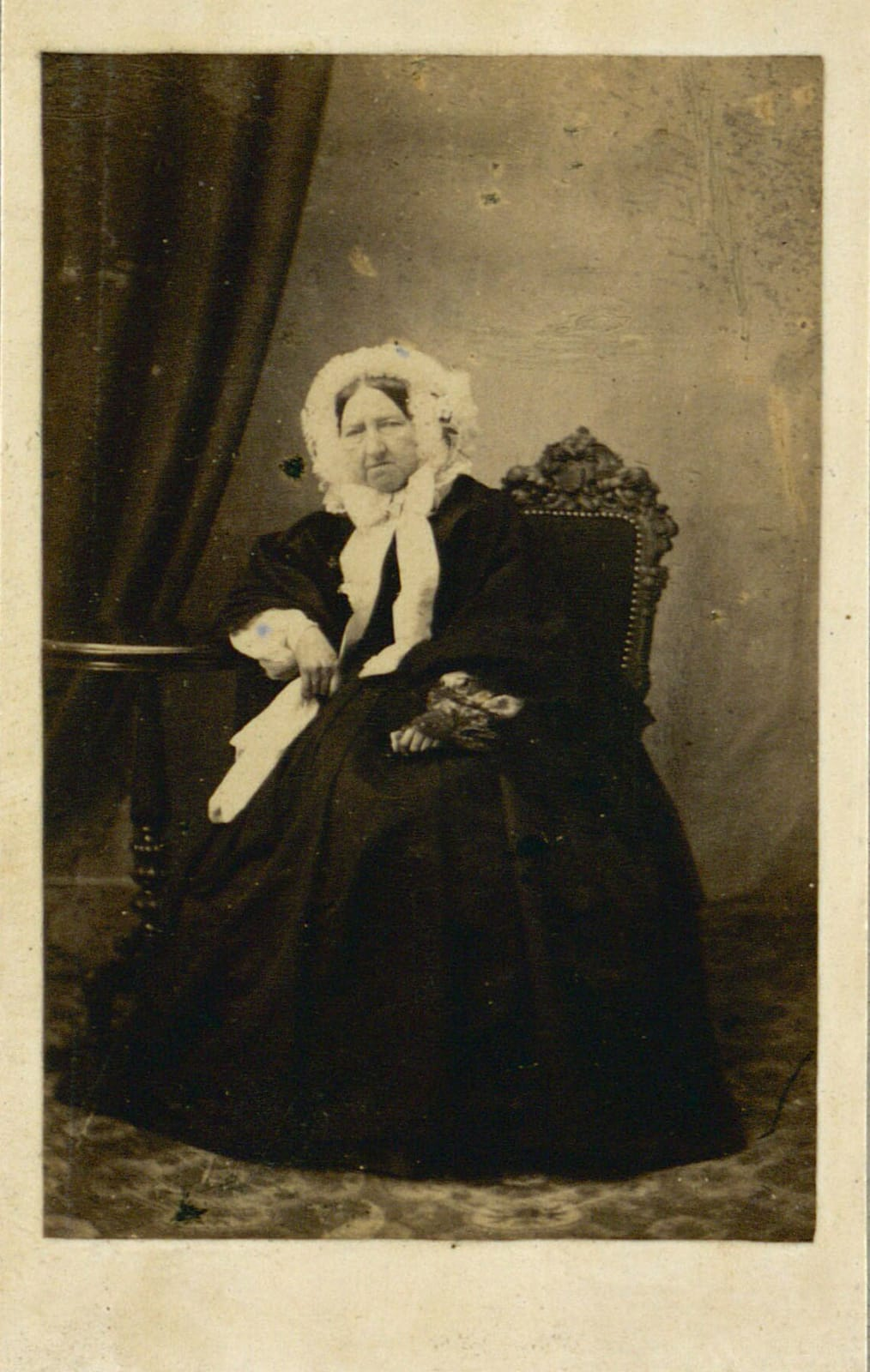
Rare photo of Louise Caroline

After her husband's death in 1831, she continued to stay at Louisenlund during the summers, but otherwise lived at Gottorp with her father until his death in 1836. She then spent winters at Glucksborg until 1848 when she moved to live with her daughter, Friederike Karoline Juliane, in Ballenstedt.

In early 1867, she fell ill, though few thought it cause for concern. She died in Ballenstedt on 13 March 1867. Her body lay in repose in the chapel of Ballenstedt Castle on 18 March, after which her coffin was carried by her six living sons. She was then buried at Schleswig Cathedral beside her husband. At the time of her death, she was the last surviving grandchild of Frederick V of Denmark.

Princess Louise Caroline of Hesse-Kassel House of Hesse-Kassel Cadet branch of the House of Hesse Born: 28 September 1789 Died: 13 March 1867
German nobility
Preceded by Friederike of Schlieben	Duchess consort of Schleswig-Holstein-Sonderburg-Beck; 25 March 1816–6 July 1825	Succeeded by Title changed
Preceded by Title changed	Duchess consort of Schleswig-Holstein-Sonderburg-Glücksburg; 6 July 1825–17 February 1831	Succeeded by Vilhelmine Marie of Denmark
