= Finck von Finckenstein =

Prussian noble family

- Battle cry: Sub Utraque Duce
- Alternative names: Interpretation: Under one leadership (represented by the star) should the family always stay together in good times and in bad times (represented by the rising and setting half moons)
- Earliest mention: in the Levant long before the Third Crusade in 1189; as a trophy brought to Germany
- Towns: Acre in the Levant, Deutsch-Eylau and Finckenstein in East Prussia
- Families: Finck von Finckenstein

The House of Finck von Finckenstein is a noble family classified as Uradel (German for 'ancient nobility'). It is one of the oldest Prussian aristocratic families extant, dating back to the 12th century in the Duchy of Carinthia.

== Origins ==
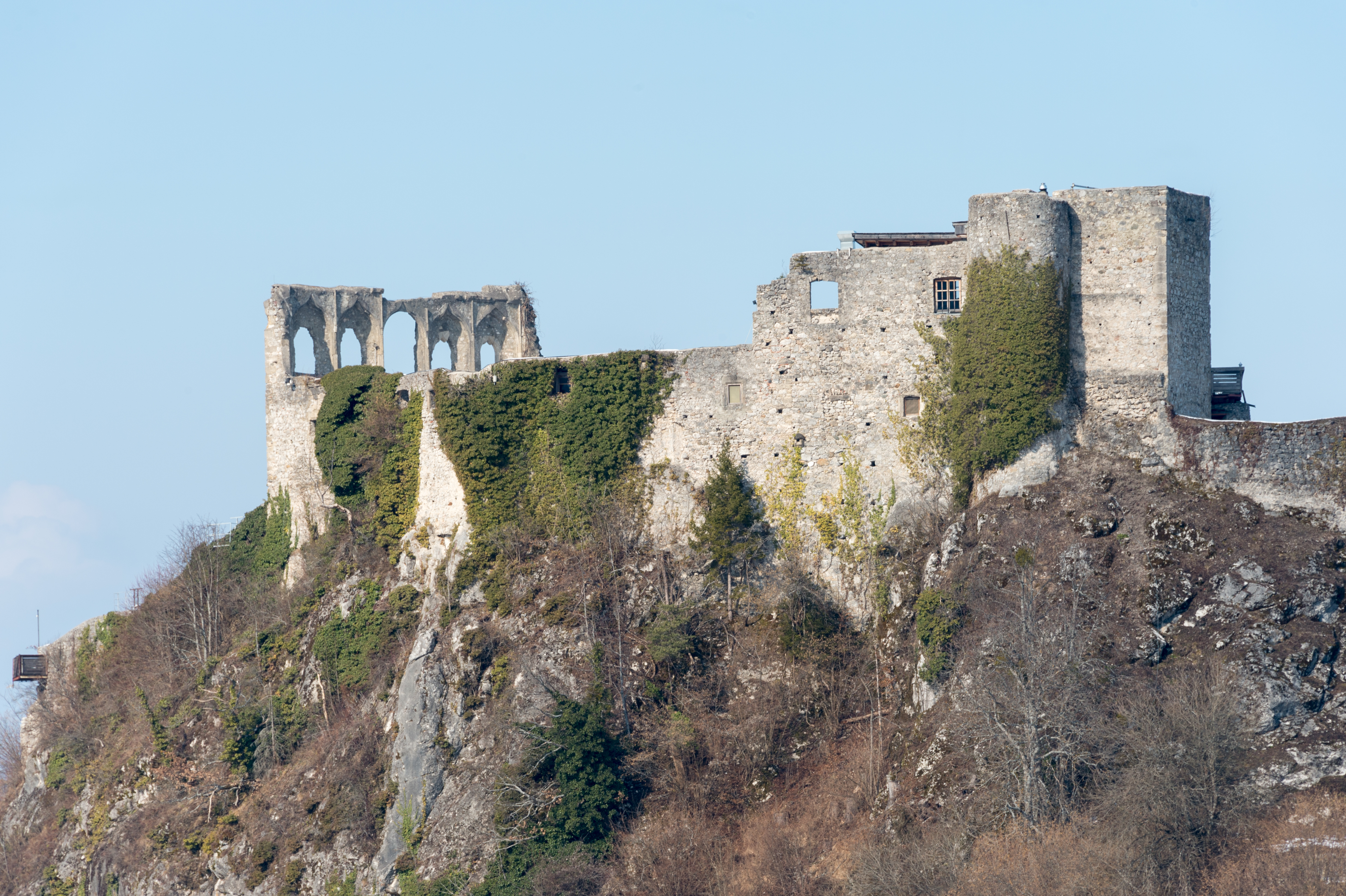
Finkenstein Castle, Carinthia

According to the Prussian State Archive Königsberg, the first representative of the family appeared authentically with one 'Niche of Roghusen' in 1388 in Roggenhausen in the State of the Teutonic Order. However, his allocation is uncertain; under its current name, the house appears authentically in 1451 with 'Michael Fincke' who calls himself 'Finck von Roggenhausen' in 1474. The family was raised to Imperial Counts (Reichsgrafen) and Counts (Grafen) in Prussia as 'Finck von Finckenstein' in 1710.

The Finck von Finckenstein's Imperial Count Diploma of 1710 determines as the cradle of the house of Finck von Finckenstein the today dilapidated Finkenstein Castle ruin in Carinthia. Hereafter the house appears for the first time 1143 with Gotwold von Finkenstein, Master of Finkenstein in Carinthia.

The Carinthian branch of the Finckensteins died in the 14th century, a junior branch, however, joined the Order of St John and after possibly participating in the Third Crusade conquered Old Prussia and Christianised the Old Prussians. According to the Imperial Count Diploma Konrad Finck von Finckenstein came during the Prussian Crusade in the 13th century with his 100 knights of the Order of St John in its drive to conquer Old Prussia alongside the Teutonic Knights.

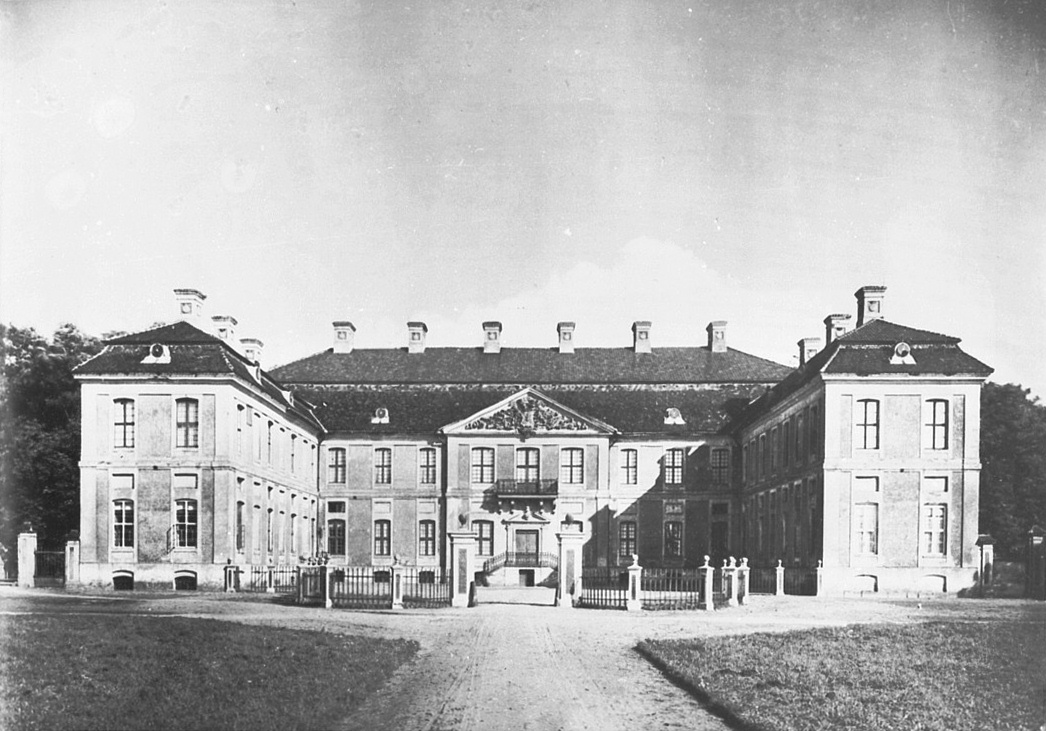
Finckenstein Palace, East Prussia

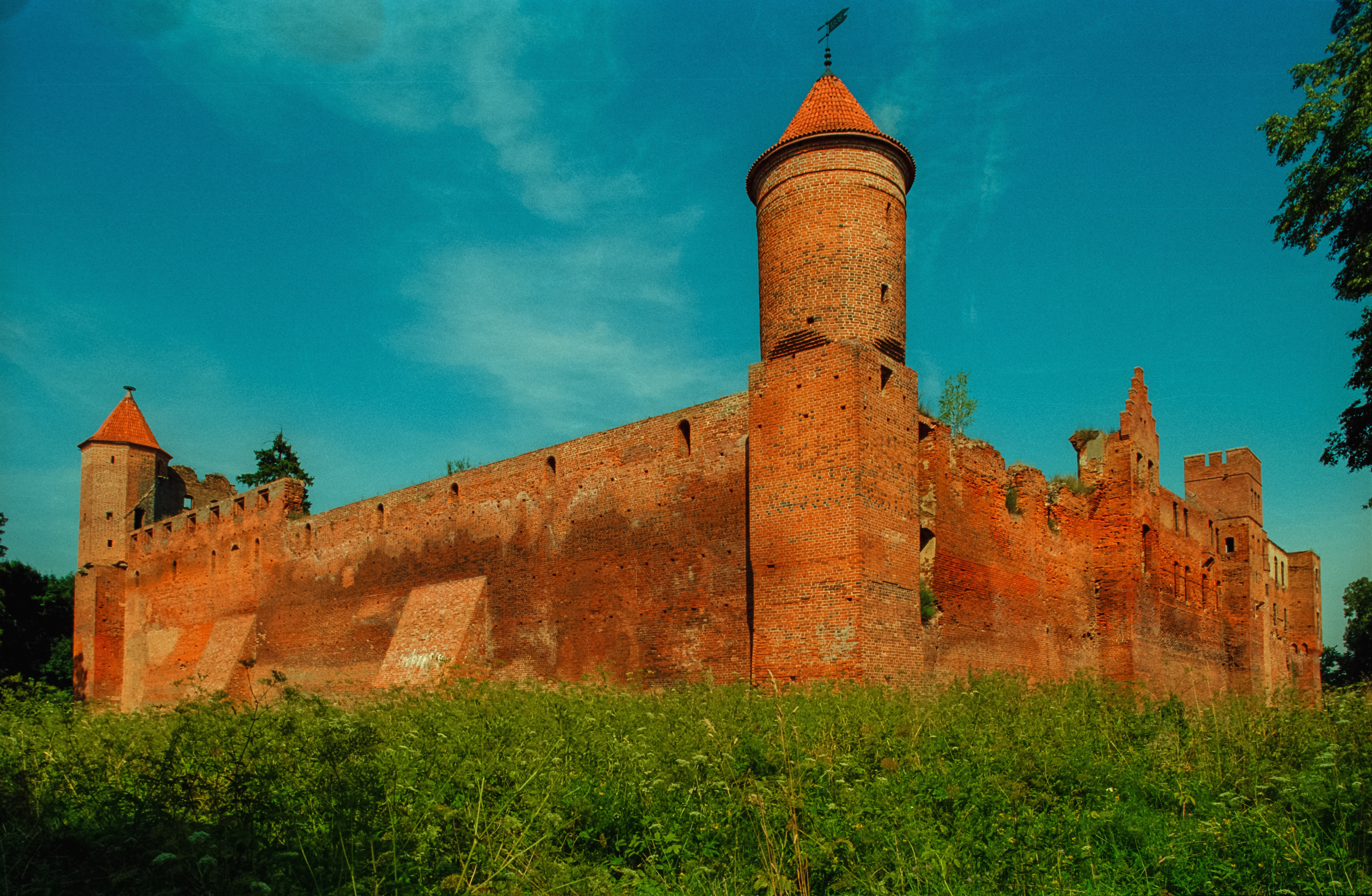
Castle Schönberg, East Prussia

== People ==
- Count Ernst Finck von Finckenstein, Electoral Prussian chamberlain, named "The Rich Shepherd", (1633–1717)
  - Count Ernst Friedrich Finck von Finckenstein, companion of King George I on his first passage to Great Britain in 1714 and later Royal Prussian war- and budget minister (1698–1753)
  - Countess Katharina Dorothea Finck von Finckenstein, great-great-grandmother of Christian IX of Denmark and ancestress of the monarchs of the United Kingdom, Russian Empire, Denmark, Norway, Kingdom of Greece, Belgium and Luxembourg (1700–1728)
- Count Albrecht Konrad Finck von Finckenstein, Prussian field marshal and governor of the Crown Prince, the future King Frederick the Great (1660–1735)
  - Count Friedrich Ludwig Finck von Finckenstein, Royal Prussian lieutenant general (1709–1785)
    - Count Karl Friedrich Ludwig Albrecht Finck von Finckenstein, Royal Prussian budget- and justice minister, chief minister of the East Prussian Government (1743–1803)
  - Count Karl-Wilhelm Finck von Finckenstein, Prussian prime minister (1714–1800)
    - Count Friedrich Ludwig Karl Finck von Finckenstein, chief minister of the East-Brandenburg ("Neumark") Government (1745–1818)
      - Count Wilhelm Karl Leopold Finck von Finckenstein, Royal Prussian lieutenant general [(1792–1877)
        - Count Karl-Wilhelm Finck von Finckenstein, German banker (1923–2011)
        - Count Hans-Werner Finck von Finckenstein, German diplomat (1926–2012)
- Count Karl Bonaventura Finck von Finckenstein, Prussian chamberlain, member of the Prussian House of Lords ("Preußisches Herrenhaus") and Master of Schönberg (1794–1865)
  - Count Bonaventura Finck von Finckenstein, Master of Jäskendorf (1872–1950)
    - Count Theodor Finck von Finckenstein, author of "Protokollarischer Ratgeber" (1923–2001)
      - Count Hans-Konrad (Hako) Finck von Finckenstein, capital sourcing director for alternative investments (born 1961)
  - Count Ottfried Finck von Finckenstein, German author (1901–1987)
  - Countess Eva Finck von Finckenstein, German politician (1903–1994)
    - Count Konrad Finck von Finckenstein, chairman of the Canadian Radio-television Telecommunications, (born 1945)
  - Count Björn Finck von Finckenstein, Namibian politician (born 1958)
- Countess Amalie Ludowika Finck von Finckenstein, mother of Russian field marshal Prince Peter zu Sayn-Wittgenstein-Berleburg
- Count Karl August Finck von Finckenstein, general of the Prussian Infantry (1835–1915)
- Count Wilhelm Heinrich Karl Finck von Finckenstein, chamberlain of German Emperor Wilhelms II and member of the Prussian House of Lords ("Preußisches Herrenhaus") (1850–1899)
- Count Albrecht Alexander Otto Finck von Finckenstein, major general (1859–1936)
- Count Konrad Wilhelm Gustav Finck von Finckenstein, major general (born 1862)
- Count Bernhard Gustav Wilhelm Finck von Finckenstein, lieutenant general (1863–1945)
- Count Heinrich-Georg Finck von Finckenstein, SA-Obergruppenführer and politician (1894–1984)
- Count Dr. med. Björn Finck von Fickenstein, medical doctor and mayor of Windhoek, capital city of Namibia (1958 - 2021)

German musician Tommy Finke also uses the pseudonym T.D. Finck von Finckenstein
