= Count Karl Leopold von Schlieben =

Count Karl Leopold
- Born: 3 February 1723; Magdeburg, Kingdom of Prussia
- Died: 18 April 1788 (aged 65); Königsberg, East Prussia
- Spouse: Countess Marie Eleanore von Lehndorff
- Issue: Marie Karoline, Countess Friedrich Wilhelm von Schlieben; Friederike Amalie, Duchess of Schleswig-Holstein-Sonderburg-Beck
- Father: Count George Adam von Schlieben
- Mother: Countess Katharina Dorothea Finck von Finckenstein

Count Karl Leopold von Schlieben (German: Karl Leopold Graf von Schlieben; 3 February 1723 – 18 April 1788) was the Prussian Minister of War between 1769 and 1772.

== Early life ==
He was born in Magdeburg. His father was Count George Adam von Schlieben (German: Georg Adam Graf von Schlieben, 5 February 1688 – 15 June 1737) and his mother was Countess Katharina Dorothea Finck von Finckenstein.

== Marriage and issue ==
He married Countess Marie Eleanore von Lehndorff (1723-1800) on 18 January 1747 in Königsberg. They had two daughters:

- Countess Marie Karoline of Schlieben (28 January 1752 – 2 August 1832); married Count Friedrich Wilhelm von Schlieben (died in 1783) and had issue. Through their only daughter Amalie (1777-1845), she is an ancestress of the Princes of Dohna-Schlobitten and Princes of Hochberg-Pless.
- Countess Friederike Amalie of Schlieben (28 February 1757 – 17 December 1827); married, on 9 March 1780 in Königsberg, Friedrich Karl Ludwig, Duke of Schleswig-Holstein-Sonderburg-Beck and had issue. Through her son, Friedrich Wilhelm, Duke of Schleswig-Holstein-Sonderburg-Glücksburg, she is an ancestress of the Royal Houses of Denmark, Greece, Norway, and the United Kingdom.

Count Karl Leopold died in Königsberg, Kingdom of Prussia.
