= Szymbark, Warmian-Masurian Voivodeship =

Szymbark
- Village
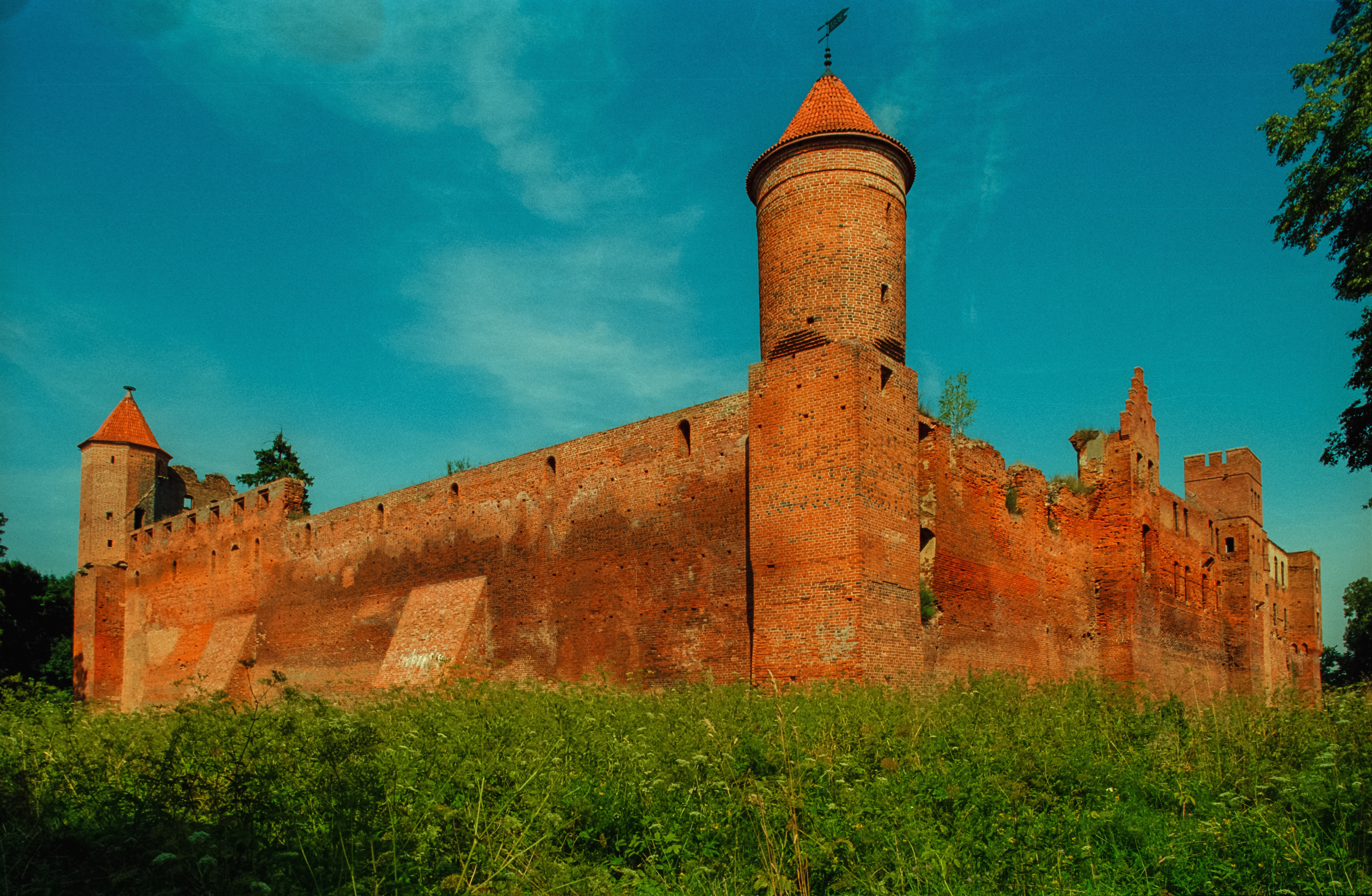
- Teutonic Knights castle ruin

- Location within Poland
- Coordinates: 53°38′54″N 19°28′58″E
- Country: Poland
- Voivodeship: Warmian-Masurian
- County: Iława
- Gmina: Iława
- Population: 395
- Time zone: UTC+1 (CET)
  - Summer (DST): UTC+2 (CEST)
- Vehicle registration: NIL

Szymbark (Polish: [ˈʂɨmbark]) is a village in the administrative district of Gmina Iława, within Iława County, Warmian-Masurian Voivodeship, in northern Poland. The village is located on the northern shore of Szymbarskie Lake.

== The castle ==
The construction of the castle began in 1301. It was built by the Teutonic Order as a summer residence of the Bishop of Pomesania. A Latin inscription above the main gate (Hec Porta Constructa Est Anno Domini MCCCLXXXVI Tempore Fratris Henrici De Skarlin Prepoziti) dates back to 1386 and mentions brother Henry of Skarlin as constructor. Sometimes he is described as the founder of the castle. The castle became property of the last Catholic and first Lutheran Bishop of Pomesania, Georg von Polentz, after the secularization of the Order. In 1699 it was bought by Ernst Graf Finck von Finckenstein and remained property of the Finckenstein family until 1945.

In April 1945, about three month after the conquest by the Soviet Union, and again in 1947 the castle was set on fire and completely destroyed. The ruins were used for the 1996 movie The Ogre by Volker Schlöndorff with John Malkovich in the title role.

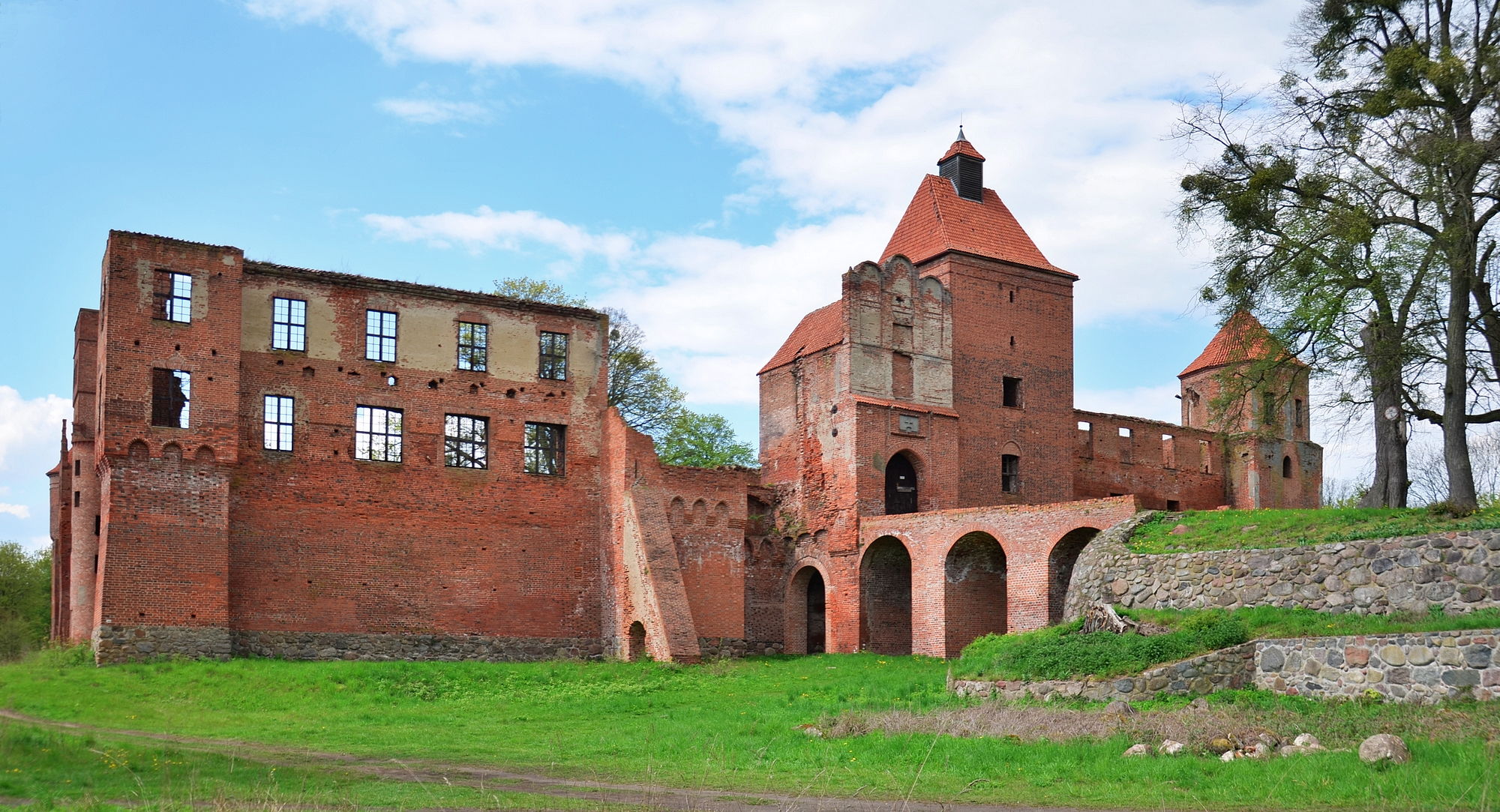
The south-east flank and main gate

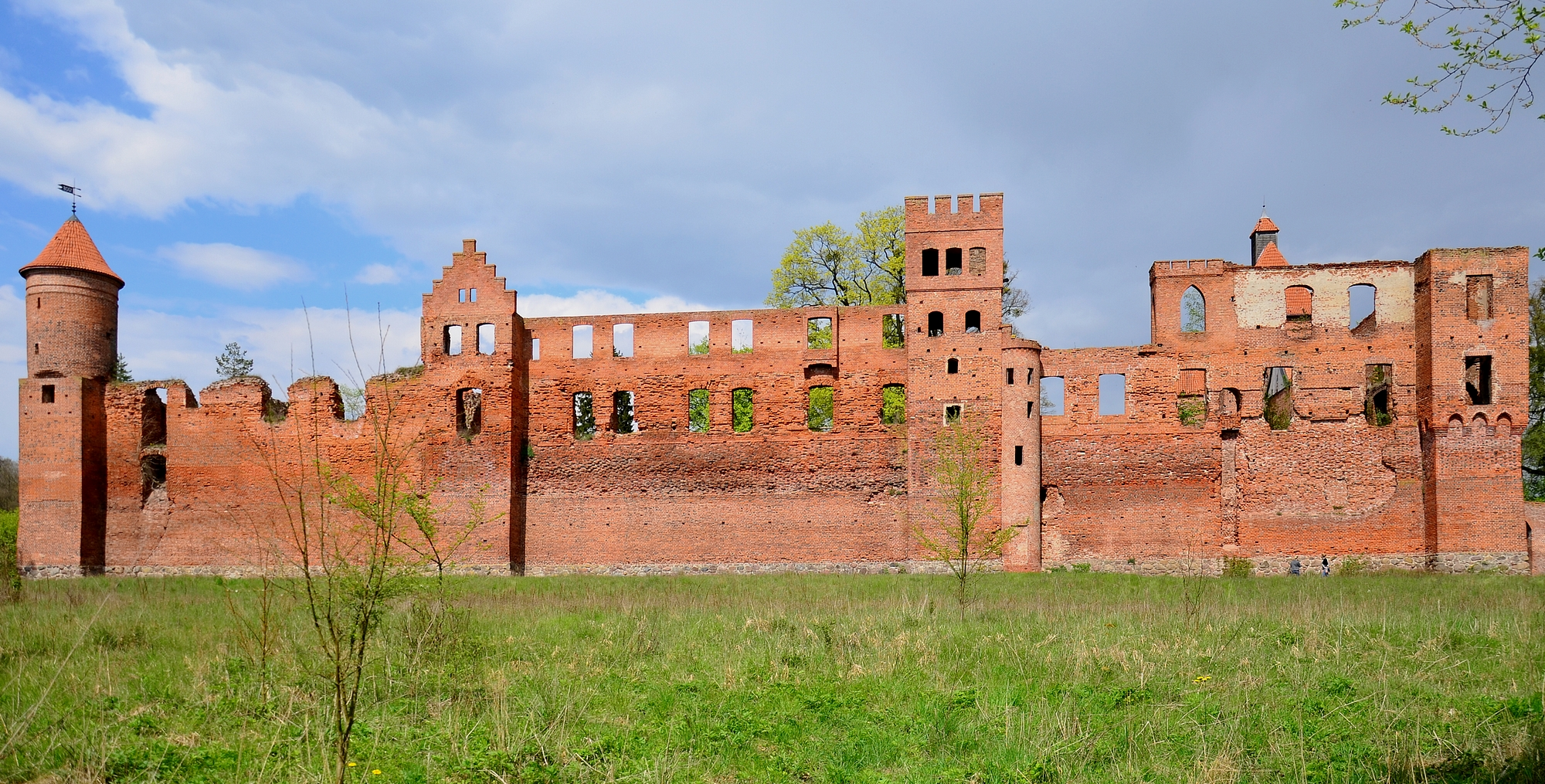
The south view

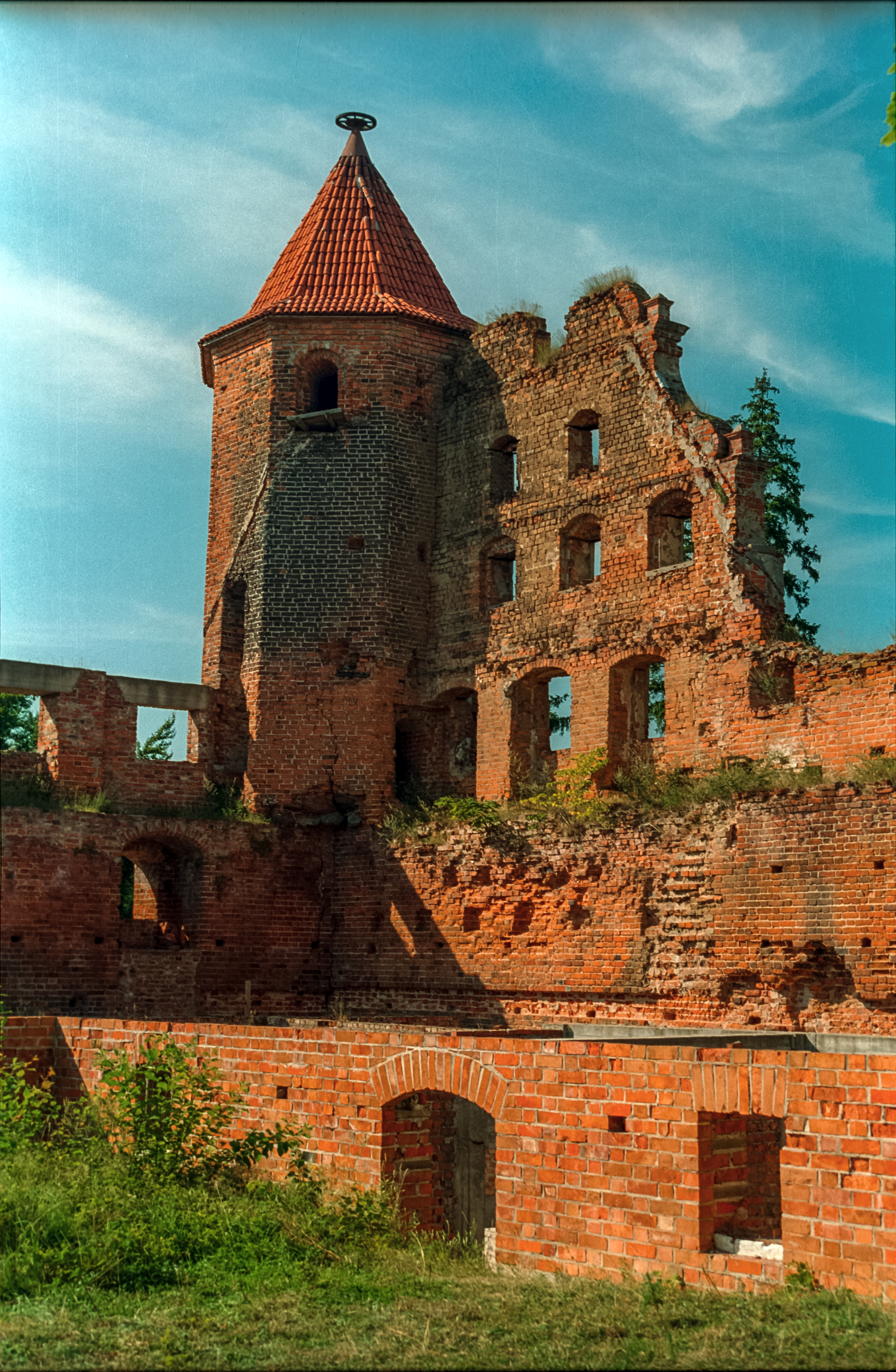
The north-west tower

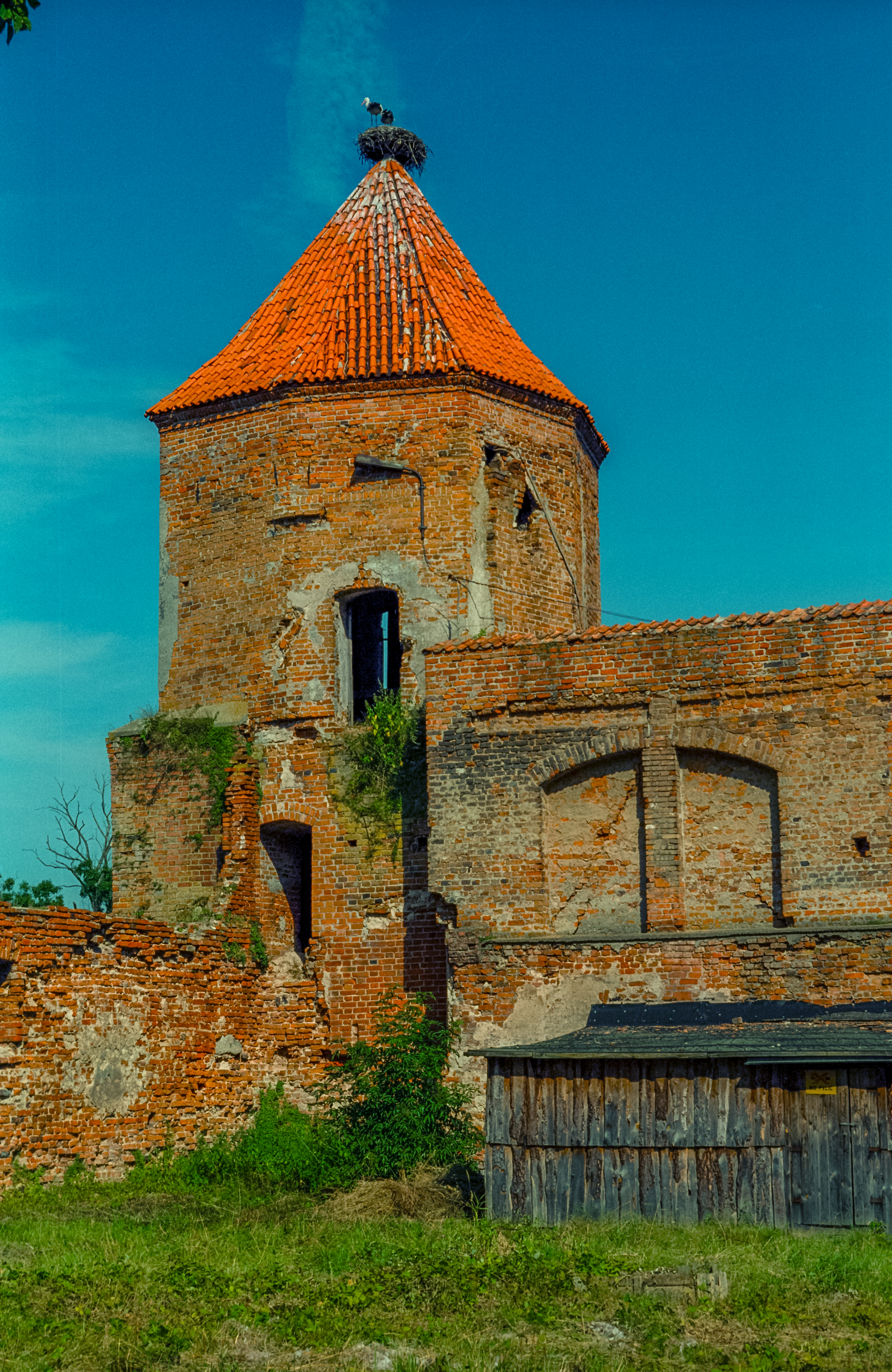
The north-east tower

== Sports ==
The local football club is LZS Zamek Szymbark. It competes in the lower leagues.

== Notable residents ==
- Katharina Dorothea Finck von Finckenstein (1700-1728), Prussian noble woman
