= Oppeln-Bronikowski =

Oppeln-Bronikowski is a surname. Notable people with the surname include:

- Friedrich von Oppeln-Bronikowski (1873–1936), German writer, translator, biographer, publisher and cultural historian
- Hermann von Oppeln-Bronikowski (1899–1966), German general
