= Friedrich Wilhelm, Duke of Schleswig-Holstein-Sonderburg-Glücksburg =

Friedrich Wilhelm
- Duke of Schleswig-Holstein-Sonderburg-Glücksburg
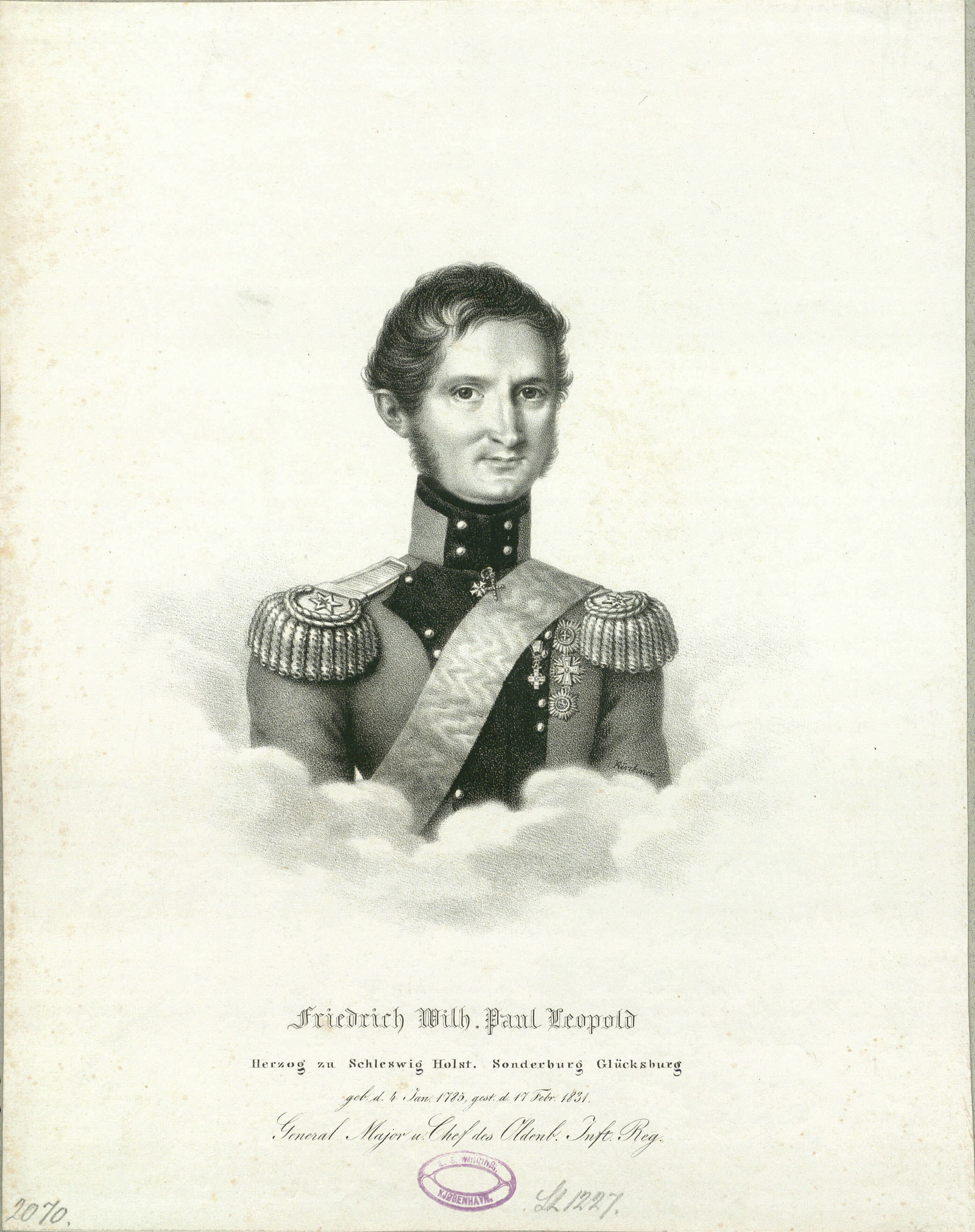
- Lithograph c. 1830

Duke of Schleswig-Holstein-Sonderburg-Beck
- Reign: 25 March 1816 – 6 July 1825
- Predecessor: Friedrich Karl Ludwig

Duke of Schleswig-Holstein-Sonderburg-Glücksburg
- Reign: 6 July 1825 – 17 February 1831
- Successor: Karl
- Born: 4 January 1785; Lindenau, Prussia
- Died: 17 February 1831 (aged 46); Gottorf Castle, Schleswig
- Spouse: Princess Louise Caroline of Hesse-Kassel (m. 1810)
- Issue: Princess Luise Marie; Princess Friederike; Karl, Duke of Schleswig-Holstein-Sonderburg-Glücksburg; Friedrich, Duke of Schleswig-Holstein-Sonderburg-Glücksburg; Prince Wilhelm; Christian IX of Denmark; Princess Luise; Prince Julius; Prince Johann; Prince Nikolaus
Names
- Frederick William Paul Leopold; Friedrich Wilhelm Paul Leopold (German)
- House: Schleswig-Holstein-Sonderburg-Beck (by birth) Glücksburg (founder)
- Father: Friedrich Karl Ludwig, Duke of Schleswig-Holstein-Sonderburg-Beck
- Mother: Countess Friederike of Schlieben

Friedrich Wilhelm, Duke of Schleswig-Holstein-Sonderburg-Glücksburg (German: Friedrich Wilhelm Paul Leopold; Danish: Frederik Vilhelm Paul Leopold; 4 January 1785 – 17 February 1831) was a German-Danish prince and officer who was the Duke of Schleswig-Holstein-Sonderburg-Beck from 1816 to 1825, and the Duke of Schleswig-Holstein-Sonderburg-Glücksburg from 1825 to 1831. Friedrich Wilhelm is the progenitor of the House of Glücksburg.

Friedrich Wilhelm was the only son of Friedrich Karl Ludwig, Duke of Schleswig-Holstein-Sonderburg-Beck and Countess Friederike of Schlieben, and was a member of the ducal house of Schleswig-Holstein-Sonderburg-Beck, a junior male branch of the House of Oldenburg. From 1804, he lived in his family's original home in Denmark-Norway, where he made a career as an officer of the Danish army during the Napoleonic Wars. His 1810 marriage to Princess Louise Caroline of Hesse-Kassel meant that Friedrich Wilhelm became the brother-in-law of King Frederick VI of Denmark, as his wife's elder sister was married to the king. At the death of his father in 1816, he inherited the title of Duke of Schleswig-Holstein-Sonderburg-Beck as Frederick William IV, and in 1825, upon the extinction of the elder Glücksburg line in 1824, King Frederick VI transferred Glücksburg Castle to his brother-in-law and changed his title to Duke of Schleswig-Holstein-Sonderburg-Glücksburg.

Duke Friedrich Wilhelm and Duchess Louise Caroline had ten children, of which his eldest son Karl succeeded him as Duke of Glücksburg, and his fourth son became King of Denmark in 1863 as King Christian IX.

== Early life ==
=== Birth and family ===
Friedrich Wilhelm was born on 4 January 1785 at the manor house in Lindenau, near the town of Braunsberg in East Prussia, the most northeastern province of the Kingdom of Prussia (today Lipowina in Poland). He was the third and youngest child and only son of Friedrich Karl Ludwig, Duke of Schleswig-Holstein-Sonderburg-Beck and his wife, Countess Friederike of Schlieben. He was baptized with the names Frederick William Paul Leopold (Note: German: Friedrich Wilhelm Paul Leopold; Danish: Frederik Vilhelm Paul Leopold. In Germany he is usually known under the names Friedrich Wilhelm, whereas in Denmark he is usually just known under the name Vilhelm.) and had his distant relative, Crown Prince Frederick of Denmark (later King Frederick VI), as his godfather.

Prince Friedrich Wilhelm's father was the head of the ducal house of Schleswig-Holstein-Sonderburg-Beck, a junior male branch of the House of Oldenburg. The family descended from King Christian III of Denmark's younger son, John the Younger, Duke of Schleswig-Holstein-Sonderburg, whose grandson Duke August Philipp severed his ties with Denmark and emigrated to Germany. There he acquired the manor of Haus Beck in Westphalia, after which the lineage was named Schleswig-Holstein-Sonderburg-Beck. His sons and their descendants went into Prussian, Polish and Russian service. Most recently, both Friedrich Wilhelm's father and grandfather held important positions in the Royal Prussian Army.

=== Childhood and education ===
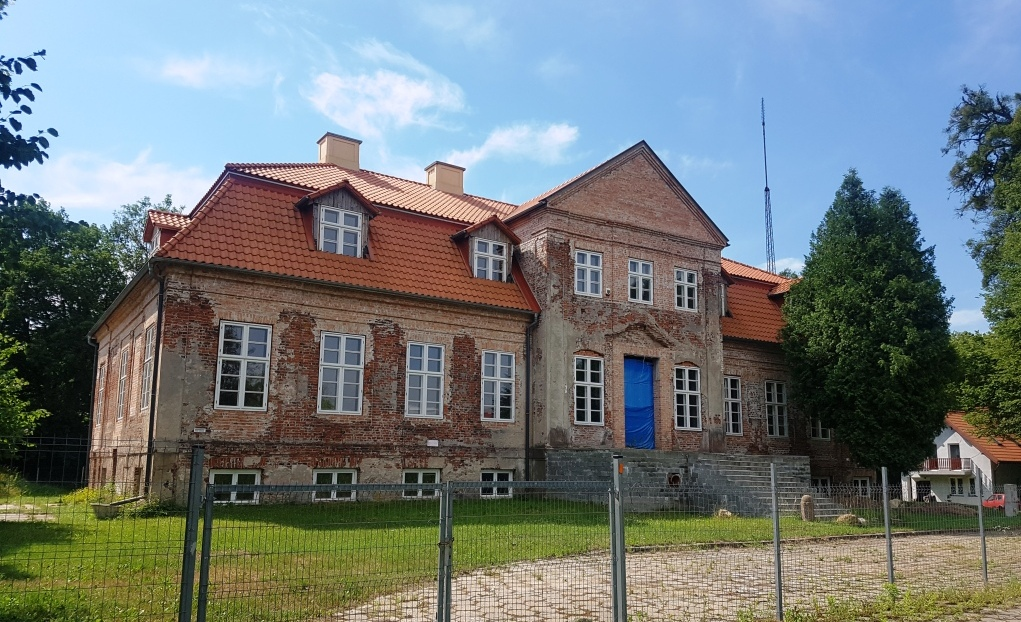
Prince Friedrich Wilhelm's childhood home, the manor house in Lindenau

Prince Friedrich Wilhelm grew up with his two older sisters Friederike and Louise at Lindenau manor, where he received his first education at home. In 1798, Wilhelm's father retired from his Prussian military service in Königsberg and settled in Leipzig to study for a few years. At the same time, the thirteen year old Prince Friedrich Wilhelm was sent to the Knight academy in Brandenburg an der Havel where he received his education from 1798 to 1802, after which he studied at the University of Leipzig from 1803 under the supervision of the father.

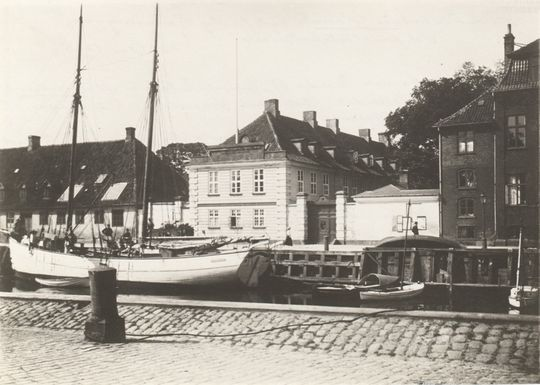
The Royal Horse Guards Barracks in Copenhagen in the 19th century.

Although Friedrich Wilhelm's ancestors had been in Prussian service, the father was no longer on good terms with the Prussian king due to some unfortunate dispositions, and therefore wanted to find career opportunities for his son elsewhere. In 1804, his father sent him to the family's original home in Denmark-Norway. Already in 1803, the boy's godfather, Crown Prince Frederick, had appointed him rittmeister à la suite in the Royal Horse Guards and the following year he moved to Copenhagen where he was housed in the Royal Horse Guards Barracks by Frederiksholms Kanal in central Copenhagen.

=== Military career ===
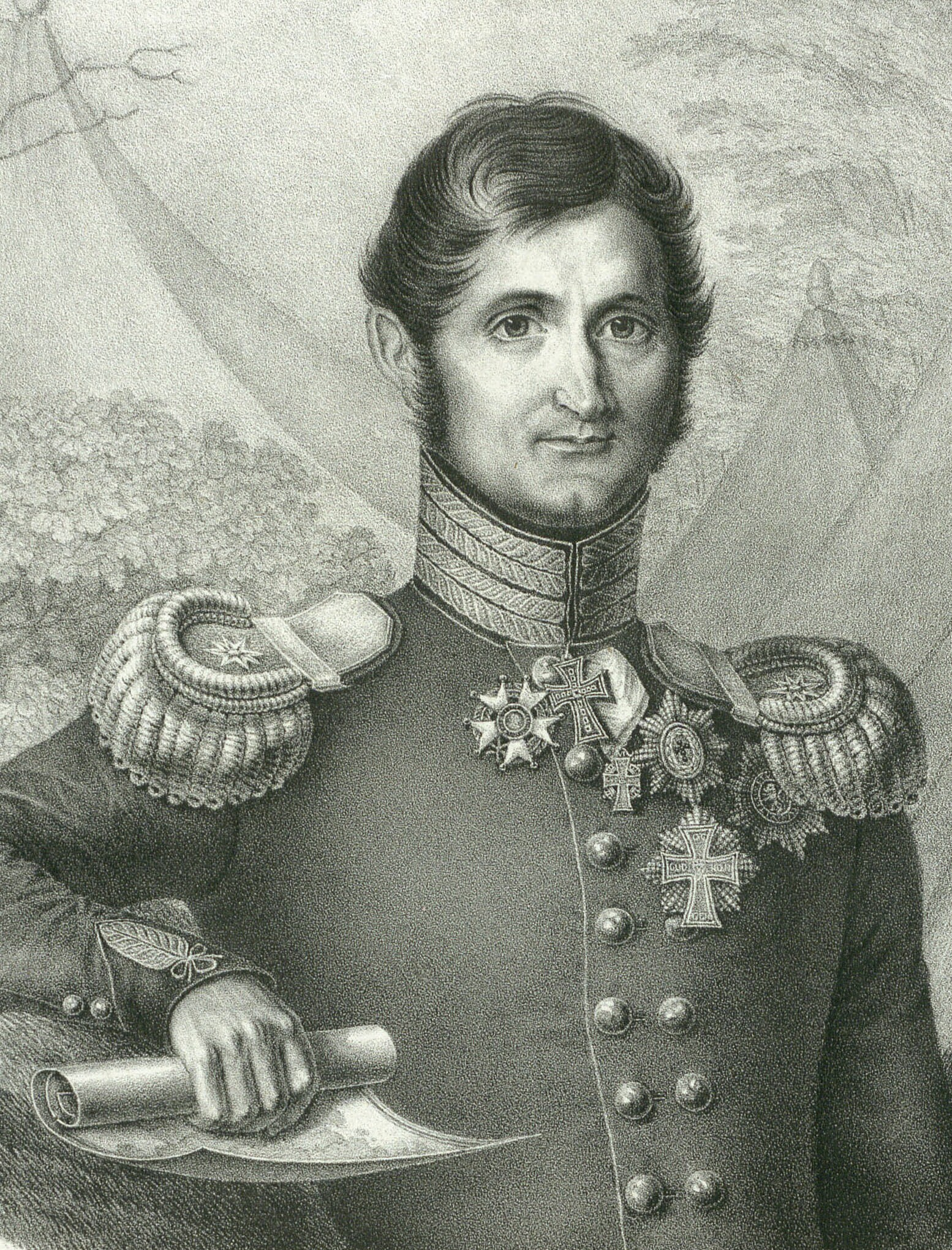
Litograph of Friedrich Wilhelm in uniform by Timm Bernhard Wilms.

Subsequently, he made a career as an officer of the Danish army during the Napoleonic Wars. After just one year in Copenhagen, Friedrich Wilhelm was, at his own request, transferred to the Duchy of Holstein, where the Danish army maintained guard duty along the Danish monarchy's southern border. From 1805 to 1807, he served there as second rittmeiser in the Life Regiment Dragoons, where he took part in guarding the border and several times had the opportunity to demonstrate good military skills, especially in reconnaissance. However, after the British bombardment of Copenhagen in 1807, Denmark allied with France and the army was transferred to Zealand, just as Friedrich Wilhelm also returned to service in the capital.

== Marriage ==
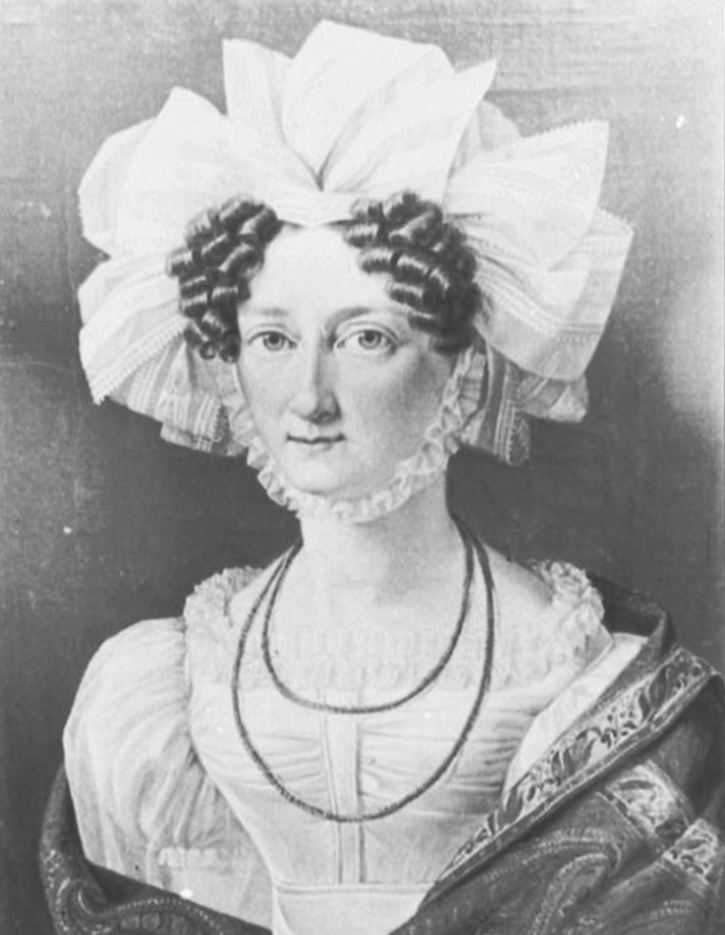
Friedrich Wilhelm's wife, Princess Louise Caroline of Hesse-Kassel. Portrait by Carl Andreas August Goos, 1829 (Glücksburg Castle).

In 1809, Friedrich Wilhelm was appointed a major at the general staff of the duchies of Schleswig and Holstein, and was quartered with the army's chief of staff, Prince Charles of Hesse-Kassel, at Gottorp Castle. There, he met Prince Carl's youngest daughter and his distant relative, the twenty year old Princess Louise Caroline of Hesse-Kassel (28 September 1789 – 13 March 1867), who was a granddaughter of Frederik V of Denmark through her mother, Princess Louise of Denmark. Friedrich Wilhelm and Louise Caroline were engaged in November 1809, and were married on 26 January 1810 in the chapel of Gottorp Castle. The wedding was a quiet wartime wedding without the participation of Friedrich Wilhelm's parents or his godfather, King Frederick VI.

This marriage meant that Friedrich Wilhelm had now also become brother-in-law to King Frederick VI of Denmark, as his new wife's elder sister, Marie of Hesse-Kassel, was married to the king. Friedrich Wilhelm and Louise Caroline had ten children.

== Duke ==
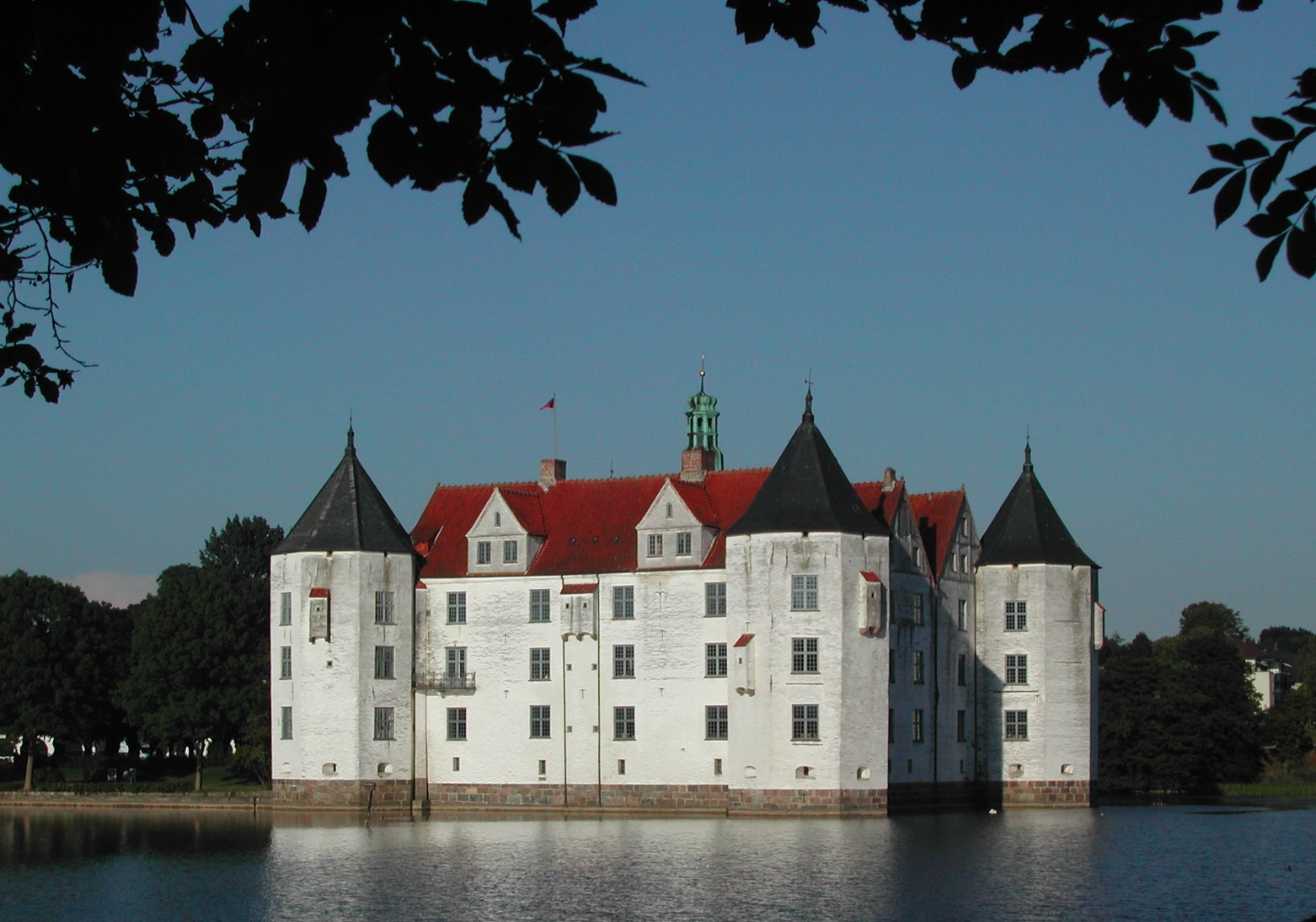
Glücksburg Castle, seat of the eponymous ducal branches of the House of Oldenburg (2005)

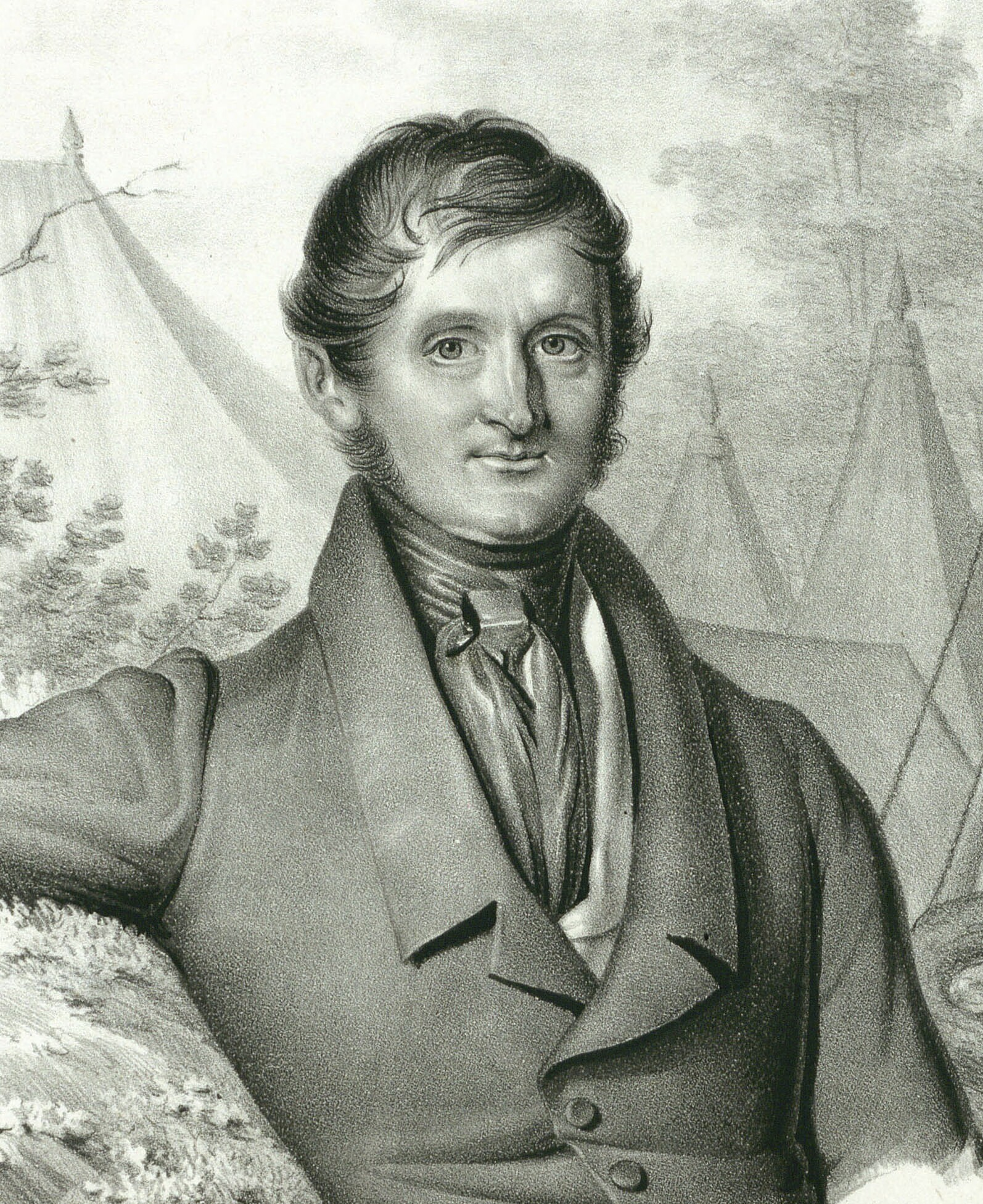
Litograph of Friedrich Wilhelm in 1831 by Johan Friedrich Fritz.

On 25 March 1816, Friedrich Wilhelm succeeded his father as Duke of Schleswig-Holstein-Sonderburg-Beck. On 6 July 1825, after the elder Glücksburg ducal line had become extinct in 1824, King Frederick VI transferred Glücksburg Castle to his brother-in-law and changed his title to Duke of Schleswig-Holstein-Sonderburg-Glücksburg:

On the 6th of July, His Majesty has been pleased to most graciously allow His Serene Highness, Duke Friedrich Wilhelm Paul Leopold of Schleswig-Holstein-Sonderburg-Beck, for himself and all his legitimate descendants, to also bear the ducal name and title of Duke of Glücksburg.

Friedrich Wilhelm died just aged 46 on 17 February 1831 at Gottorp Castle.

== Legacy ==
Duke Friedrich Wilhelm is the progenitor of the House of Glücksburg and founded a line that includes the Royal Houses of Denmark, Greece, Norway, and the Commonwealth realms.

His grandchildren include among others Frederik VIII of Denmark, Queen Alexandra of the United Kingdom, George I of Greece, Empress Maria Feodorovna of Russia, Crown Princess Thyra of Hanover, Duchess of Cumberland and Teviotdale, and Friedrich Ferdinand, Duke of Schleswig-Holstein.

== Honours ==
- Grand Cross of the Dannebrog, 15 January 1811
- Knight of the Elephant, 19 December 1811
- Cross of Honour of the Order of the Dannebrog, 19 December 1811

== Issue ==
- Princess Luise Marie Friederike of Schleswig-Holstein-Sonderburg-Glücksburg (23 October 1810 – 11 May 1869).
- Princess Friederike Karoline Juliane of Schleswig-Holstein-Sonderburg-Glücksburg (9 October 1811 – 10 July 1902).
- Karl, Duke of Schleswig-Holstein-Sonderburg-Glücksburg (30 September 1813 – 24 October 1878).
- Friedrich, Duke of Schleswig-Holstein-Sonderburg-Glücksburg (23 October 1814 – 27 November 1885).
- Prince Wilhelm of Schleswig-Holstein-Sonderburg-Glücksburg (10 April 1816 – 5 September 1893).
- Christian IX, King of Denmark (8 April 1818 – 29 January 1906).
- Princess Luise, Abbess of Itzehoe (18 November 1820 – 30 November 1894).
- Prince Julius of Schleswig-Holstein-Sonderburg-Glücksburg (14 October 1824 – 1 June 1903).
- Prince Johann of Schleswig-Holstein-Sonderburg-Glücksburg (5 December 1825 – 27 May 1911).
- Prince Nikolaus of Schleswig-Holstein-Sonderburg-Glücksburg (22 December 1828 – 18 August 1849 in an accident).

== Notes ==
Friedrich Wilhelm House of Schleswig-Holstein-Sonderburg-Glücksburg Cadet branch of the House of Oldenburg Born: 4 January 1785 Died: 17 February 1831
Regnal titles
Preceded by Friedrich Karl Ludwig	Duke of Schleswig-Holstein-Sonderburg-Beck; 25 March 1816–6 July 1825	Succeeded by Title abolished
Vacant Title last held by Friedrich Heinrich Wilhelm	Duke of Schleswig-Holstein-Sonderburg-Glücksburg; 6 July 1825–17 February 1831	Succeeded by Karl
