= Friedrich Karl Ludwig, Duke of Schleswig-Holstein-Sonderburg-Beck =

Friedrich Karl Ludwig
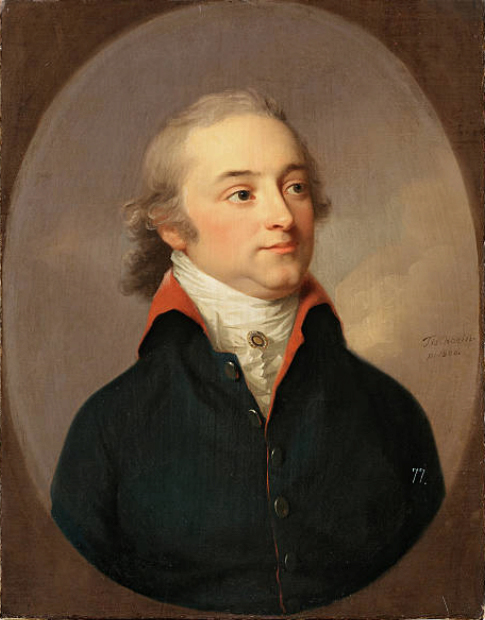
- Portrait, c. 1800

Duke of Schleswig-Holstein-Sonderburg-Beck
- Reign: 24 February 1775 – March 1816
- Predecessor: Peter August
- Successor: Friedrich Wilhelm
- Born: 20 August 1757; Königsberg, Prussia
- Died: 24 April 1816 (aged 58); Wellingsbüttel Manor, Hamburg
- Spouse: Countess Friederike of Schlieben (m. 1780)
- Issue: Princess Friederike; Princess Luise; Friedrich Wilhelm
- House: Schleswig-Holstein-Sonderburg-Beck
- Father: Prince Karl Anton August of Schleswig-Holstein-Sonderburg-Beck
- Mother: Countess Charlotte of Dohna-Schlodien

Friedrich Karl Ludwig, Duke of Schleswig-Holstein-Sonderburg-Beck (Danish: Frederik Carl Ludvig; 20 August 1757 – 24 April 1816) was the ninth and penultimate Duke of Schleswig-Holstein-Sonderburg-Beck. Friedrich Karl Ludwig was the son of Prince Karl Anton August of Schleswig-Holstein-Sonderburg-Beck and Countess Charlotte of Dohna-Schlodien.

== Life ==
Friedrich Karl Ludwig was born in Königsberg, Kingdom of Prussia. At the age of two he lost his father who died at the battle of Kundersdorf. He joined the Prussian Army in 1777 upon the request of King Frederick the Great. By 1781 he was a staff officer in the Regiment von Schlieben and by 1787 he commanded a grenadier battalion based in Königsberg. He assisted in the suppression of the 1794 Kościuszko Uprising and was Governor of Kraków in 1795. He retired from Prussian service as a lieutenant general in 1797 and spent the rest of his life improving agriculture in Holstein. He died in Wellingsbüttel Manor, now part of Hamburg.

He was a recipient of the Order of the Elephant, Order of St. Alexander Nevsky, Order of the Red Eagle, and the Order of Saint Hubert.

== Marriage and issue ==
Friedrich married Countess Friederike of Schlieben on 8 March 1780 in Königsberg. She was the second and youngest daughter of Count Karl Leopold of Schlieben and Countess Marie Eleonore von Lehndorff.

At the time, the marriage was not looked upon favorably by his family, because the Schlieben family, although a noble one, didn't belong to an exclusive circle of either reigning families or ancient noble families, which would be more acceptable. Friedrich and Friederike had three children:

- Princess Friederike of Schleswig-Holstein-Sonderburg-Beck (13 December 1780 – 19 January 1862) ⚭ 1800 Gottlob Samuel von Richthofen, Baron von Richthofen (1769–1808)
- Princess Luise of Schleswig-Holstein-Sonderburg-Beck (28 September 1783 – 24 November 1803) ⚭ 1803 Frederick Ferdinand, Duke of Anhalt-Köthen
- Friedrich Wilhelm, Duke of Schleswig-Holstein-Sonderburg-Glücksburg (4 January 1785 – 27 February 1831)

Friedrich was succeeded as duke by his son, Friedrich Wilhelm, Duke of Schleswig-Holstein-Sonderburg-Glücksburg.

== Ancestry ==
Ancestors of Friedrich Karl Ludwig, Duke of Schleswig-Holstein-Sonderburg-Beck

8. Friedrich Ludwig, Duke of Schleswig-Holstein-Sonderburg-Beck
4. Peter August, Duke of Schleswig-Holstein-Sonderburg-Beck
9. Princess Louise Charlotte of Schleswig-Holstein-Sonderburg-Augustenburg
2. Prince Karl Anton August of Schleswig-Holstein-Sonderburg-Beck
10. Philip, Landgrave of Hesse-Philippsthal
5. Princess Sophie of Hesse-Philippsthal
11. Countess Catherine Amalia of Solms-Laubach
1. Friedrich Karl Ludwig, Duke of Schleswig-Holstein-Sonderburg-Beck
12. Alexander, Count and Burgrave of Dohna-Schlobitten
6. Albrecht Christoph, Count and Burgrave of Dohna-Schlobitten in Leistenau
13. Countess and Burgravine Amalie Louise of Dohna
3. Countess Charlotte of Dohna-Leistenau
14. Friedrich Ludwig, Duke of Schleswig-Holstein-Sonderburg-Beck (= 8)
7. Princess Sophie Henriette of Schleswig-Holstein-Sonderburg-Beck
15. Princess Louise Charlotte of Schleswig-Holstein-Sonderburg-Augustenburg (= 9)

Friedrich Karl Ludwig, Duke of Schleswig-Holstein-Sonderburg-Beck House of Schleswig-Holstein-Sonderburg-Beck Cadet branch of the House of Oldenburg Born: 20 August 1757 Died: 24 April 1816
Regnal titles
Preceded by Peter August	Duke of Schleswig-Holstein-Sonderburg-Beck; 24 February 1775–25 March 1816	Succeeded by Friedrich Wilhelm
