= Countess Charlotte of Dohna-Leistenau =

Charlotte of Dohna-Schlodien in Leistenau
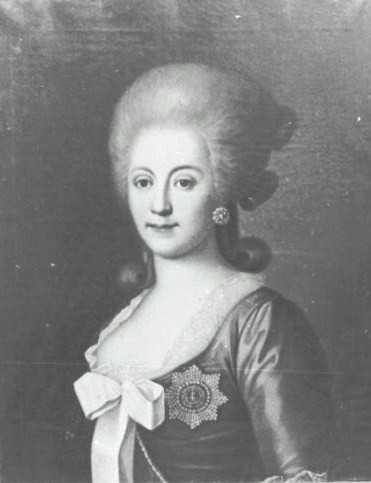
- Born: 3 July 1738; Königsberg
- Died: 21 April 1785 (aged 46); 21 April 1786 (aged 47); Wolde
- Spouses: Prince Karl Anton August of Schleswig-Holstein-Sonderburg-Beck; Count Friedrich Detlev von Moltke
- Issue: Friedrich Karl Ludwig, Duke of Schleswig-Holstein-Sonderburg-Beck
- Father: Albrecht Christoph, Count of Dohna-Schlodien in Leistenau
- Mother: Princess Sophie Henriette of Schleswig-Holstein-Sonderburg-Beck

Countess Friederike Charlotte Antoinette of Dohna-Schlodien in Leistenau (German: Friederike, Burggräfin und Gräfin zu Dohna-Schlodien) (3 July 1738 – 21 April 1785 or 21 April 1786) was a German noblewoman.

Charlotte, as she was known, was born in Königsberg, Prussia, on 3 July 1738. She was the daughter of Albrecht Christoph, Count (or Burgrave) of Dohna-Schlodien-Leistenau, by his third wife Princess Sophie Henriette of Schleswig-Holstein-Sonderburg-Beck. She was married, firstly, to her first cousin Karl Anton August, Prince of Schleswig-Holstein-Sonderburg-Beck (1727–1759) in Königsberg on 30 May 1754.

They had an only child, Friedrich Karl Ludwig, Duke of Schleswig-Holstein-Sonderburg-Beck.

She was the descendant of the Oxenstierna noble family of Sweden, which was related to many of the old noble families of Sweden and Norway including Charles VIII of Sweden. As the male-line great-grandmother of Christian IX of Denmark, she is an ancestor of the monarchs of Norway, Denmark, Greece and the United Kingdom.

Her first husband died in 1759 from wounds sustained at the Battle of Kunersdorf. She later married Count Friedrich Detlev von Moltke, as her second husband, on 21 May 1777. They had no issue.

== Ancestry ==
Ancestors of Countess Charlotte of Dohna-Leistenau

8. Frederick, Burgrave of Dohna
4. Alexander, Count and Burgrave of Dohna-Schlodien in Leistenau
9. Espérance du Puy de Montbrun
2. Albrecht Christoph, Count and Burgrave of Dohna-Schlodien in Leistenau
10. Christoph Delphicus, Count and Burgrave of Dohna
5. Amalie Louise, Countess and Burgravine of Dohna
11. Countess Anna Oxenstierna of Korsholm and Wasa
1. Countess Charlotte of Dohna-Leistenau
12. August Philipp, Duke of Schleswig-Holstein-Sonderburg-Beck
6. Frederick Louis, Duke of Schleswig-Holstein-Sonderburg-Beck
13. Countess Marie Sibylle of Nassau-Saarbrücken
3. Princess Sophie Henriette of Schleswig-Holstein-Sonderburg-Beck
14. Ernest Günther, Duke of Schleswig-Holstein-Sonderburg-Augustenburg
7. Princess Louise Charlotte of Schleswig-Holstein-Sonderburg-Augustenburg
15. Auguste of Schleswig-Holstein-Sonderburg-Glücksburg
