= Friedrich von Oppeln-Bronikowski =

German writer, translator, publisher and cultural historian

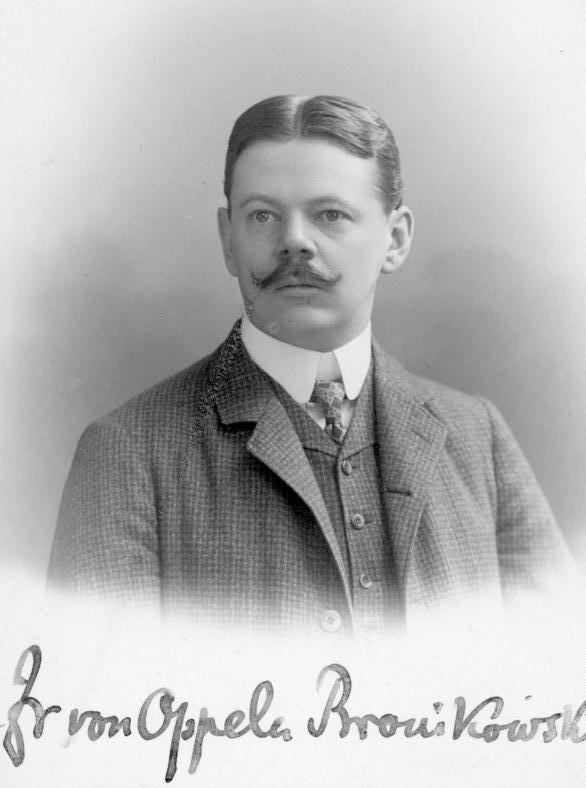
- Friedrich von Oppeln-Bronikowski (dated ca. 1900-1910)
- Born: 7 April 1873; Kassel
- Died: 9 October 1936 (aged 63); Berlin
- Occupations: writer, publisher, translator and historian

Friedrich von Oppeln-Bronikowski (7 April 1873 – 9 October 1936) was a German writer, translator, publisher and cultural historian. His grave is located in the Stahnsdorf South-Western Cemetery near Berlin.

== Life ==
Friedrich von Oppeln-Bronikowski was born into a traditionalist family of military officers in Kassel. He began a similarly ambitious military career himself, attending a cadet academy then joining a Hussar regiment. However, a serious riding accident brought his military career to a sudden end.

=== Studies and writing career ===
Oppeln-Bronikowski turned his attention to a civilian education, studying philosophy and archaeology in Berlin. Afterwards he lived as an independent author first in Italy then in Switzerland. In 1905 he returned to Berlin and published numerous novels, novellas, and short stories. Military life and Prussian history were frequent subjects of his works and appealed to the interests of his contemporaries. He also wrote biographical compositions and essays on cultural history.

=== Translations ===
Oppeln-Bronikowski translated a great deal of French and Belgian literature, including the works of Maurice Maeterlinck. Notably, he also translated Niccolò Machiavelli's The Prince from Italian. With the beginning of the First World War in 1914, Oppeln-Bronikowski was summoned for military service and served with the General Staff. From 1920 to 1923 he was active in the foreign ministry.

=== Writings against Antisemitism ===
In his later works Oppeln-Bronikowski opposed the growing antisemitism in Germany. He advocated equitable treatment of Jews with Antisemitismus? Eine unparteiische Prüfung ("Antisemitism? An objective examination") in 1920 and Gerechtigkeit! Zur Lösung der Judenfrage ("Justice! Resolving the Jewish question") in 1932.

== Selected works ==
- Aus dem Sattel geplaudert und Anderes, 1898
- Der Rebell, 1908
- Antisemitismus ? Eine unparteiische Prüfung, 1920
- Gerechtigkeit! Zur Lösung der Judenfrage, 1932
- Der große König als erster Diener seines Staates, 1934
- Der alte Dessauer, 1936
- Der Exot, 2012 (Manuscript 1929)
