= Lehndorff =

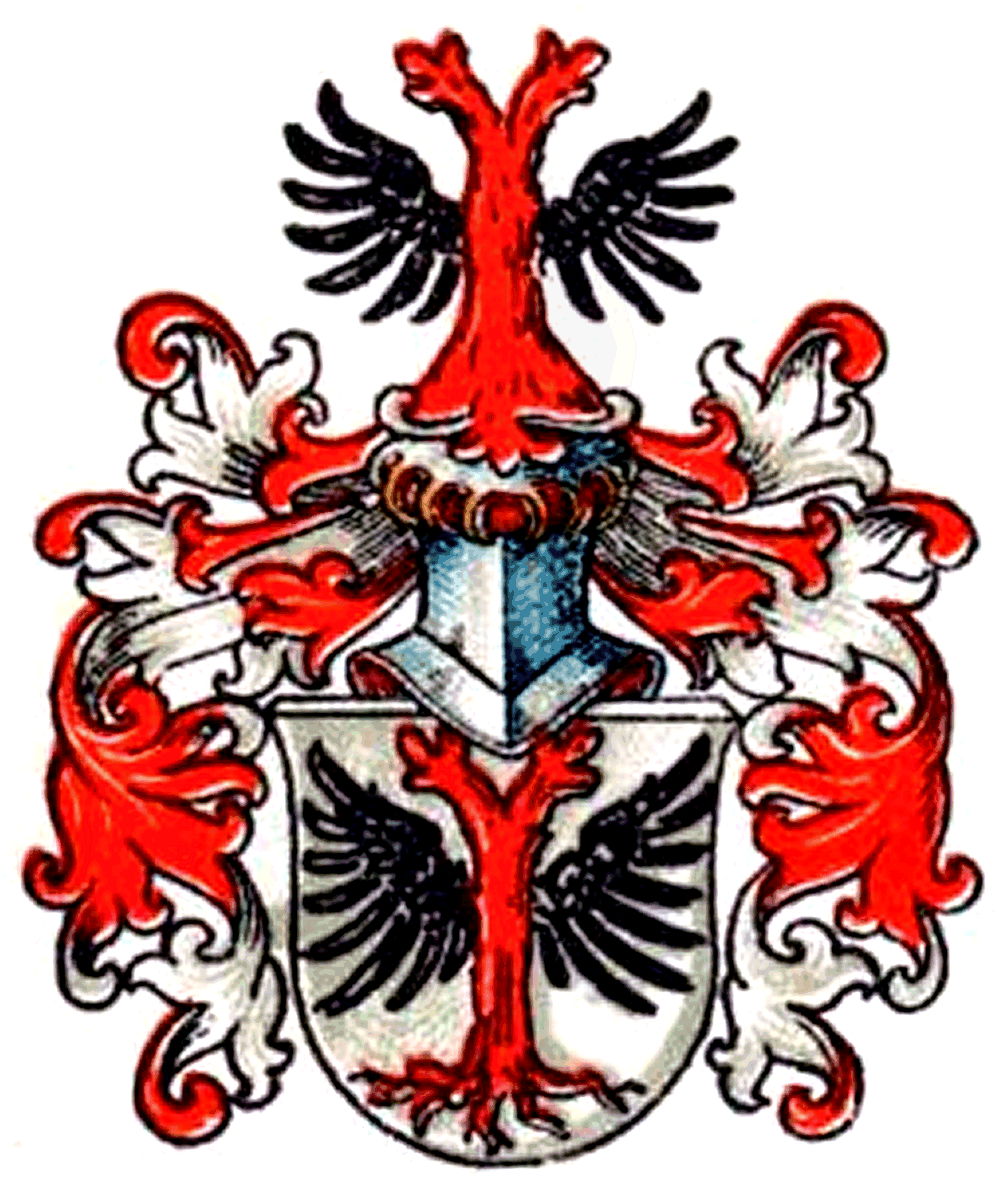
Coat of arms of the Lehndorff family

The House of Lehndorff is an old German noble family from former East Prussia, first recorded in 1236. Members of the family occupied many important military positions within the Kingdom of Prussia. They held the title of Imperial Count, granted to them on 23 February 1687 by Leopold I, Holy Roman Emperor.

== Notable members ==
- Meinhard von Lehndorff (1590–1639), Landrat of Rastenburg
- Gerhard Ahasverus Graf von Lehndorff (1637–1688), author
- Ernst Ahasverus Graf von Lehndorff (1688–1727)
- Ernst Ahasverus Heinrich Graf von Lehndorff (1727–1811), Royal Prussian Kammerherr
- Karl Friedrich Ludwig Graf von Lehndorff (1770–1854), Prussian General of the Napoleonic Wars
- Heinrich Graf Ahasverus Otto Magnus von Lehndorff (1829–1905), Generaladjutant of Kaiser Wilhelm I
- Georg Graf von Lehndorff (1833–1914), Hippologist
- Siegfried Graf Lehndorff (1869–1956), Hippologist, head of Trakehner stud
- Hans von Lehndorff (1910–1987), surgeon and author
- Manfred Graf Ahasverus Wilhelm Heinrich Bernd von Lehndorff, (1883–1962)
- Heinrich Graf von Lehndorff-Steinort (1909–1944), resistance fighter
- Veruschka von Lehndorff (born 1939), artist
