= John I of Waldeck-Landau =

German count (1520s–1567)

John I, Count of Waldeck-Landau
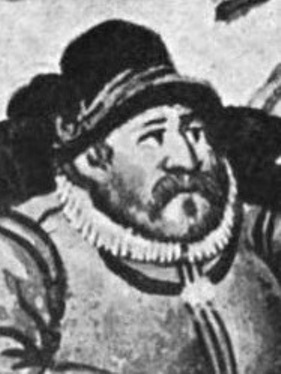
- Count John I of Waldeck-Landau.

Count of Waldeck-Landau
- Coat of arms
- Reign: 1539–1567
- Predecessor: Philip III of Waldeck-Eisenberg
- Successor: Philip VI of Waldeck-Landau
- Full name: John I Count of Waldeck-Landau
- Native name: Johann I. Graf von Waldeck-Landau
- Born: 1521 or 1522
- Died: 9 April 1567; Landau
- Buried: Mengeringhausen
- Noble family: House of Waldeck
- Spouse: Anne of Lippe
- Issue Detail: Philip VI; Francis III; Bernhard
- Father: Philip III of Waldeck-Eisenberg
- Mother: Anne of Cleves

Count John I 'the Pious' of Waldeck-Landau (1521 or 1522 – 9 April 1567), German: Johann I. 'der Fromme' Graf von Waldeck-Landau, was since 1539 Count of Waldeck-Landau. He was the founder of the younger cadet branch of Waldeck-Landau.

== Biography ==
Philip was born in 1521 or 1522 as the second son of Count Philip III of Waldeck-Eisenberg and his second wife Duchess Anne of Cleves. Since 1537 John studied with his elder brother Philip V in Marburg.

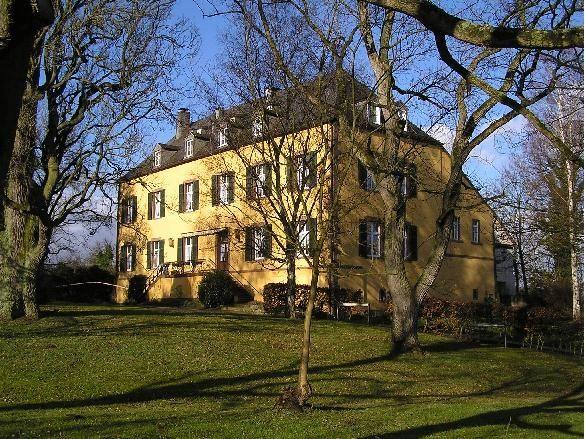
Landau Castle. Photo: Ralph Busch, 2007.

With the cooperation of Landgrave Philip I of Hesse, the division of the County of Waldeck was arranged by treaty on 22 November 1538. One part was awarded to the two sons of the first marriage, Otto V and Wolrad II, the other to the sons of the second marriage, Philip V, John I and Francis II. A year later, after the death of his father, John succeeded him in Landau.

Although by 1529 the Protestant faith was widespread in most parts of the County of Waldeck, the churches and some influential citizens still remained Catholic, especially in Korbach, where the Counts of Waldeck did not manage to eliminate the religious differences. In May 1543 they brought in the Protestant Reformer Adam Krafft, who completed the Reformation in the County of Waldeck.

The two leaders of the Schmalkaldic League, Elector John Frederick I of Saxony and Landgrave Philip I of Hesse, formed an army in the middle of 1546. The Counts of Waldeck responded to the landgrave's call for support. Emperor Charles V emerged victorious from the Schmalkaldic War on 24 April 1547 at the Battle of Mühlberg. Of the Counts of Waldeck, only Count Samuel, son of Count Philip IV of Waldeck-Wildungen, had participated; but the other Counts of Waldeck also had to come to Kassel to sign the reconciliation treaty, which the Emperor presented on 16 July 1547 to the surrendering landgrave. The subjects and servants of Hesse were also ordered to sign the treaty. John had already signed it, his relatives followed. But the Emperor did not accept the reconciliation in the case of the Counts of Waldeck. For him they were not subjects of Hesse, but Imperial Counts and therefore immediately subordinate to him. Therefore, he summoned them under threat of the imperial ban to the Diet of Augsburg in 1548, so that they would answer for their participation in the army of the Schmalkaldic League and reconcile with him. What on the one hand had the character of a humiliation for the counts, on the other hand weakened the landgraves of Hesse and their territorial claims to the County of Waldeck. Waldeck was thus explicitly immediate.

John travelled to Augsburg with his brother Philip V, who as a Catholic clergyman had been on the side of the Protestants, and his halfbrother Wolrad II, as well as with Samuel, who had not been summoned at all. Arriving in Augsburg on 14 April 1548, weeks passed by during which the Counts of Waldeck sought – and finally found – advocates. At the end of May, however, the Emperor declared that an apology was not enough for him. Philip and John had to pay him 5,000 guilders, Wolrad even 8,000, because he had turned against the Emperor in word and deed more than the other counts, so it was said. They were forced to waive substantial financial claims. On 22 June 1548 the Emperor drew up the pardon charter. On 12 August the Emperor also issued a letter of protection for Countess Dowager Anne and for Wolrad, Philip and John. However, the counts did not give up Protestantism.

At the Imperial Diet, the Emperor issued the Interim – an Imperial law – to bridge the time until a general church council, which would have to include the Protestants in the Catholic Church. There was fierce resistance because it subjected the Protestants to the authority of bishops and the Pope again. The Emperor withdrew it in 1552.

The weakening of Hesse as a result of the five-year imprisonment of Landgrave Philip I in the Netherlands and the high debts after the Schmalkaldic War caused the estates of the realm of Waldeck to turn away from Hesse. Confessionally the county was united, but administratively it was not. On 22 June 1549 the Reichskammergericht in Speyer decided that Hesse could not exempt Waldeck from its obligations towards the Emperor and the Empire and that the Counts of Waldeck, as immediate counts, had to pay the imperial taxes themselves. However, the collection of taxes from the estates of the realm was difficult and forced the long overdue improvement of the administration of the county.

In 1553, John I visited his uncle, Bishop Francis of Münster. His uncle asked him to mediate in a dispute between the Münster city council and the guilds. After this dispute had been resolved, Francis repealed the privileges he had granted to the Baptists after the Münster Rebellion. John I is mentioned in this decree.

The Counts of Waldeck had a tendency towards more independence after the Imperial and Religion Peace of Augsburg. To this end, the Imperial Estates had met in 1555. They agreed, among other things, that the respective territorial lord should determine the religion. After the Peace of Augsburg of 1555, John proposed to the other counts of Waldeck to hold a meeting with all ministers in the county to improve the Lutheran church. The counts were represented at the meeting by their councillors. Preachers from Lippe were also present; the goal was to draw up a uniform Church Order for both Lippe and Waldeck. The synod decided that visitors and superintendents should be appointed in each county. After the visitors had visited all churches, another synod was convened, where the results of the visitations were discussed and the church order was prepared. The church order was decided and was printed for the first time in 1557 in Marburg.

In 1561, Jobst Schaden, who was the governor of Volkmarsen, from the Electorate of Cologne, invaded John's part of Waldeck. John I requested the assistance of Landgrave Philip I of Hesse. Due to an inheritance dispute, he had a troubled relationship with his mother. Duke William of Jülich-Cleves-Berg and landgrave Philip I mediated and a compromise was reached in 1561. His mother would administer the district of Arolsen until her death; after her death, the district would fall back to Waldeck-Landau. Also in 1561, he added a new entrance gate and a chancellery office to Landau Castle. After Bernard VIII died, John I became the guardian of his children.

John died in Landau on 9 April 1567 and was buried in the church in Mengeringhausen. An iron plate and a stone epitaph mark his grave. He was succeeded by his sons Philip VI and Francis III.

== Marriage and issue ==
John married in Detmold on 1 October 1550 to Countess Anne of Lippe (? – Arolsen, 24 November 1590), daughter of Count Simon V of Lippe and Countess Magdalene of Mansfeld.

From the marriage of John and Anne the following children were born:

1. Philip VI (4 October 1551 – Darmstadt, 9 November 1579), succeeded his father in 1567.
2. Francis III (Cloppenburg Castle, 27 June 1553 – Landau Castle, 12 March 1597), succeeded his father in 1567. Married in Arolsen on 9 December 1582 to Countess Walpurgis of Plesse (15 June 1563 – Landau, 24 March 1602).
3. Anastasia (5 January 1555 – 19 April 1583), married in Kassel on 2 March 1579 to Count Frederick of Diepholz and Bronkhorst, Lord of Borculo (? – Lemförde, 21 September 1585).
4. Johannes (1557 – died young).
5. Margaret (1559 – 20 October 1580), married in Altenwildungen on 15 December 1578 to Count Günther of Waldeck-Wildungen (Altenwildungen, 29/30 June 1557 – Altenwildungen, 23 May 1585).
6. Bernhard (1561 – Iburg, 11 March 1591), was since 1586 Bishop of Osnabrück.
7. Agnes (ca. 1563 – Landau, 13 May 1576).

== Ancestors ==
Ancestors of Count John I of Waldeck-Landau
Great-great-grandparents	Henry VII of Waldeck-Waldeck (?–after 1442) ⚭ 1398; Margaret of Nassau-Wiesbaden-Idstein (?–after 1432)	Michael I of Wertheim (?–1441) ⚭ 1413; Sophie of Henneberg-Aschach (?–1441)	John of Solms-Braunfels (?–1457) ⚭ ca. 1429; Elisabeth of Cronberg (?–1438)	John IV of Salm (?–1476) ⚭ 1432; Elisabeth of Hanau-Münzenberg (?–1446)	Adolf II of Cleves (1373–1448) ⚭ 1406; Mary of Burgundy (1393–1463)	John of Burgundy-Nevers (1415–1491) ⚭ 1435; Jacqueline d'Ailly (?–1470)	Louis III of Hesse (1402–1458) ⚭ 1433; Anne of Saxony (1420–1462)	Philip of Katzenelnbogen (ca. 1402–1479) ⚭ 1422; Anne of Württemberg (1408–1471)
Great-grandparents	Wolrad I of Waldeck-Waldeck (1407–1475) ⚭ 1440; Barbara of Wertheim (?–?)		Cuno of Solms-Lich (?–1477) ⚭ 1457; Walpurgis of Dhaun (?–?)		John I of Cleves (1419–1481) ⚭ 1455; Elizabeth of Burgundy-Nevers (1439–1483)		Henry III of Hesse-Marburg (1440–1483) ⚭ 1458; Anne of Katzenelnbogen (1443–1494)	
Grandparents	Philip II of Waldeck-Eisenberg (1452/53–1524) ⚭ 1481; Catherine of Solms-Lich (?–1492)				John II of Cleves (1458–1521) ⚭ 1489; Matilda of Hesse-Marburg (1473–1505)			
Parents	Philip III of Waldeck-Eisenberg (1486–1539) ⚭ 1503; Anne of Cleves (1495–1567)							

== Literature ==
- Varnhagen, Johann Adolf Theodor Ludwig (1853). Grundlage der Waldeckischen Landes- und Regentengeschichte (in German). Vol. Zweiter Band. Arolsen: Verlag der Speyer'schen Buchhandlung.

== Sources ==
- Behr, Kamill (1854). Genealogie der in Europa regierenden Fürstenhäuser (in German). Leipzig: Verlag von Bernhard Tauchnitz.
- von Ehrenkrook, Hans Friedrich; Förster, Karl & Marchtaler, Kurt Erhard (1928). Ahnenreihen aus allen deutschen Gauen. Beilage zum Archiv für Sippenforschung und allen verwandten Gebieten (in German). Görlitz: Verlag für Sippenforschung und Wappenkunde C.A. Starke.
- Haarmann, Torsten (2014). Das Haus Waldeck und Pyrmont. Mehr als 900 Jahre Gesamtgeschichte mit Stammfolge. Deutsche Fürstenhäuser (in German). Vol. Heft 35. Werl: Börde-Verlag. ISBN 978-3-981-4458-2-4.
- Hoffmeister, Jacob Christoph Carl (1883). Historisch-genealogisches Handbuch über alle Grafen und Fürsten von Waldeck und Pyrmont seit 1228 (in German). Cassel: Verlag Gustav Klaunig.
- Huberty, Michel; Giraud, Alain & Magdelaine, F. & B. (1987). l'Allemagne Dynastique (in French). Vol. Tome V: Hohenzollern-Waldeck-Familles alliées A-B. Le Perreux-sur-Marne: Alain Giraud.
