= Anna of Katzenelnbogen (1443–1494) =

Katzenelnbogen noblewoman and Landgravine of Hesse

- Arms of Katzenelnogen.
- Born: 5 September 1443; Katzenelnbogen, Hessen-Nassau, Deutschland
- Died: 16 February 1494 (aged 50); Marburg, Hessen-Nassau, Deutschland
- Buried: St. Elizabeth's Church, Marburg, Germany
- Noble family: Katzenelnbogen (by birth); Hesse (by marriage)
- Spouse: Henry III, Landgrave of Upper Hesse
- Issue: Frederick; Ludwig III; Elisabeth of Hesse-Marburg; William III, Landgrave of Hesse; Mathilde of Hesse; Heinrich
- Father: Philipp I, Count of Katzenelnbogen
- Mother: Anna of Württemberg

Anna of Katzenelnbogen (5 September 1443 in Katzenelnbogen – 16 February 1494 in Marburg) was the daughter of Philipp I, Count of Katzenelnbogen (1402–1479), and his first wife Anna of Württemberg (1408–1471). She is notable for being the great-grandmother to Anne of Cleves, the fourth wife of King Henry VIII of England.

== Early life and family ==
Anna was born on 5 September 1443 into the Katzenelnbogen noble family, was the only daughter of Philipp I, Count of Katzenelnbogen, and his first wife Anna of Württemberg. daughter of Eberhard IV "the Younger" of Württemberg, and his wife Henriette, Countess of Montbéliard. Anna had two elder brothers. They were:

- Philipp the Younger (* 1427; † 27 February 1453), married in 1450 Ottilie of Nassau-Siegen, daughter of Henry II, Count of Nassau-Siegen. In 1453 they had a daughter Ottilie of Katzenelnbogen.
- Eberhard (* 1437; † 1456), canon of Cologne, was stabbed in Bruges (Flanders).

== Marriage and issue ==
Anna married Henry III, Landgrave of Upper Hesse in 1458. Henry would earn the nickname "the Rich" due to the territorial gains associated with the marriage, which also came with considerable financial gain, including the lucrative revenues from Rhine customs. Her husband inherited the possessions of the Katzenelnbogen family when the Katzenelnbogen male line died out after the death of her father Philipp in 1479. The County of Katzenelnbogen fell to the Landgraviate of Hesse, which was ruled at the time by her husband Henry III of Hesse in Marburg, after he had bought off the inheritance rights of Philipp's granddaughter Ottilie.

The couple had four sons. and two daughters. They were:

- Friedrich (died as a child)
- Louis III (November 1461 - July 2, 1478)
- William III (Wilhelm III, Landgraf von Hessen-Marburg) (1471–1500)., their only son to reach adulthood succeeded as In 1498, William ΙΙΙ married Elisabeth, the daughter of Philip, Elector Palatine. William ΙΙΙ left no legitimate heir and the title passed to his cousin, William II, Landgrave of Hesse, son of Louis II, Landgrave of Lower Hesse.
- Heinrich (born July 1474, died young)
- Elisabeth (1466–1523), who would marry in 1482 to John V, Count of Nassau-Siegen, and would become grandparents to William the Silent.
- Mathilde (1473–1505), would go on to marry in 1489 to John II, Duke of Cleves, and would become grandparents to Queen Anne of Cleves.

== Death and burial ==
Anna died on 16 February 1494 from unspecified causes aged 50 in Marburg. She was laid to rest in St. Elizabeth's Church where her husband had been buried at his own death almost eight years before.

== Ancestry ==
Ancestors of Anna of Katzenelnbogen (1443–1494)

8. Diether VIII, Count of Katzenelnbogen
4. Johann IV, Count of Katzenelnbogen
9. Elisabeth of Nassau-Wiesbaden
2. Philipp I, Count of Katzenelnbogen
10. Eberhard V Von Katzenelnbogen (1322 - abt. 1402)
5. Anne of Katzenelnbogen
11. Agnes Dietz (1324 - abt. 1399)
1. Anna of Katzenelnbogen
12. Eberhard III, Count of Württemberg
6. Eberhard IV "the Younger"
13. Antonia Visconti
3. Anna of Württemberg
14. Henry of Orbe
7. Henriette, Countess of Montbéliard
15. Marie de Chatillon-Blaigny

== Sources ==
- Boltanski, Ariane (2006). Les ducs de Nevers et l'État royal: genèse d'un compromis (ca 1550 - ca 1600) (in French). Librairie Droz S.A.
- Ward, A.W.; Prothero, G.W.; Leathes, Stanley, eds. (1934). The Cambridge Modern History. Vol. XIII. Cambridge University Press.
