= Matilda of Hesse =

Duchess of Cleves and Countess of La Marck from 1489 to 1505

Mathilde of Hesse
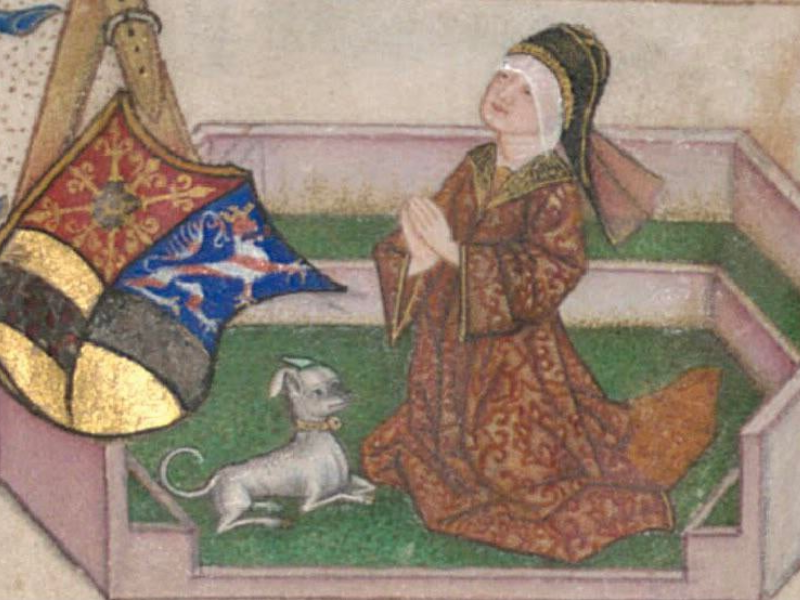
- Matilde of Hesse illustrated in her prayer book.
- Born: 4 July 1473; Blankenstein
- Died: 19 February 1505 (aged 31); Cologne
- Noble family: Hesse (by birth); La Marck (by marriage)
- Spouse: John II, Duke of Cleves (m. 1489)
- Issue: John III, Duke of Cleves; Anna of Cleves; Adolf of Cleves
- Father: Henry III, Landgrave of Upper Hesse
- Mother: Anna of Katzenelnbogen

Mathilde of Hesse (4 July 1473 in Blankenstein – 19 February 1505 in Cologne) was a Landrave princess from birth and became the Duchess of Cleves and Countess of La Marck through her marriage to John II, Duke of Cleves in 1489 until her death. She was the daughter of Henry III, Landgrave of Upper Hesse (1441–1483) and Anna of Katzenelnbogen (1443–1494). She is notable for being the paternal grandmother of Anne of Cleves, the fourth wife of King Henry VIII of England.

== Early life and family ==
Mathilde was born on 4 July 1473 into the Hesse noble family, was the younger daughter of Henry III, Landgrave of Upper Hesse and his wife, Anna of Katzenelnbogen the daughter of Philipp I, Count of Katzenelnbogen and his first wife, Anna of Württemberg. Her father earned an extreme amount of wealth and territories due to his marriage to Mathilde's mother Anna, and gained the nickname "the Rich". She became an heiress to the County of Katzenelnbogen after the death of her father in 1479. A dispute later developed around this inheritance, which was also called the "Katzenelnbogischen succession dispute". At the end, Mathilde's brother William benefited from the inheritance.

Mathilde also had five siblings. They were:

- Frederick (died young).
- Ludwig III (1460-1478). Never married and died without issue.
- Elisabeth of Hesse-Marburg (1466–1523). She married John V, Count of Nassau-Siegen and had six children.
- William III, Landgrave of Hesse (1471-1500). Married Elisabeth and died without heirs.
- Heinrich (died young).

== Marriage and issue ==
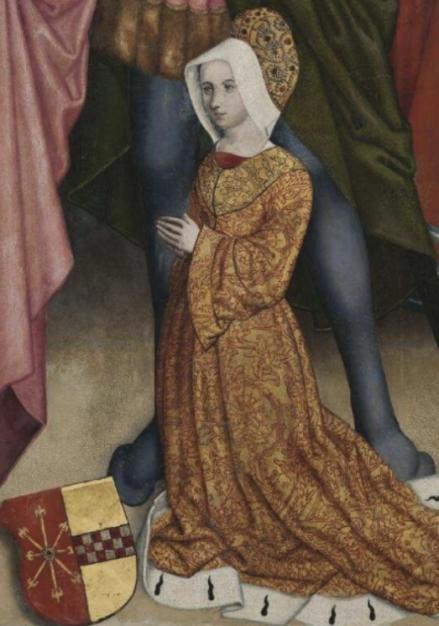
Matilda's daughter, Anna.

Mathilde's parents, like their older sister Elisabeth, tried to secure the Katzenelnbogen legacy with an early marriage policy. In the summer of 1481, she was engaged to John of Cleves, and the marriage was scheduled for 1485. However, it took place on 3 November 1489, after Pope Innocent VIII had awarded Duke John the Golden Rose on 15 April 1489 . This is remarkable in light of the fact that John, with his alleged 63 illegitimate children, had the dubious reputation of being a "child maker". From then on, John called himself "Johann von Kleve, Count of La Marck and Katzenelnbogen". She married on 3 November 1489 in Soest to John II, Duke of Cleves. He was son of John I, Duke of Cleves and Elizabeth of Nevers. The marriage produced three known children:

- John (1490–1539), succeeded as Duke of Cleves and Count of the Marck
- Anna (1495–1567), married in 1518 with count Philip III of Waldeck-Eisenberg
- Adolf (1498–1525), appointed by his father's cousin Philip of Cleves, Lord of Ravenstein and Wijnendale, as his successor, but died before Philip did in 1528

== Death and burial ==
Mathilde died on 19 February 1505 from unknown causes at the young age of 31 in Cologne. She was laid to rest in Stiftskirche Kleve where her husband would be buried much later.

== Prayer book origins ==
The Munich State Library (Cod. Germ. 84) contains the "Prayer Book of Sybille von Kleve", dated 1526. In his research, the art historian Eberhard Schenk zu Schweinsberg, based on an identical prayer book (on loan from the Cologne canon Valentin Engelhart von Geltersheym in the research library) proves that both prayer books come from a Cologne workshop. He states that only Mathilde could have been the first owner of the prayer book and that after her death, it was passed down to her granddaughter Sibylle of Cleves as a wedding present.

== Ancestry ==
Ancestors of Matilda of Hesse

8. Hermann II, Landgrave of Hesse
4. Louis I, Landgrave of Hesse
9. Margaret of Hohenzollern-Nuremberg
2. Henry III, Landgrave of Upper Hesse
10. Frederick I, Elector of Saxony
5. Anna of Saxony, Landgravine of Hesse
11. Catherine of Brunswick-Lüneburg
1. Mathilde of Hesse
12. Johann IV, Count of Katzenelnbogen
6. Philipp I, Count of Katzenelnbogen
13. Anna of Katzelnbogen
3. Anna of Katzenelnbogen
14. Eberhard IV, Count of Württemberg
7. Anna of Württemberg
15. Henriette, Countess of Montbéliard

== Sources ==
- Boltanski, Ariane (2006). Les ducs de Nevers et l'État royal: genèse d'un compromis (ca 1550 - ca 1600) (in French). Librairie Droz S.A.
- Ward, A.W.; Prothero, G.W.; Leathes, Stanley, eds. (1934). The Cambridge Modern History. Vol. XIII. Cambridge University Press.
