= Anna of Cleves (1495–1567) =

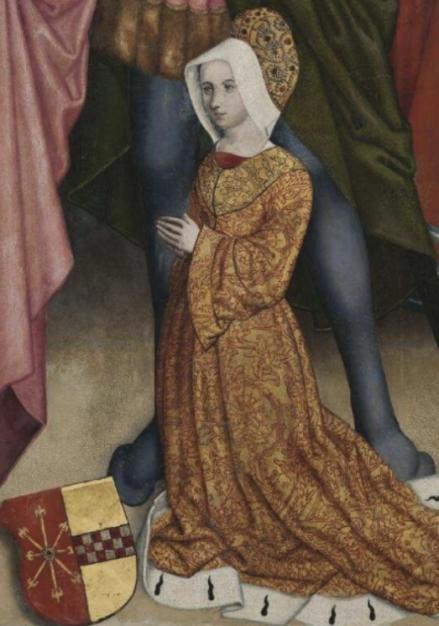
- Born: 1495
- Died: 1567 (aged 71–72)
- Noble family: La Marck (by birth); Waldeck (by marriage)
- Spouse: Philip III, Count of Waldeck
- Issue: Philip V; John I; Catherine; Francis
- Father: John II, Duke of Cleves
- Mother: Matilda of Hesse

Anna of Cleves (1495-1567) Was a German noblewoman of the House of La Marck, and from 1524 Countess of Waldeck-Eisenberg by marriage to Philip III, Count of Waldeck. Not to be confused with her niece, Anne of Cleves, who was Queen of England in 1540.

She is remembered for her disputed marriage to Philip III, which led to her temporary imprisonment by her brother.

== Early life and family ==
Anna was born in 1495 into the ducal House of La Marck, rulers of the Duchy of Cleves to John II, Duke of Cleves and his wife, Matilda of Hesse. Her father, John was the son of John I, Duke of Cleves and Elizabeth of Nevers. Her mother, Matilda came from the powerful house of Hesse and was the daughter of Henry III, Landgrave of Upper Hesse and Anna of Katzenelnbogen. Anna of Cleves inherited connections to some of the wealthiest noble families in Germany through her mother.

She had two legitimate siblings, John and Adolf. Her father was known for allegedly having 63 illegitimate children. Earning him the nickname "The Babymaker".

Anna's niece, Anne of Cleves, is believed to have been named after her.

== Marriage and issue ==
She fell in love with or became politically attached to Philip III, Count of Waldeck. Her brother, John III, Duke of Cleves opposed to the match and had Anna imprisoned from 1517-1519 to stop the pair from marrying. Despite the odds, Anna secretly married him in 1519, and had four children:

- Philip V (1519/20-1584)
- John I, Count of Waldeck-Landau (1521/22-1567)
- Catherine (1523/24-1583)
- Francis (1526-1574)

She was widowed in 1539 when Philip died.

== Death ==
She died of unknown causes in 1567. Having outlived her husband for 28 years.
