= Philip VI =

Philip VI may refer to:

- Philip VI of France (1293–1350)
- Philip VI, Count of Waldeck (1551–1579)
- Philip VI of Navarre, Philip IV of Spain (1621-1665)
- Felipe VI of Spain (born 1968)
- Philip VI of Macedon (died 146 BC)
