= Walram IV =

Walram IV or Waleran IV may refer to:

- Waleran IV, Duke of Limburg (died 1279)
- Walram IV, Count of Nassau-Idstein (1354–1393)
