= Louis I of Hesse =

Louis I of Hesse may refer to:

- Louis I, Landgrave of Hesse (1402–1458)
- Louis I, Grand Duke of Hesse (1753–1830)
