= Battenbergturm =

Coordinates: 51°46′32″N 6°28′12″E

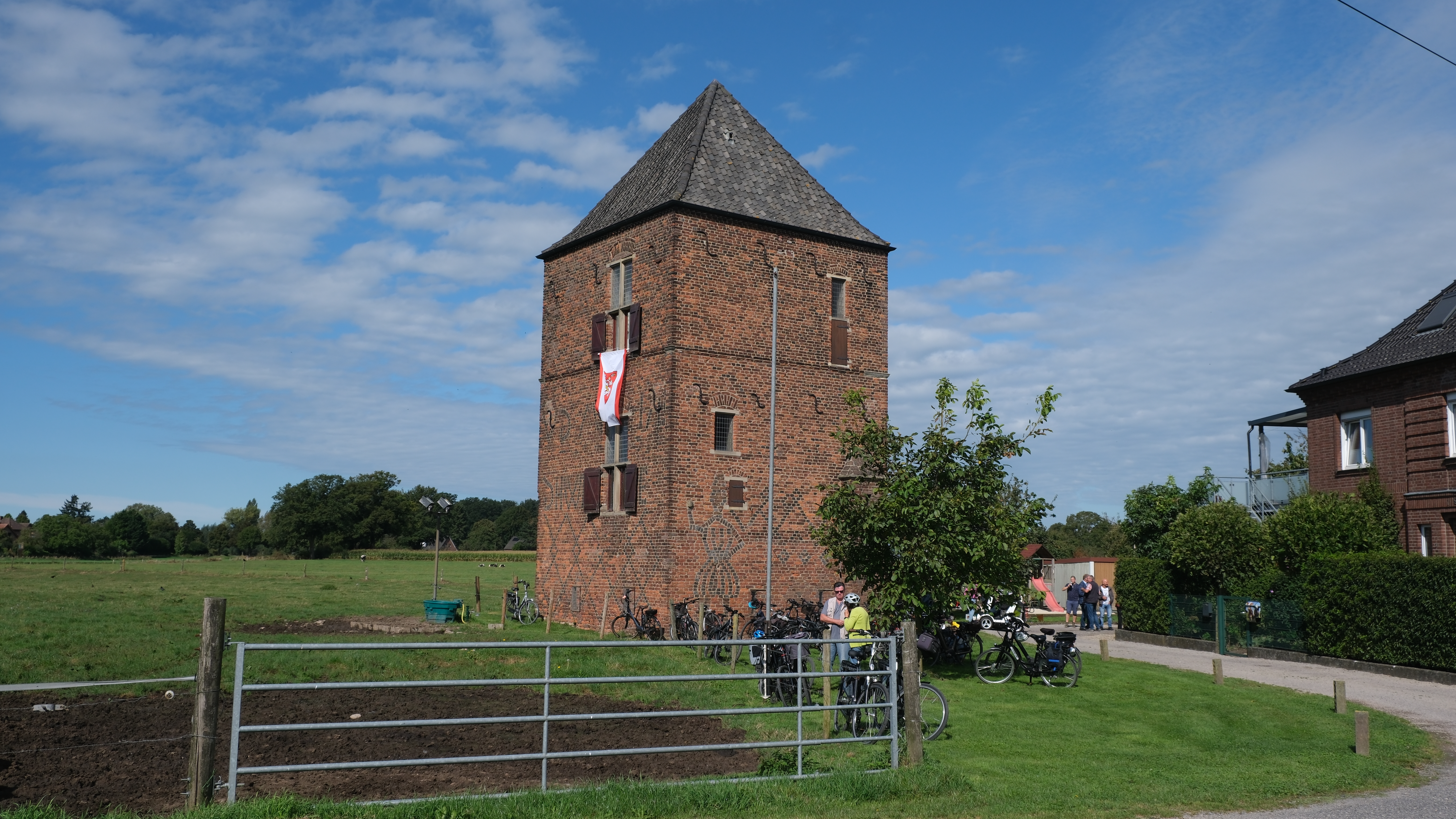
Battenbergturm in Haldern

The Battenberg Tower is a late medieval residential tower in Haldern, a part of Rees in the district of Kleve, North Rhine-Westphalia, Germany. It is situated 750 metres north-east of the centre of Haldern, right next to a farm, and is a rare example of a lightly fortified residential tower in the Rhineland.

== History ==
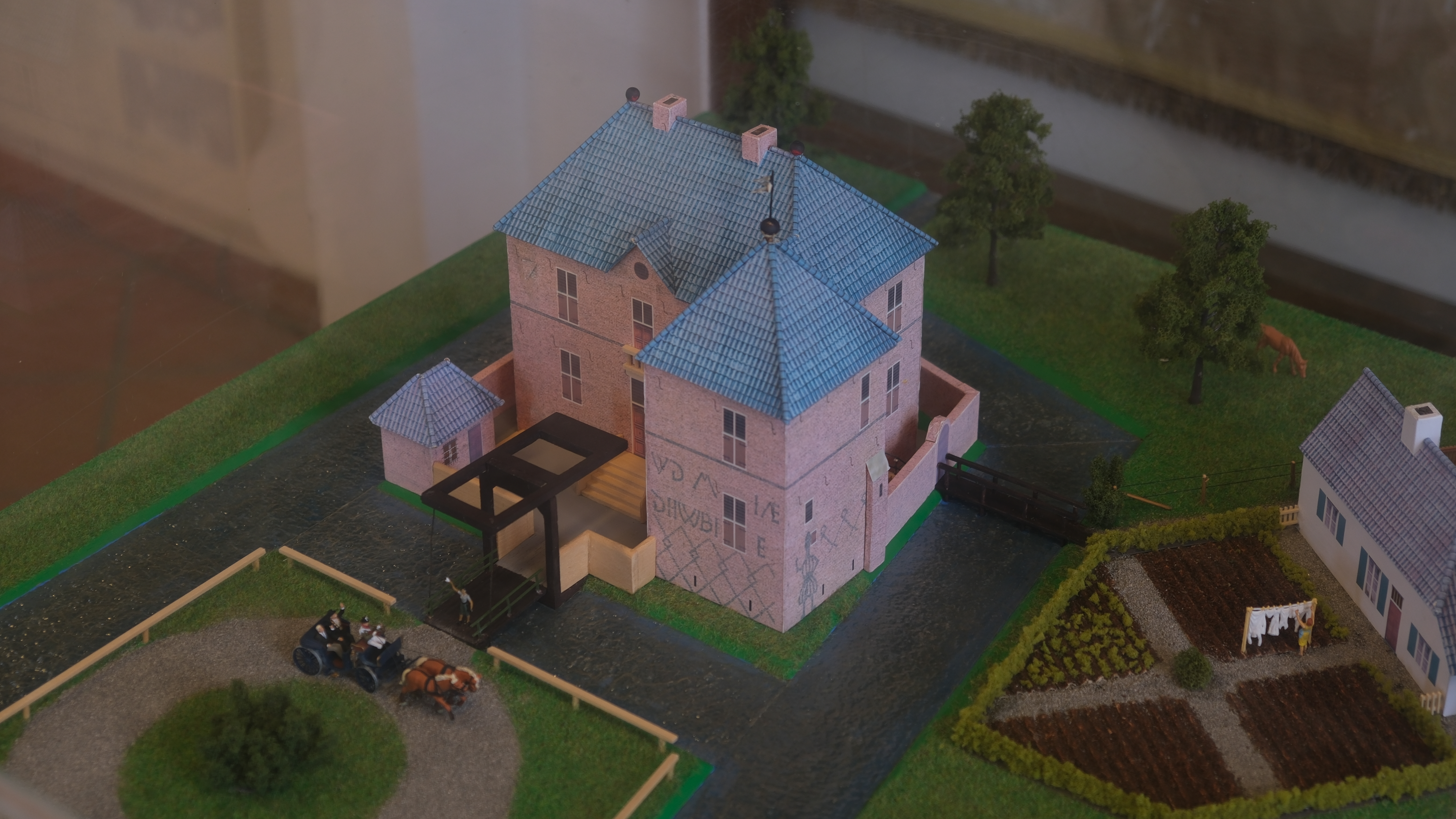
A model in the permanent exhibition showing what the tower and main building would have looked like had the latter been built.

The Buschkampshof, next to which the Battenberg Tower stands, was first mentioned in 1377. In 1494, Duke John II of Cleves bestowed the farmstead upon the squire Amelongh von Escharden. Amelongh rose through the ranks, becoming a court messenger in 1494 and a judge in Rees and Aspel in 1498. He is believed to be the builder of the tower, which was erected at the beginning of the 16th century. The tower likely owes its name to this builder: Batenberg means ‘the messenger’s tower’ (from the Old German word ‘Berg’ for ‘mountain’).

Originally, the complex was intended to include at least one further building, as suggested by the moat, the remains of which are still visible, and traces of high walls on the north and west sides. However, these buildings were never erected.

In 1639, the estate was still referred to as a knight's residence, but by 1674 this was no longer the case. In 1676, and definitively in 1681, the Buschkampshof came into the possession of the von Wittenhorst-Sonsfeld family, who also laid out an avenue from their park, which belonged to Sonsfeld Castle, leading towards the Battenberg Tower. After the tower had been used as a storehouse and stable in later centuries, it had fallen into decay when it was leased for 50 years by the Haldern Local History Society in 1984 and renovated by 1993. Since then, the tower has been the headquarters of the Society and can be visited on the first Sunday of every month during the summer.

== Building ==
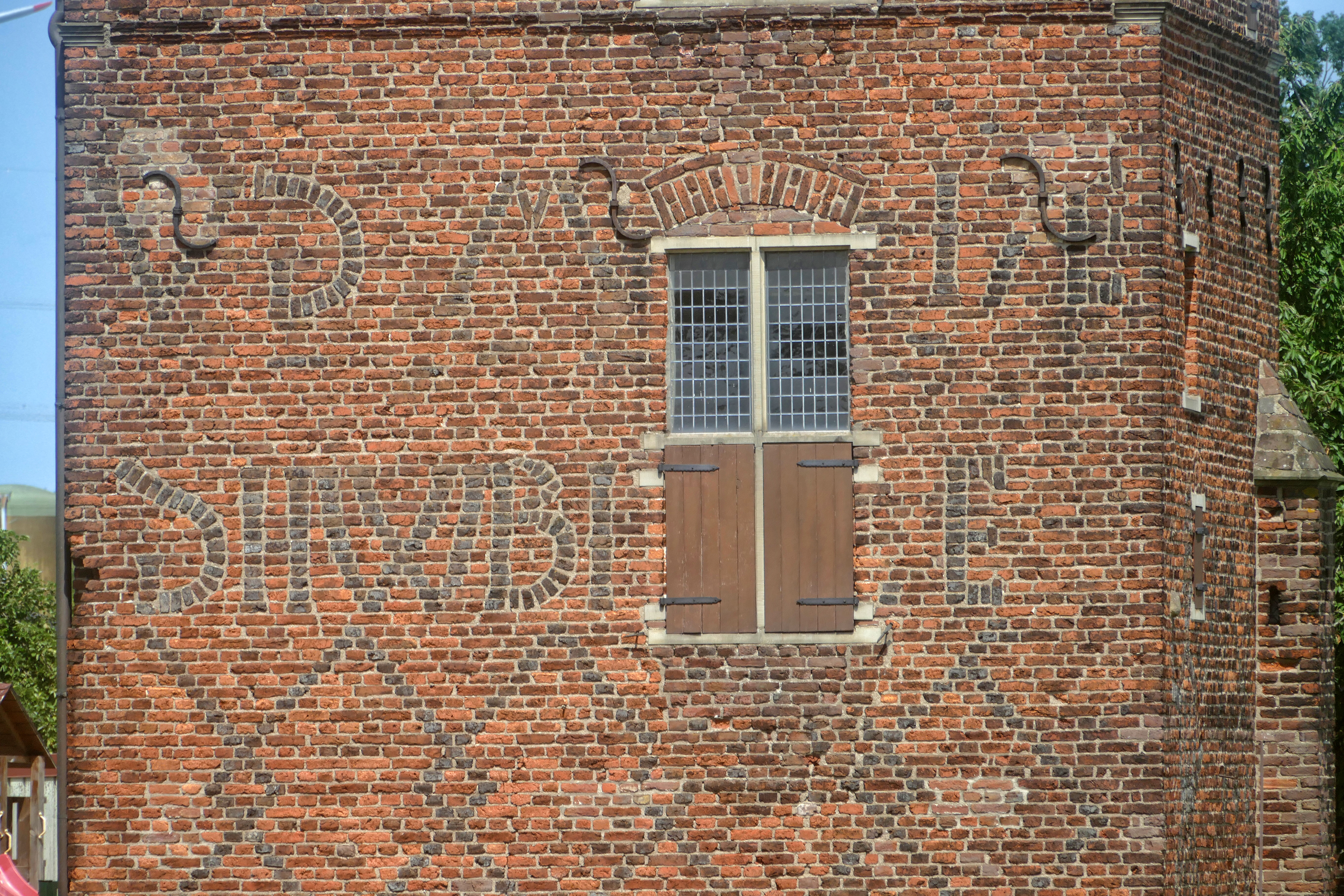
Inscription on the south side

The tower has a floor plan measuring 7.24 metres by 7.07 metres. It comprises a low basement level and two storeys above. The tower is approximately 15 metres high in total. It is built of brick, with walls 86 centimetres thick. Set into the eastern outer wall is a figure made of glazed bricks, which is thought to depict the builder.

Both residential floors could be heated by fireplaces; on the ground floor, there is a toilet bay attached to the building which leads directly into the former moat. There are embrasures in the basement. However, the thin walls and the large mullioned windows suggest that the tower was intended to serve only to a limited extent as a defensive tower.

The entrance is on the north side. Remnants of walls on the north and west sides indicate that there were plans to build an extension, which would likely have served a defensive purpose.

On the south side of the tower, the inscription V D M I AE – D H W B I E (motto: Verbum Domini Manet In Aeternum (Latin) – The Lord's Word remains for ever (German)) is set in glazed bricks. This suggests that the tower was built during or after the Reformation period.

At intervals of 25 to 30 metres, there is a rectangular moat surrounding the tower. An avenue led from the former Sonsfeld Park to Battenberg Tower. This avenue is still partially preserved.

== Historical review ==
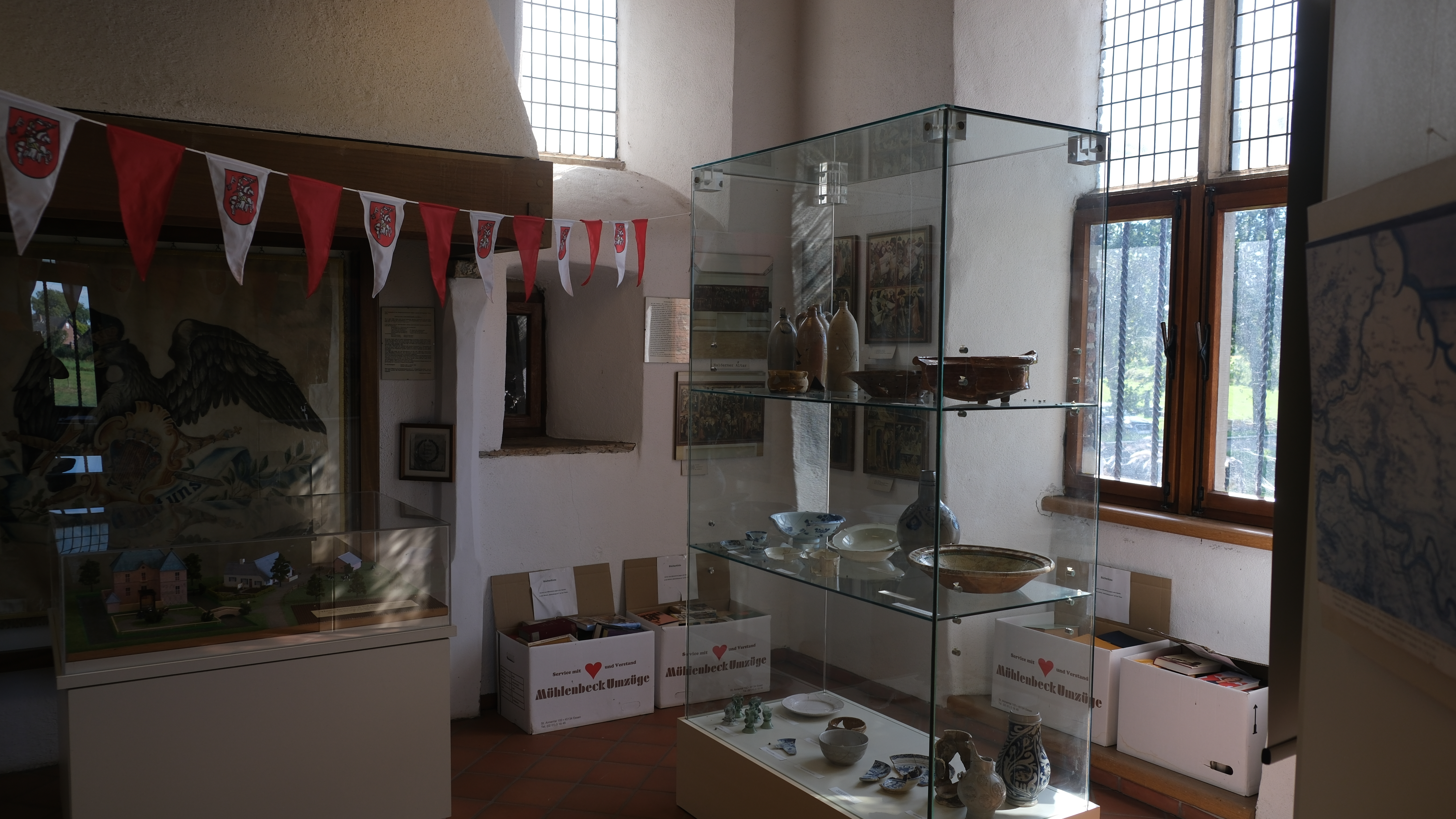
Exhibition in the tower

There are no records of the builder dating from after 1504. It is not known why construction of the complex was not continued. Signs of use on the fireplace and the toilet indicate that the tower was inhabited for only a short time. As the building was subsequently used for agricultural purposes, no major alterations were made, meaning that the tower remains in its original condition today.

The Battenberg Tower, a stone version of the traditional Lower Rhineland ‘Berf’, stands alone in the Rhineland with no other examples of its kind. It represents an attempt in the late Middle Ages to combine residential comfort with defensive capabilities, though it fails to fulfil these functions satisfactorily. The Haldern Local History Society uses the tower: the ground floor houses a permanent exhibition on the history of the village. Cultural events take place on the upper floor, and the attic houses archive and work rooms.
