= Anna of Cleves =

Anna of Cleves may refer to:

- Anna of Cleves (1495–1567), daughter of John II of Cleves, married to Philip III of Waldeck-Eisenberg
- Anne of Cleves (1515–1557), daughter of John III of Cleves, married to Henry VIII of England
- Anna of Cleves (1552–1632), daughter of William V of Cleves, married to Philip Louis, Count Palatine of Neuburg
- Anna, Duchess of Cleves (1576–1625), daughter of Albert Frederick of Prussia, married to John Sigismund, Elector of Brandenburg

== See also ==
- Ann Cleeves, English novelist
