= Philipp I of Katzenelnbogen =

Count of Katzenelnbogen

Philipp I
- Count of Katzenelnbogen
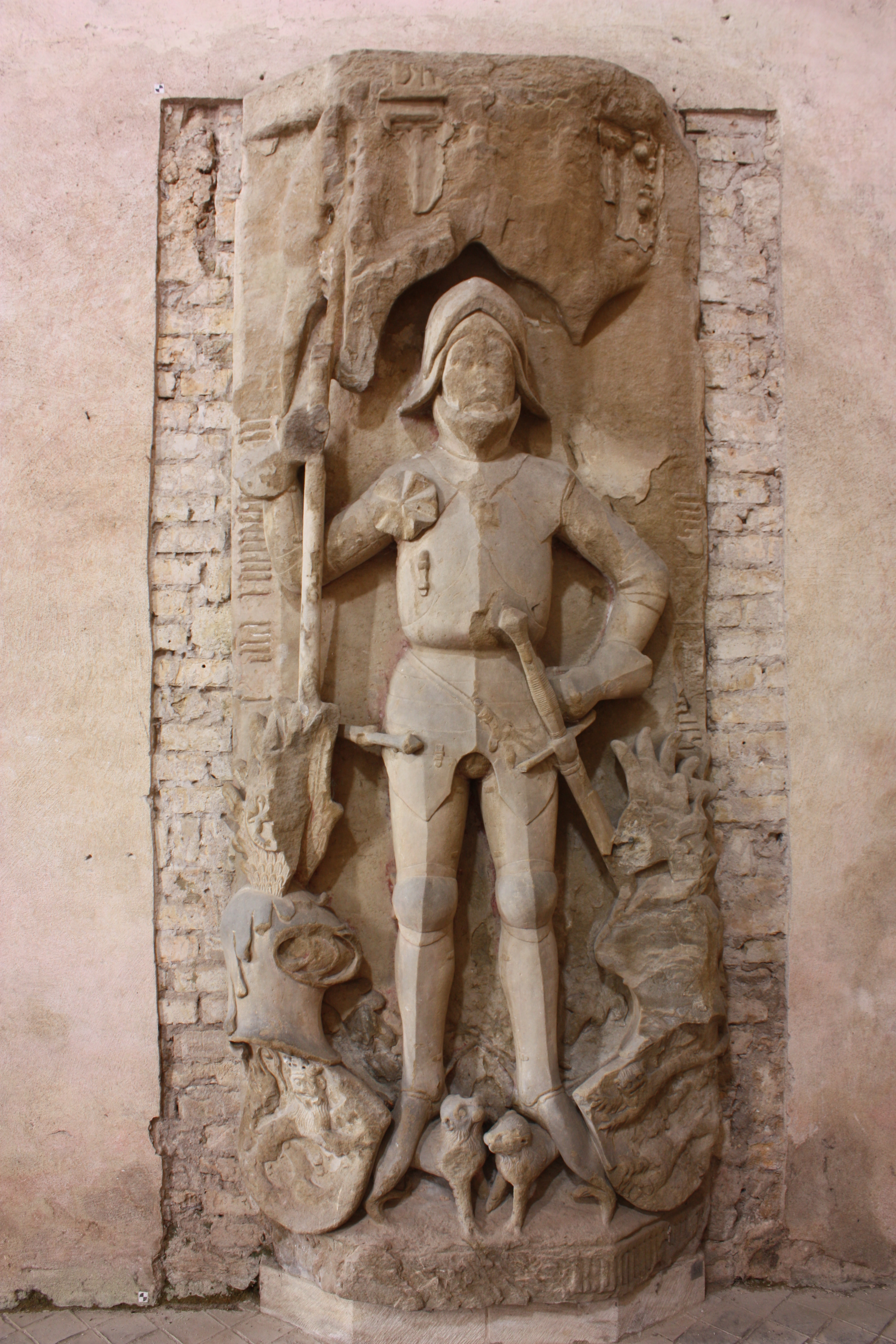
- Stone memorial of Philipp I, Count of Katzenelnbogen.
- Born: 1402
- Died: 1479 (aged 76–77)
- Spouse: Anna of Württemberg; Anne of Nassau-Siegen
- Issue: Philipp the Younger, Count of Katzenelnbogen; Eberhard of Katzenelnbogen; Anna of Katzenelnbogen
- Father: Johann IV, Count of Katzenelnbogen
- Mother: Anne of Katzenelnbogen

Philipp I of Katzenelnbogen (1402–1479), also known "Philipp the Elder", was Count of Katzenelnbogen from 1444 to 1479 and was the last male descendant of the Counts of Katzenelnbogen (his two sons died before him). His parents were Johann IV, Count of Katzenelnbogen (younger line), and Anne of Katzenelnbogen (older line), who merged the two lines of the family back together in 1402.

== Marriage and issue ==
Philip married on 24 February 1422 in Darmstadt Anna of Württemberg (1408–1471), daughter of Eberhard IV "the Younger" of Württemberg. In 1456, he obtained from the Pope a divorce a mensa et thoro. In 1474, Philip married Anne of Nassau-Siegen.

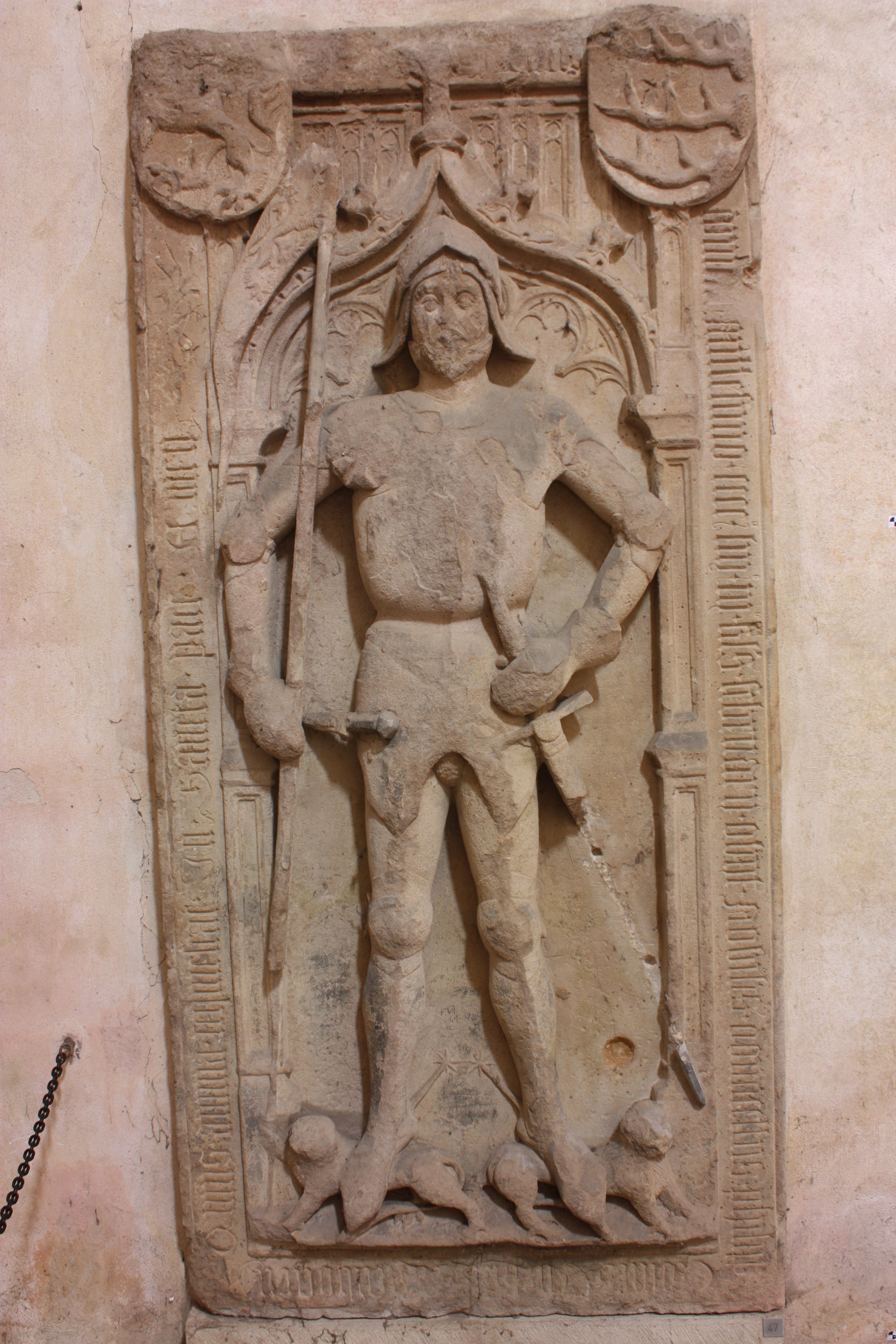
Philipp the younger (* 1427; † 27 February 1453), elder son of Philipp I, Count of Katzenelnbogen.

Philipp had three children with his first wife:

- Philipp the Younger (* 1427; † 27 February 1453), married in 1450 Ottilie of Nassau-Siegen, daughter of Henry II, Count of Nassau-Siegen. In 1453, they had a daughter Ottilie of Katzenelnbogen.
- Eberhard (* 1437; † 1456), canon of Cologne, was stabbed in Bruges (Flanders).
- Anna (* 5 September 1443; † 16 February 1494), married in 1458 margrave Henry III of Hesse (15 October 1441 — 13 January 1483). In 1471, they had a son William III, who was the last male descendant of this line of the House of Hesse.

== Legacy ==
- In 1444 Philipp initiated a major renovation of the collegiate church of Sankt Goar.
- In 1449 he bought off the rights on St. Goar held by abbot Johann of the Abbey at Prüm.
- In 1470 he handed Upper Katzenelnbogen and its seat Darmstadt to his son-in-law Henry III, Landgrave of Upper Hesse.

Philipp's sons Eberhard and Philipp the younger died before his death, so when Philipp died in 1479, the Katzenelnbogen family died out in the male line. The County of Katzenelnbogen fell to the Landgraviate of Hesse, which was ruled at the time by Philipp's son-in-law Henry III of Hesse in Marburg, Henry having bought off the inheritance rights of Philipp's granddaughter Ottilie.

== Ancestry ==
Ancestors of Philipp I of Katzenelnbogen

16. Gerhard of Katzenelnbogen
8. Johann II of Katzenelnbogen
17. Margaret of Mark
4. Diether VIII, Count of Katzenelnbogen
18. John I of Isenburg-Limburg
9. Elizabeth of Isenburg-Limburg
19. Elizabeth of Geroldseck
2. Johann IV, Count of Katzenelnbogen
20. Gerlach I, Count of Nassau
10. Adolph I, Count of Nassau-Wiesbaden-Idstein
21. Agnes of Hesse
5. Elizabeth of Nassau-Wiesbaden-Idstein
22. Frederick IV, Burgrave of Nuremberg
11. Margarete of Hohenzollern
23. Margaret of Görz-Tyrol
1. Philipp I, Count of Katzenelnbogen
24. Diether V of Katzenelnbogen
12. Wilhelm I, Count of Katzenelnbogen
25. Margaret of Jülich
6. Eberhard V of Katzenelnbogen
26. Otto I, Count of Waldeck
13. Adelheid of Waldeck
27. Sophia of Hesse
3. Anna of Katzenelnbogen
28. Gottfried I of Dietz
14. Gerhard VI of Dietz
29. Agnes of Isenburg-Arenfel
7. Agnes of Dietz
30. Emicho I, Count of Nassau-Hadamar
15. Jutta of Nassau-Hadamar
31. Anna of Hohenzollern
