= Gerlach II =

Gerlach II may refer to:

- Gerlach II of Isenburg-Covern, Count of Isenburg-Covern 1158–1217
- Gerlach II of Isenburg-Arnfels, Count of Isenburg-Arnfels 1333–1379
- Gerlach II, Count of Nassau-Wiesbaden (1333–1386), ruled 1370–1386
