= Wilhelm I of Katzenelnbogen =

Rhenish noble

- Born: 1270/71
- Died: 18 November 1331
- Spouse: Imgard (Jutte) of Isenberg-Büdingen; Adelheid of Waldeck
- Father: Diether V of Katzenelnbogen
- Mother: Margaret of Jülich

Wilhelm I, Count of Katzenelnbogen (1270/71 - 18 November 1331) was a Count from the elder line of the House of Katzenelnbogen. He ruled Lower Katzenelnbogen from 1276 to 1331. Wilhelm was the son of Diether V of Katzenelnbogen (died 1276) and Margaret of Jülich (died 1292), daughter of William IV of Jülich.

In 1301, Wilhelm allied himself with the four Rhenish Electors who were demanding excessive customs duties for shipping on the Rhine river. King Albert I sought to eliminate these duties which led to a war in which the King, aided by the Imperial Cities, defeated the Rhenish Electors. Having allied himself to the losing side of this war, Wilhelm lost part of his territory as a consequence.

In 1319, the Archbishop of Trier granted Wilhelm the right to build Reichenberg Castle, to quell feuds in the area and also to fortify the core area of Katzenelnbogen with its possessions on the Rhine. The castle was still under construction at the time of Wilhelm's death. Construction was completed during the reign of Wilhelm's son Wilhelm II although the latter was less enthusiastic about the project.

Prior to his death, Wilhelm established a Majorat, under which the eldest son was the sole successor and the county could not be further subdivided as had been done by his grandfather, Diether IV (died 1245), who divided Katzenelnbogen into Lower and Upper counties so that his two sons could each inherit. After Wilhelm's death in 1331, the Lower county passed to his son Wilhelm II who died in 1385 with no issue and then to Wilhelm II's brother Eberhard V. When Eberhard V died in 1402, the Lower county passed to his only daughter Anna, who was married to Johann IV from the younger line, which resulted in the reunification of the two counties.

Wilhelm died on 18 November 1331 and was buried at Eberbach Abbey, which had been established as the burial place for the Counts of Katzenelnbogen by his uncle Eberhard I. Wilhelm's tomb was located in 1612/14 in the monastery church in front of the altar of St. John. The burial slab was later mounted on the wall during a reconstruction. Portions of the burial slab are now on display in the Abbey Museum.

== Family ==
Wilhelm was married twice.: In 1284 he married Imgard (Jutte) of Isenberg-Büdingen (died 1309), daughter of Louis I. They had two children

- Margarethe (died 1336)
- Heilwig (died 1333), married 1305 Bruno IV of Wied-Braunsberg-Isenburg (died 23 August 1325)

Wilhelm then married 23 January 1314 to Adelheid of Waldeck (1290 - 1 September 1329, buried in the tomb at the collegiate church of St. Goar), daughter of Otto I, Count of Waldeck. Their children were:

- John (1314 - c.1330), engaged 1325 to Uda, daughter of Gerlach V of Isenburg-Limburg
- Jutte (1315 - 1378), abbess in the monastery of Kaufungen
- Anna (1316 - 1350), who married first in 1329 to John II of Isenburg-Limburg (died 1336) and second in 1338 to Philip VI of Falkenstein
- Elizabeth (1317 - 1368), married 1330 to Walram, Count of Sponheim-Kreuznach (c.1305-1380)
- Agnes (1318 - before 1338), engaged to Philip VI of Falkenstein
- Wilhelm II (1319 - before 23 October 1385, buried Eberbach Abbey), married 1355 Elizabeth of Hanau (c.1330 - after 1384), daughter of Ulrich III, Lord of Hanau. Wilhelm II had no issue and was succeeded by his brother Eberhard V.
- Diether (1320 - 3 October 1350), 1342-1350 abbot of Prüm, buried with his mother at St. Goar Abbey
- Eberhard V (1322 - 9 December 1402), married before 12 November 1367 to Agnes of Dietz (c.1324 - 18 November 1399), daughter of Gerhard VI of Dietz. Both buried at Eberbach Abbey. Their daughter Anna married Johann IV of the younger line of Katzenelnbogen, which resulted in the reunification of the two counties.

== Ancestry ==
Ancestors of Wilhelm I of Katzenelnbogen

8. Diether III of Katzenelnbogen
4. Diether IV of Katzenelnbogen
2. Diether V of Katzenelnbogen
10. Eberhard of Dornberg
5. Hildegunde of Dornberg
1. Wilhelm I, Count of Katzenelnbogen
12. William III of Jülich
6. William IV of Jülich
13. Mathilde of Limburg
3. Margaret of Jülich
14. Gerard III of Guelders
7. Richardis of Guelders
15. Margaret of Brabant

== See also ==
- County of Katzenelnbogen
