= Philip III of Waldeck =

Philip III, Count of Waldeck
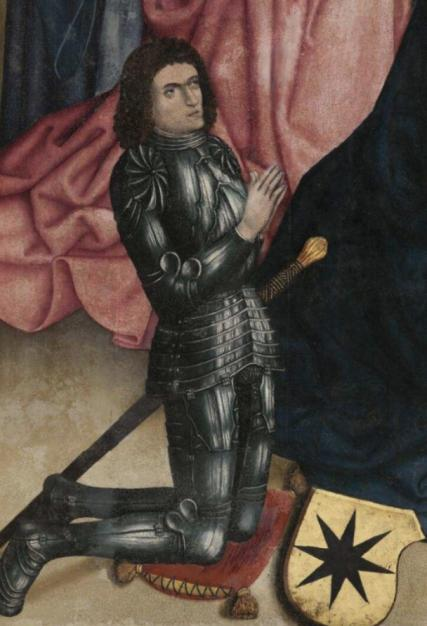
- Born: 9 December 1486; Waldeck Castle in Waldeck
- Died: 20 June 1539 (aged 52); Bad Arolsen
- Noble family: House of Waldeck
- Spouses: Adelheid of Hoya; Anne of Cleves
- Father: Philip II, Count of Waldeck
- Mother: Catherine of Solms-Lich

Philip III, Count of Waldeck (9 December 1486, at Waldeck Castle in Waldeck – 20 June 1539, in Bad Arolsen), was from 1524 to 1539 Count of Waldeck-Eisenberg.

== Life ==
He was a son of Count Philip II of Waldeck-Eisenberg and his first wife, Catherine of Solms-Lich, and succeeded his father in 1524 as Count of Waldeck-Eisenberg.

Around 1520 he built a residential wing of the later Goldhausen Castle in Korbach. Further expansion took place between 1563 and 1565, under his son Wolrad II.

In 1525, soon after he took office, he issued an order to introduce the Reformation in 1525 in Waldeck. Philip III and his nephew Count Philip IV of Waldeck-Wildungen appointed the Lutheran reformer Johann Hefentreger as pastor of the town of Waldeck. Johann gave his inaugural sermon on 17 June 1526. On 26 June 1526, he led a Lutheran church service, thereby officially introducing the Reformation in the county, four months before Landgrave Philip I introduced the Reformation in neighbouring Hesse. In 1529, the first Lutheran sermon was given in the St. Kilian Church in Korbach; he is portrait on the altar as its donor. Philip could not, however, push through the Reformation in Korbach.

Between 1526 and 1530, Philip acquired the secularized former Aroldessen monastery of the Hospital Brothers of St. Anthony in Bad Arolsen and had it rebuilt to a Royal Palace. He employed Johann von Wolmeringhausen as his Hofmeister and, after 1530, Johann's son Hermann von Wolmeringhausen.

Philip III died on 20 June 1539. After his death, Waldeck-Eisenberg was divided. His older son Wolrad II received a smaller Waldeck-Eisenberg; his younger son John received Waldeck-Landau.

== Marriages and issue ==
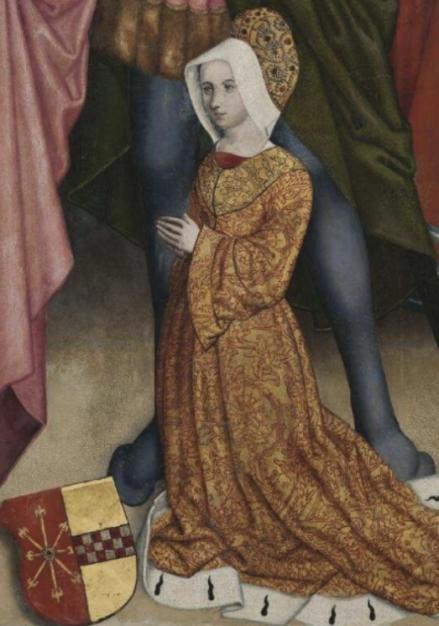
Philip's second wife, Anne.

In 1503, Philip married his first wife, Adelheid (d. 1515), a daughter of Count Otto IV of Hoya. From this marriage, Philip had four children:

- Otto (1504–1541)
- Elizabeth (1506–1562), married in 1525 Jean de Melun, Viscount of Ghent
- Wolrad II, founder of the so-called "middle Waldeck-Eisenberg line"
- Erika (1511–1560), 1526, married Eberhard of Mark, Duke of Arenberg, then secondly, in 1532, Count Dietrich V of Manderscheid-Virneburg.

In 1519, he married his second wife. She was Anna of Cleves (1495–1567), the only daughter of the Duke John II of Cleves and Matilda of Hesse-Marburg. Her brother had held her imprisoned from 1517 to 1519 to prevent the marriage. From this marriage, Philip had four more children:

- Philip V (born: 1519 or 1520; died: 1584), who joined the clergy
- John I (born: 1521 or 1522; died: 1567), founder of the "newer Waldeck-Landau line", which became extinct in 1597
- Catherine (born: 1523 or 1524–1583), married in 1550 with Count Bernhard VIII of Lippe
- Francis (1526–1574), married in 1563 with Maria Gogreve (died: 1580)

Philip III of Waldeck House of Waldeck Born: 9 December 1486 Died: 20 June 1539
Preceded by Philip II	Count of Waldeck-Eisenberg; 1524-1539	Succeeded by Wolrad II as Count of Waldeck-Eisenberg
Preceded by Philip II	Count of Waldeck-Eisenberg; 1524-1539	Succeeded by John I as Count of Waldeck-Landau
