= Rupert, Count of Nassau-Sonnenberg =

- Born: c. 1340
- Died: 4 September 1390
- Buried: Kirchheimbolanden
- Noble family: House of Nassau
- Spouse: Anna of Nassau-Hadamar
- Father: Gerlach I, Count of Nassau
- Mother: Irmgard of Hohenlohe

Rupert, Count of Nassau-Sonnenberg (c. 1340 – 4 September 1390), nicknamed the Bellicose, was a son of Gerlach I, Count of Nassau and his second wife, Irmgard of Hohenlohe.

== Life ==
As a younger son, Rupert was originally destined for a career in the clergy. Gerlach I abdicated in 1344, in favour of his sons, except he kept Sonnenberg Castle, where he lived. This castle was to be inherited by Kraft, Rupert's eldest brother. However, Kraft fell in battle while fighting on the French side in the Battle of Poitiers in 1356. It was then decided that Rupert would inherit Sonnenberg.

Rupert's half-brother from his father's first marriage ruled their father's possessions jointly until 1355, and then divided it:

- Adolph I inherited Nassau-Wiesbaden-Idstein (this line died out in the male line in 1605)
- John I inherited Nassau-Weilburg (this line died out in the male line in 1912)
- Rupert later inherited Nassau-Sonnenberg.

From 1355, Rupert was bailiff at Amöneburg Castle for his half-brother Gerlach, who was Archbishop of Mainz.

In 1361, Gerlach I died and Rupert inherited Nassau-Sonnenberg. Gerlach's widow Irmengard retired to Liebenau monastery, near Worms, where she became a Dominican nun.

In 1367, Rupert pledged some of his territory to his half-brother Adolph I, who immediately pledged it to back to Rupert and Anna (Ruper's wife) and Irmengard (Rupert's mother and Adolph's step-mother). The reasons for this remarkable maneuver are unclear.

In 1369, Rupert started a feud against John I of Nassau-Siegen, about some fief John I held from Hesse. Rupert claimed these fiefs, and joined the Star Covenant, an alliance of knights against Landgrave Henry II of Hesse.

In 1370, his half-brother Adolph I died. In 1371, his mother, Irmengard, died, as did his half-brothers John I and Gerlach.

From 1372 to 1374, Rupert fought another feud against John I of Nassau-Siegen. He managed to keep his Sonnenberg Castle intact, whereas the town of Nassau was so badly damaged during the fighting that it was uninhabitable for a while. Rupert forced John to hand over the town of Hadamar to Anna. They divided the territory.

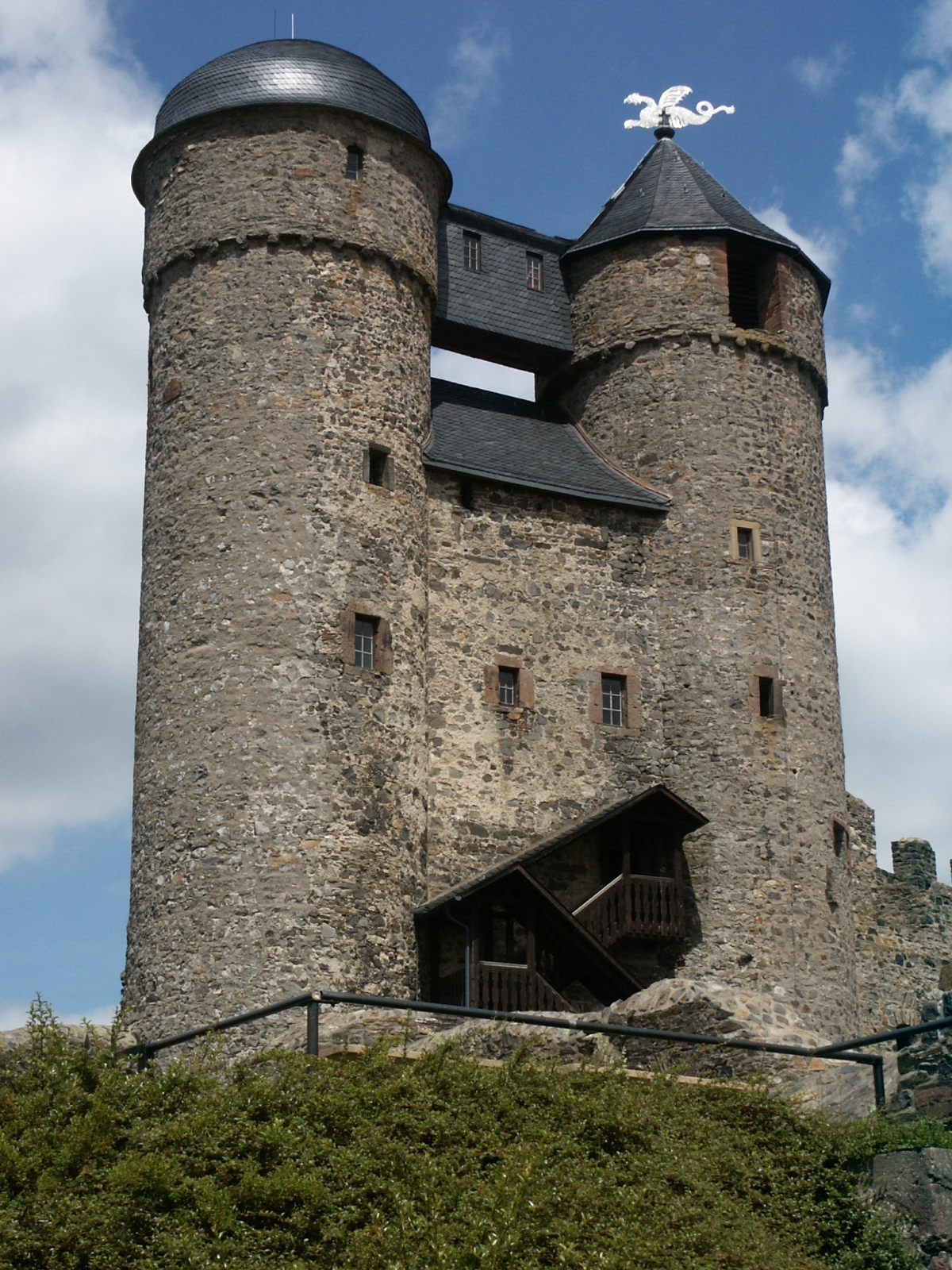
Twin towers of Greifenstein Castle

In 1381, King Wenceslaus appointed Rupert governor of the Wetterau. This triggered a second feud against John I of Nassau-Siegen, which lasted until 1382. In 1382, Rupert and the Counts of Solms-Burgsolms expanded Greifenstein Castle and added the characteristic twin towers. Also in 1382, yet another feud against John I of Nassau-Siegen broke out, which lasted until 1385.

After the feud he fought in the Hattstein War on the side of the cities in the Rhine/Wetterau region, against the high nobility in the area.

Rupert died in 1390 and was buried in Kirchheimbolanden. As he had no children, Nassau-Sonnenberg was inherited by Philipp I of Nassau-Weilburg.

== Marriage ==
In 1362, Rupert married Anna (d. 1404), a daughter of John of Nassau-Hadamar and Elisabeth of Waldeck. The marriage remained childless. After Rupert's death, Anna married Count Diether VIII of Katzenelnbogen (d. 1402).

== See also ==
- House of Nassau
