= Louis II of Lower Hesse =

Louis II
- Landgrave of Lower Hesse
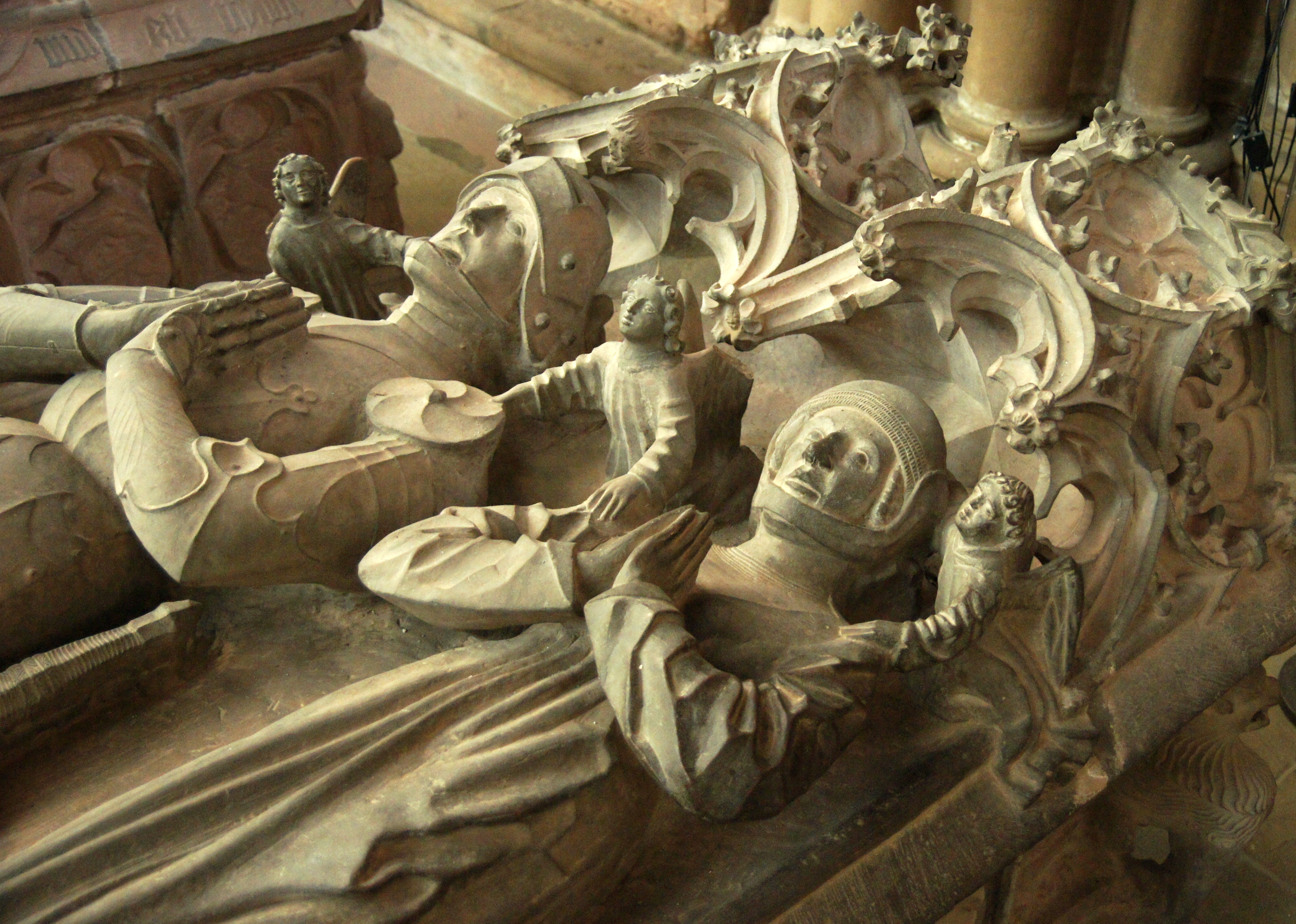
- Stone effigies of Louis II, and his wife Mechthild of Württemberg-Urach.
- Born: 7 September 1438
- Died: 8 November 1471 (aged 33)
- Spouse: Mechthild of Württemberg-Urach (also known as Matilda)
- Issue: Anna; Elisabeth; William I, Landgrave of Lower Hesse; William II, Landgrave of Hesse
- House: House of Hesse
- Father: Louis I, Landgrave of Hesse
- Mother: Anna of Saxony

Louis II of Hesse (German: Ludwig) (7 September 1438 – 8 November 1471), called Louis the Frank, was the Landgrave of Lower Hesse from 1458 - 1471.

He was the son of Louis I, Landgrave of Hesse and Anna of Saxony. He married Mechthild, daughter of Ludwig I, Count of Württemberg-Urach on 12 January 1454, and also known as Matilda. Their children were:

- Anna [1455-1459]
- Elisabeth (died young)
- William I, Landgrave of Hesse (1466–1515)
- William II, Landgrave of Hesse (1469–1509)

He also had seven (known) illegitimate children by his mistress, Margarethe von Holzheim (born about 1443 - died after 1515):

- Anna of Hesse (born about 1460, married Heinz Missener, 23 May 1484)
- Margarethe of Hesse (born about 1460, died 1524, married Heinrich Furster, mayor of Marburg, 5 February 1486)
- Johannes of Hesse (born about 1460, murdered 11 March 1531, married Gertrude ______)
- Wilhelm of Hesse (born about 1470, died 1550 in Melsungen)
- Luckel Lambrechts (born before 1471), a nun at the convent of Ahnaberg in Kassel
- Ernst of Natega, a canon in Hildesheim
- Friedrich of Hesse

The Landgraviate of Hesse had been divided by his father Louis I between Louis II and his brother Henry III into Hesse-Kassel (Lower Hesse) and Hesse-Marburg (Upper Hesse). The brothers fought about the exact demarcation of the realm until May 1470.

Louis II of Lower Hesse House of Hesse Born: 7 September 1438 Died: 8 November 1471
Preceded by Louis I	Landgrave of Lower Hesse; 1458–1471	Succeeded by William I
