= Gerlach II of Nassau-Wiesbaden =

Count of Nassau-Wiesbaden-Idstein (1370-1386)

Gerlach II, Count of Nassau-Wiesbaden
- Born: 1333
- Died: 1386 (aged 52–53)
- Noble family: House of Nassau
- Spouse: Agnes of Veldenz
- Father: Adolph I, Count of Nassau-Wiesbaden-Idstein
- Mother: Margaret of Nuremberg

Gerlach II, Count of Nassau-Wiesbaden (1333–1386) was the eldest son of Adolph I, Count of Nassau-Wiesbaden-Idstein and his wife Margaret of Nuremberg. When his father died in 1370, he inherited Nassau-Wiesbaden.

He married Agnes, a daughter of Henry II of Veldenz. The marriage remained childless. After his death, his younger brother, Walram IV, inherited Wiesbaden.

Gerlach II of Nassau-Wiesbaden House of Nassau Born: 1333 Died: 1386
Preceded by Adolph I	Count of Nassau-Wiesbaden; 1370–1386	Succeeded by Walram IV
