= Johann IV of Katzenelnbogen =

Count of Katzenelnbogen

Johann IV, Count of Katzenelnbogen
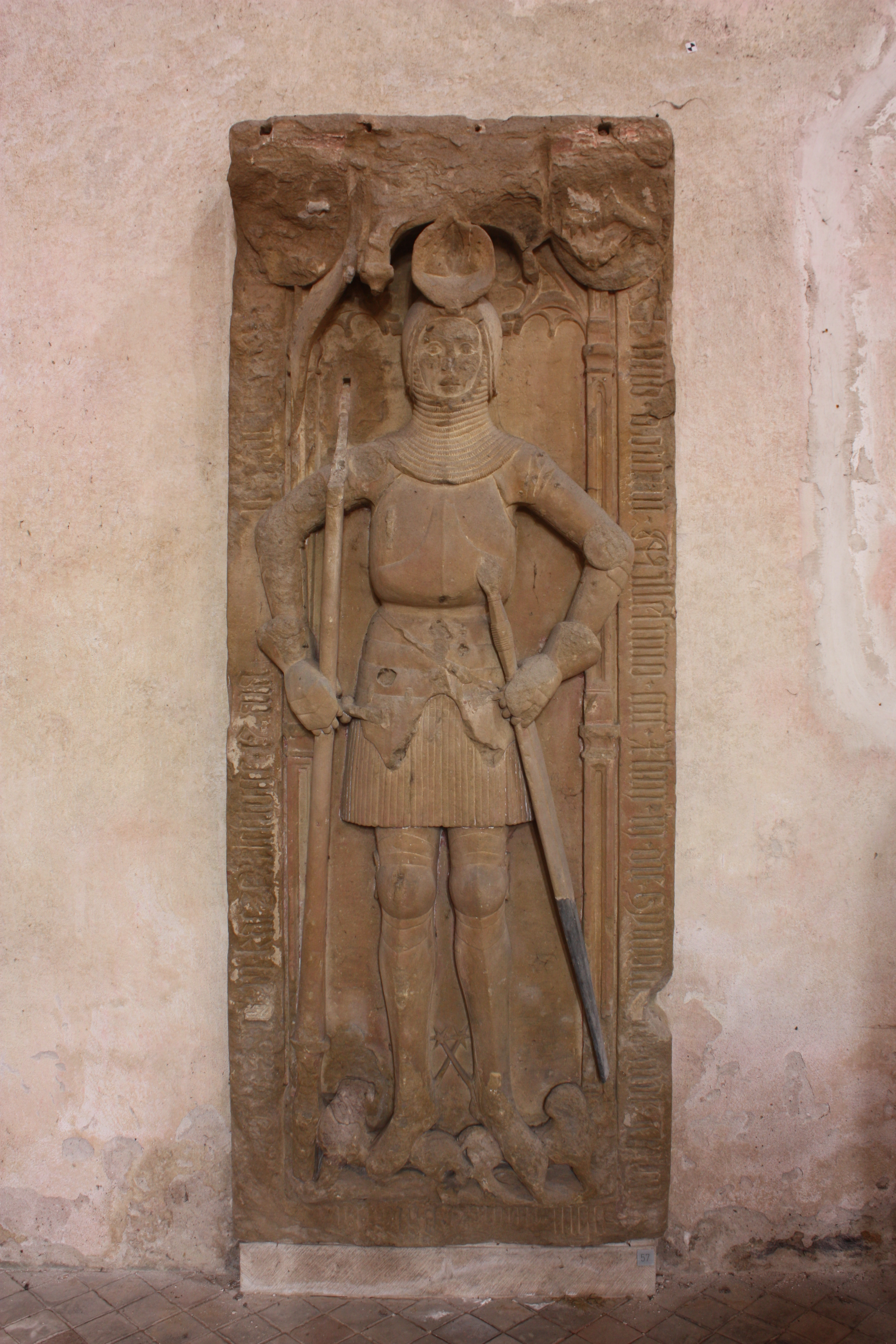
- Effigy of Johann IV, Count of Katzenelnbogen.
- Born: c.1363 Katzenelnbogen
- Died: 27 October 1444; Rheinfels Castle
- Noble family: House of Katzenelnbogen
- Spouse: Anna of Katzelnbogen
- Issue: Philipp I, Count of Katzenelnbogen
- Father: Diether VIII, Count of Katzenelnbogen
- Mother: Elisabeth of Nassau-Wiesbaden

Johann IV, Count of Katzenelnbogen (c.1363 - 27 October 1444) was one of the last members of the younger line of the House of Katzenelnbogen. He ruled the reunited County of Katzenelnbogen.

His father was Diether VIII, a count of Katzenelnbogen from the younger line of the House of Katzenelnbogen, and ruled mainly in Upper Katzenelnbogen. Johann's mother was Elisabeth, a daughter of Adolph I of Nassau-Wiesbaden (1307–1370).

In 1383, Johann IV married Anna of Katzenelnbogen, a distant cousin from the older line of Katzenelnbogen, and they had at least one son: Philipp I (1402–1479). Philipp I was the last male member of the House of Katzenelnbogen. He had two sons: Philipp II (1427–1453) and Eberhard (d. 1456), however, they both predeceased him. After Philipp I's death, his daughter Anna inherited the County, including Dornberg Castle, and so it fell to her husband, Henry III, Landgrave of Upper Hesse.

Johann was important in the history of Riesling. In 1435, Klaus Kleinfisch, an administrator of Johann, bought a new white grape variety from a vineyard in Rüsselsheim for 22 shillings. In this invoice, the name Riesling is mentioned for the first time in a document.

Johann died 27 October 1444 at Rheinfels Castle. His body was later transferred to Eberbach Abbey, which had been the family's burial site since Eberhard I of Katzenelnbogen.

== Ancestry ==
Ancestors of Johann IV of Katzenelnbogen

8. Gerhard of Katzenelnbogen
4. Johann II of Katzenelnbogen
9. Margaret of Mark
2. Diether VIII, Count of Katzenelnbogen
10. John I of Isenburg-Limburg
5. Elizabeth of Isenburg-Limburg
11. Elizabeth of Geroldseck
1. Johann IV, Count of Katzenelnbogen
12. Gerlach I, Count of Nassau
6. Adolph I, Count of Nassau-Wiesbaden-Idstein
13. Agnes of Hesse
3. Elisabeth of Nassau-Wiesbaden-Idstein
14. Frederick IV, Burgrave of Nuremberg
7. Margarete of Hohenzollern
15. Margaret of Görz-Tyrol
