= Philip VI of Waldeck =

Philip VI, Count of Waldeck
- Born: 4 October 1551
- Died: 9 November 1579 (aged 28); Darmstadt
- Buried: City Church in Darmstadt.
- Noble family: House of Waldeck
- Father: John I, Count of Waldeck-Landau
- Mother: Anna of Lippe

Philip VI, Count of Waldeck (4 October 1551 – 9 November 1579 in Darmstadt) was a canon in Strasbourg and also the ruling Count of Waldeck-Landau.

== Life ==
He was the eldest son of Count John I of Waldeck-Landau and his wife, Anna of Lippe.

He studied at the University of Marburg together with his younger brother Francis III. He completed his studies in 1569. In 1567, his uncle Philip V had waived a position as canon in Strasbourg in his favour.

His father died in 1567, and as the eldest son, he inherited Waldeck-Landau. He resided in Arolsen.

Philip VI died in 1579 in Darmstadt and was buried in the city church there. His mother ordered a stone to be placed over his grave. As he had no children, he was succeeded as Count by his younger brother Francis III.
