= Anna of Saxony, Landgravine of Hesse =

Landgravine of Hesse (1420–1462)

Anna of Saxony
- Tomb of Anna in Stadtkirche St. Johannes, Spangenberg.
- Born: 5 June 1420
- Died: 17 September 1462 (aged 42); Spangenberg
- Burial: Stadtkirche St. Johannes, Spangenberg
- Spouse: Louis I, Landgrave of Hesse
- Issue: Louis II, Landgrave of Lower Hesse; Henry III, Landgrave of Upper Hesse; Hermann IV of Hesse
- Father: Frederick I, Elector of Saxony
- Mother: Catherine of Brunswick-Lüneburg

Anna of Saxony (5 June 1420 – 17 September 1462, Spangenberg) was a princess of Saxony and by marriage landgravine of Hesse.

== Life ==
Anna was the eldest daughter of the elector Frederick I of Saxony (1370–1428) from his marriage to Catherine (1395–1442), daughter of Duke Henry I "the Mild" of Brunswick-Lüneburg.

Anna, with a dowry of 19,000 Rhenish gold florins, married on 8 September 1433 in Kassel Landgrave Louis I of Hesse. Their engagement had been announced on the occasion of the Inheritance Treaty between the two houses in 1431 in Rotenburg an der Fulda. Through this marriage, Louis increased his territory considerably. He received the Saxon properties of Eschwege and Sontra from Anna's brother Frederick II of Saxony. Frederick II also renounced his rights to Wanfried. Upon the marriage, Louis paid an additional 6,000 Gulden to secure full rights over Santra, Eschwege, and Wanfried. That ensured that they permanently returned to Hessian possession after a follow-up summit at Rotenburg in 1434.

== Issue ==
From her marriage to Louis, Anna had the following children:

1. Louis II (1438–1471), Landgrave of Hesse, married in 1454 Countess Mechthild of Württemberg (1438-1495)
2. Henry III (1440–1483), Landgrave of Hesse-Marburg, married Countess Anna of Katzenelnbogen (1443-1494)
3. Hermann (1449–1508), Archbishop of Cologne (from 1480-1508)
4. Elisabeth (1453–1489), known as the Beautiful, married in 1464 Count John III of Nassau-Weilburg (1441-1480)
5. Frederick (1458–1463)
