= County of Katzenelnbogen =

Immediate state of the Holy Roman Empire

Coordinates: 50°16′N 7°58′E

County of Katzenelnbogen Grafschaft Katzenelnbogen
- 1095–1479
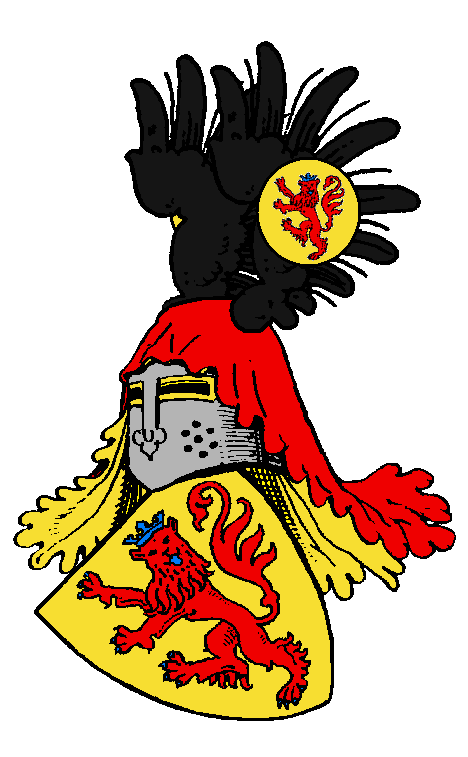
- Coat of arms

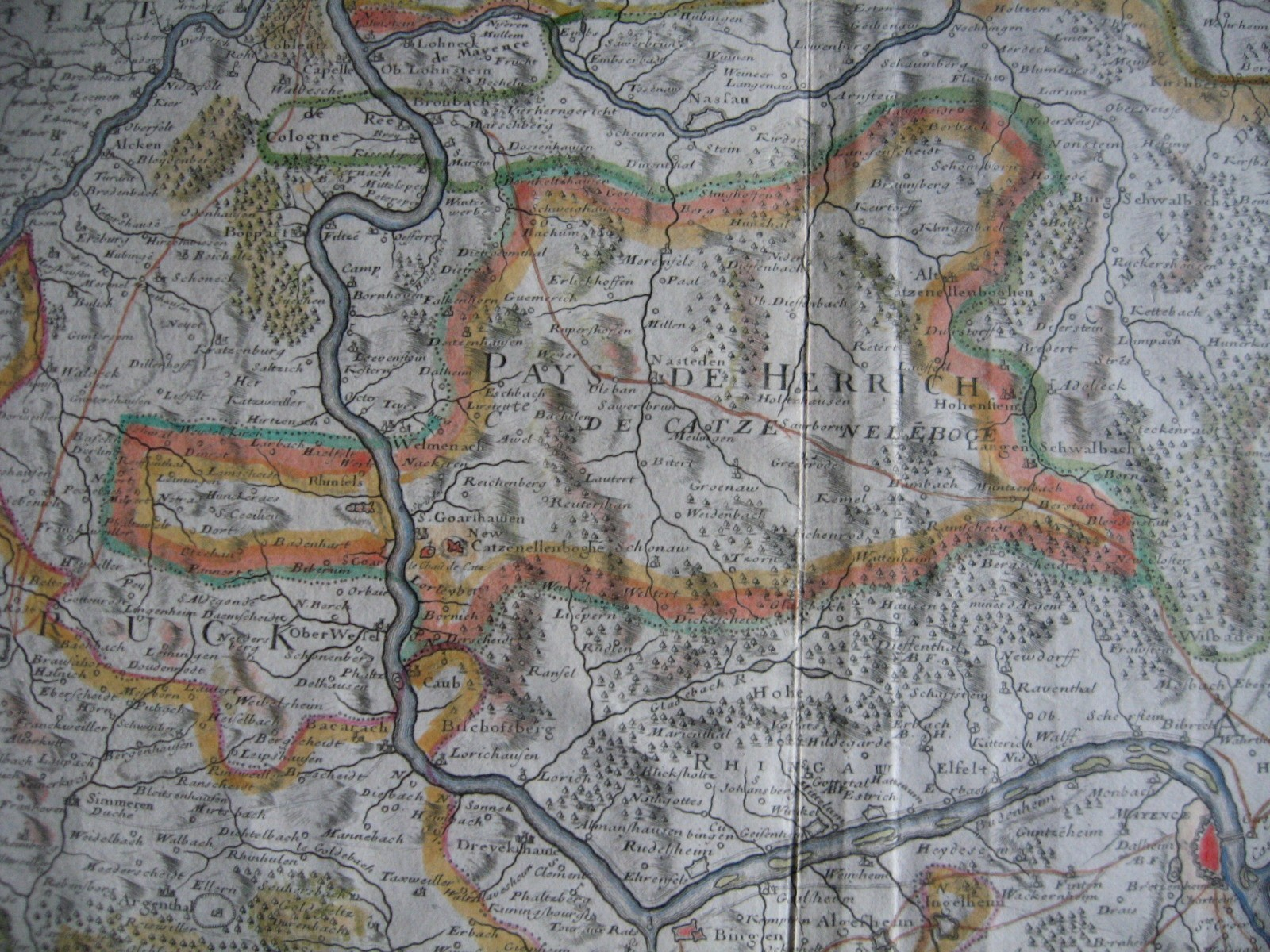
- The County of Katzenelnbogen shown on an early 18th-century map
- Status: County
- Capital: Katzenelnbogen
- Religion: Roman Catholicism
- Count
  - 1095 (first): Dieter I
  - 1444–79 (last): Philip I
- Historical era: Middle Ages
  - First mentioned: 1095
  - County: 1138
  - Comital line extinct, to Hesse-Marburg: 1479
Preceded by	Succeeded by
Rhenish Franconia	Landgraviate of Hesse

The County of Katzenelnbogen was an immediate state of the Holy Roman Empire. It existed between 1095 and 1479, when it was inherited by the Landgraves of Hesse.

The estate comprised two separate territories. The main parts were the original Untergrafschaft ('lower county') with its capital at Katzenelnbogen in the Middle Rhine area and the Obergrafschaft ('upper county') south of the Main River around Darmstadt, predecessor of the Landgraviate of Hesse-Darmstadt.

== History ==
An ancient tribe known as the Chatti Melibokus may have stayed on a high hill in the Bergstraße region of Hesse (the part that lies south), in Germany.

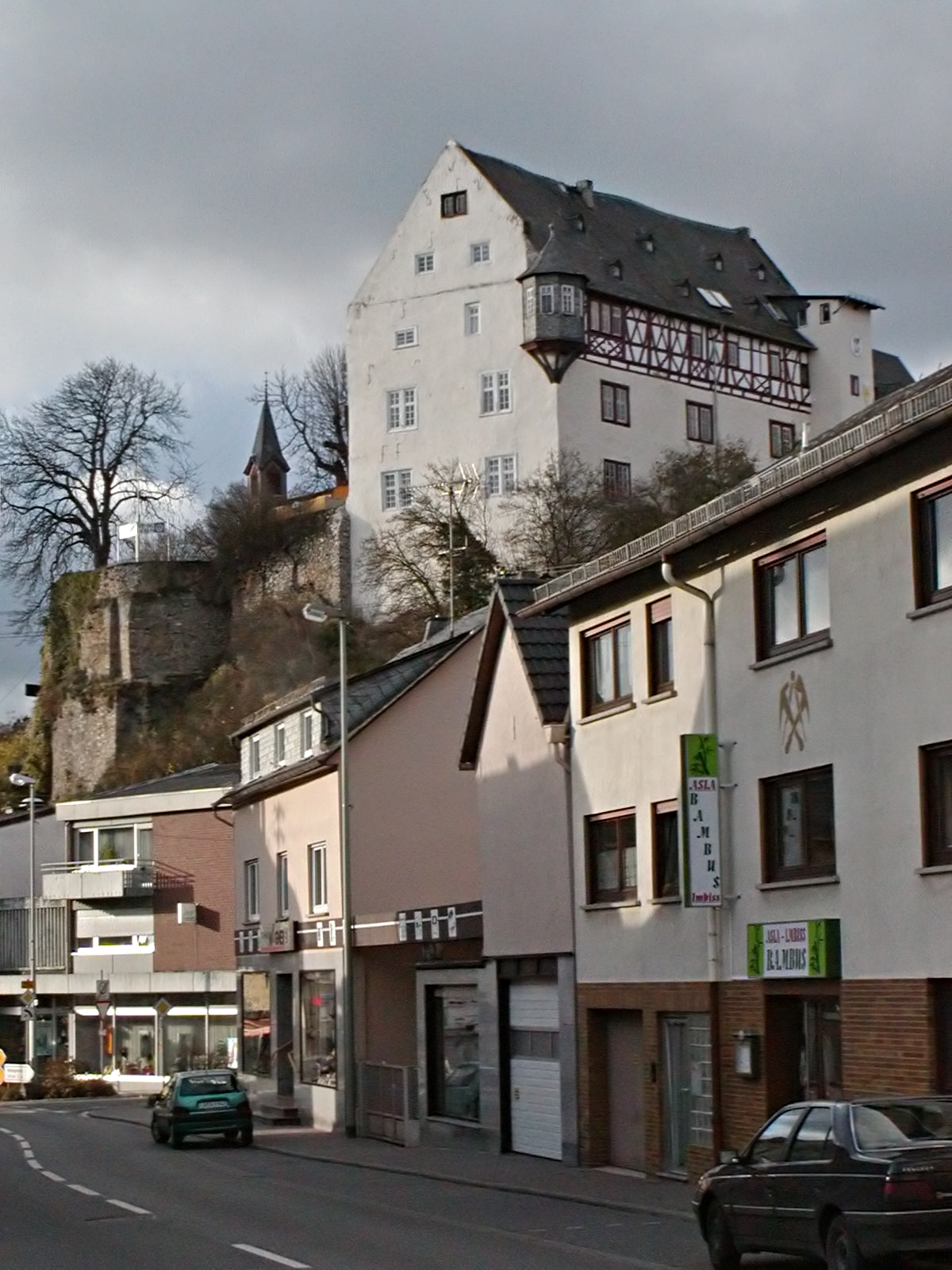
Katzenelnbogen Castle

One Diether I (c. 1065–1095) of Katzenelnbogen (literally, 'cat's elbow'), then serving as Vogt of Prüm Abbey, was first mentioned about 1070 in a deed issued by Archbishop Anno II of Cologne. From 1094 onwards, Diether and his son Henry I built Katzenelnbogen Castle in the Taunus mountain range; in 1138, King Conrad III of Germany vested his grandson Henry II with the comital title, when the Kraichgau was bequeathed to him. The counts also built Burg Rheinfels and Auerbach Castle in the 13th century and finished Burg Katz in 1371, they rebuilt the Marksburg purchased from the Lords of Eppstein and acquired highly lucrative customs rights on the Rhine River. Over nearly four centuries, the county grew bit by bit, from the Neckar to the Moselle Rivers.

Berthold II of Katzenelnbogen became a leader in the Kingdom of Thessalonica in the first decades of the 13th century.

The counts founded many cities, and for centuries or decades, they owned others, such as Offenbach, Gießen, Diez and Limburg. They also contributed to the enlargement of Eberbach Abbey, which became their family tomb in the 14th century. After the early death of Count Philipp's only son in 1453, he called himself Count of Katzenelnbogen-Diez. When Philipp died in 1479, the male line of the Katzenelnbogens became extinct. The Obergrafschaft was passed to the Landgraves of Hesse by virtue of the 1458 marriage of Henry III of Upper Hesse to Count Philipp's daughter Anna of Katzenelnbogen. Thereafter, the Landgraves of Hesse added to their title "Count of Katzenelnbogen".

The War of the Katzenelnbogen Succession was a long, drawn out legal and military conflict over inheritance from 1500 until 1557 between the Landgraviate of Hesse and the County of Nassau-Siegen.

With the formation of the Confederation of the Rhine in 1806, the County of Katzenelnbogen was annexed to the French Empire as the first of its trans-Rhine territories, and this was held until the overthrow of Emperor Napoleon I in 1814. The territory was attached to the Duchy of Nassau by the Congress of Vienna in 1815.

William III of England as Prince of Orange had the title Katzenelnbogen in his reign from 1689-1702 and today, both the Grand Duke of Luxembourg and the King of the Netherlands have the title "Count of Katzenelnbogen" as part of their style.

== History of wine ==
In 1435, Count John IV of Katzenelnbogen was building his last castle in Rüsselsheim, where he ordered the famous Riesling variety should be grown. Hundreds of vineyards were documented, many of which still exist: among them the famous rock Loreley documented in 1395.

== Vogts (Vögte) of Katzenelnbogen ==
- Diether I (born 1065; died 1095), vogt of Prüm Abbey
- Diether II (?–?)
- Heinrich I (died 1102)

== Counts of Katzenelnbogen ==
=== Original line ===
- Heinrich II (born c. 1124; died 1160)
- Heinrich III (died c. 1179)
- Diether III (born c. 1160; died c. 1219)
- Diether IV (died 1245), also Count of Lichtenberg

The county was divided in 1260 and ruled by two lines of counts.

=== Senior branch ===
- Diether V (died 1276)
- Wilhelm I (born 1276/1277; died 1331)
- Wilhelm II (born before 1331; died before 23 October 1385)
- Eberhard V (born c. 1322; died 1402)

=== Junior branch ===
- Eberhard I (born c. 1243; died 1311)
- Gerhard (died 1312), son of Eberhard I
  - Eberhard II (died 1329), son
  - Johann II (died 1357), son
    - Diether VIII (born 1340; died 1402), son
- Berthold III (died 1321), son of Eberhard I
  - Eberhard III (died 1328), son
    - Eberhard IV (died 1354), son

Eberhard IV was succeeded by Diether VIII, reuniting the junior branch.

The whole county was reunited in 1402 by Johann IV, son of Diether VIII, who had married his cousin Anna, daughter and heiress of Eberhard V, in 1385.

=== Reunited county ===
- Johann IV (died 1444)
- Philipp I (born 1402; died 1479)
- Anna (born 1443; died 1494)

Anna married Henry III, Landgrave of Upper Hesse, and the county passed to the House of Hesse.
