= Walram IV of Nassau-Idstein =

14th-century German noble

Walram IV, Count of Nassau-Idstein
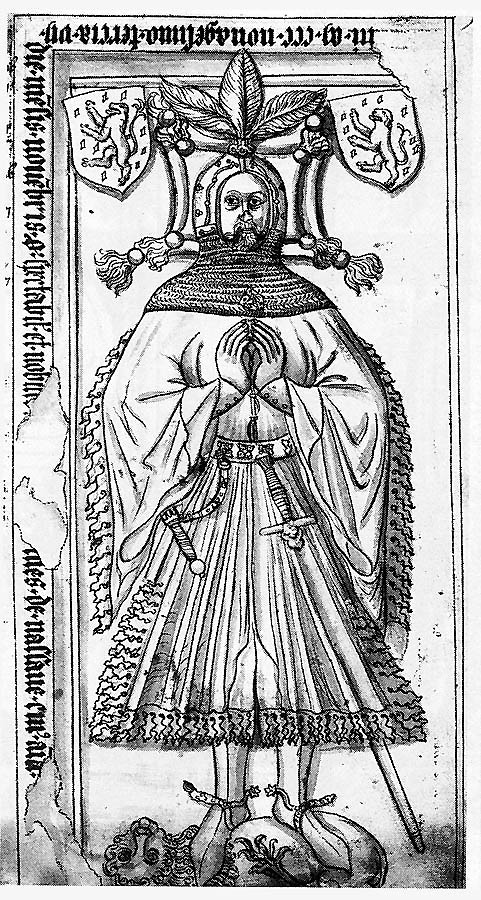
- Born: 1354
- Died: 7 November 1393
- Noble family: House of Nassau
- Spouse: Bertha of Westerburg
- Father: Adolph I, Count of Nassau-Wiesbaden-Idstein
- Mother: Margaret of Nuremberg

Count Walram IV of Nassau-Idstein (1354 – 7 November 1393) was a younger son of Count Adolph I of Nassau-Wiesbaden-Idstein and his wife Margaret of Nuremberg. He inherited Nassau-Idstein when his father died in 1370. When his brother Gerlach II died in 1386, he also inherited Nassau-Wiesbaden.

== Marriage and issue ==
He married Bertha, the daughter of Count John I of Westerburg. They had two children:

- Margaret (b. 1380), married in 1398 to Count Henry VII of Waldeck
- Adolph II (1386–1426), his successor

Walram IV of Nassau-Idstein House of Nassau Born: 1354 Died: 7 November 1393
Preceded by Adolph I	Count of Nassau-Idstein; 1370–1393	Succeeded by Adolph II
Preceded by Gerlach II	Count of Nassau-Wiesbaden; 1386–1393	Succeeded by Adolph II
