= St. Elizabeth's Church, Marburg =

Gothic church in Marburg, Hesse, Germany

St. Elizabeth's Church
- Elisabethenkirche
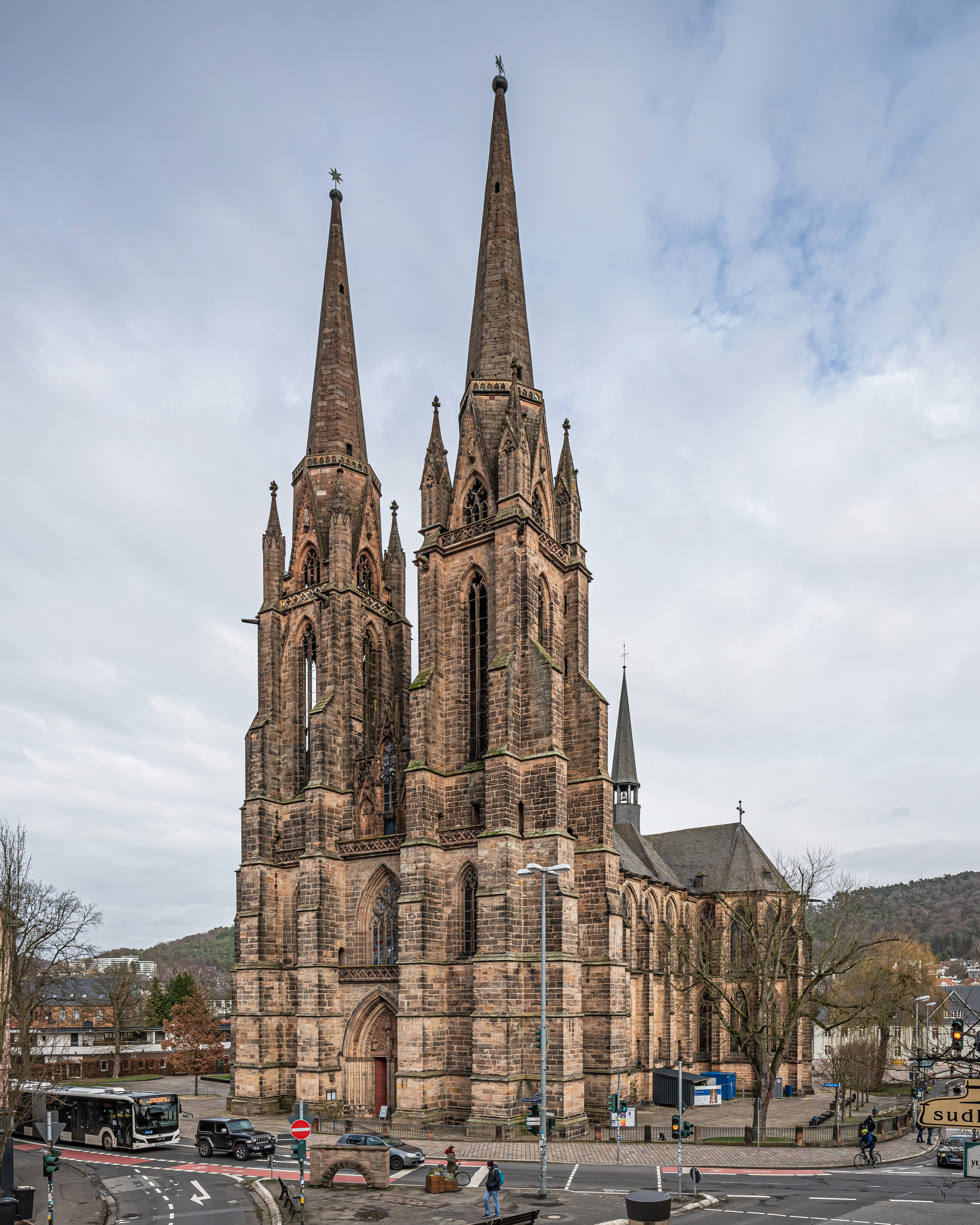
- Seen from the southwest in 2022
- St. Elizabeth's Church
- 50°48′54″N 8°46′12″E
- Location: Elisabethstraße 3 Marburg, Hesse
- Country: Germany
- Denomination: Evangelical Church in Germany
- Previous denomination: Roman Catholic Church

History
- Founded: 1235
- Founder: Conrad of Thuringia
- Dedication: Mary, Mother of God

Architecture
- Style: Gothic

St. Elizabeth's Church (German: Elisabethkirche) is an Evangelical church in Marburg, Germany. Built by the Teutonic Order on the site of Elizabeth of Hungary's tomb in the 13th century, the church is one of the earliest Gothic churches in Germany. Her tomb made the church an important pilgrimage destination during the late Middle Ages, and the Landgraves of Hesse were interred in the church. After the conversion of Landgrave Philip I in the 16th century, the church became Protestant, and remains a parish of the Evangelical Church of Kurhessen-Waldeck.

== History ==
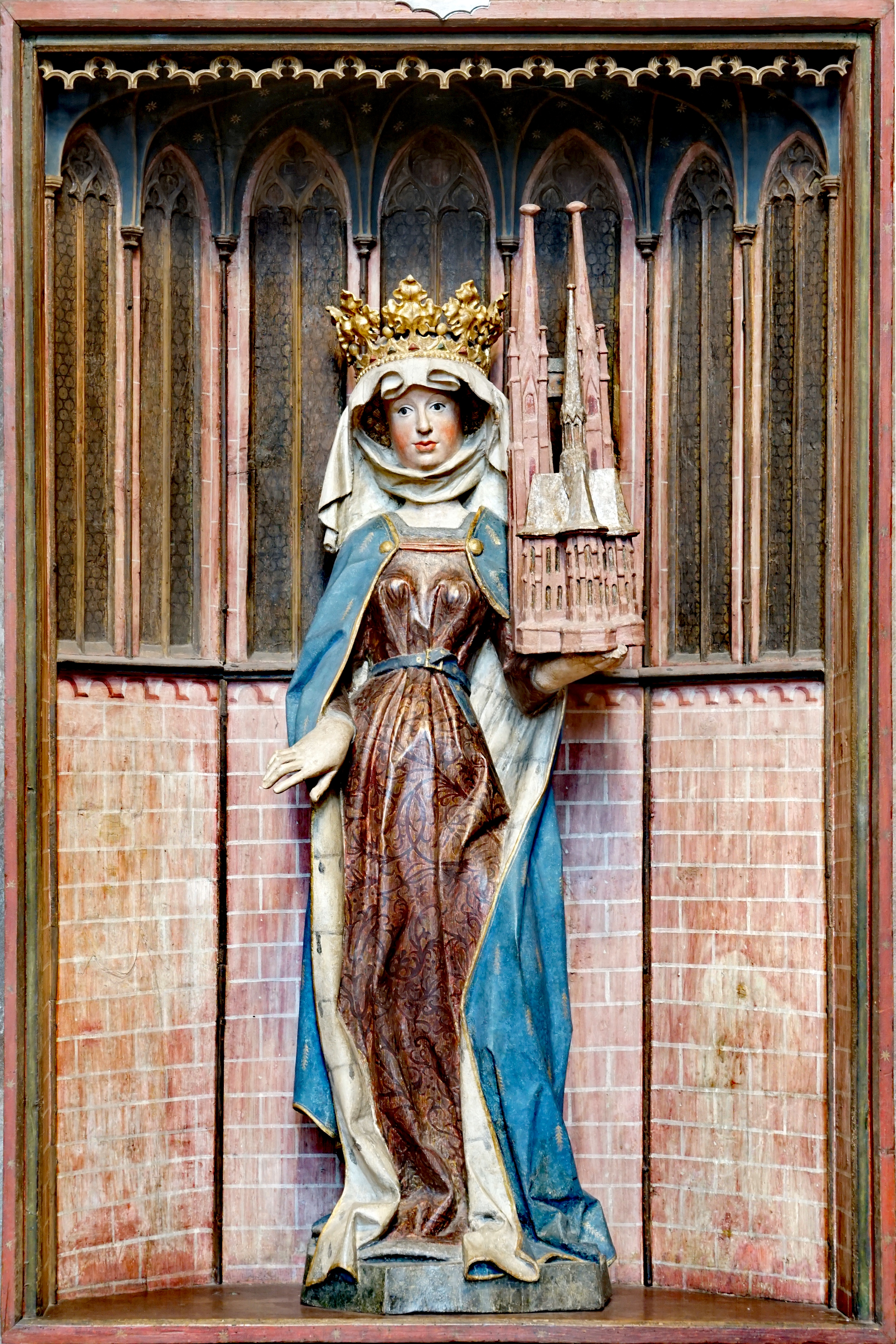
Elizabeth portrayed as donor of the church in a 15th-century sculpture

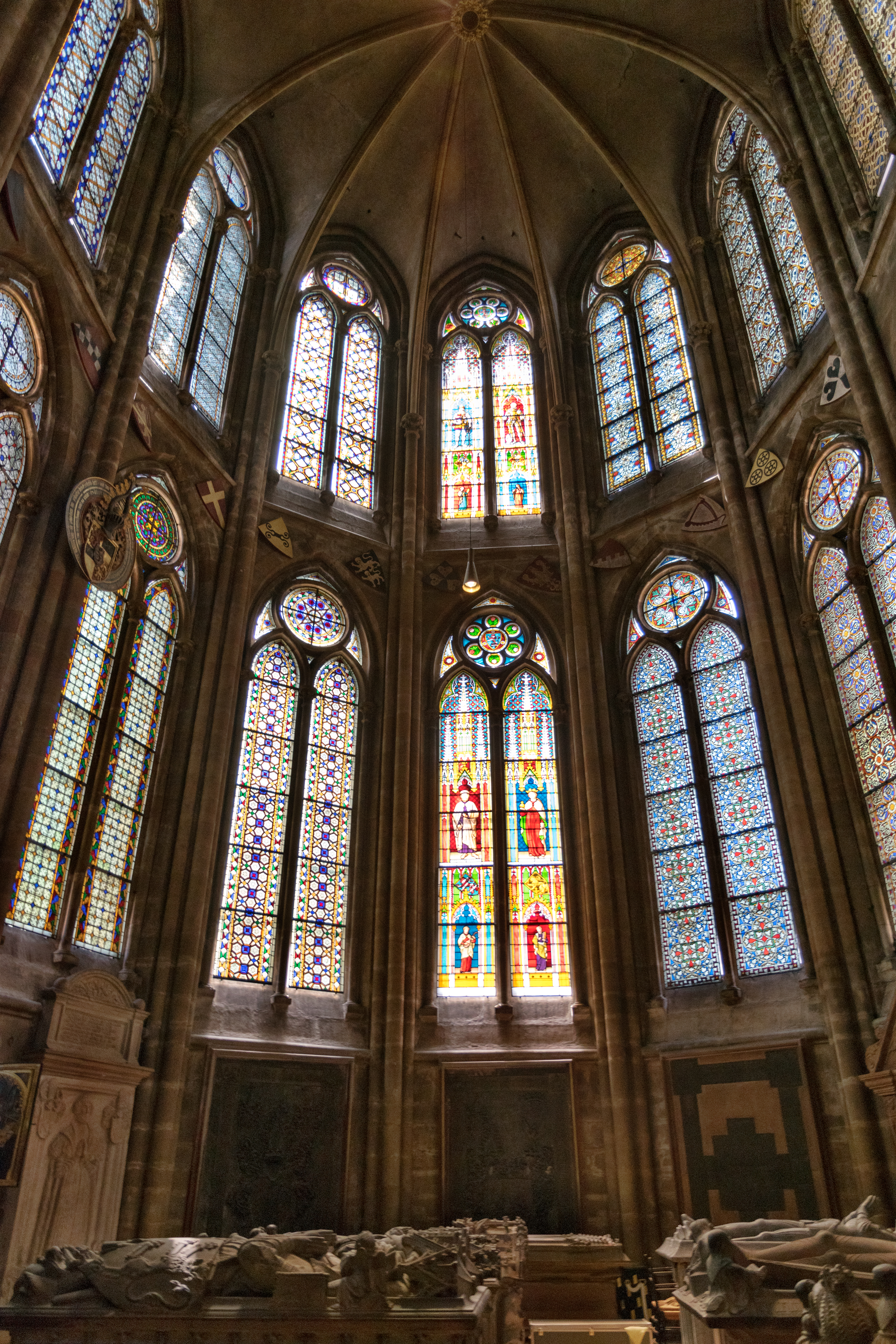
Southern choir with Margravial tombs

Saint Elizabeth founded a hospital for the sick and needy in Marburg in 1228, dedicated to Francis of Assisi. She died there in 1231, and was buried in a simple tomb inside of the hospital's modest Chapel of St. Francis. Immediately following her death, Elizabeth's grave became a site of pilgrimage and alleged healing miracles. In 1234, Elizabeth's brother-in-law Conrad of Thuringia donated the hospital to the Teutonic Knights, who undertook a comprehensive expansion of the pilgrimage infrastructure at the hospital.

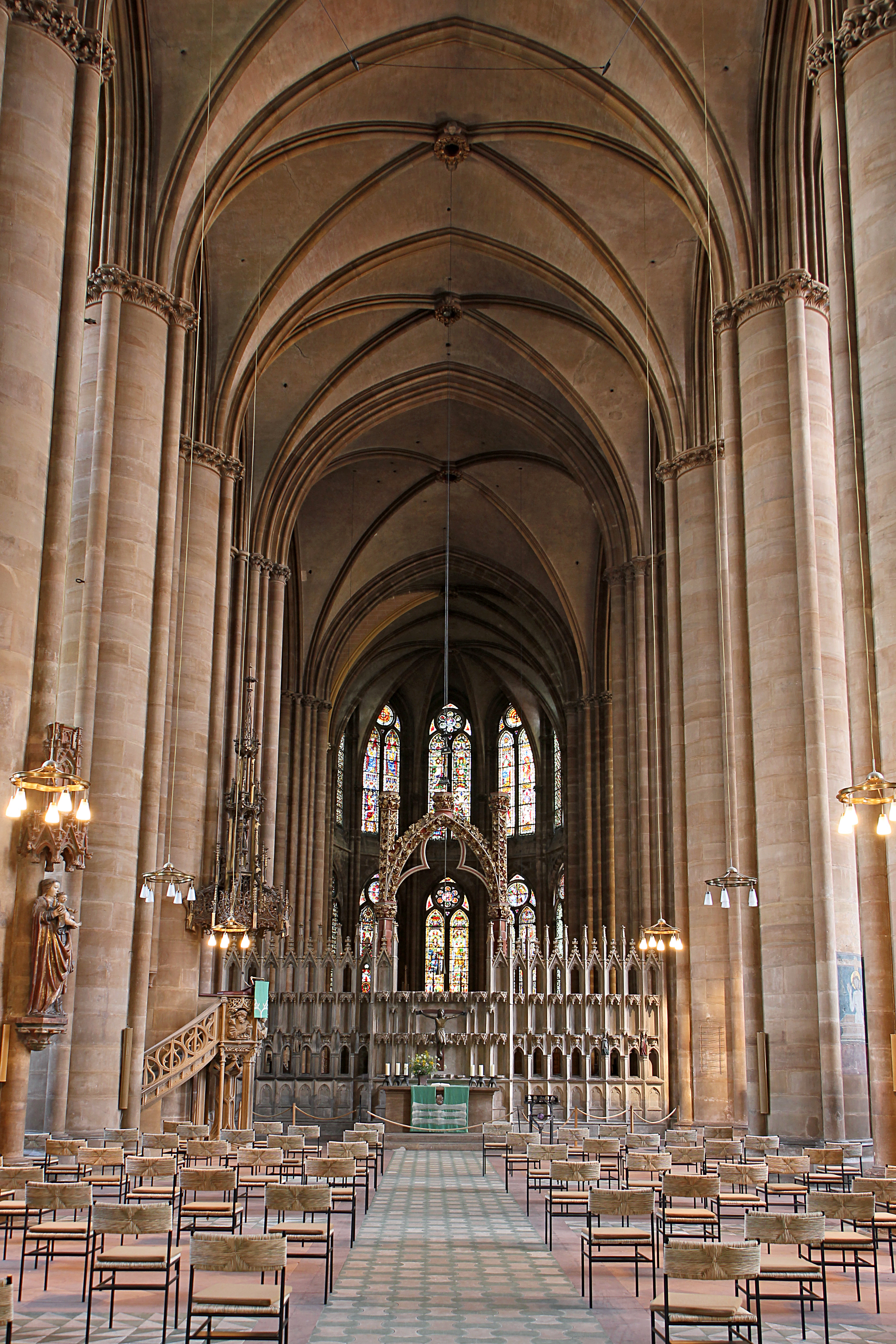
A view down the nave

Construction on the current structure started in 1235, the year Saint Elizabeth was canonized. Pope Gregory IX granted the church the authority to issue indulgences in a letter dated 30 May 1235, and the cornerstone was laid on 14 August of the same year. Elizabeth's grave was not moved, as the north apse of the new church was built on top of the original Hospital Chapel. On 1 May 1236, in the presence of Emperor Frederick II, her body was ceremoniously translated to a new bejeweled shrine. Construction proceeded rapidly, as the church was built on a unified foundation. The crossing, and triple choir was completed in the 1240s, and in 1249, further relics were brought to the church. A two-storey sacristy was completed by 1261, and the church was consecrated in 1283. However, the towers were not finished until 1340. The church was the property of the Order of the Teutonic Knights; some buildings of the Order still exist near the church, among them the Deutschhausgut, which now houses the mineral collection and the department of geography of the Philipps University of Marburg.

Although the church was named after Saint Elizabeth and referred to as such in most official communications, its official dedication was to Mary, Mother of God, the patroness of the Teutonic Order. For this reason, the church contains many depictions of Mary. In 1290, after the completion of the High Altar, Elizabeth's shrine were moved to the sacristy.

From 1240 to 1509, the Landgraves of Hesse were buried in the south choir of the church in the so-called Landgrave's Choir. In the context of the Reformation, Philip I, Landgrave of Hesse had Elizabeth's remains removed, in order to deter pilgrims from the Protestant city of Marburg. Her skull and tibiae were brought to St. Elizabeth Convent in Vienna, and an elaborate arm reliquary found its way to the chapel of Sayn Palace, at the foot of Sayn Castle. The Skull Reliquary of St. Elizabeth was looted from Marienberg Fortress in Würzburg and is now in the Swedish History Museum, Stockholm.

Most of the knights and clerics of the Order who were attached to the church converted to Protestantism during the 16th century, and the church was used for Protestant services from 1539 on. However, due to the Imperial Immediacy that the church held, it remained officially Catholic until 1570, when the last Catholic bailiwick commander of the order in Hesse died. In 1605, Landgrave Moritz converted to Calvinism and ordered all images west of the choir screen to be destroyed. The church was damaged during the Seven Years War, and was used as a powder magazine and warehouse. Restoration works were undertaken from 1767 to 1770. From 1811 to 1827, the church was a Simultaneum, meaning that both Catholic and Protestant services were held in different parts of the church. Further renovations were done between 1854-1861 and 1930-1931.

For the duration of the Second World War, the five gothic altarpieces and medieval stained glass windows were moved to Haina Abbey for safekeeping. The church was mostly undamaged by the war, although the north wall of the nave was damaged by shrapnel in a 1944 air raid. The sarcophagi of Frederick the Great and Frederick William I, originally in the Garrison Church in Potsdam, and those of Paul von Hindenburg and his wife Gertrud, originally in the Tannenberg Memorial in East Prussia, were moved to St. Elizabeth's by American Monuments Men in Summer 1945, after the sarcophagi were found, hidden from Soviet capture, in a Thuringian salt mine. The bodies of the Prussian kings were moved to Hohenzollern Castle on the initiative of Louis Ferdinand of Prussia in 1951, however, the Hindenburg couple was permanently interred in the northern tower chapel of St. Elizabeth's.

In 1954, the church was made an independent parish, and in 1969, ownership of the building was transferred from the Hessian state to the Evangelical Congregation of Marburg. Several archeological excavations since have yielded rich insights into the church's status as a medieval center of the Teutonic Order and pilgrimage site, including hundreds of pilgrims' graves below the nave. A comprehensive renovation, aimed at restoring the original interior paint scheme, was begun in 2021 and completed in 2024. Further renovation works began on the stained glass in 2023.

== Architecture ==
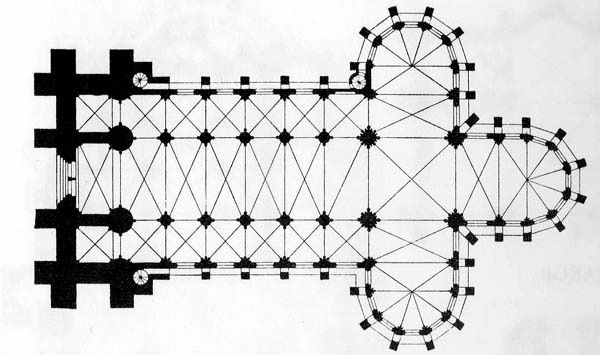
Floor plan

The church is one of the earliest purely Gothic churches in German-speaking areas, and is held to be a model for the architecture of Cologne Cathedral. It is built from sandstone in a cruciform layout, and is considered by architectural historians to be an early example of a hall church with an attached triconch choir at the east end of the church. The nave and its flanking aisles have a vaulted ceiling more than 20 m (66 ft) high. The triconch choir consists of the northern Elisabeth Choir, the eastern High Choir and the southern Landgrave Choir. The crossing is separated from the nave by a stone choir screen. In earlier times, the front part of the church had been reserved for the knights of the Order. The church has two towers with an approximate height of 80 m (263 ft). The northern one is crowned by a star, the southern one by a knight. The representative west portal of the church, completed in 1270, shows the Virgin Mary flanked by angels in a floral setting.

The High Choir of the church, completed in 1249, contains six 13th and 14th-century stained glass windows, which are representative of a transitional Romanesque-Gothic style. Most of the stained glass windows in the church were heavily damaged in the Seven Years War, and remnants were put together haphazardly. Only after a restoration in the 1970s was the actual order of images in the Elizabeth Window, depicting the life and deeds of Saint Elizabeth, reconstructed. The church also contains a number of 19th- and 20th-century stained glass windows.

At the corner of the northern (Elisabeth) choir, there is a large mausoleum dating to 1280, which is situated above the spot where Elizabeth was originally laid to rest in St. Francis' Hospital Chapel, before her shrine was moved to the sacristy. The church also contains five significant Gothic altars, the most valuable of which is the polychromed 1290 High Altar. The Altar of the Cross, situated in front of the choir screen, is topped with a crucifix by Ernst Barlach, commissioned in 1931 to commemorate the 700th anniversary of Elizabeth's death. This crucifix was removed from the church in 1936 as an example of Degenerate Art, however, it was spared from destruction and placed back on the altar following the fall of the Nazis.

The Gothic shrine of St. Elizabeth is the most important treasure of the church. It was begun in 1235 and completed in 1249 upon the translation of Elizabeth's relics to the new choir. It is constructed of oak, sheathed in gilded silver and copper, and covered in pearls and gems sourced from the Mediterranean, including an original three dozen engraved gems. Many of these gems have been lost to looting and burglary since the shrine's first display, most recently in a 1920 burglary. It is now encased in glass. The pseudo-architectural shrine is lined by sculptures of Christ and the Apostles, while the roof of the shrine shows scenes from the life of Elizabeth and Mary, along with a crucifixion group.

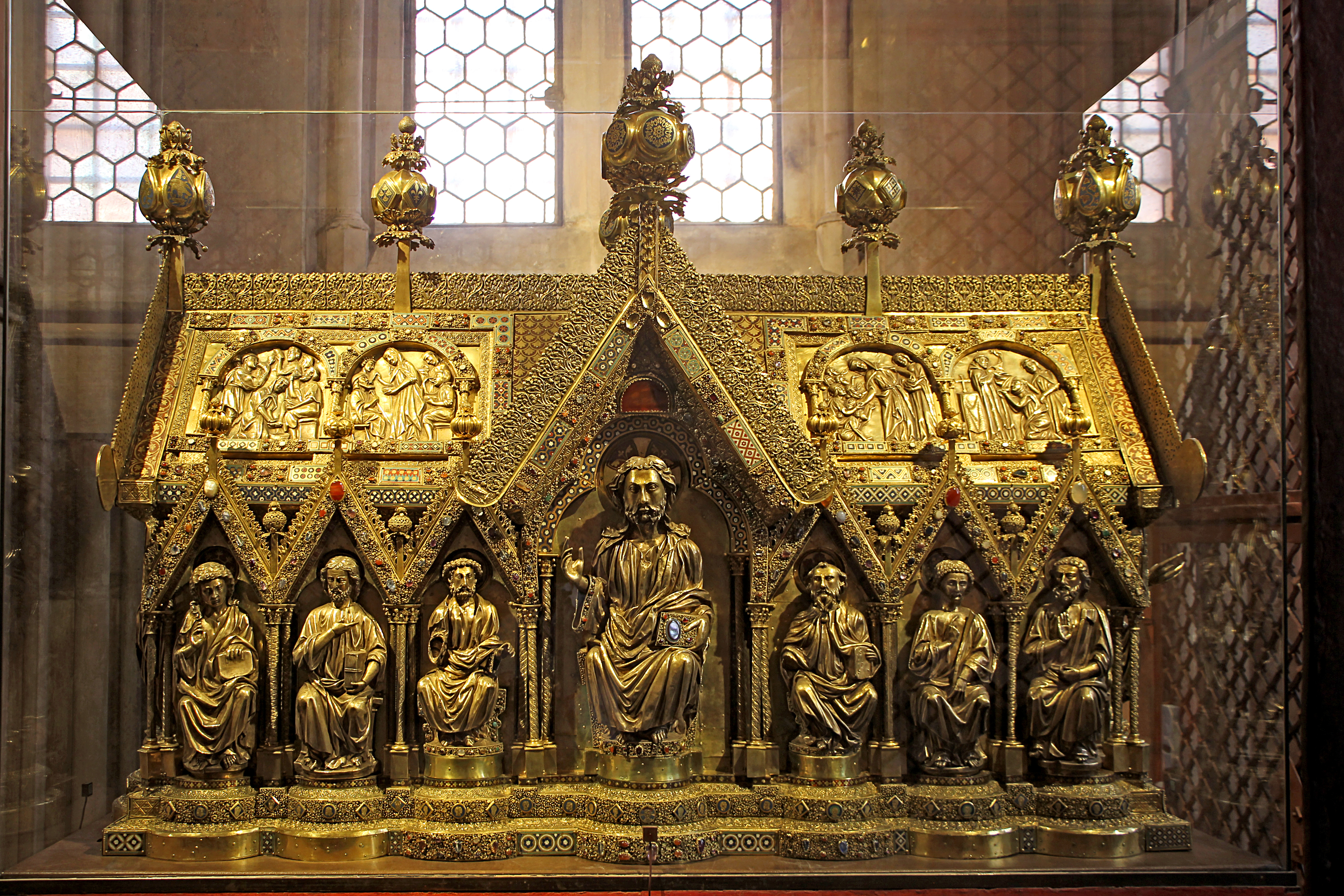
The shrine of Saint Elizabeth

St. Elizabeth's church also contains a wealth of other treasures, including the original choir screen and pulpit, misericords, sacrament niche and piscina.

St. Elizabeth's has hosted a number of organs since the 16th century. The church's main organ is a 2006 Klais with 57 registers across three manuals and pedals. There is an additional choir organ, built in 1960 by Werner Bosch, and a 2006 Gerhard Woehl positive organ, intended to produce an early baroque sound.

St. Elizabeth's church has served as an inspiration for numerous churches, including the roughly contemporary Church of our Lady in Frankenberg, the Neogothic St. Paul's Church in Strasbourg, St. Elizabeth's Church in Erzsébetváros, Budapest, St. Sebastian Church, Berlin, and St. Mary's Church in Stuttgart. St. Martin's Episcopal Church in Houston, the largest such parish in the United States, is also closely based on St. Elizabeth's Church.

St. Elizabeth's Church competes for the title of being the earliest fully Gothic building in Germany with a handful of other buildings in western Germany. These are the church at Marienstatt Abbey near Streithausen, the Liebfrauenkirche in Trier, and Tholey Abbey in Saarland.

== Pulpit ==
In 1909, the church in Marburg received a completely new pulpit featuring carved ornamentation in the Gothic style. The pulpit is adorned all around with relief busts of saints. The canopy forms a finely detailed roofscape and culminates in a spire topped with a cross.

== See also ==
- Konrad von Marburg
