= Adolph I of Nassau-Wiesbaden-Idstein =

German nobleman

Adolph I, Count of Nassau-Wiesbaden-Idstein
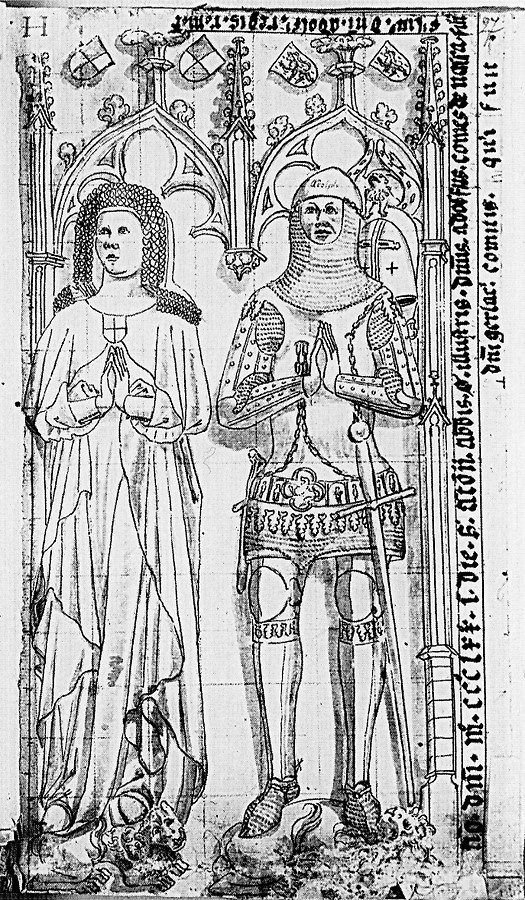
- Born: 1307
- Died: 17 January 1370 (aged 62–63)
- Noble family: Nassau
- Spouse: Margaret of Nuremberg
- Father: Gerlach I of Nassau-Wiesbaden
- Mother: Agnes of Hesse

Adolph I, Count of Nassau-Wiesbaden-Idstein (1307 – 17 January 1370) was a son of Count Gerlach I and Agnes of Hesse. In 1344, his father abdicated in favor of his sons. They ruled jointly until 1355, then divided their inheritance:

- Adolph I inherited Nassau-Wiesbaden-Idstein (this line died out in the male line in 1605)
- John I inherited Nassau-Weilburg (this line died out in the male line in 1912)
- Rupert inherited Nassau-Sonnenberg (he died childless in 1390)

== Marriage and issue ==
In 1322 Adolph married Margaret of Nuremberg, the daughter of Frederick IV, Burgrave of Nuremberg. They had the following children:

- Gerlach II (1333–1386), inherited Nassau-Wiesbaden
- Frederick (d. 1376) was minister in Mainz
- Agnes (d. 1376), married Werner IV, Count of Wittgenstein
- John
- Margaret was abbess of Klarenthal Monastery
- Elisabeth (d. 1389), married in 1361 to Diether VIII, Count of Katzenelnbogen
- Adolph I of Nassau (1353–1390), Archbishop of Mainz from 1379
- John II (1353–1420), Archbishop of Mainz from 1397
- Anna was abbess of Klarenthal Monastery
- Walram IV (1354–1393), inherited Nassau-Idstein
- Catherine (d. 1403), married in 1373 to Reinhard IV, Count of Westerburg
- Frederick
- Walram II
- Joanna

Adolph I of Nassau-Wiesbaden-Idstein House of Nassau Born: 1307 Died: 17 January 1370
| Preceded by Gerlach I | Count of Nassau-Wiesbaden-Idstein; 1344–1370 | Succeeded by Gerlach II as Count of Nassau-Wiesbaden |
| Preceded by Gerlach I | Count of Nassau-Wiesbaden-Idstein; 1344–1370 | Succeeded by Walram IV as Count of Nassau-Idstein |
