= John II of Cleves =

Duke of Cleves, a state of the Holy Roman Empire

John II, Duke of Cleves
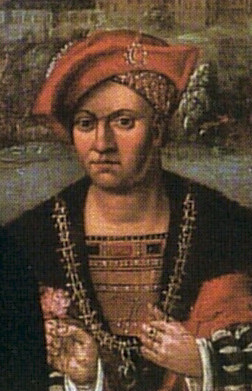
- John II, Duke of Cleves
- Born: 13 April 1458; Cleves
- Died: 15 March 1521 (aged 62); Cleves
- Noble family: La Marck
- Spouse: Mathilde of Hesse
- Issue: John III, Duke of Cleves illegitimate 63 others
- Father: John I, Duke of Cleves
- Mother: Elizabeth of Nevers

John II, "The Babymaker", Duke of Cleves, Count of Mark, (German: Johann II. "der Kindermacher", Herzog von Kleve, Graf von Mark) (13 April 1458 – 15 March 1521) was a son of John I, Duke of Cleves and Elizabeth of Nevers. He ruled Cleves from 1481 to his death in 1521. He was called "The Babymaker" as he had fathered sixty-three illegitimate children prior to his marriage with Mathilde of Hesse in 1489.

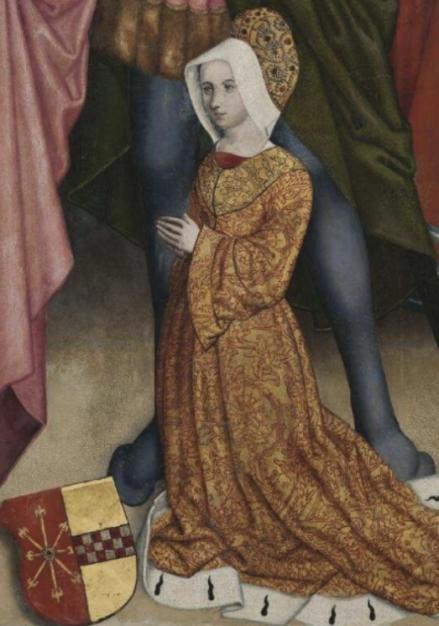
John's daughter, Anna

Pope Innocent VIII awarded John the Golden Rose on 15 April 1489. This is remarkable in light of the fact that John, with his alleged 63 illegitimate children, had the dubious reputation of being a "child maker". From then on, John called himself "Johann von Kleve, Count of La Marck and Katzenelnbogen".

== Marriage and issue ==
John married Matilda of Hesse, daughter of Henry III, Landgrave of Upper Hesse and Anna of Katzenelnbogen, on 3 November 1489 in Soest. They had:

- John (1490–1539), succeeded as Duke of Cleves and Count of the Marck
- Anna (1495–1567), married in 1518 with count Philip III of Waldeck-Eisenberg
- Adolf (1498–1525), appointed by his father's cousin Philip of Cleves, Lord of Ravenstein and Wijnendale, as his successor, but died before Philip did in 1528

With Catherine de Chaumont:

- Hermann of Cleves seigneur d'Afnois, d'Amazy and Saligny (1458-1532), married Leonarde Perreau, legitimized in 1506.

With unknown mothers:

- Helena (or Hedwig) of Cleves (1480-?), married Otto van Büren
- Joos (Judocus) of Cleves (1485-1541)
- Wilhelm of Cleves (c. 1495 -?)
- Marten of Cleves
- Hendrik of Cleves
- Katharina of Cleves, married Johann von Asschebroick and secondly Johann von Loe
- Elisabeth of Cleves, married Gobert van Bemmel
- Dietrich of Cleves (?-1493)
- Johann of Cleves
- Adolf of Cleves, married Agnes von Hessen zu Hulhausen
Coat-of-arms of
La Mark

Coat-of-arms of
Cleves

== Ancestry ==
Ancestors of John II of Cleves

8. Adolph I of Kleve-Mark (1334–1394)
4. Adolph I, Duke of Cleves (1373–1448)
9. Margaret of Jülich (c. 1342–1425/29)
2. John I, Duke of Cleves (1419–1481)
10. John II, Duke of Burgundy (1371–1419)
5. Marie of Burgundy (c. 1393–1473)
11. Margaret of Bavaria (1363–1423)
1. John II, Duke of Cleves
12. Philip II, Count of Nevers (1389–1415)
6. John II, Count of Nevers (1415–1491)
13. Bonne of Artois (1396–1425)
3. Elizabeth of Nevers (1439–1483)
14. Raoul III d'Ailly
7. Jacqueline d'Ailly (c. 1420–1470)
15. Jacqueline of Bethune

== Sources ==
- Boltanski, Ariane (2006). Les ducs de Nevers et l'État royal: genèse d'un compromis (ca 1550 - ca 1600) (in French). Librairie Droz S.A.
- Guenther, Ilse (1985). "John II, Duke of Cleves and Mark". In Bietenholz, Peter G.; Deutscher, Thomas Brian (eds.). Contemporaries of Erasmus: A Biographical Register of the. Vol. 1-3: A-Z. University of Toronto Press.
- Morby, John (1989). Dynasties of the World: A chronological and genealogical handbook. Oxford University Press.
- Ward, A.W.; Prothero, G.W.; Leathes, Stanley, eds. (1934). The Cambridge Modern History. Vol. XIII. Cambridge at the University Press.

John II of Cleves House of La Marck Born: 13 April 1458 Died: 15 March 1521
Preceded by John I, Duke of Cleves	Duke of Cleves, Count of Mark; 1481–1521	Succeeded by John III, Duke of Cleves
