= Henry III of Upper Hesse =

Henry III
- Landgrave of Upper Hesse; Landgrave of Hesse-Marburg
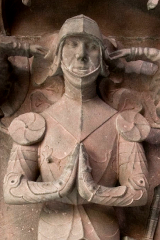
- Effigy of Henry III, Landgrave of Upper-Hesse in St. Elizabeth's Church.
- Born: 15 October 1440
- Died: 13 January 1483 (aged 42)
- Buried: St. Elizabeth's Church, Marburg, Germany
- Noble family: House of Hesse
- Spouse: Anna of Katzenelnbogen
- Issue: Frederick; Ludwig III; Elisabeth of Hesse-Marburg; William III, Landgrave of Hesse; Mathilde of Hesse; Heinrich
- Father: Louis I, Landgrave of Hesse
- Mother: Anna of Saxony

Henry III, Landgrave of Upper Hesse, called "the Rich" (15 October 1440 – 13 January 1483), was the second son of Louis I of Hesse, and Anna of Saxony.

Upon the death of his father Louis I in 1458, Henry received Upper Hesse and his brother Louis II received Lower Hesse. He succeeded to the title of Landgrave of Hesse-Marburg in 1458. His nickname "the Rich" is indicative of his fortune in territory and tolls on the Rhine received by his marriage to Anna, daughter and heir of Philipp, the last Count of Katzenelnbogen and Anne of Württemberg.

== Life ==
Henry was the second son of Landgrave Ludwig I of Hesse and his wife Anna of Saxony. Ludwig I had stipulated in his will that Henry and his brother Ludwig (1438–1471) should share the landgraviate equally between them, but did not concretize this provision until his death. Ludwig II initially decided on Lower Hesse and left Marburg and the land on the Lahn to Heinrich, where he ruled as Heinrich III. He received his nickname "the Rich" due to his marriage to Anna of Katzenelnbogen (daughter of Philipp I) and the territorial gains associated with it, which also came with considerable financial gain, including the lucrative revenues from Rhine customs.

The dispute over the exact division of the landgraviate between the two brothers dragged on for more than ten years. Several appraisals and arbitration awards had no effect. After initial encroachments, the conflict finally escalated in 1468/69 into an open feud, the so-called Hessian Brother War. A peace brokered by the third brother, Hermann, later archbishop of Köln, initiated renewed partition negotiations. The result was another agreement at a Diet of the Hessian Landstände in Spieskappel Monastery, on the traditional border between Lower and Upper Hesse, in 1470. Again, some points remained unresolved. However, further discussion was unnecessary, since Ludwig II died already in 1471. Henry III took over the guardianship of Ludwig II's two sons and ruled over Lower and Upper Hesse until his death in 1483.

The Marburg line became extinct with Heinrich's son, Wilhelm III, in 1500, and its possessions fell by inheritance to the Kassel line.

== Children ==
His daughter Elisabeth (1466–1523) would go on to marry John V, Count of Nassau-Siegen and they would become grandparents to William the Silent. His younger daughter, Mathilde (1473–1524), would go on to marry John II, Duke of Cleves and they would become grandparents to Queen Anne of Cleves. Henry's only son to reach adulthood succeeded as William III (Wilhelm III, Landgraf von Hessen-Marburg) (1471–1500). In 1498, William ΙΙΙ married Elisabeth, the daughter of Philip, Elector Palatine. William ΙΙΙ left no legitimate heir and the title passed to his cousin, William II, Landgrave of Hesse, son of Louis II, Landgrave of Lower Hesse.

Henry also had an illegitimate daughter, Contzel (* before 1471; † before 1508), with a woman named Christina (Steyna), the wife of the painter Johannes Dietz († 1480) of Marburg. Contzel married Ludwig Orth (about 1460–1523), the several-times mayor of Marburg, and their descendants include Johann Wolfgang von Goethe.

== Ancestry ==
Ancestors of Henry III of Upper Hesse

8. Louis the Junker of Hesse (1305-1345)
4. Hermann II, Landgrave of Hesse (1341-1413)
9. Elisabeth of Sponheim (1318-1345)
2. Louis I, Landgrave of Hesse (1402-1458)
10. Frederick V, Burgrave of Nuremberg (bef. 1333-1398)
5. Margaret of Hohenzollern-Nuremberg (c.1360-1406)
11. Elisabeth of Meissen (1329-1375)
1. Henry III, Landgrave of Upper Hesse
12. Frederick III, Landgrave of Thuringia (1332-1381)
6. Frederick I, Elector of Saxony (1370-1428)
13. Catherine of Henneberg-Schleusingen (?-1397)
3. Anna of Saxony (1420-1462)
14. Henry the Mild, Duke of Brunswick-Lüneburg (c.1364-1416)
7. Catherine of Brunswick-Lüneburg (c.1389-1442)
15. Sophie of Pomerania (c.1370-1406)

Regnal titles
Preceded by Louis I	Landgrave of Upper Hesse; 1458–1483	Succeeded by William III
