= Diether VIII of Katzenelnbogen =

Count of Katzenelnbogen

Diether VIII, Count of Katzenelnbogen
- Born: 1340; Katzenelnbogen
- Died: 19 February 1402 (aged 61–62)
- Noble family: House of Katzenelnbogen
- Spouse: Elisabeth of Nassau-Wiesbaden-Idstein
- Issue: Johann IV, Count of Katzenelnbogen, Elizabeth (died 1393), Margaret (died 1438)
- Father: Johann II, Count of Katzenelnbogen
- Mother: Elizabeth of Isenburg-Limburg

Diether VIII, Count of Katzenelnbogen (1340 - 19 February 1402) was a Count from the younger line of the House of Katzenelnbogen. He ruled in Upper Katzenelnbogen. In 1376 he took part in the coronation of King Wenceslaus IV of Bohemia, as King of Germany.

Diether was the son of Johann II of Katzenelnbogen (died 2 March 1357) and Elizabeth of Isenburg-Limburg. Diether was married on 8 June 1361 to Elisabeth of Nassau-Wiesbaden-Idstein (died 1 February 1389), a daughter of Adolph I of Nassau-Wiesbaden (1307-1370). They had the following children:

- Johann IV, married 1385 Anna von Katzenelnbogen from the older line of Katzenelnbogen
- Elizabeth (died 1393), married 1387 Count Henry IV of Veldenz
- Margaret (died 1438), married 1385 John II of Isenburg-Büdingen

In 1391 Diether married the widow of Count Rupert of Nassau-Sonnenberg (died 1390), Anna von Nassau-Hadamar (died 1404). Anna was the last countess of Nassau-Hadamar, and the House of Katzenelnbogen gained possession of Nassau-Hadamar when Anna sold her rights to her stepson Johann IV.

After Diether's death in 1402, his son Johann reunited the upper and lower counties of Katzenelnbogen by virtue of his marriage to Anna, daughter of Eberhard V of the older line of Katzenelnbogen.
