= Louis I, Landgrave of Hesse =

German nobleman (1402–1458)

Louis I
- Landgrave of Hesse
- Born: 6 February 1402; Spangenberg
- Died: 17 January 1458 (aged 55)
- Noble family: House of Hesse
- Spouse: Anna of Saxony
- Issue: Louis II; Henry III; Hermann IV; Elisabeth; Friedrich
- Father: Hermann II, Landgrave of Hesse
- Mother: Margaret of Hohenzollern-Nuremberg

Louis I (German: Ludwig; 6 February 1402 – 17 January 1458), nicknamed the Peaceful (German: der Friedsame), was Landgrave of Hesse from 1413 to 1458. Following Louis' death, his sons, Henry III and Louis II, divided Hesse into Upper and Lower sections.

== Life ==
Louis was born at Spangenberg, the son of Hermann II, Landgrave of Hesse, and Margaret, the daughter of Frederick V of Nuremberg. He married Anna (5 June 1420 - 17 September 1462) daughter of Frederick I, Elector of Saxony on 13 September 1436. Their children were:

- Louis II (7 September 1438 - 8 November 1471)
- Henry III (15 October 1440 - 13 January 1483)
- Hermann IV, Archbishop of Cologne (1450 - 19 October 1508)
- Elisabeth (14 December 1453 - 22 April 1489), married John III, Count of Nassau-Weilburg
- Friedrich (1458- 1 June 1463)

After 1425 a conflict with the Electorate of Mainz over claims to power in Hesse broke out into open conflict and Archbishop Conrad III of Mainz suffered a decisive defeat at Fulda in 1427.

Louis I, Landgrave of Hesse House of Hesse Born: 6 February 1402 Died: 17 January 1458
Regnal titles
Preceded by Hermann II	Landgrave of Hesse; 1413–1458	Succeeded by Henry III as Landgrave of Upper Hesse
Preceded by Hermann II	Landgrave of Hesse; 1413–1458	Succeeded by Louis II as Landgrave of Lower Hesse
