= Philip of Nassau =

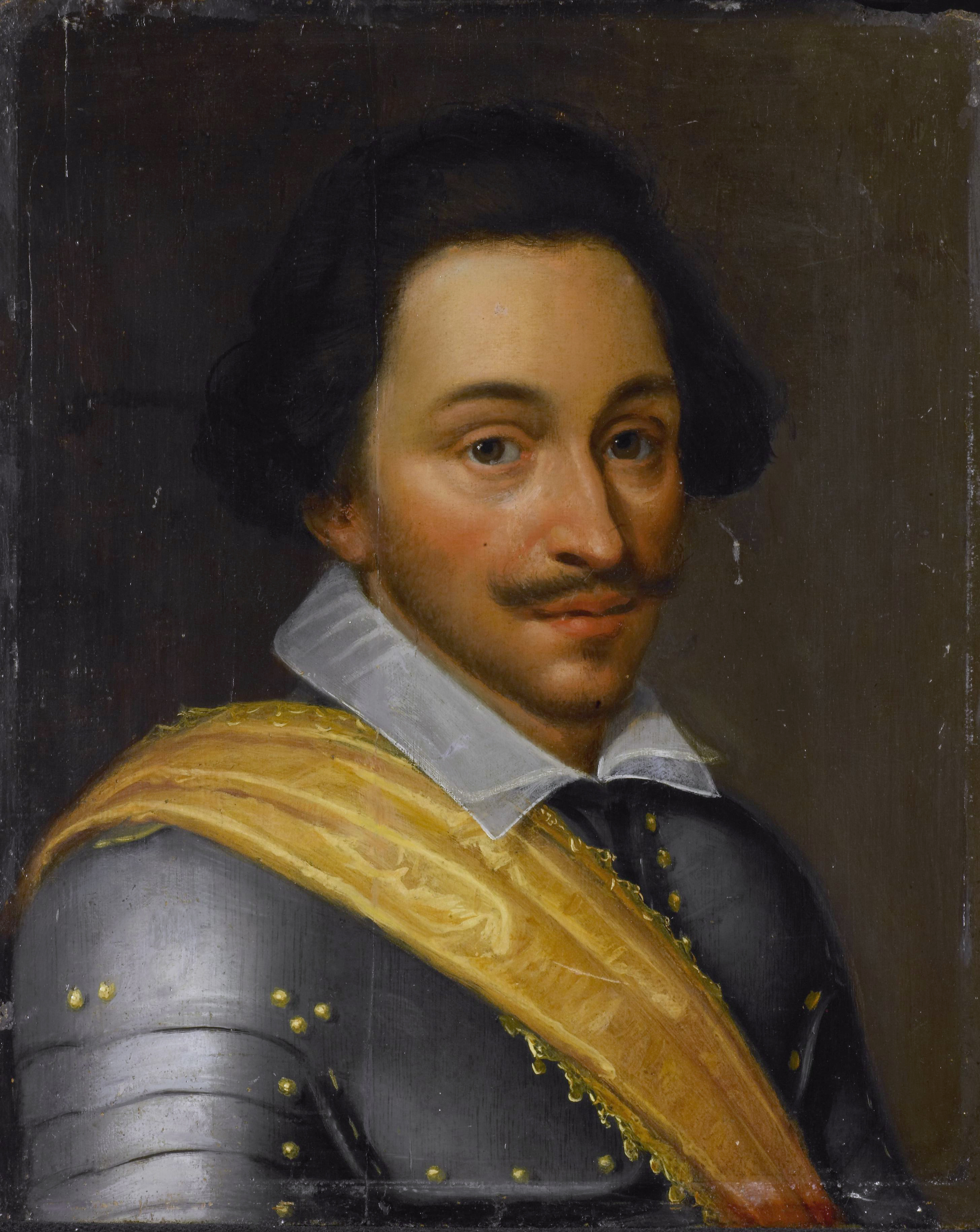
- Portrait of Philip of Nassau by Jan Antonisz. van Ravesteyn
- Born: 1 December 1566
- Died: 3 September 1595 (aged 28)
- Buried: St Eusebius' Church in Arnhem
- Noble family: House of Nassau
- Father: John VI, Count of Nassau-Dillenburg
- Mother: Countess Elisabeth of Leuchtenberg

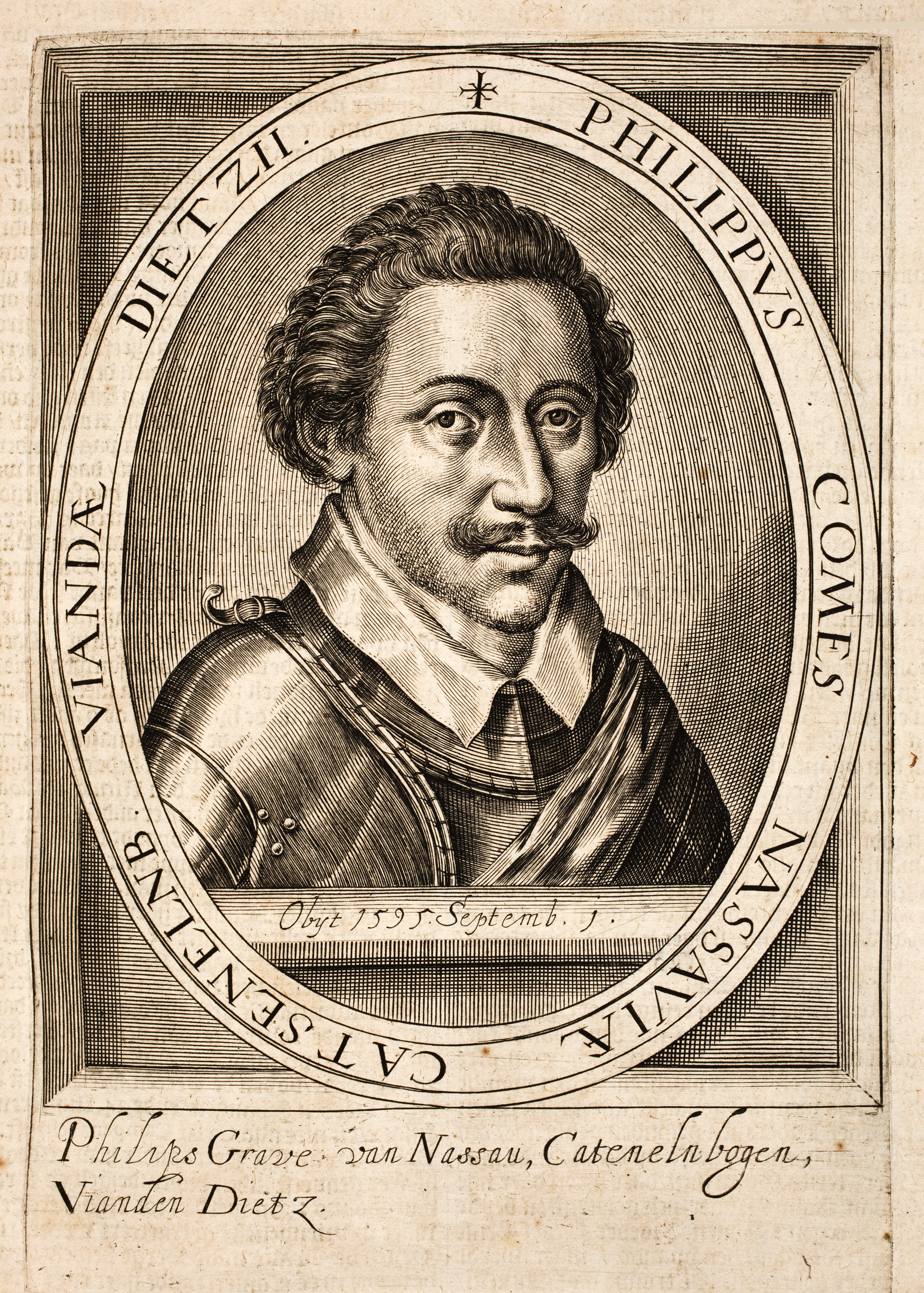
Engraving of Philip of Nassau

Philip of Nassau or Filips of Nassau (1 December 1566, Dillenburg – 3 September 1595, Rheinberg) was a Count of Nassau, Katzenelnbogen, Vianden and Dietz, fought for the United Provinces during the Eighty Years' War. He was the son of John VI and Countess Elisabeth of Leuchtenberg.

Philip studied with his brother William Louis and his cousin Maurice in Heidelberg, and later with his cousin Maurice in Leiden. He then spent some time in the retinue of his uncle William the Silent, who called him Flipchen ("Flippy"). Later, he enlisted in the Dutch States Army and in 1585 he became colonel of the infantry.

From 1586 to 1587, Philip was governor of Gorinchem, then in 1591, after the Siege of Nijmegen, he was governor of Nijmegen. From Nijmegen Philip started a campaign in Luxembourg, where he engaged the Spanish enemy. In 1594, he participated in the Reduction of Groningen. Then, on 2 September 1595, he commanded more than 500 cavalry, in the battle on the Lippe, along with his brothers Louis Gunther and Ernst Casimir. During the battle, Philip got seriously injured. The next day he died.

He was buried on 22 October 1595 in the St Eusebius' Church in Arnhem.

== References and sources ==
- Reinildis van Ditzhuizen, Oranje Nassau, een biografisch woordenboek, 3rd ed., Becht, 1998, ISBN 90-230-1124-4
- Dr. A.W.E. Dek, Genealogie van het Vorstenhuis Nassau, Europese Bibliotheek, Zaltbommel, 1970
