= Countess Elisabeth of Leuchtenberg =

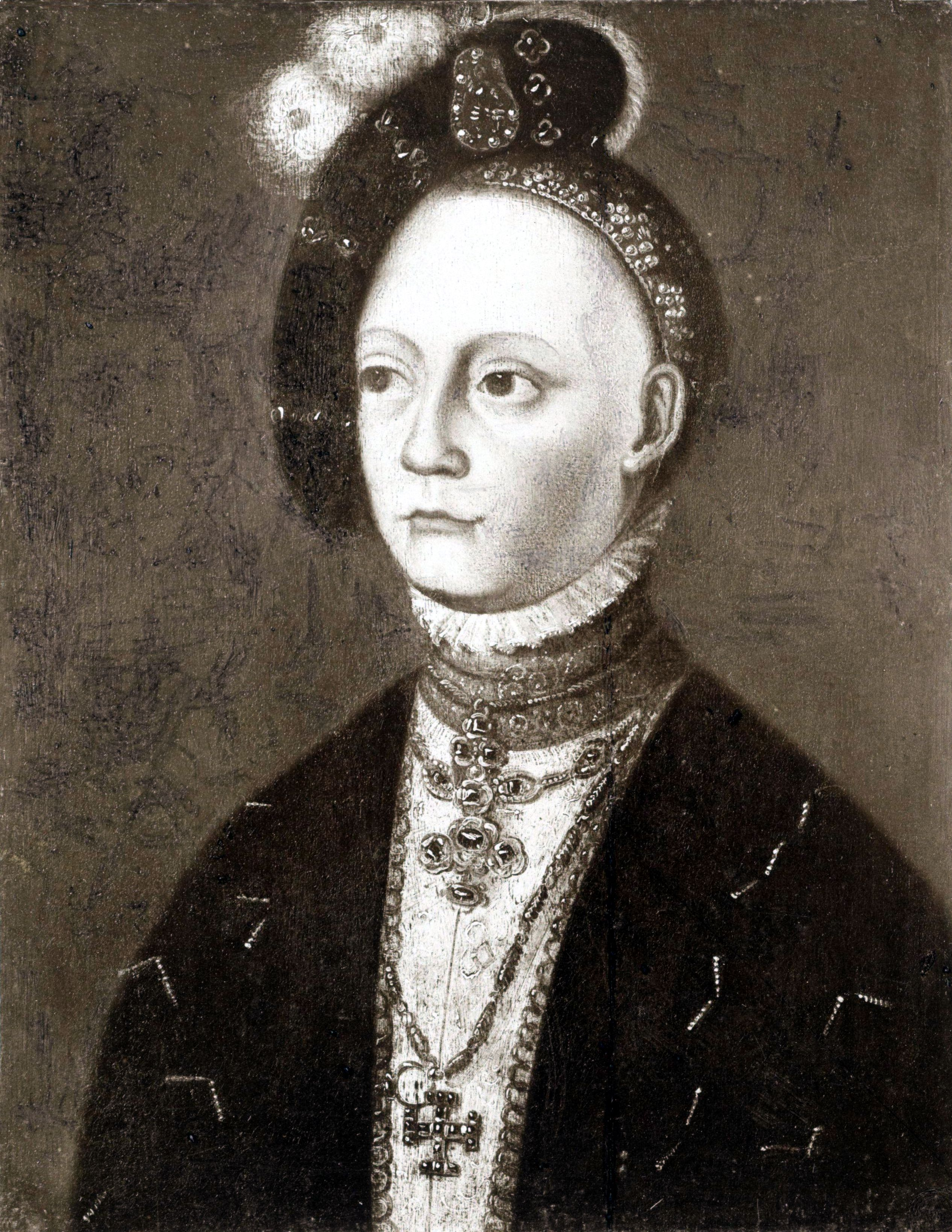
- Born: March 1537
- Died: 6 July 1579; Dillenburg
- Noble family: Leuchtenberg
- Spouse: John VI of Nassau-Dillenburg
- Father: George III, Landgrave of Leuchtenberg
- Mother: Margravine Barbara of Brandenburg-Ansbach-Kulmbach

Elisabeth of Leuchtenberg (March 1537- 6 July 1579 in Dillenburg) was the elder daughter of Landgrave George III, Landgrave of Leuchtenberg and Margravine Barbara of Brandenburg-Ansbach (1495–1552).

After her death, the German theologian Christoph Pezel wrote an obituary about her.

== Portraits ==
At least two portraits of Elisabeth of Leuchtenberg exist. The first is in the collection of the Rijksmuseum in the form of an anonymous picture, made between 1850 and 1930, a reproduction of a painting by an unknown painter. The second is a drawing in circular shape.

Another portrait, also made by an anonymous painter, was initially identified as portrait of Charlotte of Bourbon, but it was later identified by L.J. van der Klooster as possibly Elisabeth van Leuchtenberg.

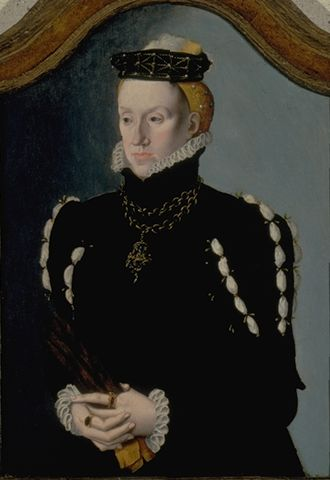
Possibly Elisabeth van Leuchtenberg. She is wearing a dark dress with puff sleeves and rings on her index fingers.

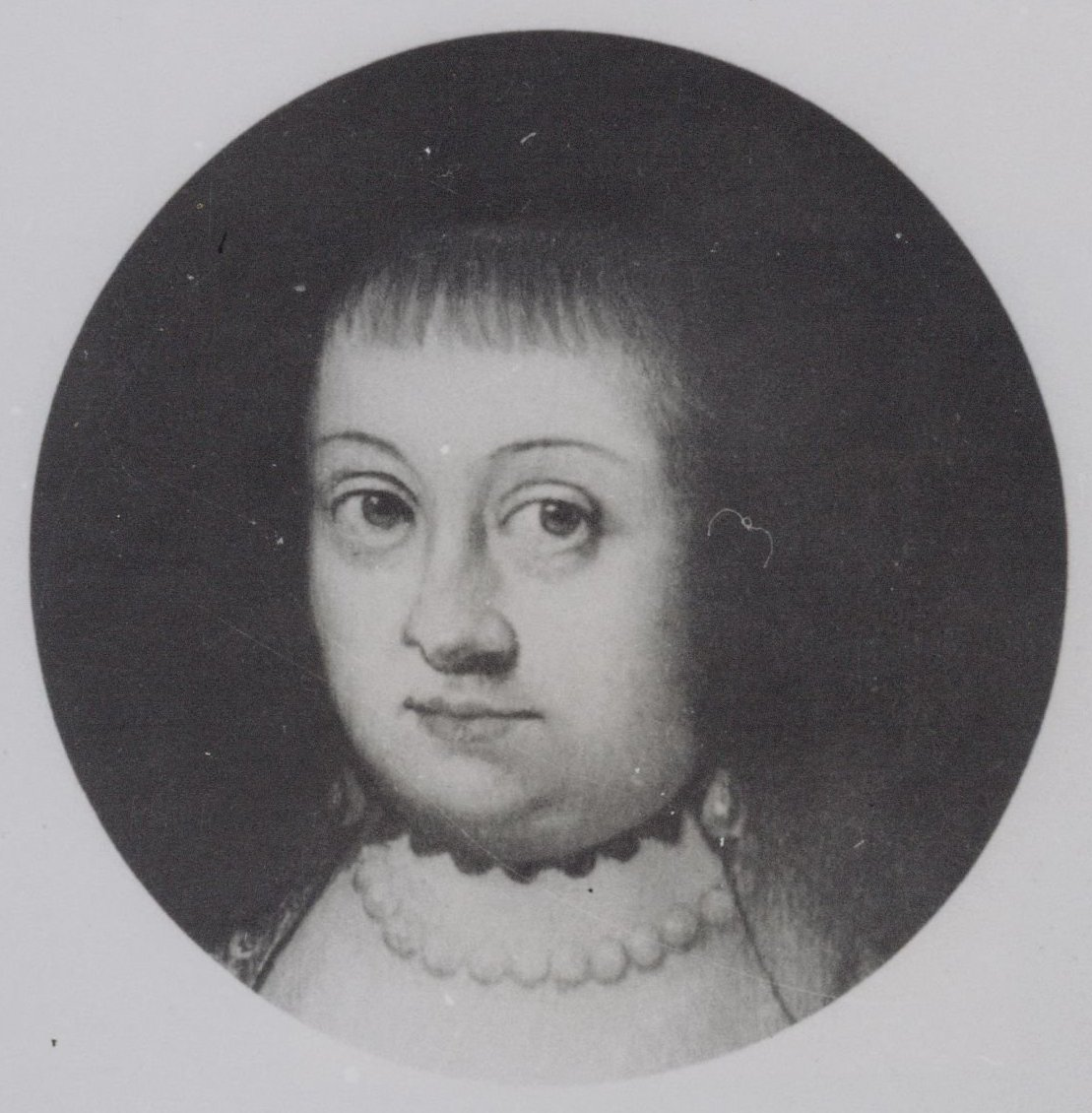
Photo of a drawing. Collection Royal House of the Netherlands.

== Marriage and issue ==
Elisabeth was the first wife of John VI of Nassau-Dillenburg, son of William "the Rich" of Nassau and Juliana of Stolberg. They married on 6 June 1559 at Dillenburg Castle and went on to have thirteen children in the next twenty years:

- William Louis (1560–1620), stadtholder of Frisia (1584–1620), married Anna of Nassau (1563–1588)
- John VII (1561–1623)
- George (1562–1623)
- Elisabeth (1564–1611), married in 1583 with Philip IV, Count of Nassau-Weilburg and in 1603 with Wolfgang Ernst I of Isenburg-Büdingen-Birstein,
- Juliana (1565–1606)
- Philip (1566–1595)
- Maria (1568–1625), married John Louis I of Nassau-Wiesbaden-Idstein,
- Anna Sibylla (1569–1576), died young
- Mathilda (1570–1625), married Count William V, of Mansfeld-Arnstein
- Albert (1572-1572), died young
- Ernst Casimir (1573–1632), Count of Nassau-Dietz, stadtholder of Frisia and Groningen (1620–1632), married in 1597 with Sophia Hedwig of Brunswick-Lüneburg (1583–1642). The Dutch Royal Family descends from this marriage.
- Louis Gunther (1575–1604), died in battle at Sluis, married in 1601 Countess Margareta of Manderscheid-Blankenheim (1575–1606)
- stillborn son (1579)

Elisabeth died in 1579. John VI remarried twice after her death and fathered even more children.
