= Maria Amalia of Nassau-Dillenburg =

- Born: 27 August 1582
- Died: 31 October 1635 (aged 53)
- Noble family: House of Nassau
- Spouses: William I, Count of Solms-Braunfels
- Father: John VI, Count of Nassau-Dillenburg
- Mother: Kunigunde Jakobäa of Simmern

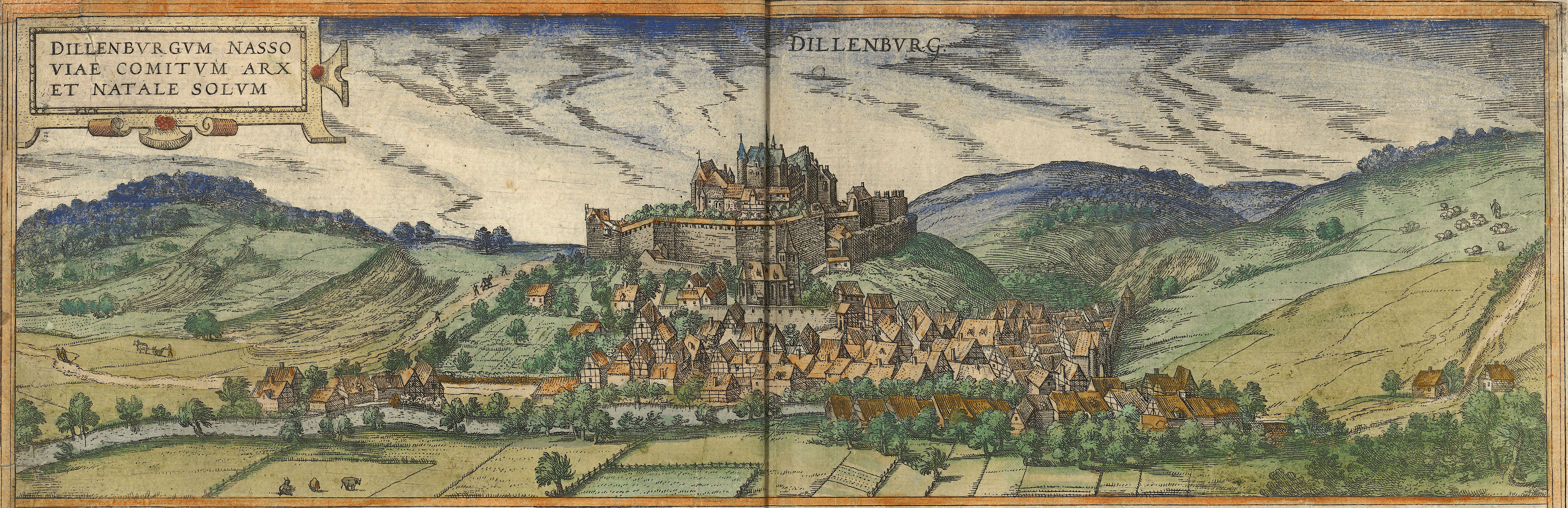
Dillenburg in 1575, showing the old castle at the top of the hill and the St. Johanniskirche below it

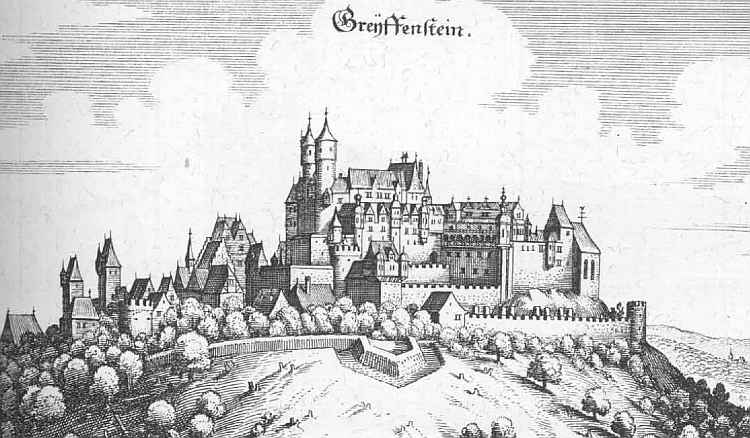
Greifenstein Castle by Matthäus Merian, 1655.

Maria Amalia (or Amalie), born countess of Nassau-Dillenburg (27 August 1582 – 31 October 1635) was countess of Solms-Greifenstein. In 1600 she married William I, Count of Solms-Braunfels (1570-1635), and their descendants ruled the region for many generations to come.

== Life ==
Maria Amalia was born at Dillenburg Castle in 1582 as a daughter of John VI, Count of Nassau-Dillenburg and his second wife, Countess Palatine Kunigunde Jakobäa of Simmern.

At the age of 18, at August 22, 1600 in Dillenburg, she married her 30 year old cousin William I, Count of Solms-Braunfels (1570-1635). He was a son of Conrad of Solms-Braunfels and Elisabeth of Nassau-Dillenburg, who was Maria Amalia's aunt. This marriage was brought forward on special request of Philipp Ludwig II, Count of Hanau-Münzenberg.

After the death of Count Konrad of Solms-Braunfels in 1592, the county of Solms-Braunfels had been partitioned between itself, Solms-Greifenstein and Solms-Hungen. Since 1592 William I was Count of Solms-Greifenstein, with her marriage Maria Amalia became countess. Between 1602 and 1606 within 44 months she gave birth to three daughters and a son. In the next fourteen years she gave birth to another six children.

In 1606, after the death of her father John VI, Count of Nassau-Dillenburg, Maria Amalia received 2000 guilders as part of her inheritance. She came into sole possession of the Solmser Hof in Edingen, Hessen in 1629, which is today one of the cultural heritage monuments in Sinn (Hessen).

In 1619 a second daughter of John VI married a Solmser Count. On 8 February 1619 Juliana (1565-1630), daughter of John VI's first wife Elisabeth of Leuchtenberg, married Count John Albrecht I of Solms-Braunfels.

From 1618 to 1648 the whole of Germany with the rest of Europe was caught up in the Thirty Years' War. In the plague year of 1635-1636 both Maria Amalia, her husband William I, and their eldest son died.

In 1635 William II followed in his fathers footsteps and was ruler of Solms-Greifenstein until 1676. His son Wilhelm Moritz (1651–1720) reunited the county of Solms-Greifenstein and Solms-Braunfels, which he ruled until 1720. He was succeeded by his son Friedrich Wilhelm (1696–1761), who was appointed Reichsfürst in 1742.

=== Family ===
William I and Maria Amalia had the following children:

- Joanna Elisabeth (27 December 1602 – 27 March 1627)
- John Conrad (17 December 1603 – 4 December 1635), married Anna Margaret of Solms-Hohensolms
- Juliana (30 May 1605 – 16 August 1629)
- Sabine (b. 9 July 1606), married George Hartmann of Zinzendorf-Pottendorf
- Amalia (11 September 1607 – 4 November 1608)
- William II (9 August 1609 – 19 July 1676), married Jhanetta Sibylla of Solms-Hohensolms and, secondly, Ernestine Sophie of Hohenlohe-Schillingsfürst
- Louis (7 April 1614 – 7 November 1676), married Anna Maria of Criechingen
- Kunigunde (18 June 1615 – 22 October 1635)
- Anna Amalia (2 June 1617 – 4 November 1635), married Philip Reinhard II of Solms-Hohensolms
- Ernest Casimir (11 June 1620 – 9 August 1648)
