= Elisabeth of Nassau-Dillenburg =

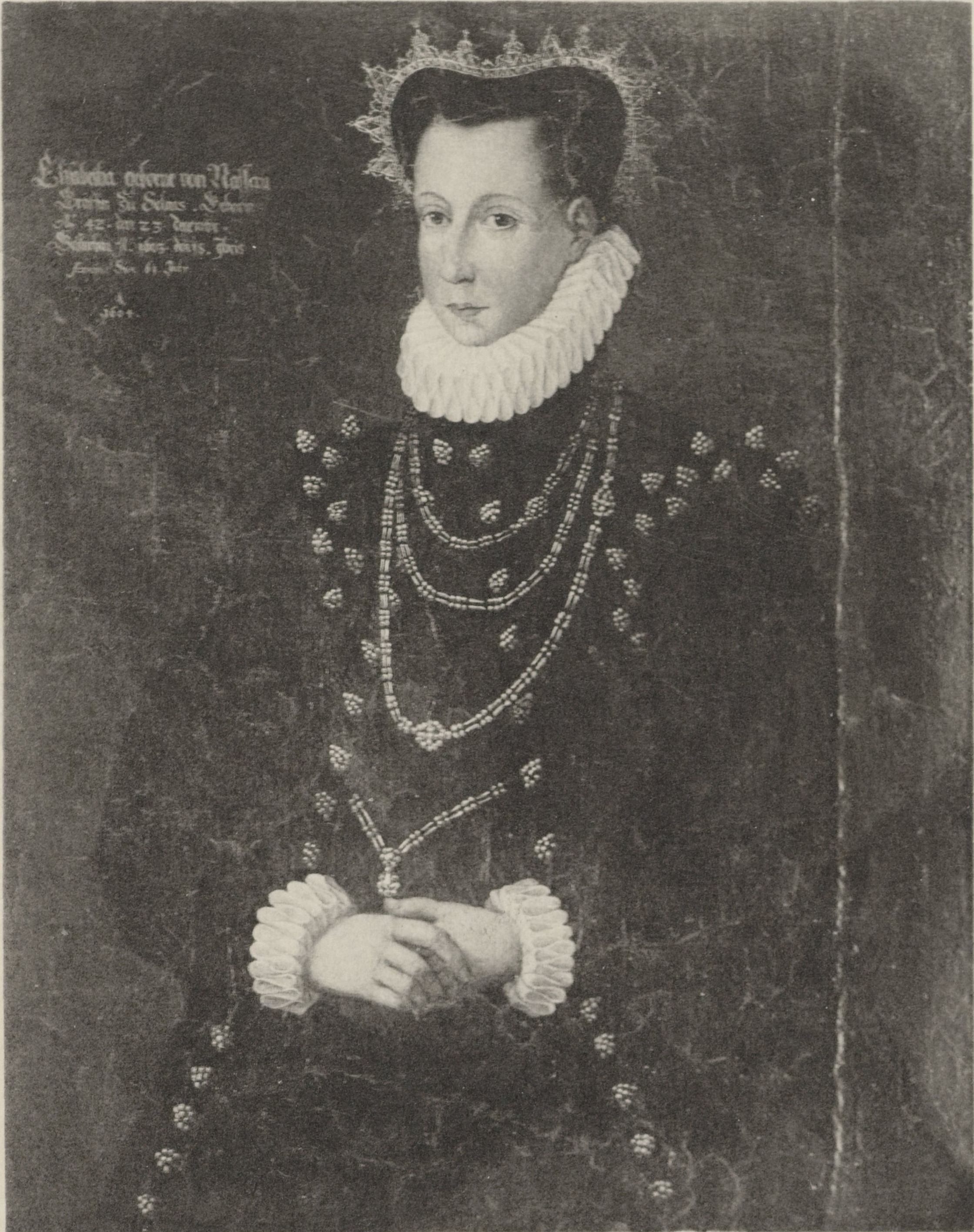
- Portret van Elisabeth, gravin van Nassau (1542-1603)
- Born: 25 September 1542; Dillenburg
- Died: 18 November 1603 (aged 61); Dillenburg
- Noble family: House of Nassau
- Spouse: Conrad, Count of Solms-Braunfels
- Father: William I, Count of Nassau-Siegen
- Mother: Juliana of Stolberg

Countess Elisabeth of Nassau-Dillenburg (25 September 1542, Dillenburg – 18 November 1603, Dillenburg) was a daughter of William I, Count of Nassau-Siegen and Juliana of Stolberg and one of the sisters of William the Silent.

== Marriage and issue ==
On 16 June 1559, she married Count Conrad of Solms-Braunfels at the age of 16. They had 14 children, nine of whom lived to adulthood:

- Philip Frederick (13 October 1560 – 26 June 1567), died in childhood
- Juliana (5 February 1562 – 19 February 1563), died in childhood
- John Albert I (5 March 1563 – 14 May 1623), married Countess Agnes of Sayn-Wittgenstein. They were the parents of Amalia of Solms-Braunfels.
- Eberhard (11 January 1565 – 12 February 1596)
- Elisabeth (18 March 1566 – 28 July 1570), died in childhood
- Ernest (18 November 1568 – 24 August 1595)
- William I (18 April 1570 – 3 February 1635), married Maria Amalia of Nassau-Dillenburg
- Otto (3 January 1572 – 23 July 1610)
- Reinhard (27 March 1573 – unknown), married Walburga Anna of Daun and, secondly Elisabeth of Salm
- Philip (29 March 1575 – 20 January 1628)
- Juliana (7 May 1578 – 1634), married Louis II of Sayn-Wittgenstein
- Anna Elisabeth (15 April 1580 – 18 August 1580), died in infancy
- Henry (10 March 1582 – 23 April 1602)
- Anna Maria (3 January 1585 – 19 June 1586), died in childhood

Amalia of Solms-Braunfels, a daughter of her eldest son John Albert I, married her nephew Frederick Henry, Prince of Orange.

Maria Amalia of Nassau-Dillenburg, the second wife of her son William I, was a daughter of Elisabeth's brother John VI, Count of Nassau-Dillenburg from his second marriage to Kunigunde Jakobäa of Simmern, so Elisabeth was both Maria's aunt and her mother-in-law.
