= St Eusebius' Church, Arnhem =

Church in Arnhem, The Netherlands

St. Eusebius church
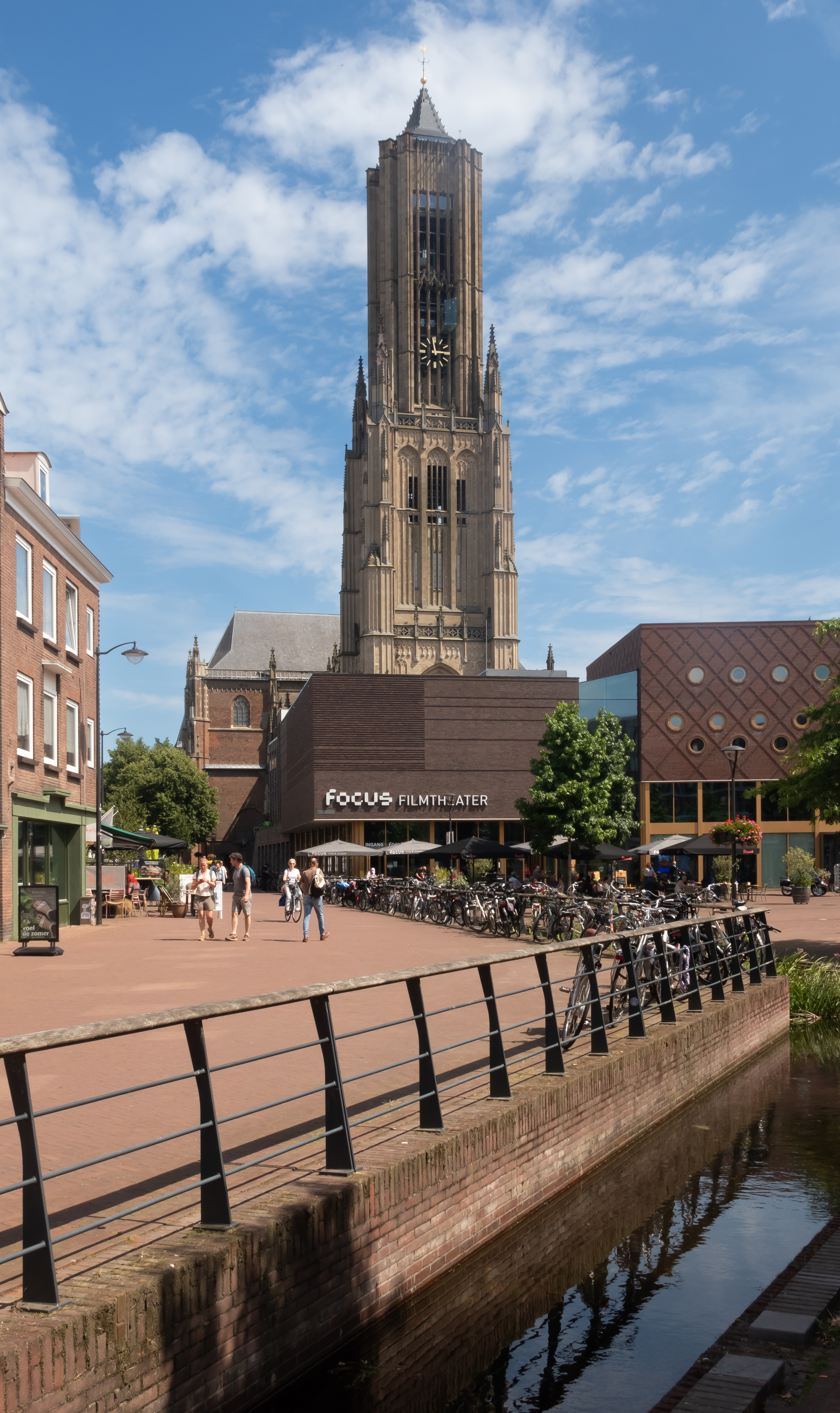
- St. Eusebius church tower

Religion
- Affiliation: Reformed

Location
- Location: Arnhem, Netherlands
- Interactive map of St. Eusebius church
- Coordinates: 51.9790°N 5.9102°E

Architecture
- Type: Church tower
- Style: Gothic
- Groundbreaking: 1450
- Completed: 1550 / 1964
- Height (max): 93 m (305.12 ft)
- Designated as NHL: Dutch rijksmonument #8336 / #8337

St. Eusebius church also known as the Eusebiuskerk or the Grote Kerk, at 93 metres is the largest church, and the largest building in Arnhem, The Netherlands.

Notably the building contains an elevator that was added to the church in 1994, which allows visitors to travel to the top of the spire and view the city of Arnhem from its highest point. More intriguing perhaps, visitors can also enter the crypt at the rear of the church which contains a number of full skeletons lying in state, in the darkness of the church's crypt.

== Initial construction ==
On the site of the present building initially stood a church dedicated to St. Martinus but after some relics of St. Eusebius arrived in the town during the early part of the 15th century, it was decided to build a new church dedicated to the saint at the old site. This new structure gradually replaced the old building over the next century, commencing when Arnold, Duke of Egmond laid the first stone in 1452.

== World War II damage ==
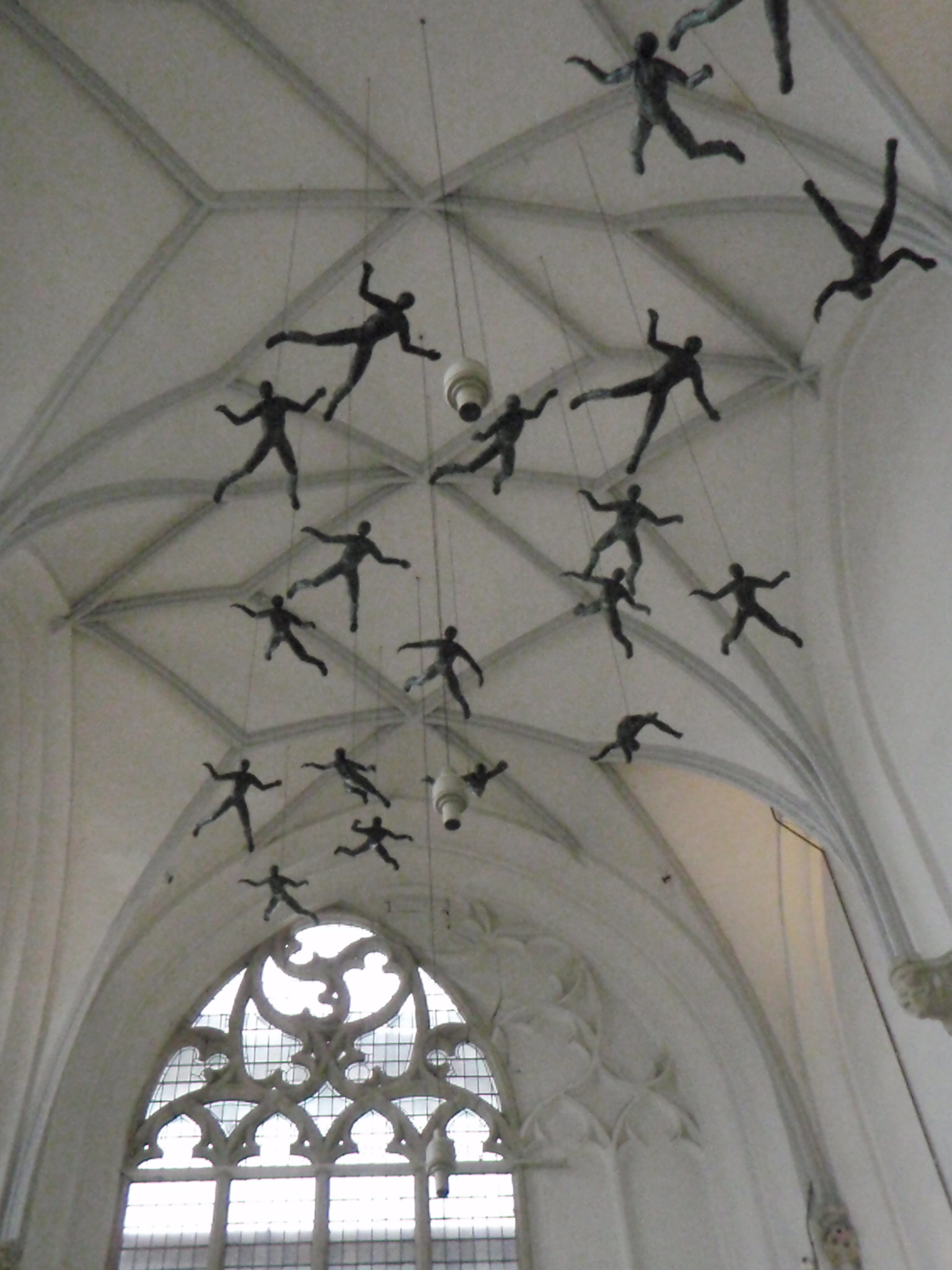
Paratrooper memorial inside church

The church was extensively damaged during the Second World War following Operation Market Garden in 1944. When the battle over the bridge that crosses the Rhine occurred, between paratroopers under the command of British Lieutenant-Colonel John Dutton Frost and the Germans, the church was completely burnt out. Later the tower, weakened by the fire, collapsed entirely.

== Rebuilding ==
Following the war the church was restored between 1946 and 1961 under the guidance of Berend Tobia Boeyinga, a Dutch architect noted for his Calvinist church buildings and as a practising member of the Amsterdam School of architecture.

The church is used for occasional religious services but is mainly a tourist attraction, specifically commemorating the bravery of the paratroopers of the Allied forces who attempted to isolate the Germans by capturing the bridge across the river Nederrijn.

In 1994 the municipality of Arnhem commissioned an elevator to be placed in the church tower. Visitors can pay a small fee and ride up the elevator past all of the array of bell and into the loft of the church, from where tourist binoculars or the naked eye can be used to survey a 360 degree view of the surrounding city.

Visitors can also take the final few steps inside the spire to climb to the very point of the tower. The church organ is still prominent and in good working order, and the church itself contains a number of items of interest and commemorative paraphernalia.

== Human remains ==
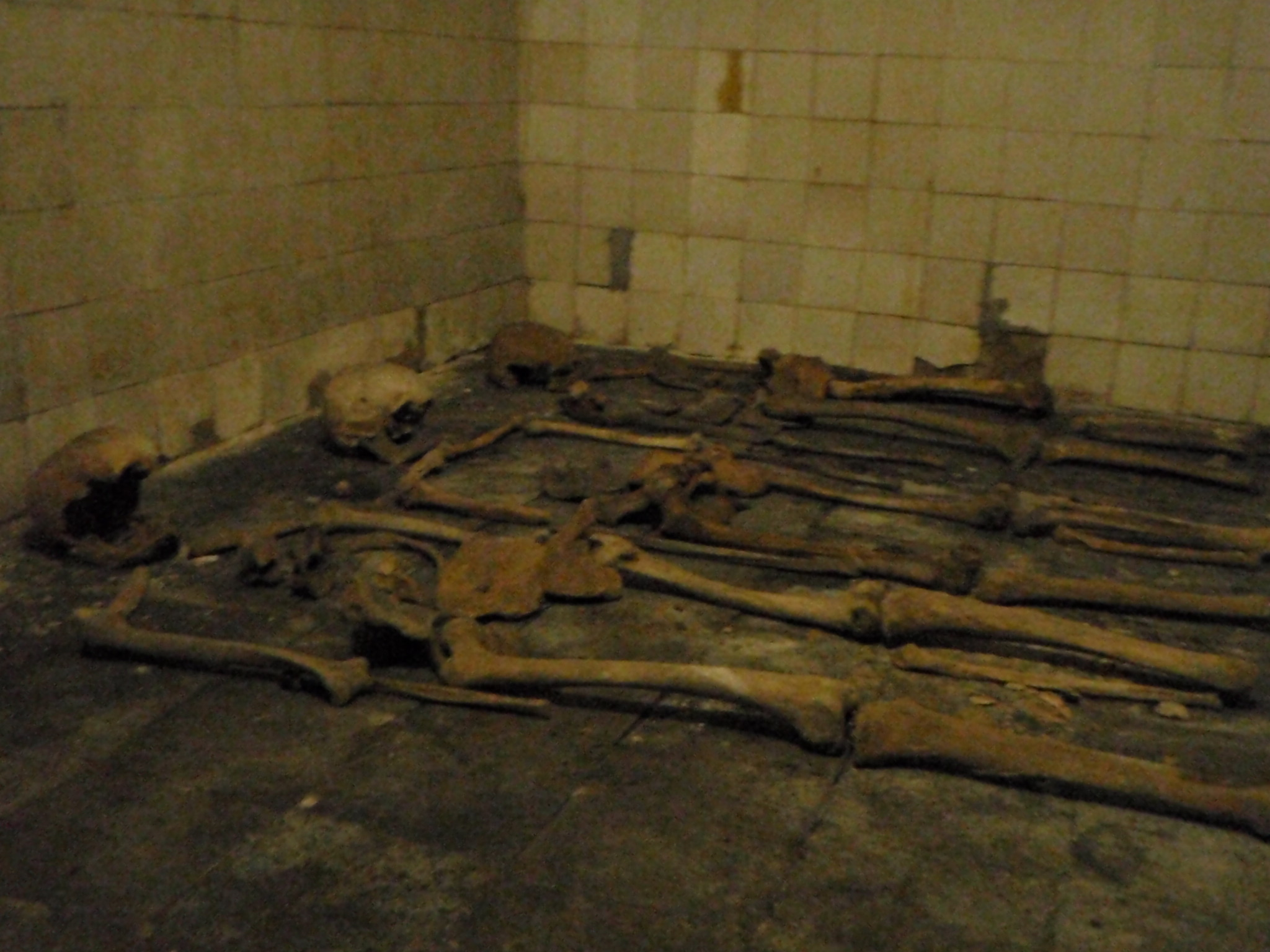
Some of the bones in the crypt

Visitors to the church are also able to enter the crypt below the building. This part of the building has only very dim light in a central part. By carefully exploring a number of darkened cavernous areas, most of which are either barred as if being a part of old gaol cells, or in some cases as clearly exhumed shallow graves, the visitor can find ancient human bones which have been left in the state of their burial or death.

== Gallery ==
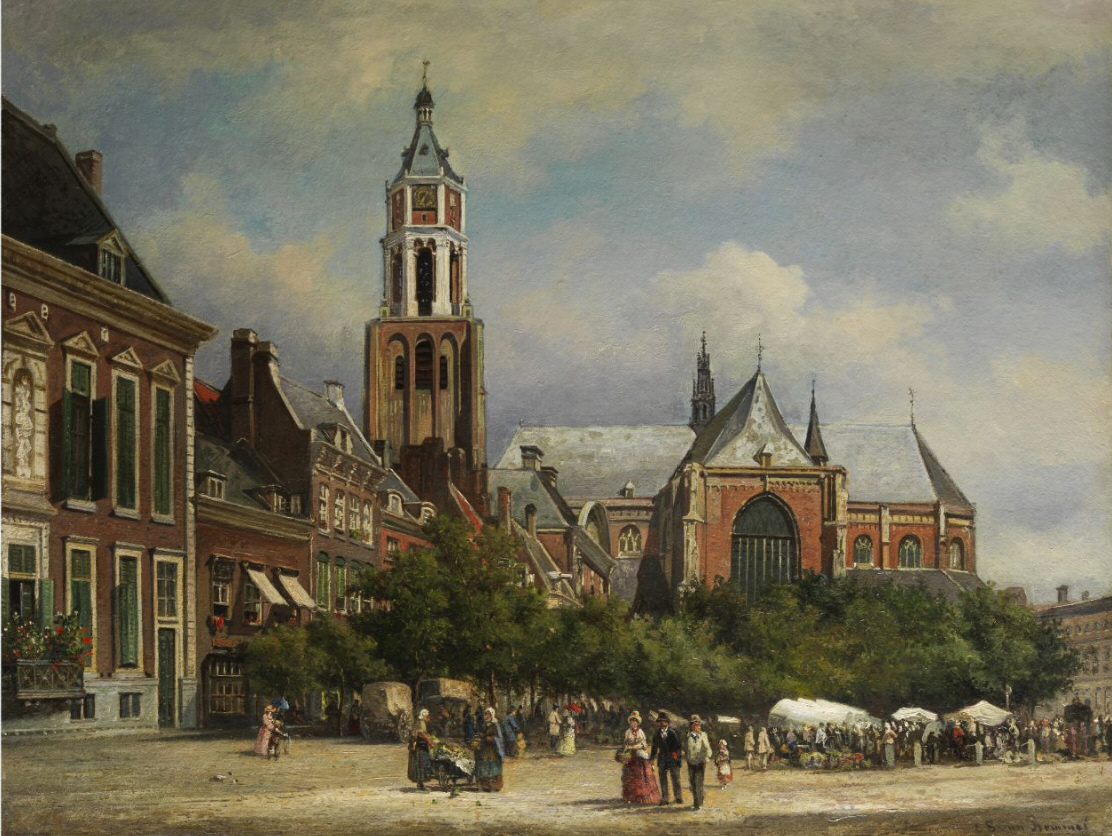
Church in 1884, Painting: Der Markt in Arnhem

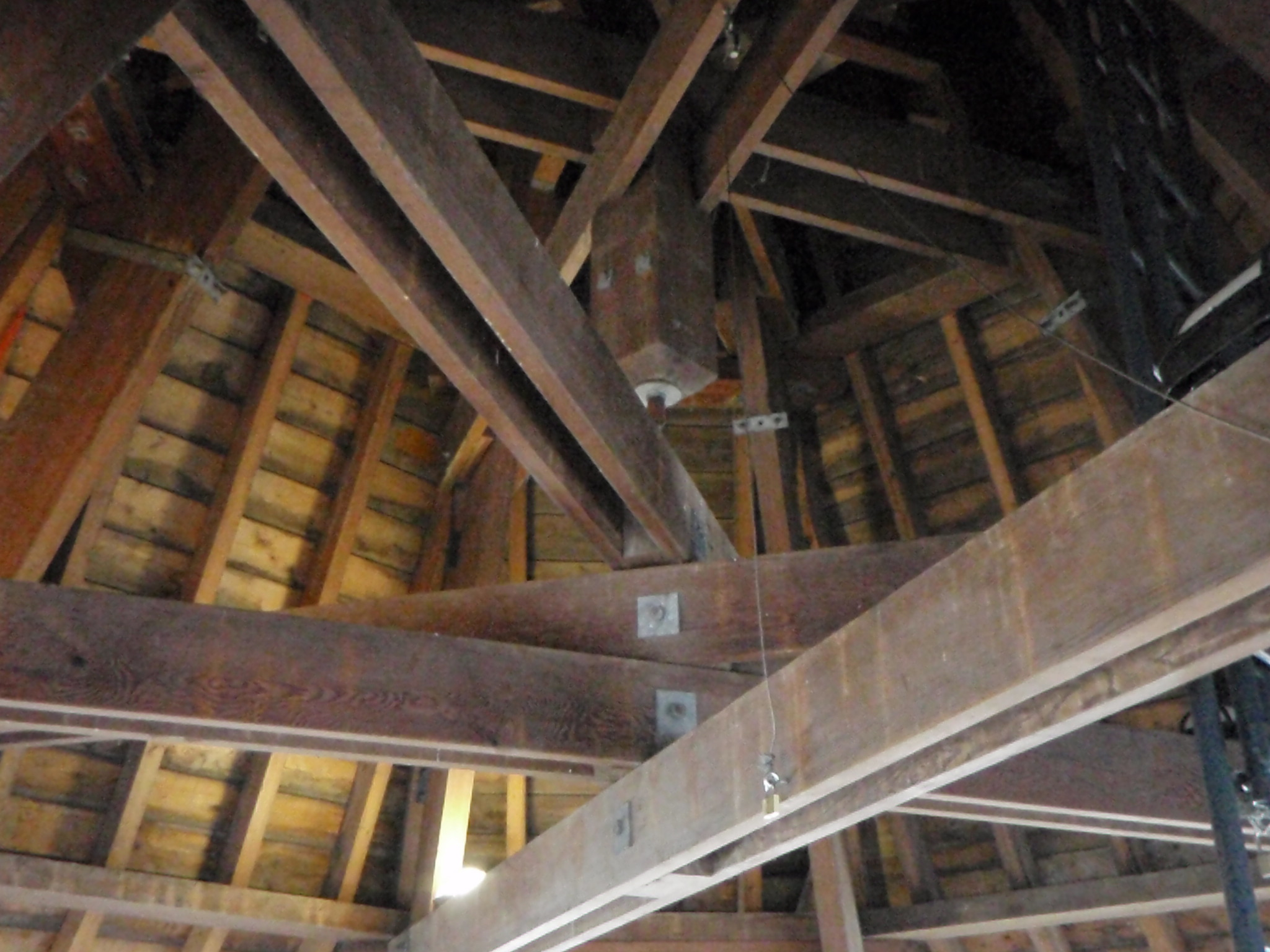
Inside spire.

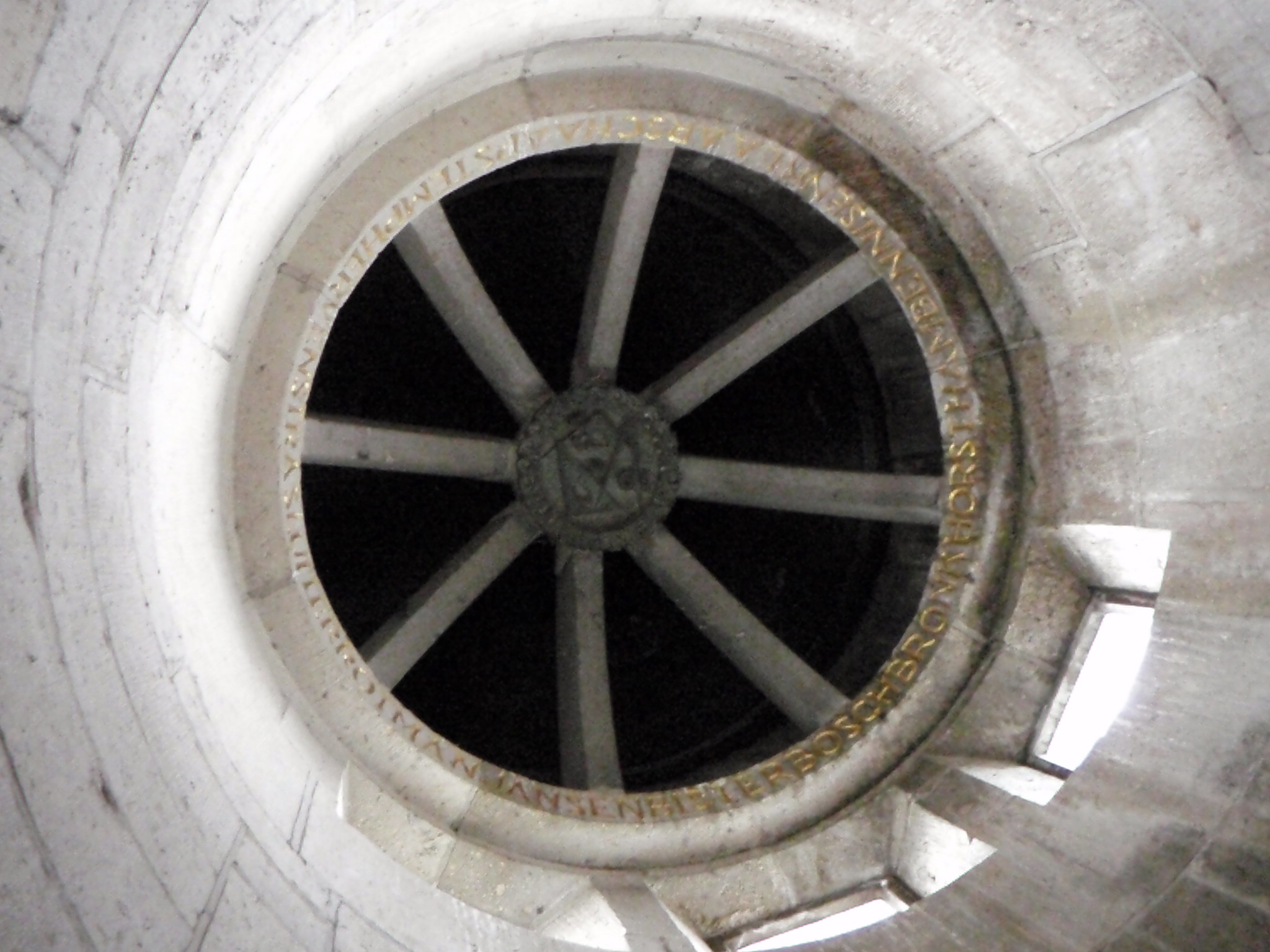
Roof of the final few steps towards the top of spire.

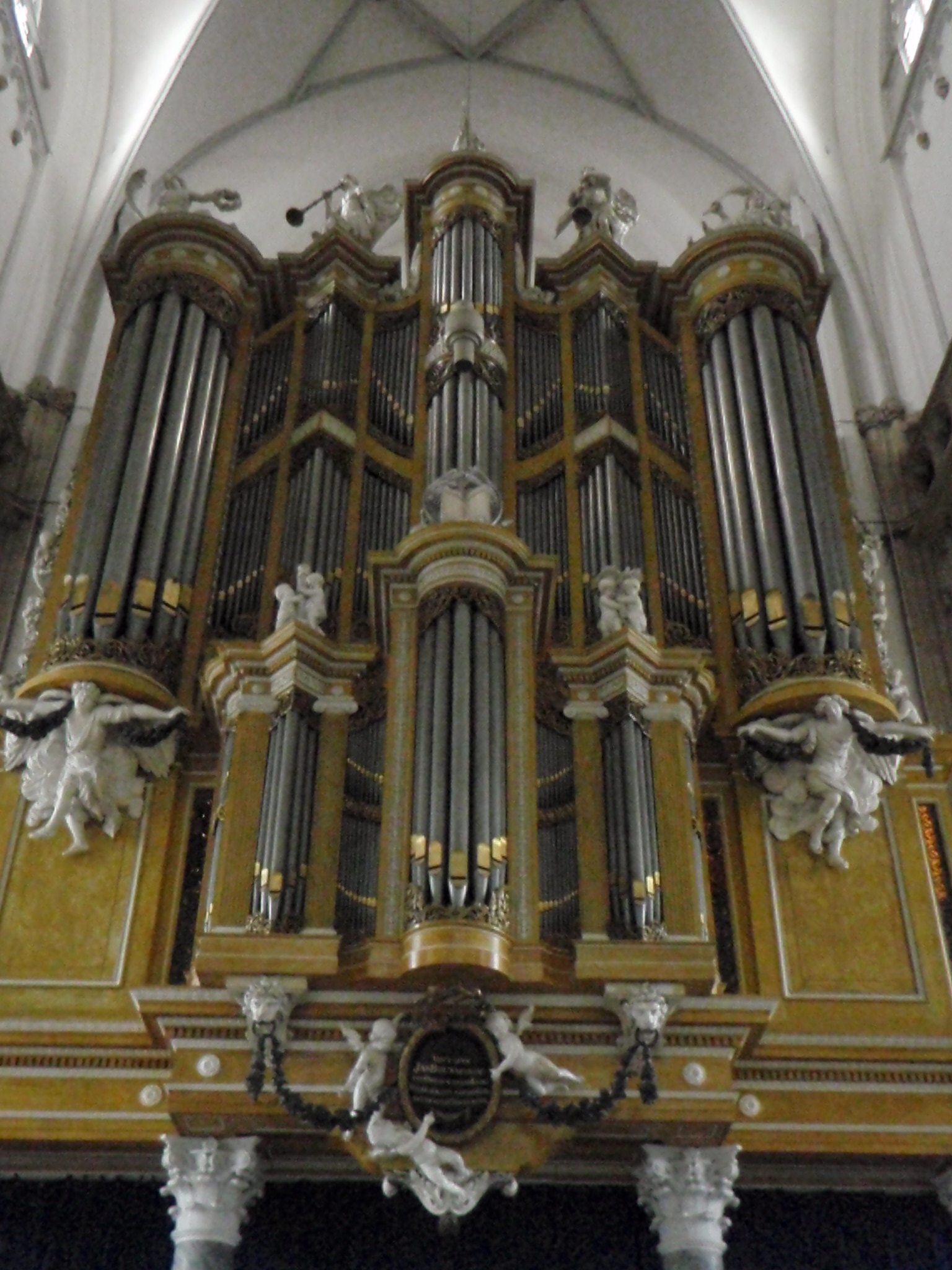
Main organ

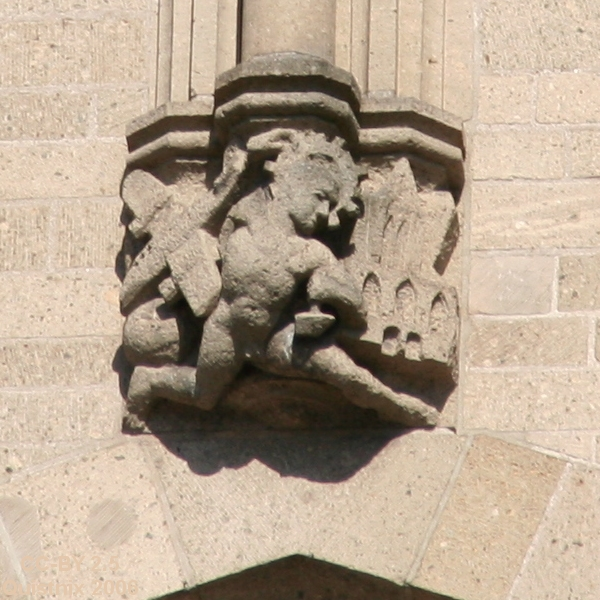
Detail on the outside of the building.

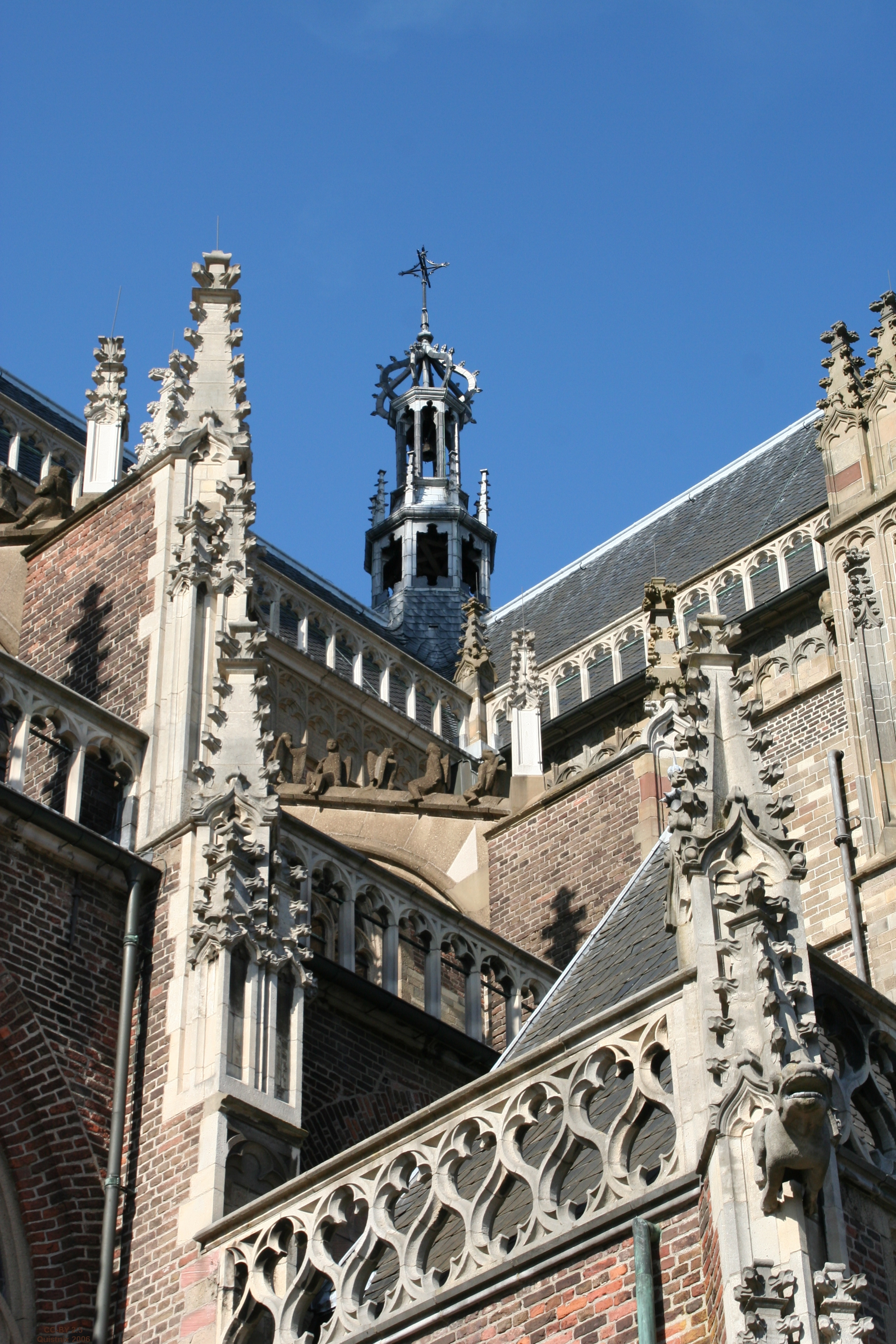
Various corners of the building.

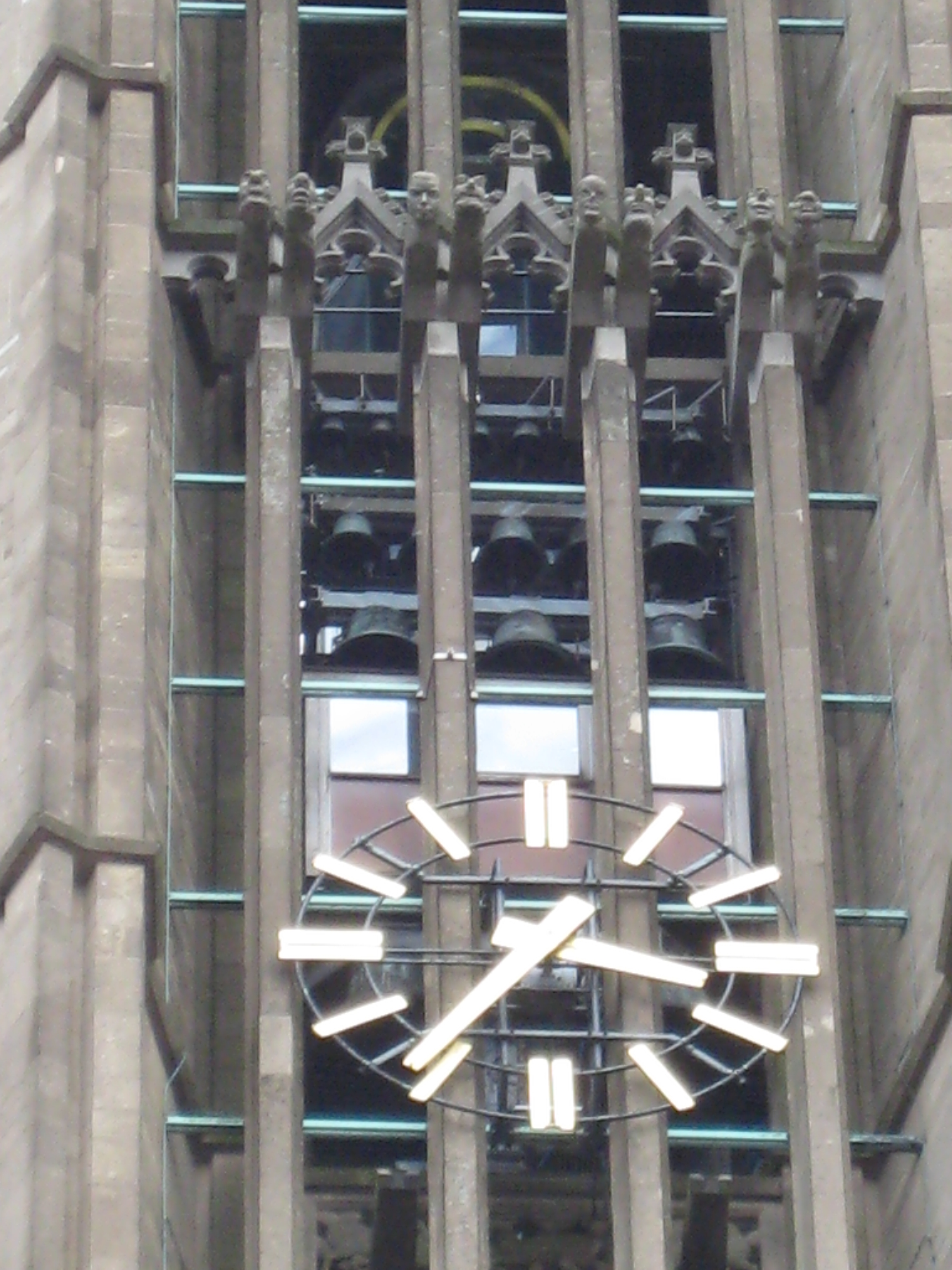
Dwarf gargoyles on the outside of the building

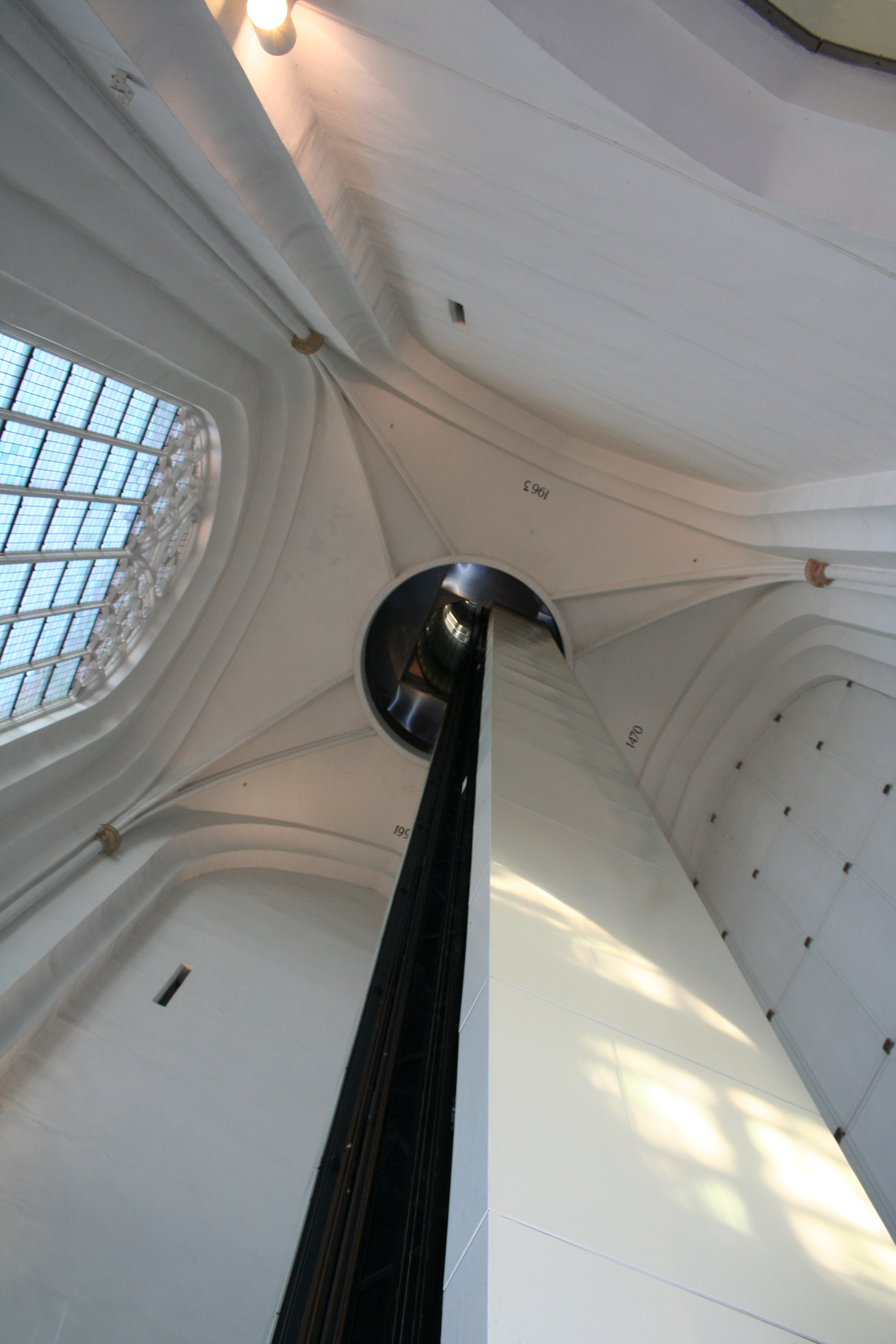
The lift inside the church tower

== Observation deck ==
Since 2018, the St Eusebius' Church has two glass observation balconies at a height of 59 and 62 meters

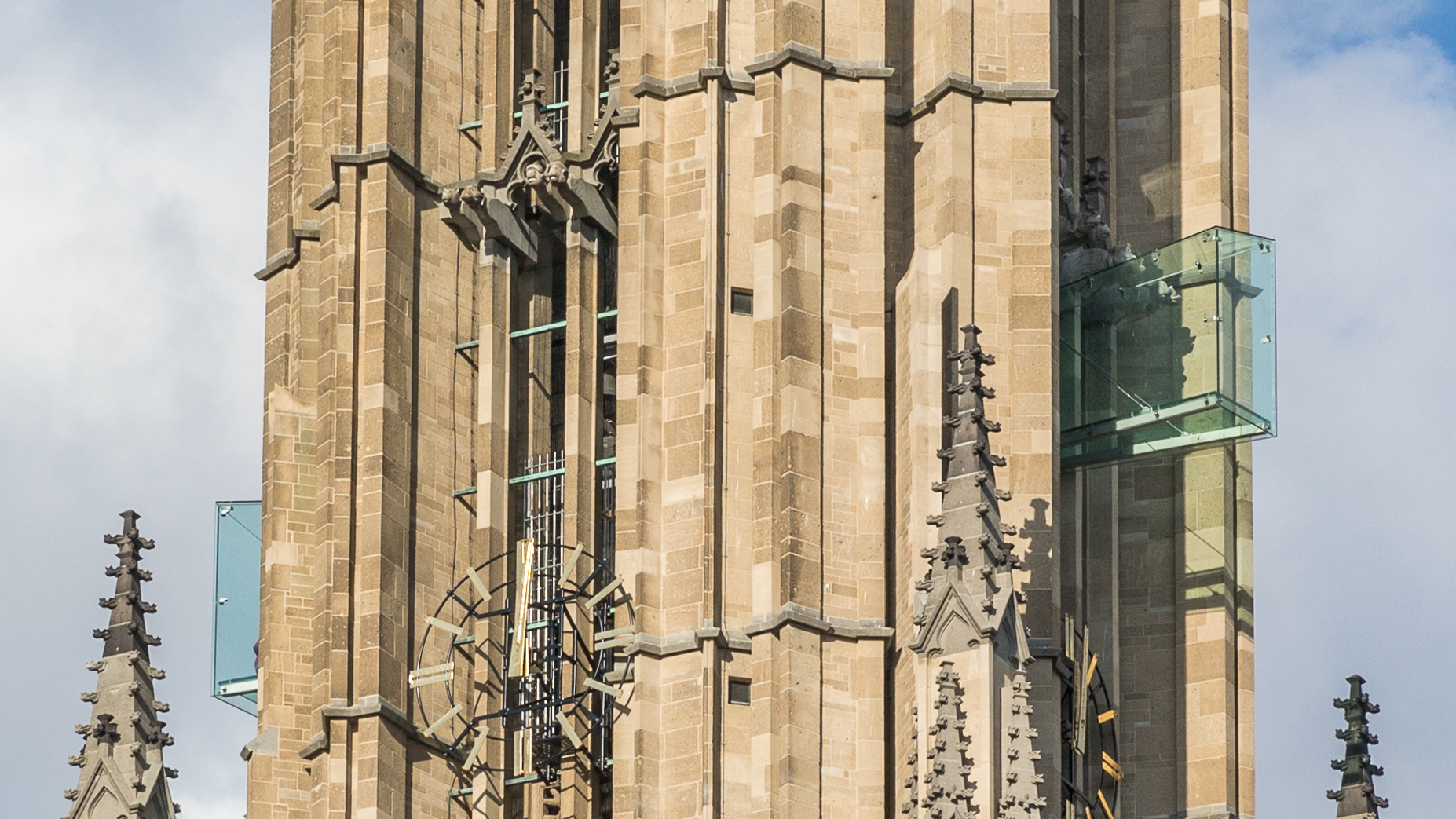
Exterior view

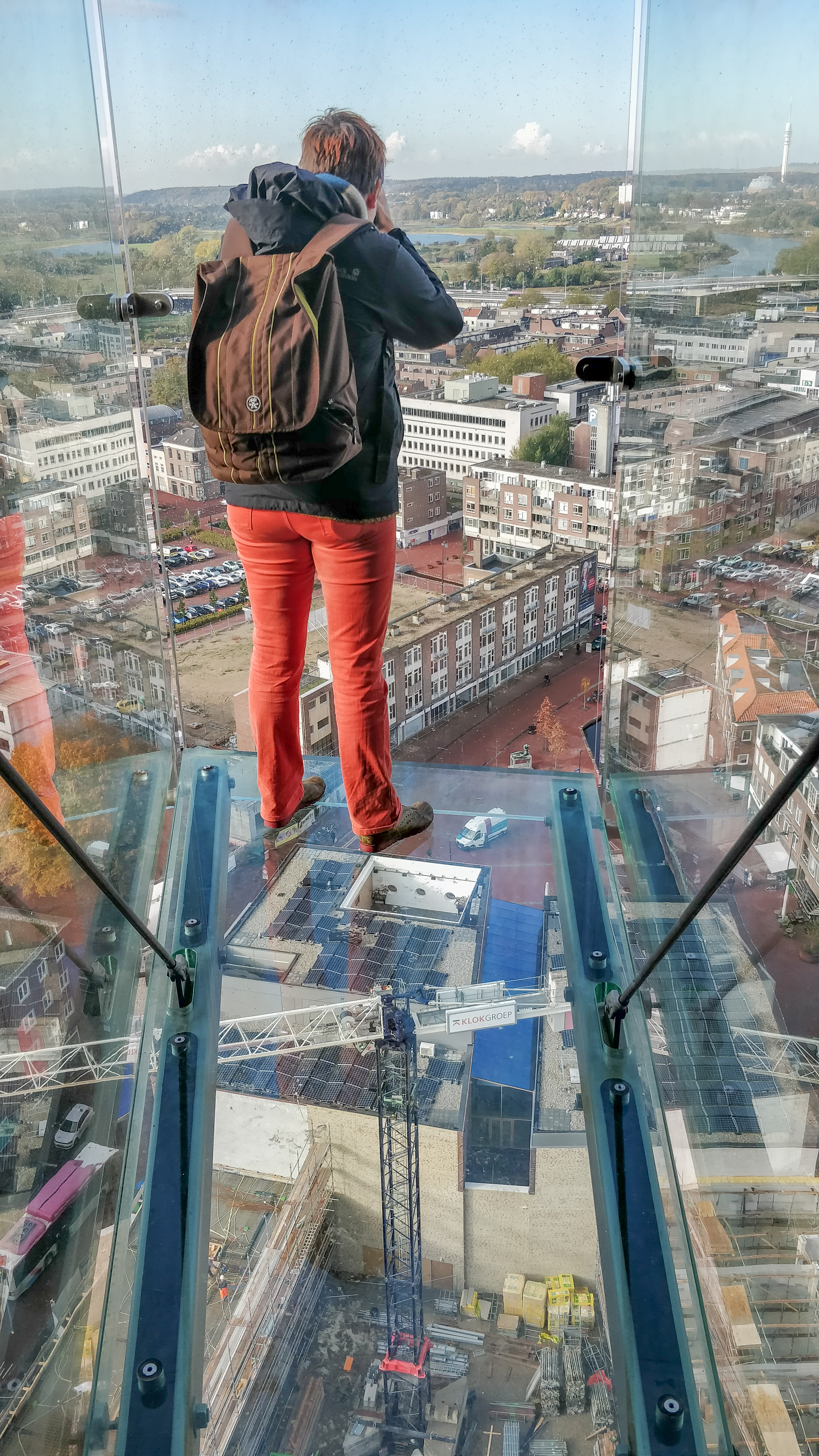
View from the observation balcony

== See also ==
- List of tallest structures built before the 20th century
