= Johann VI of Nassau-Dillenburg =

Count of Nassau-Dillenburg (1536–1606)

John VI, Count of Nassau-Dillenburg
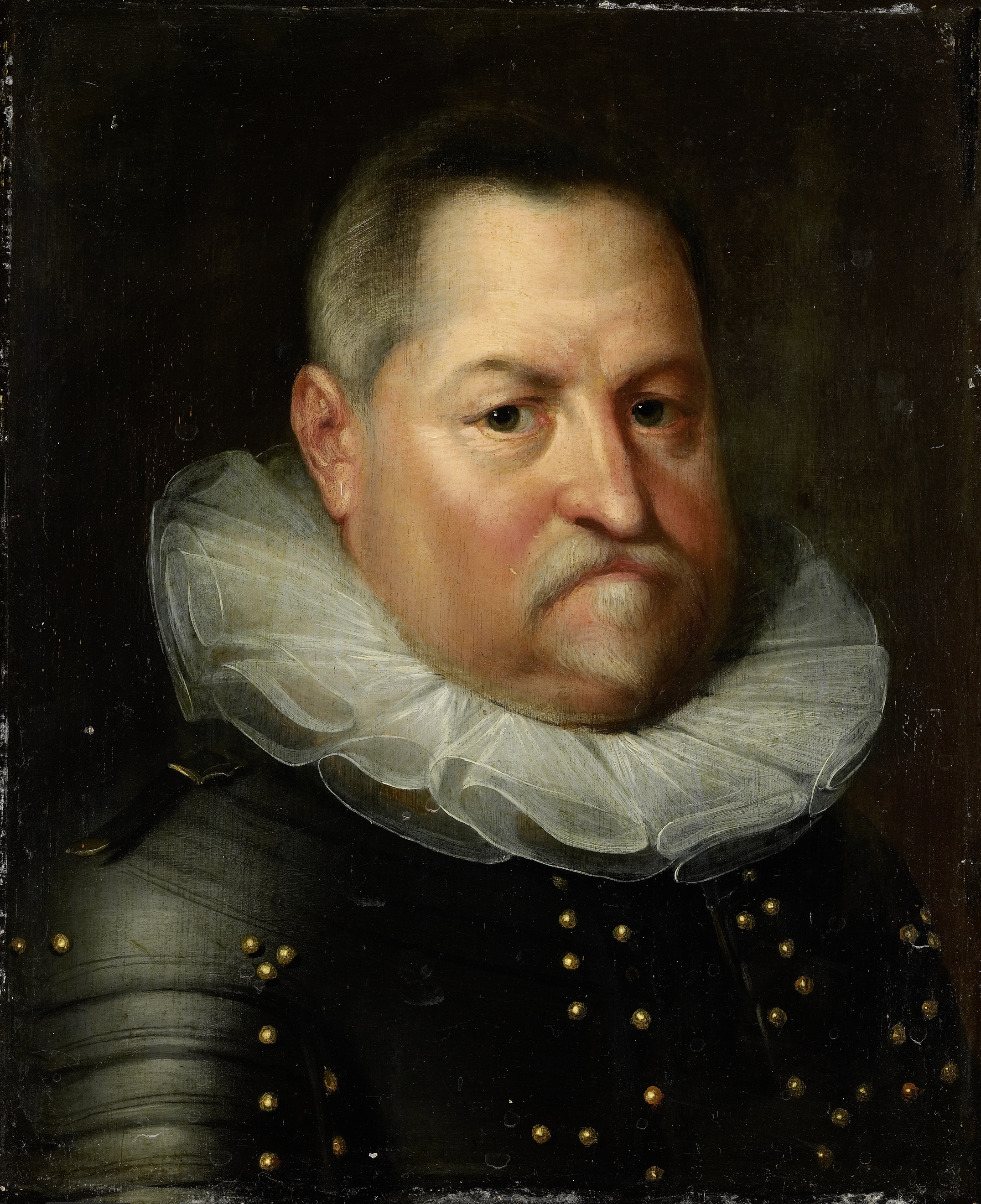
- John VI, Count of Nassau-Dillenburg
- Born: 22 November 1536; Dillenburg
- Died: 8 October 1606 (aged 69); Dillenburg
- Spouse: Elisabeth of Leuchtenberg (m. 1559; died 1579) Kunigunde Jakobäa of Simmern (m. 1580; died 1586) Johannetta of Sayn-Wittgenstein (m. 1586)
- Issue Detail: William Louis, Count of Nassau-Dillenburg; John VII, Count of Nassau-Siegen; George, Count of Nassau-Dillenburg; Elisabeth, Countess of Isenburg-Büdingen; Juliana, Countess of Solms-Braunfels; Philip of Nassau; Maria, Countess of Nassau-Wiesbaden-Idstein; Anna Sibylla of Nassau; Mathilde, Countess of Mansfeld-Arnstein; Ernest Casimir, Count of Nassau-Dietz; Louis Gunther of Nassau; Maria Amalia, Countess of Solms-Braunsfeld-Greiffenstein; John Louis, Prince of Nassau-Hadamar; Johannette Elisabeth, Countess of Bentheim-Limburg; Anna, Countess of Isenburg-Birstein; Magdalene, Countess of Erbach-Schönberg; Anna Amalie, Countess of Isenburg-Birstein
- House: Nassau
- Father: William I, Count of Nassau-Siegen
- Mother: Juliane of Stolberg-Wernigerode
- Religion: Calvinism

Count John VI of Nassau-Dillenburg (22 November 1536 – 8 October 1606) was the second son of William the Rich and the younger brother of William the Silent. He has a special place in the history of the Netherlands because he is the male-line forefather of the House of Orange.

John VI of Nassau-Dillenburg was a Count of Nassau in Dillenburg. Other names he had were Jan VI or Jan de Oude ("John the Elder", to distinguish him from his 2nd son, "John the Middle", and his grandson "John the Younger").

John VI was born in Dillenburg, the second son of Count William I of Nassau-Dillenburg and his second wife Juliane of Stolberg-Wernigerode and brother of William I of Orange. He was the principal author of the Union of Utrecht.

== Family and children ==
John VI was married three times and had a total of 24 children:

Firstly, he married on 16 June 1559 with Elisabeth of Leuchtenberg (ca. March 1537 – 6 July 1579), who bore him 13 children:

1. Count Willem Lodewijk "Us Heit" (13 March 1560 – 31 May 1620)
2. Count John VII (7 June 1561 – 27 September 1623)
3. Count George (1 September 1562 – 9 August 1623)
4. Elisabeth (24 January 1564 – 5 May 1611), married:
  1. on 3 October 1583 to Count Philip IV, Count of Nassau-Weilburg
  2. on 7 May 1603 to Count Wolfgang Ernst I of Isenburg-Büdingen
5. Juliana (6 October 1565 – 4 October 1630), married:
  1. on 24 April 1588 to Wild- and Rhinegrave Adolf Henry of Dhaun
  2. on 8 February 1619 to Count John Albrecht I of Solms-Braunfels
6. Philip (1 December 1566 – 3 September 1595)
7. Maria (12 November 1568 – 10 May 1625), married on 2 December 1588 to Count John Louis I of Nassau-Wiesbaden-Idstein
8. Anna Sibylla (29 September 1569 – 19 December 1576)
9. Mathilde (27 December 1570 – 10 May 1625), married on 24 June 1592 to Count Wilhelm V of Mansfeld-Arnstein
10. Albert (born and died in 1572)
11. Count Ernst Casimir of Nassau-Dietz (22 December 1573 – 2 June 1632). It is through Ernest Casimir that the royal family of the Netherlands are descended.
12. Louis Gunther (15 February 1575 – 12 September 1604)
13. Stillborn son (6 July 1579)

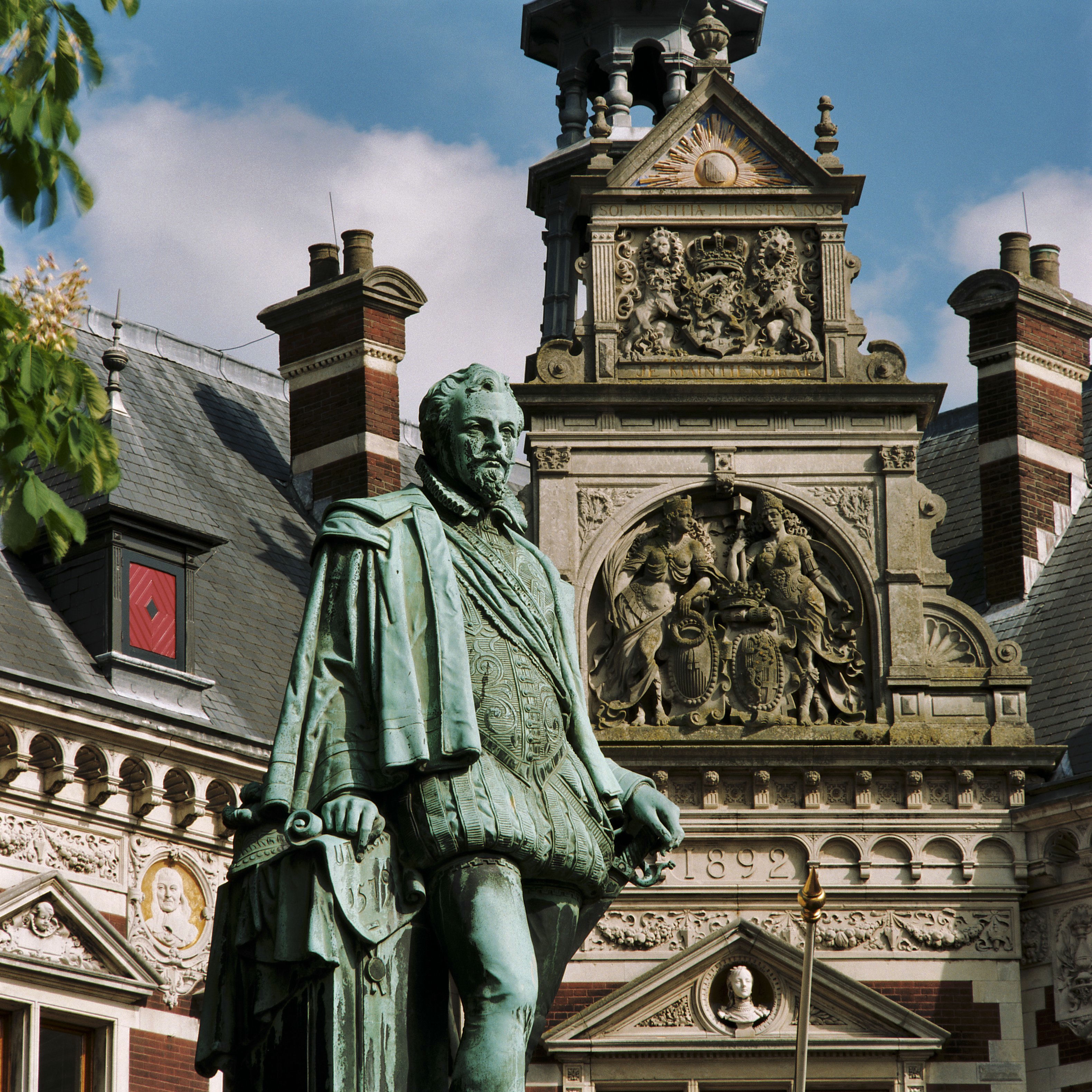
Statue of Johann VI in Utrecht.

Secondly, he married on 13 September 1580 with Kunigunde Jakobäa of Simmern (9 October 1556 – 26 January 1586), daughter of Frederick III, Elector Palatine, who bore him 4 children:

1. Stillborn son (19 July 1581)
2. Maria Amalia (27 July 1582 – 31 October 1635), married on 23 August 1600 to Count Wilhelm I of Solms-Braunsfeld-Greiffenstein
3. Kunigunde (12 July 1583 – 4 April 1584)
4. Stillborn son (23 February 1585)

Thirdly, he married on 14 June 1586 to Johannetta of Sayn-Wittgenstein (15 February 1561 – 13 April 1622), who bore him 7 children:

1. George Louis (12 April 1588 – 16 April 1588)
2. Prince John Louis of Nassau-Hadamar (6 August 1590 – 10 March 1653)
3. Johannette Elisabeth (13 February 1593 – 13 September 1654), married on 16 December 1616 to Count Conrad Gumprecht of Bentheim-Limburg, son of Arnold III, Count of Bentheim-Steinfurt-Tecklenburg-Limburg
4. Anna (24 November 1594 – 11 February 1660), married on 19 June 1619 to Count Philipp Ernst of Isenburg-Birstein
5. Magdalene (13 November 1595 – 31 July 1633), married on 29 May 1624 to Count Georg Albrecht I of Erbach
6. Anna Amalie (19 July 1599 – 4 May 1667), married on 25 November 1648 to Count Wilhelm Otto of Isenburg-Birstein
7. Juliane (9 June 1602 – 26 August 1602).

He died in his native city of Dillenburg, aged 69.

== Ancestry ==
Ancestors of Johann VI of Nassau-Dillenburg

8. John IV, Count of Nassau-Siegen
4. John V, Count of Nassau-Siegen
9. Maria of Looz-Heinsberg
2. William I, Count of Nassau-Siegen
10. Henry III, Landgrave of Hesse
5. Elisabeth of Hesse-Marburg
11. Anna of Katzenelnbogen
1. Johann VI, Count of Nassau-Dillenburg
12. Henry IX of Stolberg
6. Bodo III, Count of Stolberg-Wernigerode
13. Mathilde of Mansfeld
3. Juliana of Stolberg-Wernigerode
14. Philip I of Eppstein
7. Anna of Eppstein-Königstein
15. Louise de La Marck

Johann VI of Nassau-Dillenburg House of Nassau Born: 22 November 1536 Died: 8 October 1606
Preceded by William I	Count of Nassau-Dillenburg; 1559–1606	Succeeded by William Louis
Preceded by John III	Count of Nassau-Beilstein; 1561–1606	Succeeded by William Louis
