= Louis Günther of Nassau =

Count of Nassau-Katzenelnbogen

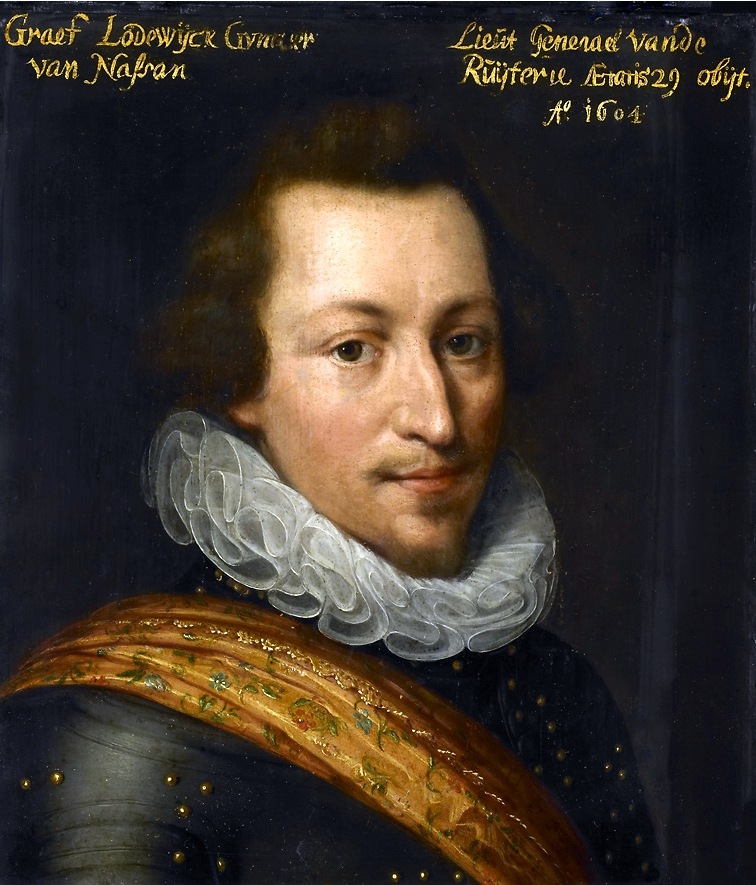
- Portrait of Louis Günther of Nassau
- Born: 15 February 1575; Dillenburg
- Died: 12 September 1604 (aged 29) outside Sluis
- Noble family: House of Nassau
- Spouse: Anna Margareta of Manderscheid-Gerolstein
- Father: John VI, Count of Nassau-Dillenburg
- Mother: Elisabeth of Leuchtenberg

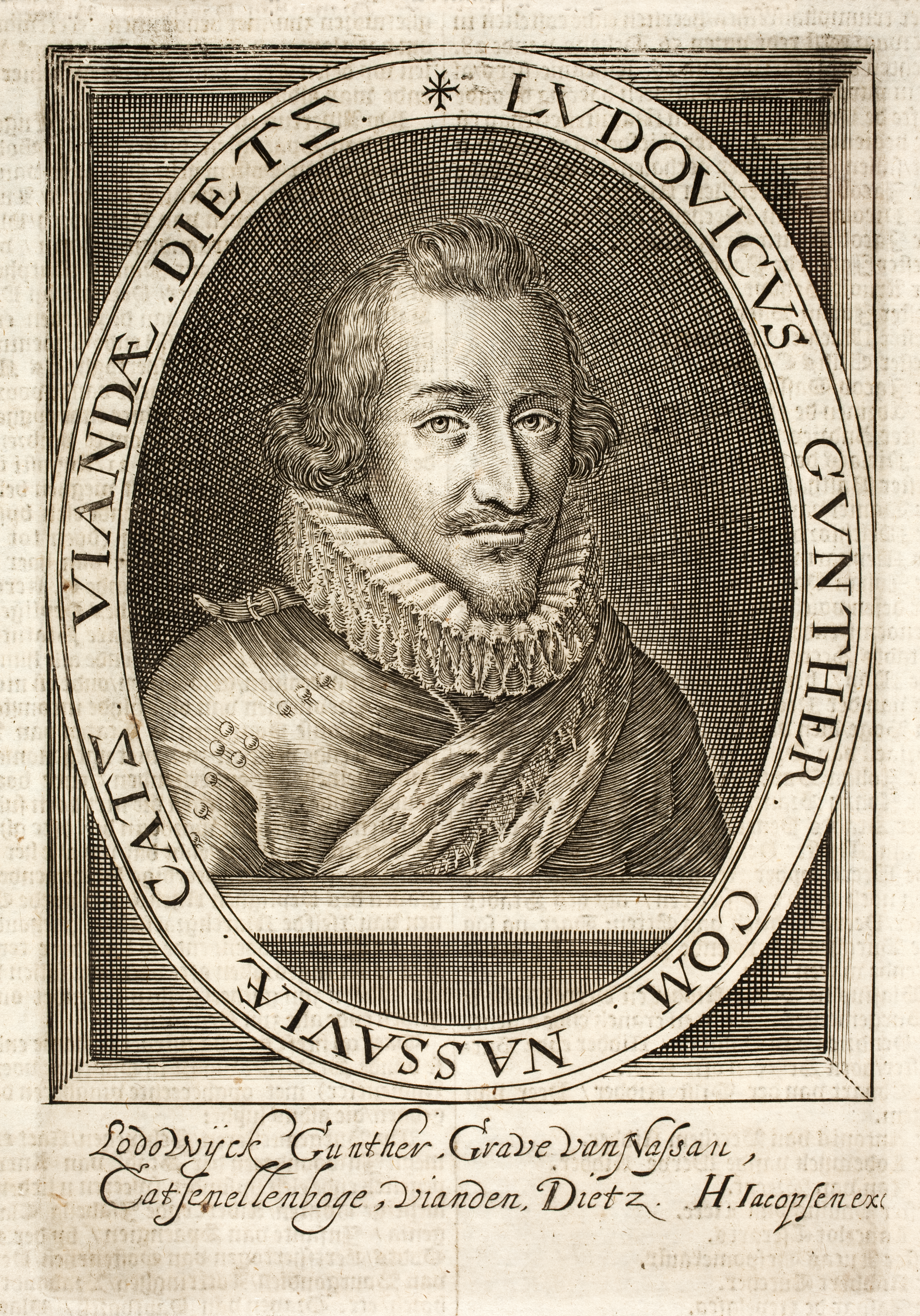
Engraving of Louis Günther of Nassau

Count Louis Günther of Nassau (15 February 1575 – 12 September 1604) was a Count of Nassau-Katzenelnbogen and a Dutch lieutenant general of cavalry in the Eighty Years' War.

He was the thirteenth and youngest child of John VI of Nassau and his first wife Elisabeth of Leuchtenberg (1537–1579).

He studied in Switzerland and then, like many of his brothers, he joined the Ducht army. He fought under his brother William Louis and his cousin Maurice. In 1596 he participated as a volunteer in the Capture of Cádiz. His cousin appointed him to lieutenant general in 1600 and he excelled in the Battle of Nieuwpoort. He then managed to take Wachtendonk. In 1602 he led an attack on Luxembourg. In 1604 he took part in the siege of Sluis, where he died of a fever.

He married on 7 June 1601 with Countess Anna Margareta of Manderscheid-Gerolstein (1575–1606). Anna Margareta was the daughter of Count John Gerhard of Manderscheid-Gerolstein and the widow of Wirich VI, Count of Daun-Falkenstein. The marriage remained childless.
