= William Louis, Count of Nassau-Dillenburg =

European nobel (1560–1620)

William Louis
- Count of Nassau-Dillenburg
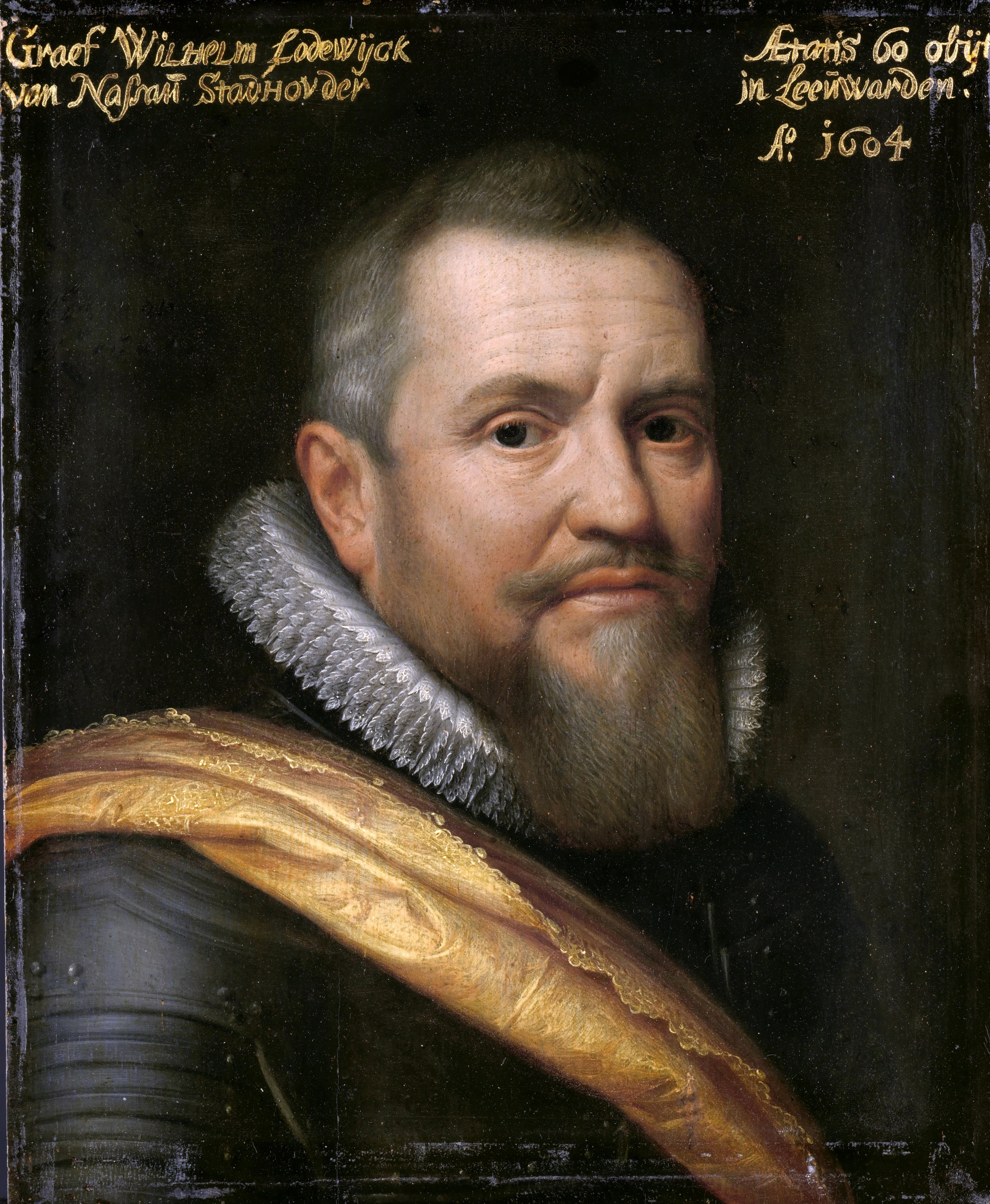
- Born: 13 March 1560; Dillenburg
- Died: 13 July 1620 (aged 60); Stadhouderlijk Hof in Leeuwarden
- Buried: Grote or Jacobijnerkerk in Leeuwarden
- Noble family: Nassau
- Spouse: Anna of Nassau
- Father: Johann VI, Count of Nassau-Dillenburg
- Mother: Countess Elisabeth of Leuchtenberg

William Louis of Nassau-Dillenburg (Dutch: Willem Lodewijk; West Frisian: Willem Loadewyk; 13 March 1560, Dillenburg, Hesse – 13 July 1620, Leeuwarden, Netherlands) was Count of Nassau-Dillenburg from 1606 to 1620, and stadtholder of Friesland, Groningen, and Drenthe.

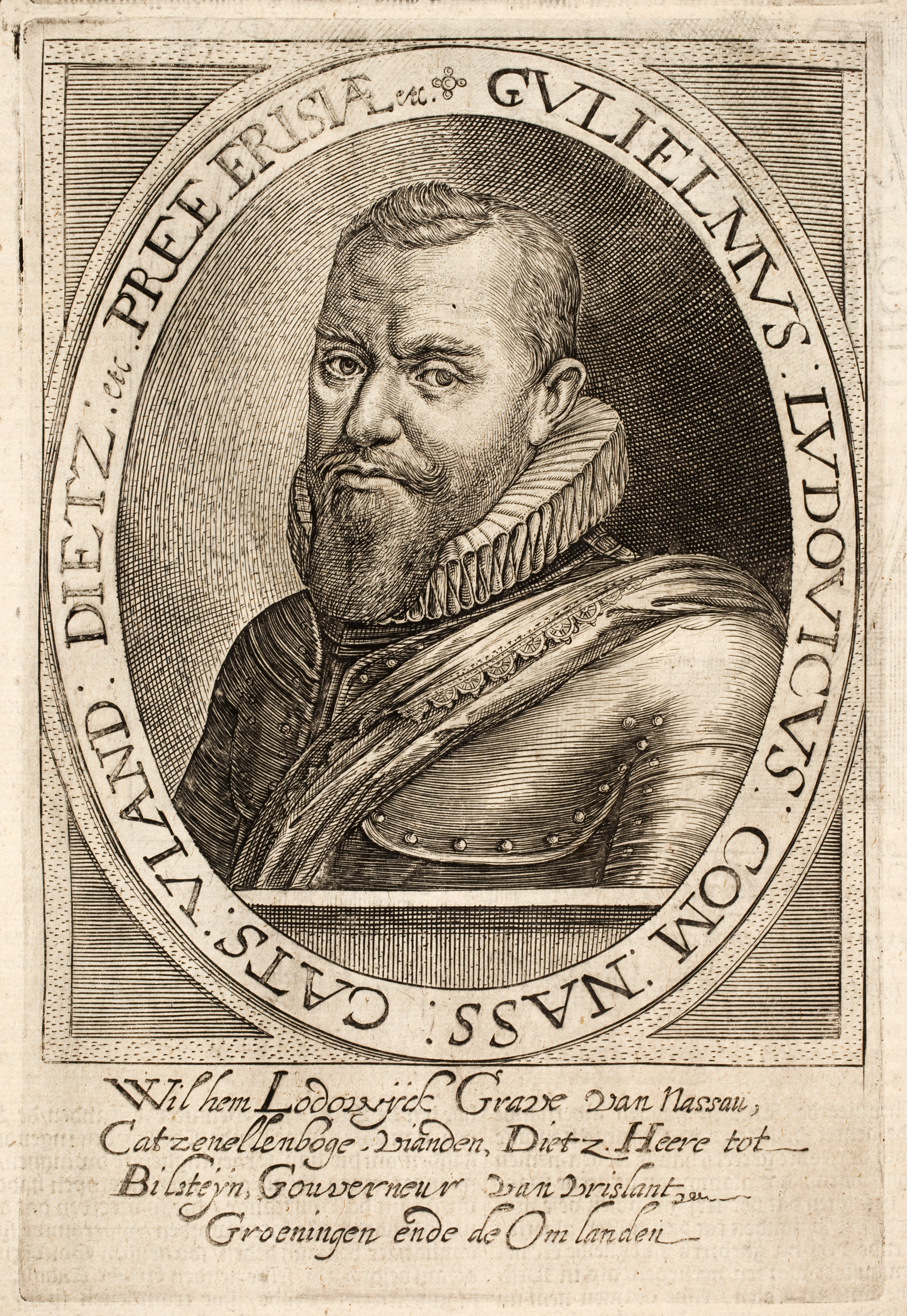
Engraving of William Louis

== Life ==
William Louis was the eldest son of John VI, Count of Nassau-Dillenburg and his first wife, Elisabeth of Leuchtenberg.

He served as a cavalry officer under William the Silent. Together with his cousin (and brother-in-law) Maurice of Nassau, Prince of Orange, he commanded the Dutch States Army and helped plan the military strategy of the Dutch Republic against Spain from 1588 to 1609.

William Louis played a significant part in the Military Revolution of the 16th–17th centuries. In a letter to his cousin Maurice of Nassau, Prince of Orange which he composed on 8 December 1594, he set out (from reading Aelianus Tacticus) an argument based on the use of ranks by soldiers of Imperial Rome as discussed in Aelian's Tactica. Aelian was discussing the use of the counter march in the context of the Roman sword gladius and spear pilium. William Louis in a 'crucial leap' realized that the same technique could work for men with firearms.

" I have discovered evolutionibus [a term that would eventually be translated as "drill"] a method of getting the musketeers and others with guns not only to practice firing but to keep on doing so in a very effective battle order (that is to say, they do not fire at will or from behind a barrier ... .). Just as soon as the first rank has fired, then by the drill [they have learned] they will march to the back. The second rank either marching forward or standing still, will then fire just like the first. After that the third and following ranks will do the same. When the last rank has fired, the first will have reloaded, as the following diagram shows ... .

On 25 November 1587, he married his cousin, Anna of Nassau, daughter of William the Silent and Anna of Saxony, and older sister of Maurice of Nassau. Anna died less than six months later on 13 June 1588, and William Louis never remarried.

He was nicknamed "Us Heit" (West Frisian for "our father"). He died in his home, the Stadhouderlijk hof in Leeuwarden, the city which honored him with a statue on the government square. His body was laid to rest in the Grote or Jacobijnerkerk.

== Ancestors ==
Ancestors of William Louis, Count of Nassau-Dillenburg

16. John IV, Count of Nassau-Siegen
8. John V, Count of Nassau-Siegen
17. Mary of Looz-Heinsberg
4. William I, Count of Nassau-Siegen
18. Henry III, Landgrave of Upper Hesse
9. Elisabeth of Hesse-Marburg
19. Anna of Katzenelnbogen
2. John VI, Count of Nassau-Dillenburg
20. Henry IX of Stolberg
10. Bodo III, Count of Stolberg-Wernigerode
21. Matilda of Mansfeld
5. Juliana of Stolberg
22. Philip I of Eppstein-Königstein
11. Anna of Eppstein-Königstein
23. Louise de la Marck
1. William Louis, Count of Nassau-Dillenburg
24. Frederick V of Leuchtenberg
12. John IV, Landgrave of Leuchtenberg
25. Dorothea of Rieneck
6. George III, Landgrave of Leuchtenberg
26. Günther XXXVIII, Count of Schwarzburg
13. Margaret of Schwarzburg
27. Catherine of Querfurt
3. Countess Elisabeth of Leuchtenberg
28. Albert III, Margrave of Brandenburg
14. Frederick I, Margrave of Brandenburg-Ansbach
29. Anna of Saxony
7. Barbara of Brandenburg-Ansbach-Kulmbach
30. Casimir IV Jagiellon
15. Sophia Jagiellon
31. Elizabeth of Austria

William Louis, Count of Nassau-Dillenburg House of Nassau Born: 21 January 1560 Died: 13 July 1620
Political offices
Preceded by William the Silent	Republican Stadtholder of Friesland; 1584–1620	Succeeded by Ernst Casimir
Regnal titles
Preceded by John VI	Count of Nassau-Dillenburg; 1606–1620	Succeeded by George
