= Juliana of Stolberg =

German countess (1506–1580)

- Countess of Stolberg-Wernigerode; Countess of Hanau-Münzenberg; Countess of Nassau-Siegen
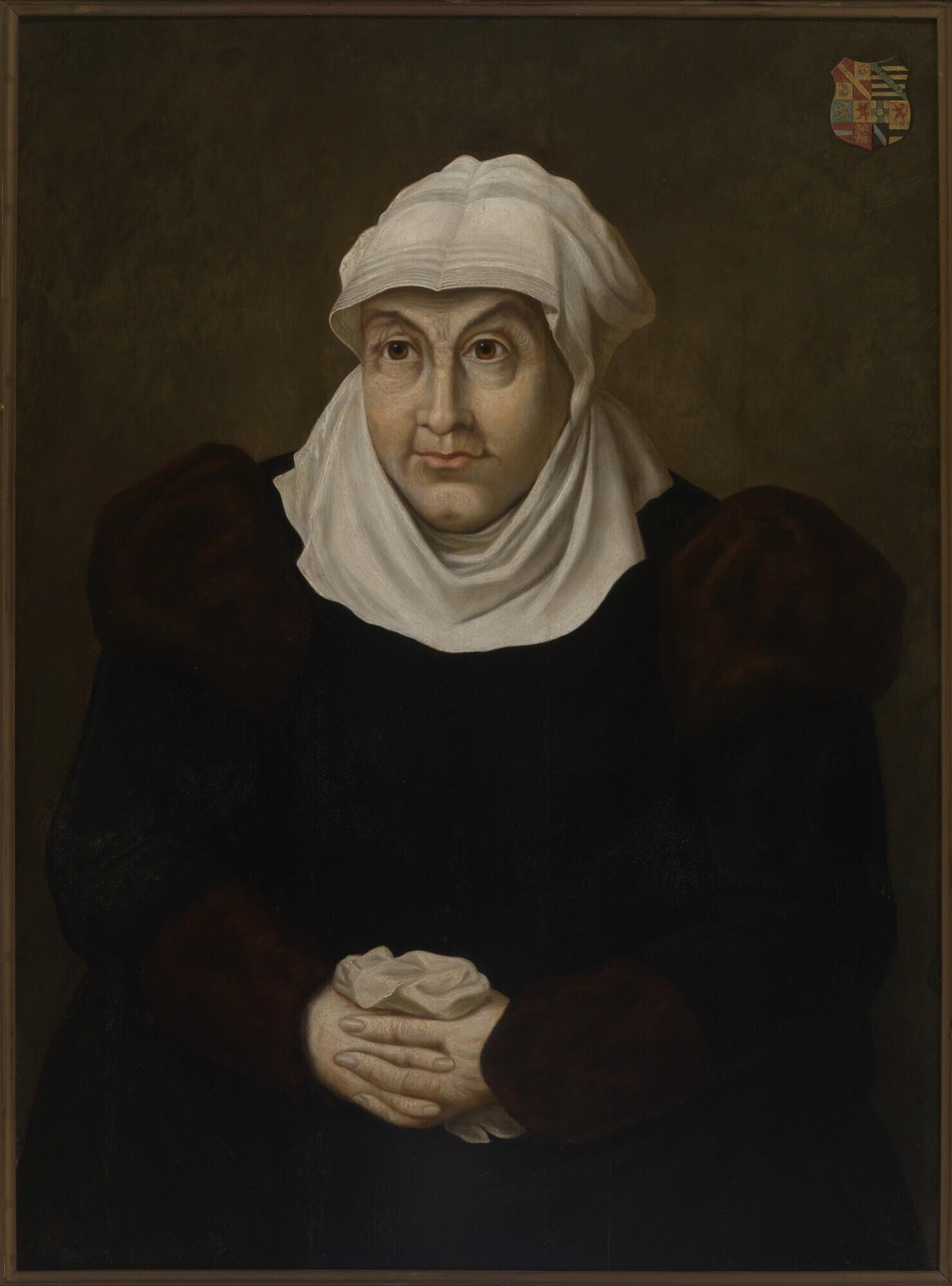
- Juliana, Countess of Stolberg-Wernigerode (1506–1580)
- Born: 15 February 1506; Stolberg, Saxony-Anhalt
- Died: 18 June 1580 (aged 74)
- Noble family: House of Stolberg
- Spouses: Philip II, Count of Hanau-Münzenberg (m. 1523; died 1529) William I, Count of Nassau-Siegen (m. 1531; died 1559)
- Issue Detail: Katharina, Countess of Wied-Runkel; Philipp III, Count of Hanau-Münzenberg; Reinhard of Hanau-Münzenberg; Juliana, Countess of Salm-Kyrburg; William I, Prince of Orange; John VI, Count of Nassau-Dillenburg; Louis of Nassau; Maria, Countess of Berg; Adolf of Nassau; Anna, Countess of Nassau-Weilburg; Elisabeth, Countess of Solms-Braunfels; Catherine, Countess of Schwarzburg-Arnstadt; Juliane, Countess of Schwarzburg-Rudolstadt; Magdalena, Countess of Hohenlohe-Weikersheim; Henry of Nassau
- Father: Bodo VIII, Count of Stolberg-Wernigerode
- Mother: Anna of Eppstein-Königstein

Juliana, Countess of Stolberg-Wernigerode (15 February 1506 in Stolberg, Saxony-Anhalt – 18 June 1580) was the mother of William the Silent, the leader of the successful Dutch Revolt against the Spanish in the 16th century.

== Early life and ancestry ==
Juliana was born in Stolberg into the House of Stolberg as a daughter of Bodo VIII, Count of Stolberg-Wernigerode and his wife, Countess Anna of Eppstein-Königstein.

== Biography ==
She was raised a Roman Catholic but changed her religion twice, first to Lutheranism and later to Calvinism. She, along with her second husband, was a convinced Protestant and raised their children in the Protestant ways. After the death of her second husband in 1559, she continued living at Dillenburg castle, which now belonged to her second son John, who died in 1580.

She kept close to her children throughout her life, especially William. When William began his rebellion against Philip II of Spain, Juliana supported her son both morally and financially. Because of this financial support, William was able to campaign against Spain in the Netherlands.

A fictionalized account of her life is found in Ethel Herr, Dr. Oma: The Healing Wisdom of Countess Juliana Von Stolberg (P&R Publishing, 2006).

== Marriages and children ==
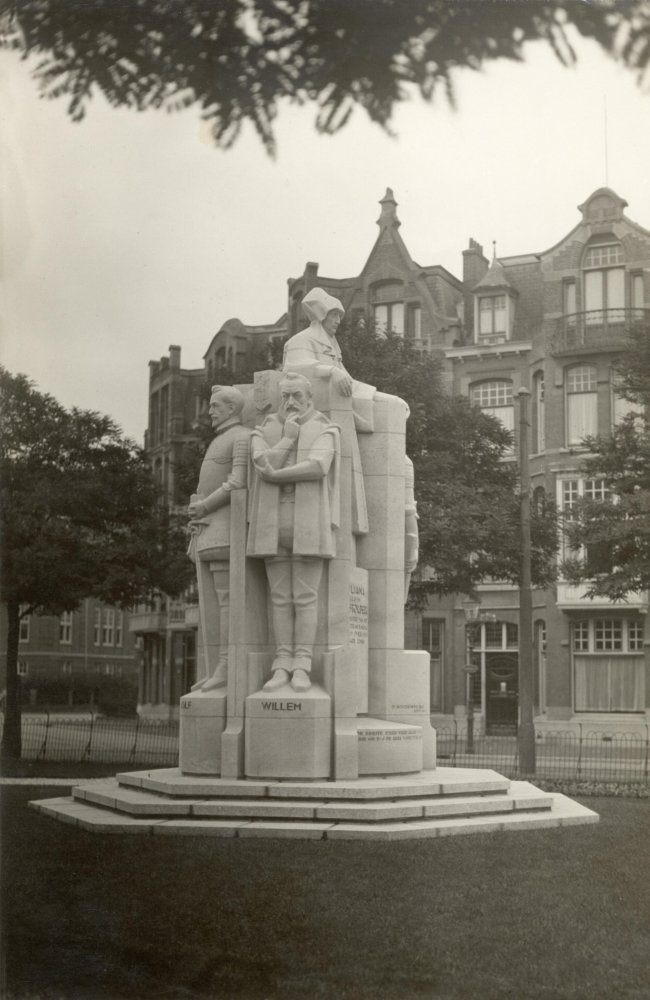
Monument of Juliana of Stolberg and her five sons in Bezuidenhout

In 1523, Juliana married Philip II of Hanau-Münzenberg (d. 1529). From this marriage, five children were born in just under six years:

1. Reinhard (born: 10 April 1524; died 12 April 1524)
2. Catherine (born: 26 March 1525; died 20 August 1581), married John IV, Count of Wied-Runkel and Isenburg
3. Philip III (1526–1561), Count of Hanau-Münzenberg
4. Reinhard (born: 8 April 1528; died: 11 October 1554), halfbrother of William of Orange, he died in battle in service of the army of Charles V in the war against France.
5. Juliana (born: 30 March 1529; died: 8 July 1595), married Thomas, Wild- and Rhinegrave of Salm-Kyrburg (1529–1549)

On 20 September 1531 Juliana married William I, Count of Nassau-Siegen. From this marriage, twelve children were born in eighteen years:

1. William I of Orange (1533–1584),
2. Hermanna (1534 – † young)
3. John VI "the Elder" (1536–1606)
4. Louis of Nassau (1538–1574)
5. Maria (1539–1599) She married William IV, Count of Berg
6. Adolf (1540–1568)
7. Anna (1541–1616). She married Albert of Nassau-Weilburg
8. Elisabeth (1542–1603). She married Conrad of Conrad, Count of Solms-Braunfels
9. Catherine (1543–1624). She married Count Günther XLI of Schwarzburg-Arnstadt
10. Juliana (1546–1588). She married Count Albrecht VII of Schwarzburg-Rudolstadt
11. Magdalena (1547–1633). She married Count Wolfgang of Hohenlohe-Weikersheim
12. Henry (1550–1574)

Juliana of Stolberg had in total 17 children and 123 grandchildren.
