= Walburga of Egmont =

Dutch countess (c. 1489–1529)

- Countess Consort of Nassau-Siegen
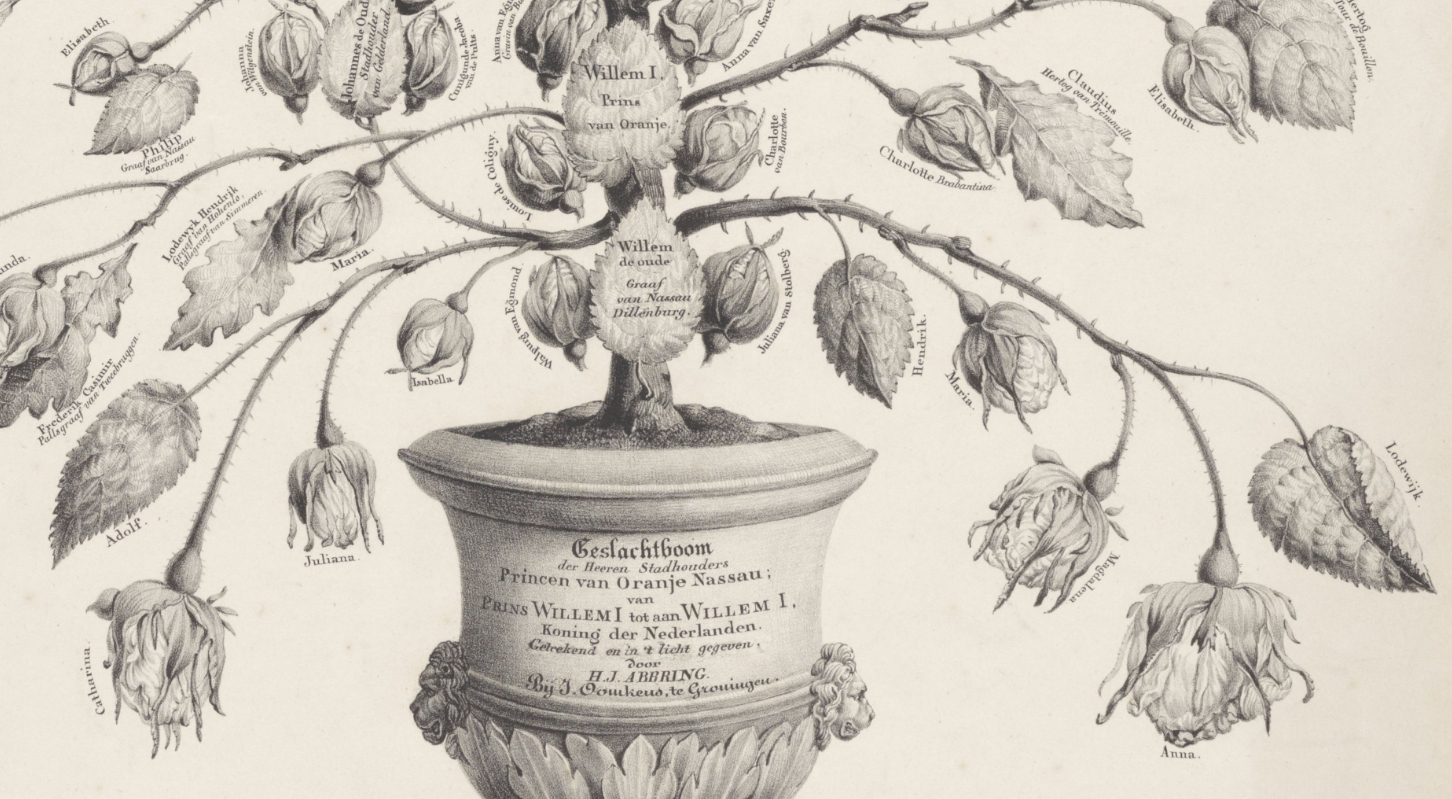
- Walburga of Egmont in the tree of the House of Orange-Nassau, c. 1813–1844.

- Coat of arms
- Full name: Walburga Countess of Egmont
- Native name: Walburga Gravin van Egmont
- Born: c. 1489
- Died: 7 March 1529
- Buried: St. John's Church, Franciscan monastery, Siegen; Reburied: St. Mary's Church, Siegen 1836
- Noble family: House of Egmond
- Spouse: William I of Nassau-Siegen
- Issue Detail: Elisabeth; Magdalene
- Father: John III of Egmont
- Mother: Magdalene of Werdenberg

Countess Walburga (Note: Given name in accordance with Lück (1981), p. 41 and Dek (1970), p. 72 and Van Stipriaan, René (2021). De Zwijger. Het leven van Willem van Oranje (in Dutch) (7th ed.). Amsterdam & Antwerpen: Querido Facto. p. 20. ISBN 978-90-214-0275-8. The given name Walburgis in Van Ditzhuyzen (2004), p. 249 and Schutte (1979), p. 43, Walpurgis in Becker (1983), p. 55, Walburgia in Dek (1968), p. 228, and Walburg in Vorsterman van Oyen (1882), p. 98.) of Egmont (c. 1489 – 7 March 1529), Dutch: Walburga Gravin van Egmont, was a countess from the House of Egmond and through marriage Countess of Nassau-Siegen.

== Biography ==
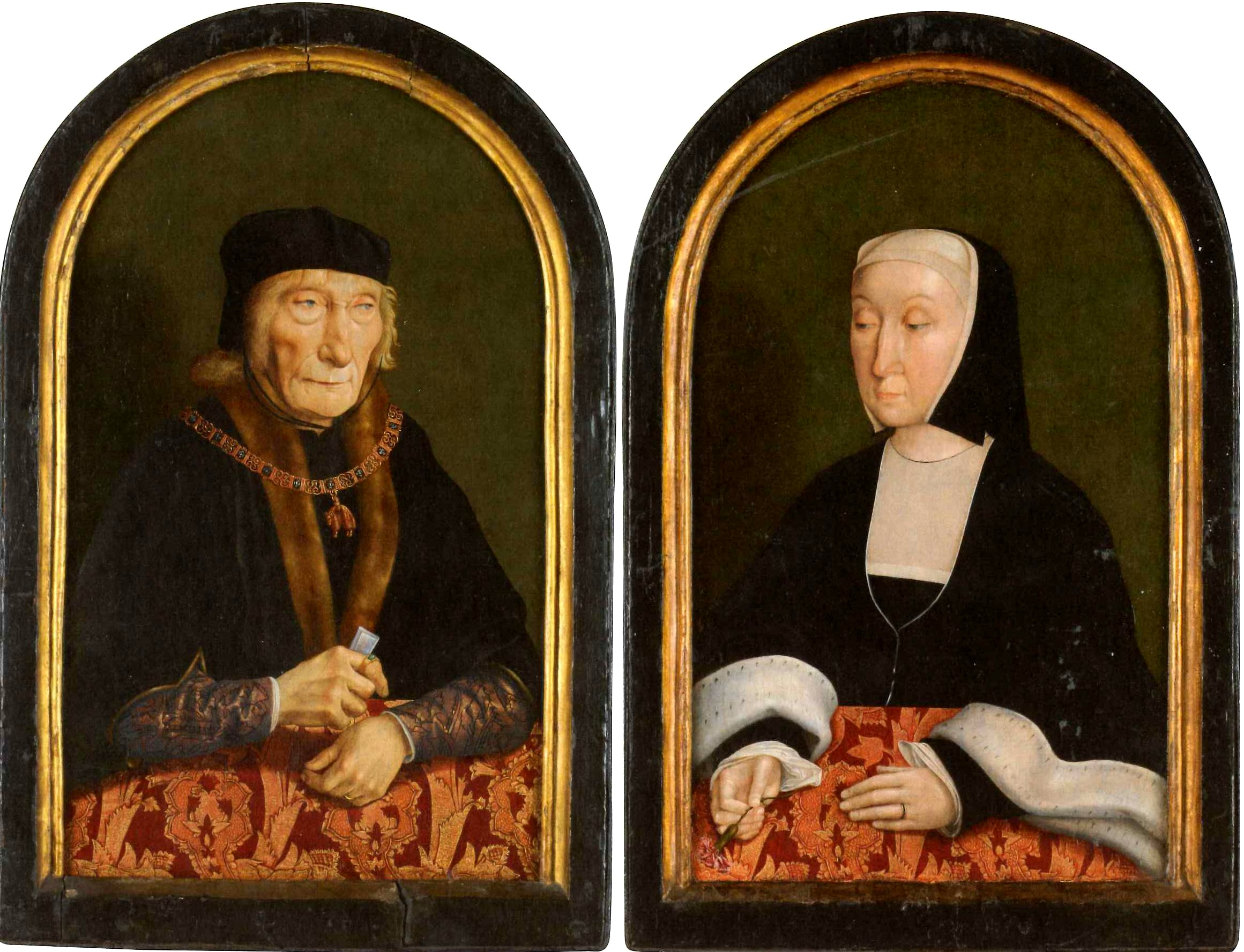
Count John III of Egmont and Countess Magdalene of Werdenberg, Walburga's parents. Portraits by the Master of Alkmaar c. 1500–1510. Metropolitan Museum of Art, New York City.

Walburga was born c. 1489 as the eldest daughter of Count John III of Egmont and Countess Magdalene of Werdenberg (from the House of Werdenberg).

Walburga met her future husband, William I of Nassau-Siegen (Dillenburg, 10 April 1487 – Dillenburg, 6 October 1559), in Arnhem in 1505, where he accompanied Elector Frederick III the Wise of Saxony. The following year, the marriage was arranged at Siegen with a messenger from Walburga's father.

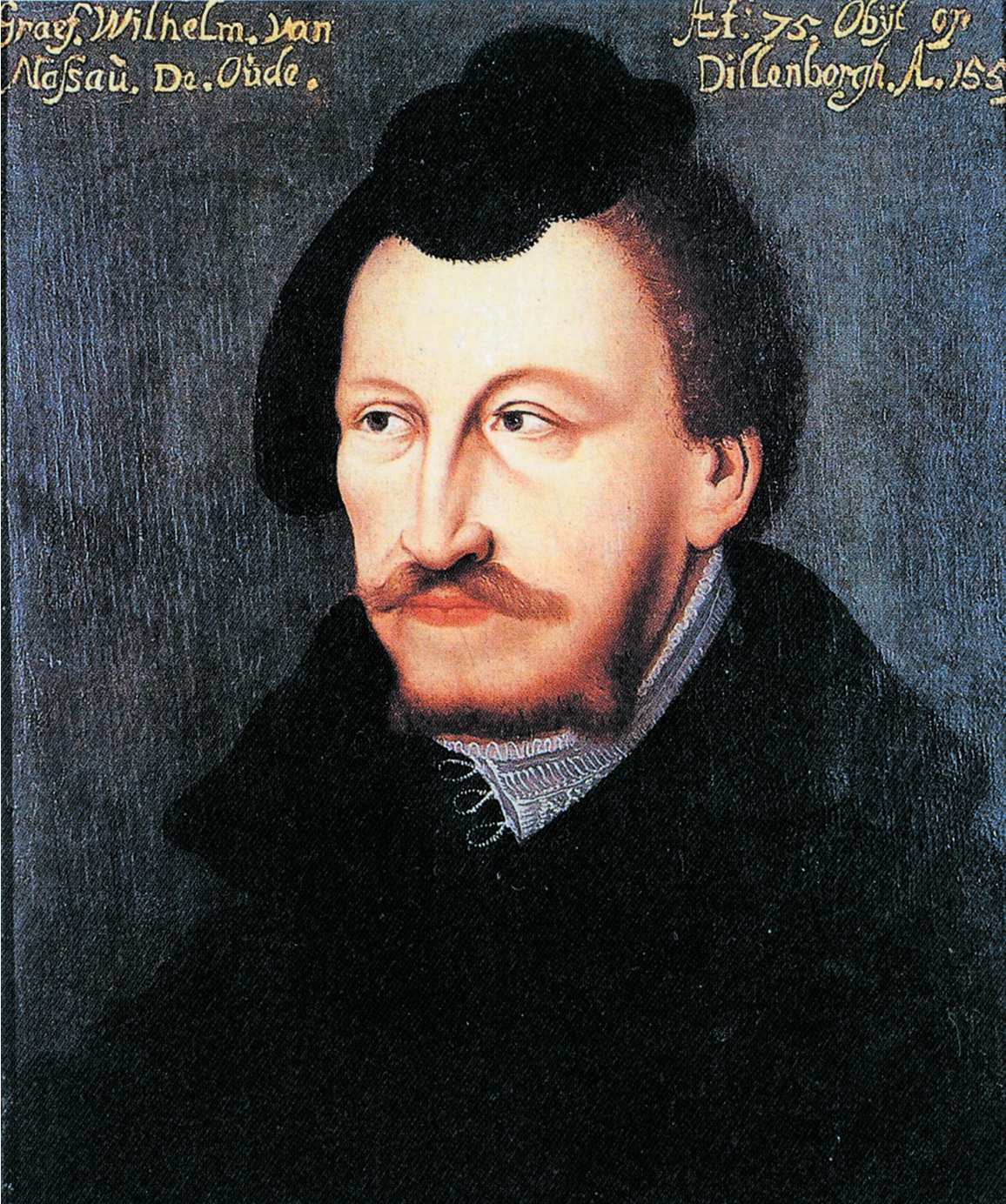
Count William I of Nassau-Siegen, Walburga's husband. Portrait by Johannes Tideman, 1671.

The marriage was consummated at Koblenz on 29 May 1506. (Note: Becker (1983), p. 55 states the wedding date Sonntag Cantate (10.5.) 1506. Sonntag Cantate is the fourth Sunday after Easter. In 1506, Easter fell on 19 April and 10 May was only the third Sunday after Easter. Dek (1968), p. 228 and Vorsterman van Oyen (1882), p. 98 state the wedding date 29 October 1506.) The glorious wedding was attended by the archbishops Herman IV of Cologne (Note: Archbishop Herman IV of Cologne was an uncle of Landgravine Elisabeth of Hesse-Marburg, the groom's mother.) and John II of Trier and many other guests from the high nobility. Henry, the groom's brother, had come over from the Netherlands.

Shortly before, on 16 February 1506, the Beilager of William's sisters Elisabeth and Mary, who married the counts John III of Wied and Jobst I of Holstein-Schauenburg-Pinneberg respectively, was celebrated in Dillenburg with the greatest of festivities. The purchase of gold fabric for 747 guilders and silk fabric for 396 guilders at the trade fair in Mainz for these celebrations, as well as the unusually high total expenditure of 13,505 guilders in the accounts of 1505/1506, show that these weddings must have been splendid events. Soon after the wedding, William set up his own court at Dillenburg Castle.

In 1516, following the death of his father Count John V of Nassau-Siegen, William succeeded him as Count of Nassau-Siegen and of half Diez. Since then William and Walburga had their Residenz in Siegen.

Walburga died on 7 March 1529 and was buried next to her eldest daughter in the crypt of St. John's Church in the Franciscan monastery in Siegen, which her father-in-law had founded. In 1836, they were reburied in St. Mary's Church in Siegen.

William's brother Henry suggested the widower to look for a new life companion in the highest princely houses and suggested a princess of Lorraine, "die ein gut heiratgut mitbrächte" ("who brought in a rich marital estate"). Instead William remarried in Siegen on 20 September 1531 to Countess Juliane of Stolberg-Wernigerode (Stolberg, 15 February 1506 – Dillenburg, 18 June 1580).

== Issue ==
From the marriage of Walburga and William, the following children were born: (Note: One can find the claim that Walburga and William had five children in Schipperus, P.J. (2018). Philips Willem. De verloren zoon van Willem van Oranje (in Dutch). Utrecht: Uitgeverij Omniboek. p. 21. ISBN 978-94-0191-070-5. But it is confirmed that there were only two daughters in Van Stipriaan, René (2021). De Zwijger. Het leven van Willem van Oranje (in Dutch) (7th ed.). Amsterdam & Antwerpen: Querido Facto. p. 20. ISBN 978-90-214-0275-8.)

1. Elisabeth (Siegen, October 1515 – Siegen (?), January 1523).
2. Magdalene (Siegen, 6 October 1522 – 18 August 1567), married on 16 July 1538 to Count Herman of Neuenahr and Moers (1514 – 4 December 1578).

== Sources ==
- Aßmann, Helmut & Menk, Friedhelm (1996). Auf den Spuren von Nassau und Oranien in Siegen (in German). Siegen: Gesellschaft für Stadtmarketing Siegen e.V.
- Becker, E. (1983) [1950]. Schloss und Stadt Dillenburg. Ein Gang durch ihre Geschichte in Mittelalter und Neuzeit. Zur Gedenkfeier aus Anlaß der Verleihung der Stadtrechte am 20. September 1344 herausgegeben (in German) (Neuauflage ed.). Dillenburg: Der Magistrat der Stadt Dillenburg.
- Dek, A.W.E. (1968). "De afstammelingen van Juliana van Stolberg tot aan het jaar van de Vrede van Münster". Spiegel der Historie. Maandblad voor de geschiedenis der Nederlanden (in Dutch). 1968 (7/8): 228–303.
- Dek, A.W.E. (1970). Genealogie van het Vorstenhuis Nassau (in Dutch). Zaltbommel: Europese Bibliotheek.
- Van Ditzhuyzen, Reinildis (2004) [1992]. Oranje-Nassau. Een biografisch woordenboek (in Dutch) (3rd ed.). Haarlem: Becht. ISBN 90-230-1124-4.
- Huberty, Michel; Giraud, Alain & Magdelaine, F. & B. (1981). l'Allemagne Dynastique (in French). Vol. Tome III: Brunswick-Nassau-Schwarzbourg. Le Perreux: Alain Giraud. ISBN 2-901138-03-9.
- Kolb, Richard (1898). "Wilhelm (der Reiche), Graf von Nassau-Katzenellenbogen". Allgemeine Deutsche Biographie (in German). Vol. Band 43. Leipzig: Duncker & Humblot. pp. 129–131.
- Lück, Alfred (1981) [1967]. Siegerland und Nederland (in German) (2nd ed.). Siegen: Siegerländer Heimatverein e.V.
- Menk, Friedhelm (1994). "Die nassauischen Begräbnisstätten in der ev. Stadtkirche zu Dillenburg". In Pletz-Krehahn, Hans-Jürgen (ed.). 650 Jahre Stadt Dillenburg. Ein Text- und Bildband zum Stadtrechtsjubiläum der Oranierstadt (in German). Dillenburg: Verlag E. Weidenbach GmbH + Co. KG. pp. 119–125.
- Schutte, O. (1979). "Genealogische gegevens". In Tamse, C.A. (ed.). Nassau en Oranje in de Nederlandse geschiedenis (in Dutch). Alphen aan den Rijn: A.W. Sijthoff. pp. 40–44. ISBN 90-218-2447-7.
- Textor von Haiger, Johann (1617). Nassauische Chronik. In welcher des vralt, hochlöblich, vnd weitberühmten Stamms vom Hause Naßaw, Printzen vnd Graven Genealogi oder Stammbaum: deren geburt, leben, heurath, kinder, zu Friden- vnd Kriegszeiten verzichtete sachen und thaten, absterben, und sonst denckwürdige Geschichten. Sampt einer kurtzen general Nassoviae und special Beschreibung der Graf- und Herschaften Naßaw-Catzenelnbogen, etc (in German). Herborn: Christoph Raab.
- Vorsterman van Oyen, A.A. (1882). Het vorstenhuis Oranje-Nassau. Van de vroegste tijden tot heden (in Dutch). Leiden & Utrecht: A.W. Sijthoff & J.L. Beijers.

Walburga of Egmont House of Egmond Born: c. 1489 Died: 7 March 1529
Regnal titles
| Preceded by Elisabeth of Hesse-Marburg | Countess Consort of Nassau-Siegen; 30 July 1516 – 7 March 1529 | Vacant Title next held by Juliane of Stolberg-Wernigerode |
