= Elisabeth of Hesse-Marburg =

German landgravine (1466–1523)

- Countess Consort of Nassau-Siegen
- Coat of arms
- Full name: Elisabeth Landgravine of Hesse-Marburg
- Native name: Elisabeth Landgräfin von Hessen-Marburg
- Born: May 1466; Marburg
- Died: 17 January 1523; Cologne
- Buried: St. John's Church, Franciscan monastery, Siegen; Reburied: St. Mary's Church, Siegen 1836
- Noble family: House of Hesse-Marburg
- Spouse: John V, Count of Nassau-Siegen
- Issue Detail: Henry III; John; Ernest; William I the Rich; Elisabeth; Mary
- Father: Henry III the Rich of Hesse-Marburg
- Mother: Anne of Katzenelnbogen

Landgravine Elisabeth of Hesse-Marburg (May 1466 – 17 January 1523), German: Elisabeth Landgräfin von Hessen-Marburg, was a landgravine from the House of Hesse-Marburg and through marriage Countess of Nassau-Siegen. She was heiress to the County of Katzenelnbogen, which after her brother's death was claimed both by her and the Landgraviate of Hesse. The legal dispute for the County of Katzenelnbogen between the House of Nassau and the House of Hesse lasted until well after her death and is known as the Katzenelnbogische Erbfolgestreit.

== Biography ==
Elisabeth was born in Marburg in May 1466 as the eldest daughter of Landgrave Henry III the Rich of Hesse-Marburg and Countess Anne of Katzenelnbogen.

Count Philip the Elder of Katzenelnbogen, Elisabeth's maternal grandfather, had two sons. The eldest son, Count Philip the Younger, was married to Countess Ottilie of Nassau-Siegen, but died already in 1453. The second son, Count Eberhard, died three years later. After becoming a widower in 1471, Philip the Elder remarried in 1474, at the age of 72, to the 32 years old Countess Anne of Nassau-Siegen, a first cousin of his daughter-in-law. The marriage of Philip the Elder and Anne of Nassau-Siegen remained childless, so that upon his death in 1479 the County of Katzenelnbogen was inherited by his daughter Anne and her husband Henry III the Rich of Hesse-Marburg, Elisabeth's parents.

Elisabeth married in Marburg on 11 February 1482 to Count John V of Nassau-Siegen (Breda, 9 November 1455 – Dillenburg or Siegen, (Note: Schutte (1979), p. 42 and Dek (1970), p. 70 state Dillenburg as place of death, and Vorsterman van Oyen (1882), p. 95 states Dillenburg Castle. Assman & Menk (1996), however, state Siegen Castle as place of death and Joachim (1881), p. 253 states Siegen. Brachthäuser (2016), p. 8 does not mention a place of death at all.) 30 July 1516), the youngest brother of her step-grandmother.

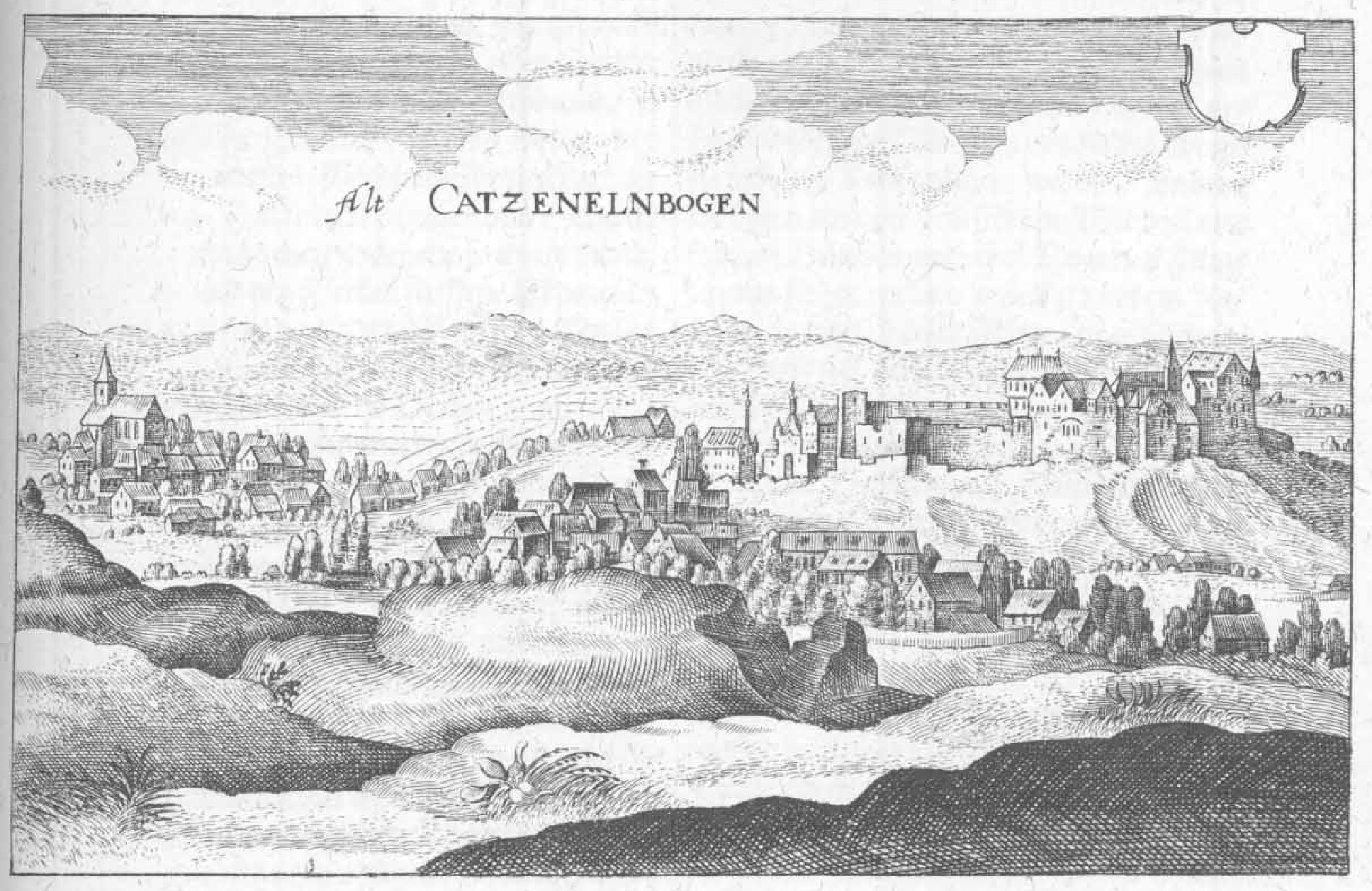
The city of Katzenelnbogen. Engraving by Matthäus Merian from the Topographia Hassiae, 1655.

Elisabeth's father died in 1483; he was succeeded by his son William III the Younger. The latter stipulated that his sisters Elisabeth and Matilda should be compensated with 50,000 florins. John protested against this on behalf of his wife in 1488. At the time of the marriage John had renounced all claims to Elisabeth's inheritance, but with the exception of her mother's inheritance. William III the Younger died in 1500 without legitimate children. His Landgraviate of Hesse-Marburg was inherited by Landgrave William II the Middle of Hesse-Kassel. Matilda renounced her inheritance, so that her elder sister Elisabeth remained the sole heir to Katzenelnbogen. Indeed, Elisabeth laid claim to all her brother's possessions and John immediately assumed the title Count of Katzenelnbogen. But when the negotiations with William II the Middle of Hesse-Kassel began, he resigned that title. For both Hesse and Nassau, the County of Katzenelnbogen was a desirable inheritance, not only because of its wealth, but also because of its geographical location. The county was situated between the Taunus and the Lahn and was very rich due to the possession of a large number of Rhine tolls between Mainz and the border of the Netherlands. The county consisted of Rheinfels, Sankt Goar, Braubach, Hohenstein, Darmstadt, Zwingenberg, Rüsselsheim and Umstadt, as well as Eppstein, the district of Driedorf and parts of Diez, Hadamar, Ems, Löhnberg, Camberg, Altweilnau and Wehrheim. The last seven possessions were jointly owned with the Counts of Nassau.

Because Elisabeth's brother-in-law Engelbert II of Nassau had no legitimate children, he brought Elisabeth's eldest son Henry to his court in Breda and Brussels in 1499, provided for his further education and appointed him his heir. After the death of his uncle in 1504, Henry succeeded him in all his possessions.

On 24 May 1501, (Note: Joachim (1881), pp. 252–253 states the date 24 May 1500.) Emperor Maximilian I forbade William II the Middle to violate the County of Katzenelnbogen or to take violent steps against the House of Nassau. John also received some fiefs of Katzenelnbogen from the Duke of Jülich and the Abbey of Prüm. Tensions between Hesse and Nassau increased when William II the Middle took possession of Katzenelnbogen, disregarding the rights of Elisabeth. All of John's attempts to gain his wife's rights were in vain, despite several amicable negotiations. To settle the matter by force against the powerful House of Hesse did not occur to him. Therefore John filed a complaint with the Reichskammergericht. In 1507 the court ruled that half the county should be awarded to Elisabeth. But William II the Middle refused to accept this judgment.

After the death of Elisabeth's husband John in 1516, their sons Henry and William continued Elisabeth's case with increasing vigour. Henry's high position and close personal relationship with Roman King Charles V as an educator, general and advisor gave the Nassaus powerful support in this protracted legal battle. On the other side stood their energetic opponent, the young Landgrave Philip I the Magnanimous of Hesse. He had an advantage because Hesse had gained control of the entire disputed territory, which gave him a strong position over the small County of Nassau-Siegen; in addition, powerful imperial princes, such as Elector Frederick III the Wise of Saxony, were on his side as allies.

In 1520 Charles V referred the dispute from the Reichskammergericht to the Reichshofrat. This seemed to be very favourable for Elisabeth, because Alexander Schweis from Herborn, who was Henryʼs secretary, served as a judge in the latter court. It was probably also due to Henryʼs great influence on Charles V that the case was also discussed at the Imperial Diet of Worms in 1521. But there was no final decision there either. A commission consisting of the Prince bishops Christoph of Augsburg, George of Bamberg and William III of Strasbourg was given the task of re-examining the case, which had been handled by the most important legal scholars of the time. The verdict, to which both parties had unconditionally submitted in advance, was handed down in Tübingen on 9 May 1523. It was favourable to Elisabeth and awarded her almost the entire inheritance.

Shortly before the verdict from Tübingen, Elisabeth died in Cologne on 17 January 1523. (Note: Schutte (1979), p. 42 states the date 7 or 17 January 1523.) In Cologne the Counts of Nassau owned a house ("das achte Haus von der Goltgassenecken nach St. Cunibert hin"), which made the connection between their possessions in the Netherlands and their counties in Germany easier for them. Elisabeth was buried next to her husband in the crypt of St. John's Church in the Franciscan monastery in Siegen, which her husband had founded. In 1836, both were reburied in St. Mary's Church in Siegen.

As Philip of Hesse refused to hand over Katzenelnbogen to Elisabeth's son and heir William, the dispute was not settled until 1557.

== Elisabeth and John V depicted on one of the Nassau tapestries? ==
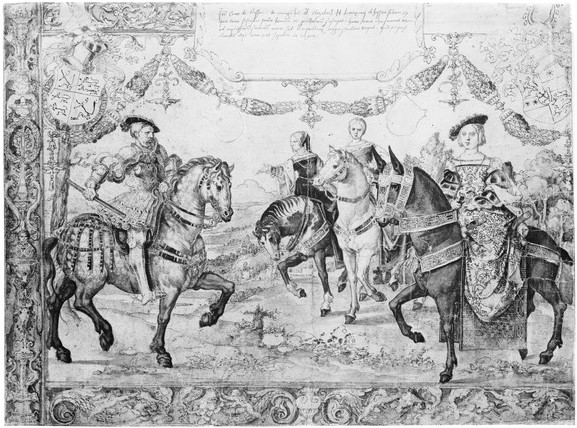
Design drawing by Bernard van Orley for the eighth tapestry in the series containing the genealogy of the House of Nassau, c. 1528–1530. Staatliche Graphische Sammlung München. Does this drawing depict John V and his wife Elisabeth? Or their son Henry III and his three wives?

Around 1531, the son of Elisabeth and John V, Henry III, had a series of eight tapestries with the genealogy of the House of Nassau woven. These tapestries were lost in the 18th century. The design drawings for the tapestries were made by Bernard van Orley. Seven of those drawings have been preserved, only the design drawing for the fifth tapestry, depicting Count John I of Nassau-Siegen and Countess Margaret of the Mark, is missing. The theme of the series was the descent of the House of Nassau, whereby the dynastic significance was paramount. This genealogy was given extra splendour by the fact that, in addition to the direct descent from Count Otto I of Nassau, Roman King Adolf was also included in the series. On each tapestry, a man and woman sitting on horseback are depicted facing each other. The rather unusual composition remains lively due to the alternation in clothing and poses and the position of the horses. The mostly hilly landscape in the background is sometimes interrupted by trees in the foreground. The coats of arms in the top corners and the cartouche with the inscription in between are connected by garlands that stand out sharply against the sky. It is also clear from the designs for the first and last tapestry that the main scenes were surrounded by wide carpet borders. The drawings also show the great care taken with the inscriptions in the cartouches, which are written in the same hand on all seven of the surviving drawings, and with the heraldic details of the coats of arms. With the coats of arms, indications have been written in French about inaccuracies, especially about the mirror-image representation of the male arms. It is known that Henry III paid special attention to this aspect and corresponded with his brother William I about it. The design for the last tapestry in the series differs from the other designs in that it depicts three women instead of one. As the inscription does not mention the identity of the two women in the background, this has given rise to much speculation.

L.J. van der Klooster, curator of the topography department of the Netherlands Institute for Art History, argued that the design drawing for the last tapestry contains a clear mistake. The text in the cartouche indicates that depicted are John V and Elisabeth of Hesse-Marburg, the parents of the commissioner of the tapestries, Henry III. However, the horseman depicted in the drawing wears the collar of the Order of the Golden Fleece around his neck. The coat of arms in the corner of the drawing is also decorated with this collar. Now it is remarkable that John V was never a member of the Order of the Golden Fleece. So there is a contradiction between text and image. Since the discovery of the drawing in the Alte Pinakothek in Munich in 1904, it has been argued that the text in the inscription is incorrect and that the commissioner himself, Henry III of Nassau and his three wives are depicted in this drawing. The obvious collar of the Golden Fleece, the three female figures, being his wife Mencía de Mendoza and his two predeceased wives, as well as the strong resemblance of both Henry himself and Mencía to other portraits of that couple, indicated that.

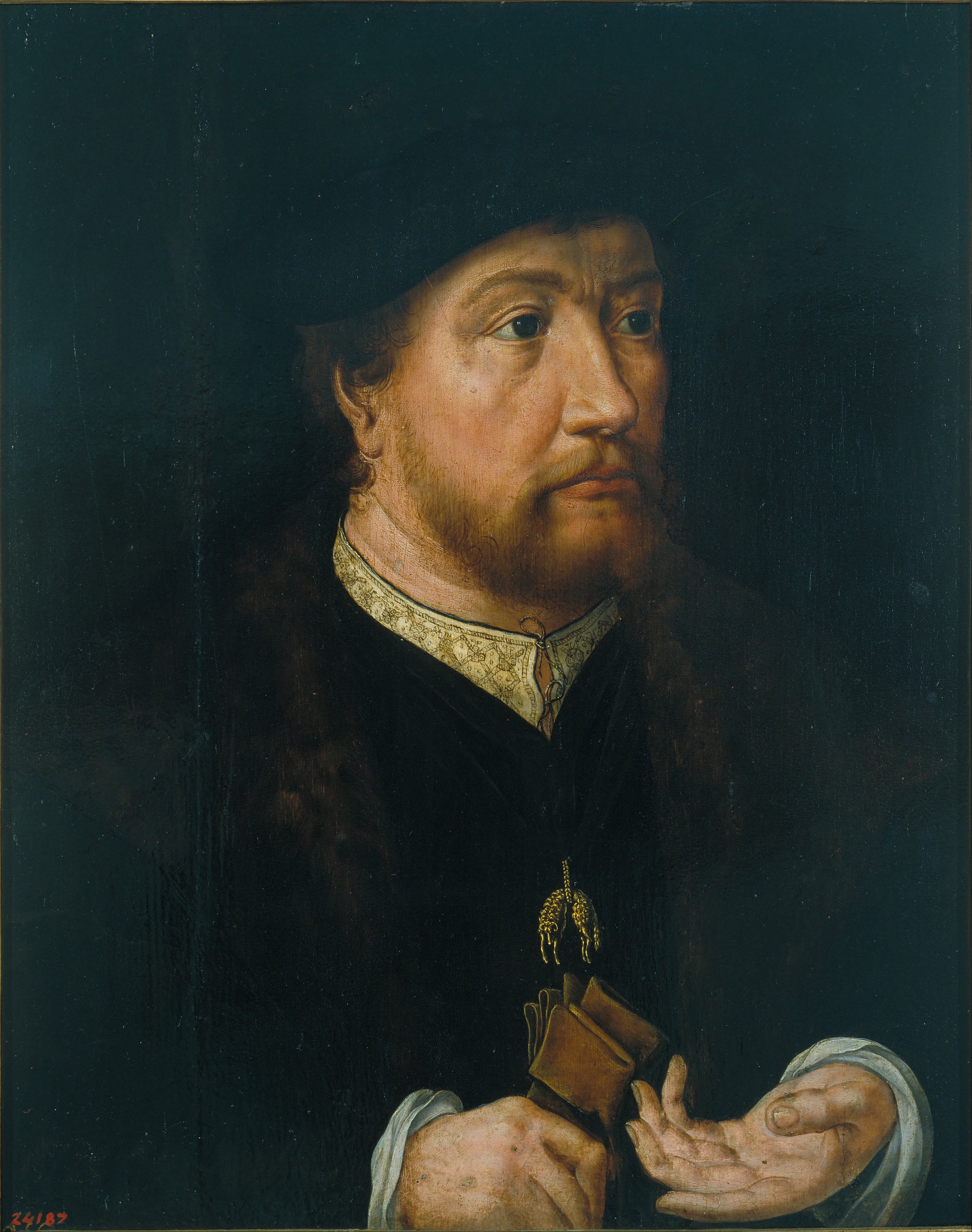
Count Henry III of Nassau-Breda. Portrait by Jan Gossaert, 1530–1532. Museu Nacional d'Art de Catalunya, Barcelona.

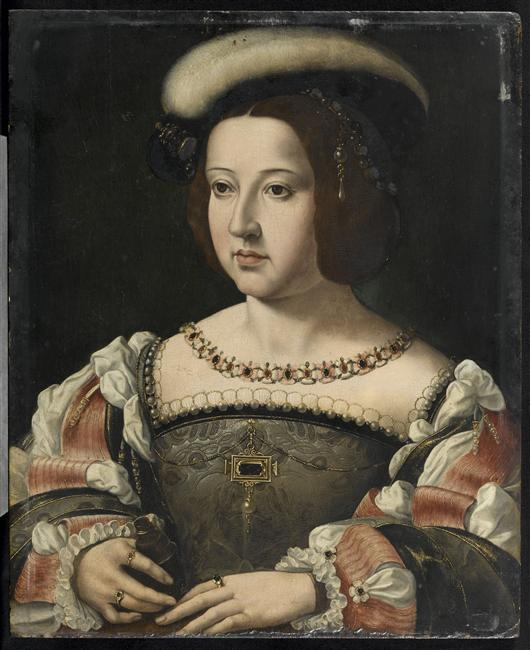
Mencía de Mendoza. Portrait by Jan Gossaerts, 1500–1550. Musée Condé, Chantilly, Oise.

Van der Klooster argued that in a work of art, one should always start from the most original form of the object. In this drawing he stated, it is clear that the inscription in the cartouche, as well as the filling in of the shields, were added early, but somewhat later in the sixteenth century, because the colour of the paint indicates this. The drawing therefore originally had an empty cartouche and empty shields. The collar of the Order of the Golden Fleece around the shield does, however, belong to the first instance of the drawing. Van der Klooster also argued that there is an unmistakable portrait similarity between the horseman and his wife and some portraits of Henry III and Mencía de Mendoza, namely those by Jan Gossaert. Further Van der Klooster stated that the collar of the Order of the Golden Fleece which the horseman wears and which also hangs around his coat of arms marks him as a member of the order. According to the statutes, a Knight of the Golden Fleece was obliged to wear the insignia. Abuses were punished severely. John V has never been a Knight of the Golden Fleece, but Henry III had been since 1505. Van Orley, who worked for the court, must have been well aware of this rule. He could not afford to make a mistake. Van der Klooster stated this being the most essential point in his analysis.

Van der Klooster further stated that the portrait of Mencía in the drawing has acquired a permanent place in Spanish costume history. One could say that it followed the fashion of the international courtiers around Emperor Charles V. His sister Archduchess Eleanor is depicted in entirely similar attire in her portraits by Joos van Cleve. The German Elisabeth of Hesse-Marburg – of whom no portraits are known – must have been dressed according to a completely different fashion in her day. The so-called German hat and the wide cloak, often with a broad collar, determined the fashion image in the Northern European countries.

Of the nine women in the tapestries, eight are on horseback. Only the woman, whom Van der Klooster regards as Mencía de Mendoza, rides a mule. According to Van der Klooster, in those days, especially in Spain, the mule was considered the most suitable riding animal for women. When in September 1517 Emperor Charles V made his first journey to Spain in the company of a large retinue, among them Dutch chroniclers and artists, the party came into contact with the mule for the transport of the ladies. As far as Van der Klooster could ascertain, a woman riding a mule appeared for the first time in Dutch art on a print by Jacob Cornelisz van Oostsanen in the series Counts of Holland. However, this print is explicitly dated 1 April 1518. The artists who had accompanied the Emperor to Spain could have returned by now. The fact that, unlike the other countesses, the Spanish Mencía de Mendoza is the only one riding on a mule is therefore a factor in the identification according to Van der Klooster.

According to Van der Klooster, the series of tapestries relates to the genealogy of the House of Nassau, not to its possessions. The tapestry of Engelbert I and Joanne of Polanen does not allude to her rich heritage, including Breda, which was so important to Henry III. Van der Klooster admitted that against his view the fact speaks that the inscription in the cartouche explicitly states only as depicted: John V and his wife Elisabeth. Also, the original series of eight tapestries never included one depicting Henry III and his wives. In Van der Klooster's opinion, the error lies in the application of the inscription, for which he was unable to give an explanation. Therefore the fate of this design drawing is that it will continue to carry an internal contradiction, according to Van der Klooster. His view of the proposed depicted persons led Van der Klooster to the hypothesis that around 1530 the idea of making a tapestry of the commissioner was considered. The series then would not have ended with his parents, but with Henry III. This in itself Van der Klooster considered a reasonable possibility. The series would then have consisted of nine and not eight tapestries. But Van der Klooster admitted that the present series, however, always consisted of eight tapestries, as the inventory of 19 July 1539 already mentions them: "huyt pieces de tapisserie de la genealogie de feu monseigneur du lignaige de Nassaw" ("eight pieces of tapestry of the genealogy of the late lord of the lineage of Nassau"). In Van der Klooster's view, the design drawing remains the only reminder of a probably unexecuted plan. The existence or non-existence of a ninth tapestry, according to Van der Klooster, is not relevant for the identification of the people, as this is only a design drawing.

C.W. Fock, Professor of the History of Applied Arts at the Institute of Art History of Leiden University, argued that there must be very conclusive reasons for opposing the inscription and the coat of arms shown on the drawing, precisely because it is so clear that much attention was paid to this aspect. The inscription is written in the same 16th century hand as on the other drawings, probably contemporary with the designs of the whole series. Moreover, all historical sources indicate that the last, eighth tapestry depicted John V and his wife Elisabeth and not the commissioner Henry III. Fock further argued that the face of the man indeed resembles portraits of Henry III. However, no portraits of John V are known and it is certainly possible that Henry had inherited the features of his father. A resemblance of the front woman to the portrait of Mencía de Mendoza is demonstrable, especially in the hairstyle; the facial features themselves are in fact not very individual. Apart from the hairstyle, the face of the second woman in the drawing hardly differs from that of the woman in the foreground.

Fock also pointed out that the view that the mule should be interpreted as a reference to Mencía's Spanish origin cannot be sustained. Already on the woodcut of 1518 by Jacob Cornelisz van Oostsanen with the counts and countesses of Holland, several women ride mules instead of horses. Nor can the braided band pattern on the cloth be interpreted as a clear reference to Spain. This motif, originally Arabic and Moorish, appeared almost simultaneously at the beginning of the 16th century in Italy, at the French court and in Germany, where artists such as Albrecht Dürer and Hans Holbein frequently used it. Van Orley, who was greatly impressed by Dürer, whom he also met during his journey through the Netherlands in 1521, may therefore have used this then very fashionable motif as a progressive artist for entirely different reasons. Fock did point out that the fact that John V, unlike his son, had no right to wear the collar of the Golden Fleece and to carry it with his coat of arms is a valid argument.

Fock continued to argue for the identification of the couple according to the inscription and the coats of arms as John V and Elisabeth, as it is known that the series of eight tapestries did not contain a tapestry depicting Henry III, accompanied by one or all three of his wives. The eighth tapestry must have depicted John V and Elisabeth. The inscriptions on the tapestries, known not only from the drawings but also from various written sources, indicate mainly the intention to glorify the deceased ancestors. Apart from emphasising their good and heroic deeds, the succession within the family, which repeatedly did not go through the eldest son, is also explained several times. In this context, the texts also mention other family members who are not depicted, such as the eldest son Adolf I in the fifth tapestry, the second son Henry II in the sixth tapestry, and the eldest son Engelbert II in the seventh tapestry. In the last tapestry, the two sons of John V – Henry III and William I – are mentioned in the same way, which is reason enough to assume that it was not the intention to depict them on a tapestry, let alone glorify them. In addition, the inscriptions strongly emphasise on the possessions brought in by the woman. In Fock's opinion, this also holds the key to the identification of the two unknown women, which is related to the inheritance of the County of Katzenelnbogen, which was so important for Nassau at the time. The inscription on the drawing lists John's wife as Elisabeth, daughter of the Landgrave of Hesse. It is striking and indicative of the importance of her claim to the County of Katzenelnbogen that this very wording was changed during the execution on the eighth tapestry and she was referred to as the daughter of the Countess of Katzenelnbogen.

At the time of the creation of the tapestries, the Katzenelnbogische Erbfolgestreit was a very important issue for the Nassaus. According to Fock the tapestry seems to allude to this, by depicting Elisabeth's sister Matilda in the background to the left of Elisabeth, who had left the inheritance to Elisabeth. The older woman on the left must be the older sister of John V, Anne, who was married to the last Count of Katzenelnbogen and, although she had no legal standing in the matter, through her marriage provided moral support for the claims of the Nassau dynasty. This solution, Fock argued, corresponds best to the intention of the tapestries to emphasise the dynastic importance and territorial claims of the family.

More importantly, in Fock's opinion, the ages of the two women in the background, where there is clearly a generation gap between the woman on the left and the two others, are also correct; this is in contrast to the ages of Henry III's three wives. His first wife, Françoise Louise of Savoy-Vaud, was born before 1486, the second wife, Claudia of Chalon, in 1498, and the third wife, Mencía de Mendoza, in 1508, which according to Fock is in no way consistent with the respective ages of the three women in the design drawing; the first two women both died at a young age. Moreover, Fock argued, one may seriously doubt whether, if it had been the three wives of Henry III, the two first wives would not have been treated in a more equal way instead of being treated in such a secondary manner. Through Claudia of Chalon, the Principality of Orange had just passed to Henry's son in 1530, such an honour for the family that it is almost inconceivable in Fock's view, that it would not have expressed in some form in the tapestry, if only in a prominent position also for Claudia of Chalon. This identification also explains – something that in Fock's opinion would otherwise be inexplicable with all the attention paid to the coats of arms – that the two shields of the women in the background were left blank. Anne of Nassau had the same coat of arms as her brother John V and Matilda of Hesse the same as her sister Elisabeth. The indicated coats of arms of John and Elisabeth were therefore enough of a clue. Moreover, the two blank shields are partly painted over with white (it shows through a bit now), which could even indicate that the coats of arms would be left out in second instance.

On the website of the Netherlands Institute for Art History (the former employer of Van der Klooster) it is stated that the picture depicts Henry III with his wife Mencía de Mendoza and two deceased wives. It is also stated there that he was previously identified as his father John V on the basis of a later added erroneous inscription and coat of arms. Finally it states that the identification as Henry III is on the basis of the portrait of Mencía de Mendoza, her Spanish mule, the Order of the Golden Fleece and the 'three wives'.

== Issue ==
From the marriage of Elisabeth and John the following children were born:

1. Count Henry III (Siegen, 12 January 1483 – Breda Castle, 14 September 1538), succeeded his uncle Engelbert II in 1504. Married:
  1. on 3 August 1503 to Countess Françoise Louise of Savoy-Vaud (1485 – 17 September 1511);
  2. in La-Fère-sur-Oise on 24 April 1515 to Claudia of Chalon (1498 – Diest, 31 May 1521);
  3. in Burgos on 30 June 1524 to Mencía de Mendoza y Fonseca (Jadraque (?), 1 December 1508 – 4 January 1554), 2nd Marchioness of Cenete since 3 June 1523.
2. John (Tringenstein Castle, 3 November 1484 – 15 August 1504?).
3. Ernest (Dillenburg, 9 April 1486 – 12 October 1486).
4. Count William I the Rich (Dillenburg, 10 April 1487 – Dillenburg Castle, 6 October 1559), succeeded his father in 1516. Married:
  1. in Koblenz on 29 May 1506 (Note: Becker (1983), p. 55 states the wedding date Sonntag Cantate (10.5.) 1506. Sonntag Cantate is the fourth Sunday after Easter. In 1506, Easter fell on 19 April and 10 May was only the third Sunday after Easter. Dek (1968), p. 228 and Vorsterman van Oyen (1882), p. 98 state the wedding date 29 October 1506.) to Countess Walburga of Egmont (Note: Given name in accordance with Lück (1981), p. 41 and Dek (1970), p. 72. The given name Walburgis in Van Ditzhuyzen (2004), p. 249 and Schutte (1979), p. 43, Walpurgis in Becker (1983), p. 55, Walburgia in Dek (1968), p. 228, and Walburg in Vorsterman van Oyen (1882), p. 98.) (c. 1489 – 7 March 1529);
  2. in Siegen Castle (Note: Van Ditzhuyzen (2004), p. 249, on the other hand, states that the wedding took place in Königstein (Taunus).) on 20 September 1531 to Countess Juliane of Stolberg-Wernigerode (Stolberg, 15 February 1506 – Dillenburg, 18 June 1580).
5. Elisabeth (1488 – Dillenburg, 3 June 1559), married in Siegen in February 1506 to Count John III of Wied (1485 (Note: The year of birth 1485 is stated by Schutte (1979), p. 42, and Dek (1970), p. 71. However, his mother's date of death is stated as 12 March 1478 by Stammtafel des mediatisierten Hauses Wied. Which of these two dates is incorrect is unclear.) – 18 May 1533).
6. Mary (Vianden, February 1491 – Siegen, 1547 (Note: The year of death 1543 in Vorsterman van Oyen (1882), p. 97.)), married in Siegen in February 1506 to Count Jobst I of Holstein-Schauenburg-Pinneberg (1483 – 5 June 1531 (Note: The date of death 5 June 1532 in Vorsterman van Oyen (1882), p. 97.)).

The double wedding of Elisabeth and Mary was held at Siegen Castle. A banquet was also held in the city hall in Siegen at which both brides and grooms were present. The feast with the city magistrates was paid for by the brides' father and the city council donated 16 oxen and 19 pigs for the feast. On 16 February 1506, the ʻBeilagerʼ of the two sisters was celebrated in Dillenburg with the greatest of festivities. The purchase of gold fabric for 747 guilders and silk fabric for 396 guilders at the trade fair in Mainz for these celebrations and the wedding of their brother William in Koblenz in May 1506, as well as the unusually high total expenditure of 13,505 guilders in the accounts of 1505/1506, show that these weddings must have been splendid events.

== Ancestors ==
Ancestors of Elisabeth of Hesse-Marburg
Great-great-grandparents	Louis II of Hesse (d. 1345) ⚭ 1340; Elisabeth of Sponheim (?–?)	Frederick V of Nuremberg (1333–1398) ⚭ 1350; Elisabeth of Meissen (1329–1375)	Frederick III the Strict of Meissen (1332–1381) ⚭ 1344; Catherine of Henneberg (d. 1397)	Henry II the Mild of Brunswick-Lüneburg (d. 1416) ⚭ 1388; Sophie of Pomerania (d. 1406)	Thierry VIII of Katzenelnbogen (d. 1402) ⚭ 1361; Elisabeth of Nassau-Wiesbaden-Idstein (d. 1389)	Eberhard of Katzenelnbogen (d. 1403) ⚭ 1367; Agnes of Diez (d. 1399)	Eberhard III the Clement of Württemberg (c. 1364–1417) ⚭ 1380; Antonia Visconti (c. 1360–1405)	Henry II of Montbéliard (c. 1366–1396) ⚭ 1383; Mary of Chatillon (d. 1394)
Great-grandparents	Herman II the Scholar of Hesse (c. 1342–1413) ⚭ 1383; Margaret of Nuremberg (c. 1363–1406)		Frederick I the Belligerent of Saxony (1370–1428) ⚭ 1402; Catherine of Brunswick-Lüneburg (d. 1442)		John III of Katzenelnbogen (d. 1444) ⚭ 1383; Anne of Katzenelnbogen (d. 1439)		Eberhard IV the Younger of Württemberg (1388–1419) ⚭ 1397/98; Henriette of Montbéliard (1387–1444)	
Grandparents	Louis III the Peaceful of Hesse (1402–1458) ⚭ 1433; Anne of Saxony (1420–1462)				Philip the Elder of Katzenelnbogen (c. 1402–1479) ⚭ 1422; Anne of Württemberg (1408–1471)			
Parents	Henry III the Rich of Hesse-Marburg (1440–1483) ⚭ 1458; Anne of Katzenelnbogen (1443–1494)							

== Sources ==
- Aßmann, Helmut & Menk, Friedhelm (1996). Auf den Spuren von Nassau und Oranien in Siegen (in German). Siegen: Gesellschaft für Stadtmarketing Siegen e.V.
- Becker, E. (1983) [1950]. Schloss und Stadt Dillenburg. Ein Gang durch ihre Geschichte in Mittelalter und Neuzeit. Zur Gedenkfeier aus Anlaß der Verleihung der Stadtrechte am 20. September 1344 herausgegeben (in German) (Neuauflage ed.). Dillenburg: Der Magistrat der Stadt Dillenburg.
- Brachthäuser, Christian (1 October 2016). "Kloster, Krypta, Kontroversen. Zum 500. Todesjahr des Siegener Landesherrn Johann V. Graf zu Nassau, Katzenelnbogen, Vianden und Diez, Herr Breda, Grimbergen und Diest (1455–1516)" (PDF). Universitätsstadt Siegen. Archived from the original (PDF) on 16 October 2022.
- Dek, A.W.E. (1970). Genealogie van het Vorstenhuis Nassau (in Dutch). Zaltbommel: Europese Bibliotheek.
- Van Ditzhuyzen, Reinildis (2004) [1992]. Oranje-Nassau. Een biografisch woordenboek (in Dutch) (3rd ed.). Haarlem: Becht. ISBN 90-230-1124-4.
- Fock, C.W. (1996). "Teruggevonden ontwerpen voor de tapijtreeks De Nassause Genealogie". In Van der Klooster, L.J.; Tiethoff-Spliethoff, M.E. & Tamse, C.A. (eds.). Jaarboek Oranje-Nassau Museum 1995 (in Dutch). Rotterdam: Barjesteh, Meeuwes & Co Historische Uitgeverij. pp. 39–56. ISBN 90-73714-23-0.
- Huberty, Michel; Giraud, Alain & Magdelaine, F. & B. (1981). l'Allemagne Dynastique (in French). Vol. Tome III: Brunswick-Nassau-Schwarzbourg. Le Perreux: Alain Giraud. ISBN 2-901138-03-9.
- Jansen, H.P.H. (1979). "De Bredase Nassaus". In Tamse, C.A. (ed.). Nassau en Oranje in de Nederlandse geschiedenis (in Dutch). Alphen aan den Rijn: A.W. Sijthoff. pp. 11–40. ISBN 90-218-2447-7.
- Joachim, Ernst (1881). "Johann V. von Nassau-Dillenburg". Allgemeine Deutsche Biographie (in German). Vol. Band 14. Leipzig: Duncker & Humblot. pp. 252–254.
- Van der Klooster, L.J. (1996). "Johan V of Hendrik III afgebeeld op een van de ontwerpen voor de Nassause tapijten". In Van der Klooster, L.J.; Tiethoff-Spliethoff, M.E. & Tamse, C.A. (eds.). Jaarboek Oranje-Nassau Museum 1995 (in Dutch). Rotterdam: Barjesteh, Meeuwes & Co Historische Uitgeverij. pp. 57–66. ISBN 90-73714-23-0.
- Lück, Alfred (1981) [1967]. Siegerland und Nederland (in German) (2nd ed.). Siegen: Siegerländer Heimatverein e.V.
- Schutte, O. (1979). "Genealogische gegevens". In Tamse, C.A. (ed.). Nassau en Oranje in de Nederlandse geschiedenis (in Dutch). Alphen aan den Rijn: A.W. Sijthoff. pp. 40–44. ISBN 90-218-2447-7.
- Vorsterman van Oyen, A.A. (1882). Het vorstenhuis Oranje-Nassau. Van de vroegste tijden tot heden (in Dutch). Leiden & Utrecht: A.W. Sijthoff & J.L. Beijers.
- "Bernard van Orley. Hendrik III van Nassau (1483-1538) with his wife Mencia de Mendoza (1508-1554) and two deceased wives, ca. 1528-1530". RKD – Netherlands Institute for Art History.

Elisabeth of Hesse-Marburg House of Hesse-Marburg Born: May 1466 Died: 17 January 1523
Regnal titles
Vacant Title last held by Mary of Looz-Heinsberg	Countess Consort of Nassau-Siegen; 11 February 1482 – 30 July 1516	Succeeded by Walburga of Egmont
