= John V of Nassau-Siegen =

German count (1455–1516)

John V, Count of Nassau-Siegen

Count of Nassau-Siegen Count of Diez
- Coat of arms
- Reign: 1475–1516
- Predecessor: John IV
- Successor: William I the Rich
- Full name: John V, Count of Nassau-Siegen
- Native name: Johann V. Graf von Nassau-Siegen
- Born: Johann Graf zu Nassau, Vianden und Diez, Herr zu Breda; 9 November 1455; Breda
- Died: 30 July 1516 (aged 60); Dillenburg or Siegen
- Buried: St. John's Church, Franciscan monastery, Siegen; Reburied: St. Mary's Church, Siegen 1836
- Noble family: House of Nassau-Siegen
- Spouse: Elisabeth of Hesse-Marburg
- Issue Detail: Henry III; John; Ernest; William I the Rich; Elisabeth; Mary
- Father: John IV of Nassau-Siegen
- Mother: Mary of Looz-Heinsberg

Count John V of Nassau-Siegen (Note: In many sources he is called John V of Nassau(-Dillenburg). His official titles were Count of Nassau, Vianden and Diez, Lord of Breda. It is incorrect to refer to him as the only reigning Count of Nassau, because the County of Nassau was divided into Nassau-Beilstein, Nassau-Idstein, Nassau-Siegen, Nassau-Weilburg and Nassau-Wiesbaden. Furthermore, there was the cadet branch of Nassau-Saarbrücken, which ruled the County of Saarbrücken. John ruled the County of Nassau-Siegen, which is erroneously called Nassau-Dillenburg in many sources. See note 2.) (9 November 1455 – 30 July 1516), German: Johann V. Graf von Nassau-Siegen, official titles: Graf zu Nassau, Vianden und Diez, Herr zu Breda, was since 1475 Count of Nassau-Siegen (Note: The County of Nassau-Siegen is erroneously called Nassau-Dillenburg in many sources. The county was not named after the small, unimportant city of Dillenburg, which did not even have a church until 1491, but after the, for that time, large city of Siegen, the economic centre of the county and the counts' main residence. See Lück (1981), passim. Brachthäuser (2016), p. 1 states that John resided in Siegen. It is also evident from the numbering of the reigning counts with the given name John. One John without regal number who ruled the County of Nassau-Dillenburg in the period 1303–1328, and eight counts by the name of John who ruled the County of Nassau-Siegen in the period 1362–1638.) (a part of the County of Nassau) and of half Diez. He descended from the Ottonian Line of the House of Nassau.

John was Stadtholder of Guelders and Zutphen in the period 1504–1505. He took little part in imperial politics, but concentrated mainly on the administration of his own counties. During his reign, the dispute over the succession in the County of Katzenelnbogen with the Landgraviate of Hesse started (German: Katzenelnbogische Erbfolgestreit), which did not end until 41 years after his death.

John had an obvious special interest in promoting the economy of his county. He protected and promoted mining. During his reign, the number of iron mines in the Siegerland and in the Dillenburg district increased. The county's economic prospects were therefore positive. John also promoted the revival of trade by issuing numerous guild certificates. He issued ordinances for the craft of steel and blacksmiths as well as for the wool weavers' guild.

As a devout Catholic John founded a Franciscan monastery in Siegen. He also built a church in Hadamar, and in Dillenburg.

John is somewhat overshadowed by his older brother Engelbert II. In the relevant reference works about the dynastic history of the House of Orange-Nassau, especially in Dutch book editions, he is sometimes completely missing. In the very well founded biographical dictionary Oranje-Nassau by the Dutch historian Reinildis van Ditzhuyzen, for instance, one searches in vain for a mention of this Count of Nassau-Siegen, whereas his brother is praised there as a 'complete Dutch nobleman'.

== Biography ==
John was born in Breda on 9 November 1455 as the second and youngest son of Count John IV of Nassau-Siegen and Lady Mary of Looz-Heinsberg.

On 4 May 1472 John IV and his sons Engelbert and John signed an inheritance treaty in which it was decided to divide the possessions after John IV's death. The eldest son, Engelbert, would get the possessions in the Netherlands, while the youngest son, John, would get the possessions right of the River Rhine (Nassau-Siegen and Diez).

=== Count of Nassau-Siegen and Diez ===
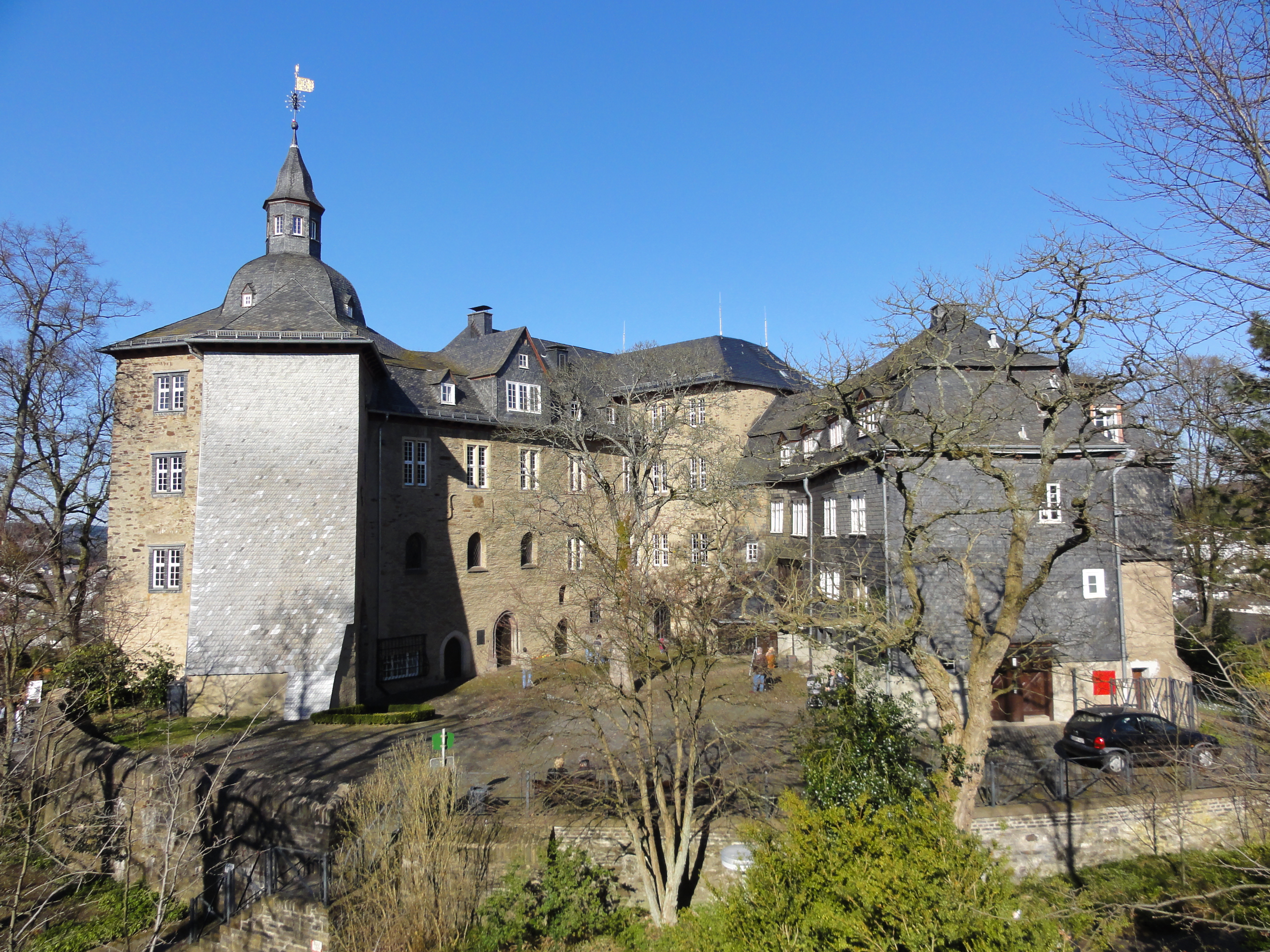
Siegen Castle, 2011.

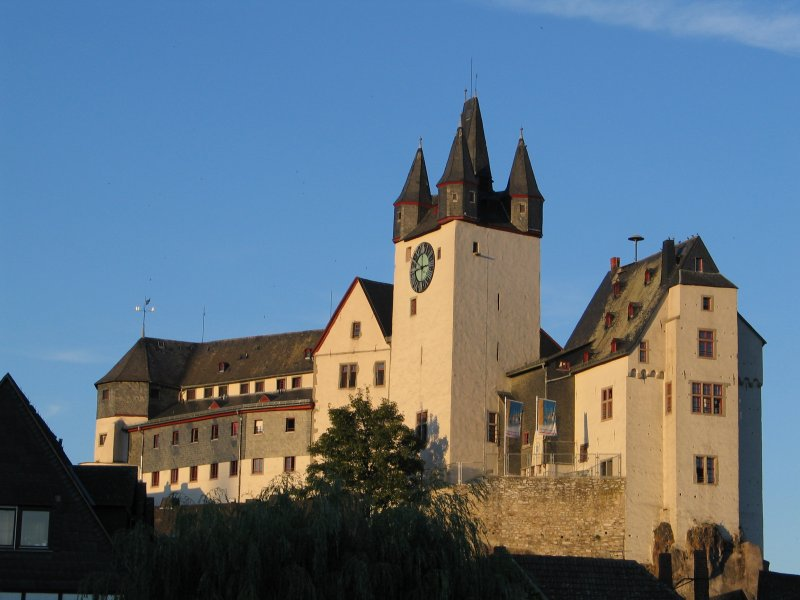
Diez Castle. Photo: Peter Klassen, 2006.

John succeeded his father in 1475 in accordance with the succession treaty of 1472. His possessions included Siegen and Dillenburg, parts of Löhnberg, Ellar and Hadamar, the districts Diez, Kirberg, Altweilnau, Wehrheim and Camberg, the Esterau, Nassau, the Einrich and Ems, furthermore the heerlijkheden Kerpen and Lommersum in the Duchy of Jülich, fiefs in Nideggen and Düren, toll rights in Ehrenfels Castle, Düsseldorf and Königsdorf and revenues in the County of Mark. He had his Residenz in Siegen. To the many common possessions, which he administered together with the different dynasties, he added a new one, namely that over Seelbach and Burbach with the Counts of Sayn. The complex jurisdictional relations in Seelbach and Burbach led to frequent disputes. John did not live to see the end of the result of the many negotiations on these matters in 1542.

The County of Nassau-Siegen was divided into districts (Ämter). In each district (Amt) the count appointed an Amtmann. These were members of the local nobility and deputised for the count. They had a number of servants to guard the public order. In times of war they formed the core of the army.

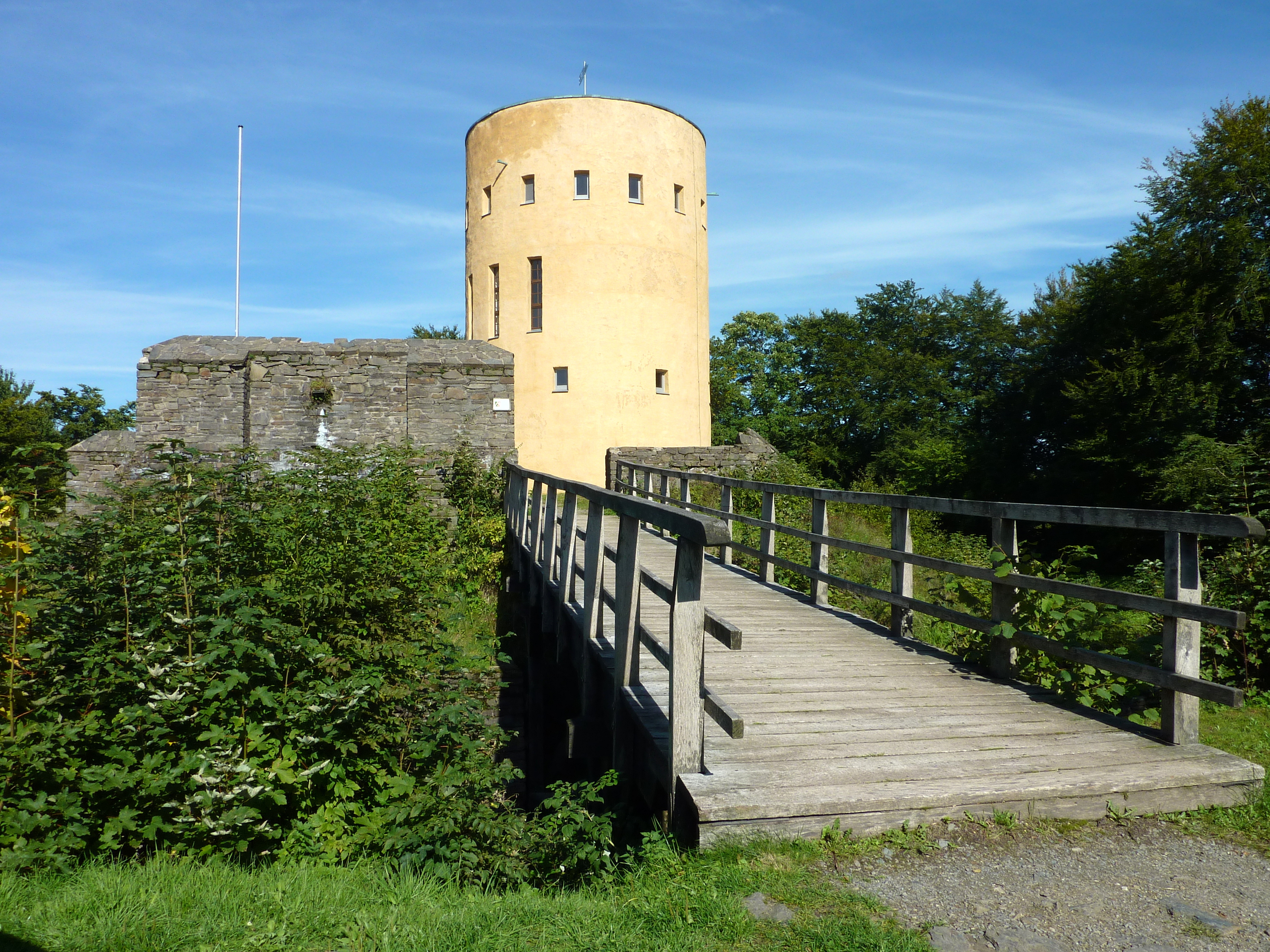
Ginsburg Castle. Photo: Frank Behnsen, 2010.

For the administration of justice, the county had a Schultheiß in most of the districts. The oldest preserved ordinance for the Schultheiß of the Dillenburg district is from 10 April 1465, which contains only a part of his tasks and authority. In 1498 there followed the joint justice ordinance for the districts of Siegen and Dillenburg, which contained the complete law of the time. This ordinance had to be read out loud to all citizens every year. In the ordinances of 1465 and 1498 the provisions on matrimonial law are prominently present. The Landgericht zum Oberhof zu Siegen was designated as the court of appeal. Until then the Reichshofgericht in Rottweil had been competent for appeals. In a decree of 8 June 1494, Roman King Maximilian I, released John from the obligation to go to Rottweil and to be subordinate to the Westphalian Landgerichter and vehmic courts. Because of the increasing "Rauben, Morden, Brennen und andere Gewalttätigkeiten" ("robbery, murder, arson and other acts of violence") and in order to be able to execute justice more quickly and effectively, John established a vehmic court on Ginsburg Castle. For the Blutgerichtsbarkeit (high jurisdiction) the Hochgericht was competent. The Ebersbach district had its own Hochgericht auf dem Stein. During the executions there, the count occasionally wielded the sword himself in order to behead the criminals. But mostly he left that to the executioners. Also the other punishments and fines, which the count himself imposed in special cases, to give an example, were not insignificant for the monetary value of the time. John also installed an Oberhofgericht in Hadamar.

The financial administration was still relatively simple; there was no distinction between the public and the private treasury of the count. All income flowed into the private treasury of the count. The count received the revenues from the farms in the villages in kind, which were supplied by the serfs working there. With the increase in coinage, which resulted in payments in kind being increasingly replaced by payments in money, the office of Rentmeister became more and more important. The count's fixed income included the Mai und Herbst Bede, which were levied on land tenure. There was also the Leibbede, a personal tax, which was levied when the serf died and had to be paid by his relatives. This originally consisted of the best piece of livestock, but was later replaced by a sum of money. Finally, there was a hearth tax, which had to be paid during Lent. The irregular revenues of the count included first of all the so-called Schatzungen, taxes for special expenses and emergencies. Then there was the income from tolls, which were often leased to subjects. This also applied to fishing rights, which the count owned. Taxes were also levied in the cities, on houses, gardens, fields and meadows. A not inconsiderable source of income for the Counts of Nassau has always been the iron toll. A charter of 1 April 1470 concerning the tariffs in Siegen, Netphen and Wilnsdorf lists the individual taxes for pig iron, steel, cast iron pans, metal sheets, scythes, cauldrons, etc. in detail. The expenses included the travels of the count and his family, celebrations at court, the remuneration of officials, court clothes, altar candles and communion wine, but especially the workmen and materials for construction work at the various castles. In 1481 John finished the expansion of Tringenstein Castle, which his father had started in 1472.

Early on after the death of his father, John was confronted with the accusations of Count Gerhard of Sayn, who accused him of interfering with and violating Sayn's sovereign rights in the parishes of Burbach and Neunkirchen. In the context of the settlement of their dispute in 1478, Gerhard and John agreed to make an arrangement regarding the purchase of ironstone and coal and the metallurgical industry in both lands. This is an example of John's obvious special interest in promoting the economy of his county. Historians speculate whether his interest in the economy was also linked to Nassau's advance into the County of Wittgenstein. Here, first of all, has to be thought of a section of the historic Eisenstraße in today's southern Westphalia, which reached into the Rothaar Mountains. For John this part of a cross-border route for iron apparently was a strategically and geographically important connection between the Siegerland and the neighbouring area along the Dill, in order to involve Wittgenstein in the economic process and to create new market opportunities for Nassau. In any case, this section of the Eisenstraße served as part of an important north–south connection or as part of a supra-regional traffic network within the Hessenstraße and the Kölnische Landstraße to connect the Siegerland with Electoral Cologne's Sauerland and the Nassau areas beyond the Kalteiche. The border disputes between the counties of Nassau and Wittgenstein in 1484 and 1515 imply that John apparently wanted to gain possession of a part of the Rothaar Mountains, presumably in order to control the trade traffic along this part of the Eisenstraße.

Of particular importance were certain toll agreements by the Wetterauer Grafenverein, which almost foreshadowed a Western toll union. This toll union had withstood political and territorial changes. Although in 1354 only half of the County of Nassau belonged to the Wetterau (the Siegerland had been allocated to the Westphalian district), the entire county benefited from the toll agreements because the count was a member of the Wetterauer Grafenverein. Within this toll union, a simple declaration was enough to transport provisions, fruit, grain, oat, meat, wine, butter, cheese and iron freely. The designation of iron as the only non-agricultural product shows the importance of this toll union for Nassau, and especially for the iron trade from the Siegerland. In 1515, a new expansion of the toll area led to the abolition of several Rhine tolls and opened the way for iron from the Siegerland to reach Antwerp and other markets where the people of the Siegerland, as subjects of Nassau, could take advantage of the more favourable market conditions. This expansion of the toll area even brought benefits for production, as the import duties for charcoal from Wittgenstein and the Freier Grund, (Note: "The Hickengrund or Freier Grund consisted of the regions Seelbach and Burbach (see Spielmann (1909), p. 119).") which partly belonged to the County of Sayn, were abolished.

A close relationship existed between John and his eldest sister Anne, who mainly resided in Celle through her marriage to Duke Otto II of Brunswick-Lüneburg in 1467. Based on the lively correspondence between her and John, it is even possible to reconstruct a trade exchange between Brunswick-Lüneburg and Nassau. In any case, the duchess regularly sent her relatives in Siegen and Dillenburg fresh or smoked salmon, eels and other North Sea delicacies such as salted sturgeon and plaice, while John sent his sister cast iron pans from Siegen in return.

In 1481, John fully succeeded in enforcing the still unfinished settlement of his first cousin Ottilie's claims to the County of Diez. This was confirmed in 1510. In 1485, Count Oswald I of Tierstein, Ottilie's second husband, attempted to murder John because of his dissatisfaction with the marriage grant and the settlement of the inheritance. The Rentmeister of Siegen, Heinrich Weiß, was able to prevent the attempt.

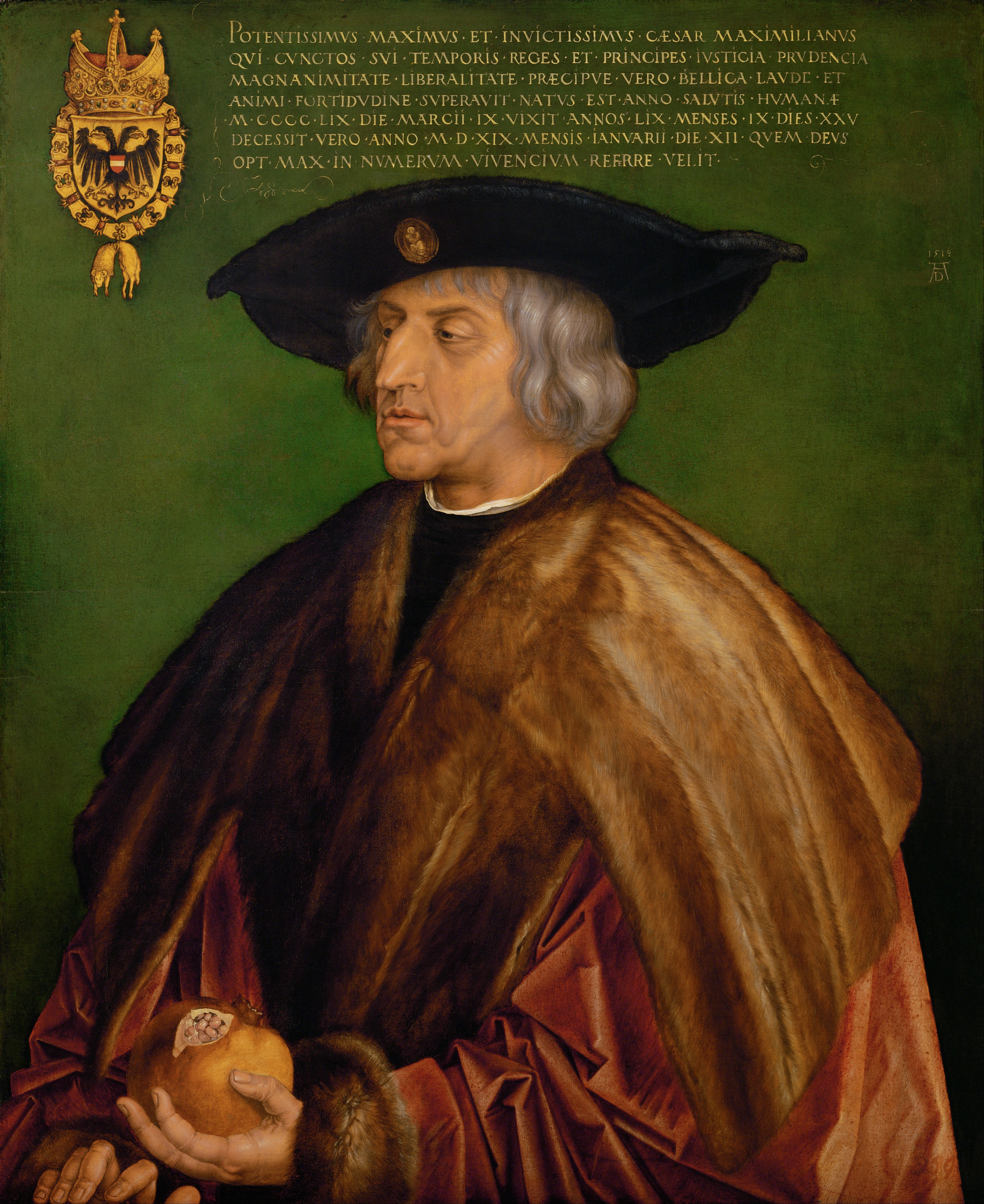
Roman King Maximilian I, later Emperor. Portrait by Albrecht Dürer, 1519. Kunsthistorisches Museum, Vienna.

In 1485, John renewed certain claims to the Duchy of Cleves and the County of Mark, for which he – in alliance with the Roman King Maximilian I, who was inclined to do so for other reasons – declared war on Duke John II of Cleves. However, it did not come to open hostilities, the disputes were settled, not without some benefits for John in hard cash. Like Maximilian I, whose election in Frankfurt and coronation in Aachen in 1486 John attended personally, he was a lover of medieval chivalry. Like Maximilian, he liked to take part in tournaments. In August 1480 he travelled with a large retinue to a tournament in Mainz. In 1483, before accepting an invitation to a tournament in Ingolstadt, the armour-maker Sitzhöfer in Frankfurt provided him with a completely new body armour with an 'iron hat' for 35 guilders, and another such body armour in 1494. In 1485 he rode to a third tournament in Ansbach, which by no means ended his participation in these chivalric exercises.

In his struggle with the von Bicken Family, John stood his ground, but this brought him the enmity of the powerful Landgraves of Hesse. By a treaty of 26 May 1486, he took off Wallenfels Castle and the Gericht Ebersbach from the von Bicken Family and left them only Hainchen Castle, subject to recognition of the territorial lord's rights. Thereby, the last local noble family in the county became subject to the Counts of Nassau. In 1511, the von Bicken Family still had to pledge not to admit any prince, count, free lord, knight, servant or anyone else to Hainchen Castle to the detriment of Nassau, and to keep the castle open only to the Counts of Nassau at all times.

At the Battle of Béthune in 1487, John's brother Engelbert was taken prisoner of war. John rushed to his brother's aid with cavalry, but had to liberate Engelbert with a ransom of 84,000 francs, for which the city of Siegen volunteered to pay a part. John had to repeat such a "reisiges gezüge" in February of the following year, when Engelbert was imprisoned in Bruges with Maximilian I. Engelbert then pledged the County of Vianden with St. Vith and Dasburg to John as compensation by treaty of 18 May 1489.

John managed to settle the Heinsbergische Erbfolgestreit with the Counts of Wied-Isenburg, which had already begun during his father's reign, by means of an agreement in 1488. Also worth mentioning is the conclusion of the so-called Treaty of Bertram (1494), an arrangement between John and the Electorate of Trier, mediated by Bertram von Nesselrode, concerning the common borders of the County of Diez and the Trierian counties of Limburg and Molsberg.

John also vigorously defended his territory against the Electorate of Cologne. The border disputes over alleged encroachments by Cologne's subjects against those of Nassau prompted him to ask Count Philip I of Nassau-Wiesbaden on 13 October 1497, for support against Cologne's intervention. In the same year, John strongly emphasised his demands and asked Archbishop Herman IV of Cologne (Note: Archbishop Herman IV of Cologne was an uncle of John's wife Elisabeth of Hesse-Marburg.) to reimburse him for the damage to the forest that the inhabitants of Brachthausen had left behind on Nassau territory. Should this wood crime continue, "und die von Brachthusen in ierem gewaltigen vurnemen wurden beharren, wurde ich geursacht, der gewalt zu sturen" ("and the people of Brachthausen will persist in their violent actions, I will be induced to resist with force"), John stated.

John protected and promoted mining by useful ordinances, among them the mining ordinance of 1489 and the justice ordinance of 1498. During his reign, the number of iron mines in the Siegerland increased from 25 to 40 and in the Dillenburg district to 10. The county's economic prospects were therefore positive. John also promoted the revival of trade by issuing numerous guild certificates. The cities of Herborn and Siegen enjoyed special support from him. He established scholarships for the intellectually gifted as early as 1499, long before other countries came up with the idea. In 1504, he issued ordinances for the craft of steel and blacksmiths as well as for the wool weavers' guild in the city of Siegen. And in 1511, John issued a church and school ordinance.

Because John's brother Engelbert had no legitimate children, he brought John's eldest son Henry to his court in Breda and Brussels in 1499, provided for his further education and appointed him his heir. After the death of his uncle in 1504, Henry succeeded him in all his possessions.

John was Stadtholder of Guelders and Zutphen in the period 1504–1505. "Umb seiner vernunft und schicklichkeit willen" ("due to his wisdom and propriety") Emperor Maximilian I appointed him an imperial councillor in 1505. In the same year, John attended the Imperial Diet in Cologne. Nevertheless, John took little part in imperial politics. His relationship with Maximilian was more of a personal one, established by his brother Engelbert's connection with Maximilian and John's assistance during Maximilian's imprisonment in Bruges. John concentrated mainly on the administration of his own counties.

=== Builder of churches and founder of a monastery ===
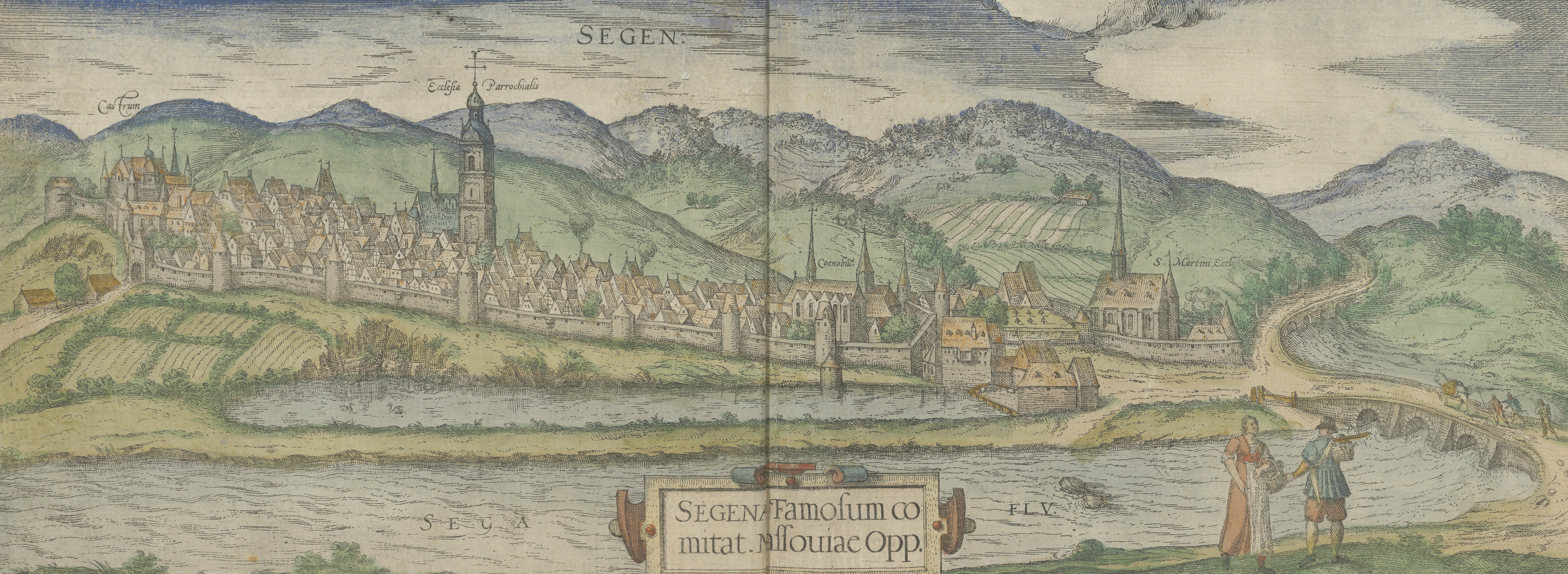
Siegen in 1617. From Braun & Hogenberg, Civitates orbis terrarum Band 6, Cologne, 1617. In the middle the St. John's Church of the Franciscan monastery (under the word Coenobiu). On the left the city castle and on the right St. Martin's Church.

In 1481 John had already built a church in Hadamar. John proved his piety by fulfilling a vow he probably made earlier and went on a pilgrimage to the Holy Land on 27 April 1484. On 31 January 1485 he returned safely in Dillenburg. Immediately after his return from Jerusalem – John arrived in Siegen on 3 February 1485 – he founded the Franciscan monastery in Siegen. Similar building plans had already been made by his father, John IV, who in 1473 received permission from Archbishop Adolf II of Mainz (Note: Archbishop Adolf II of Mainz descended from the Walramian Line of the House of Nassau, and was therefore a distant cousin of John IV and John V.) to use the income from St. John's Chapel in the Magdalene Monastery outside the city walls for the construction of a new Franciscan monastery. However, the project would only be carried out by his son John V, who, as a member of the Third Order of Saint Francis, was himself imbued with the ideals of this brotherhood. Pope Innocent VIII approved the construction of the monastery on 15 March 1486, and already on 12 February 1486, John concluded a trade agreement with the nobles Peter and Dietmar von Seelbach, in order to acquire a property in the Kölner Straße in Siegen, where the monastery and St. John's Church were to be built. He paid 6000 guilders for the construction of the monastery and even supported the monks by providing them with goods, firewood and books. An account from 1487 shows that on 13 July he was in Siegen, together with his equally God-fearing eldest sister Anne, to supervise the progress of the building activities. On 25 March 1489, eleven monks moved into the still unfinished Franciscan monastery in Siegen. The reason for the slow development was that, especially from 1489 onwards, John spent most of his time in the County of Vianden that his brother Engelbert had pledged to him. In order to get to know these new areas and to include them in his administration, John had to stay there for longer periods in the following years. Due to the circumstances in the Netherlands and the large sums of money that John again spent for his brother in these battles, the construction of the monastery in Siegen was undoubtedly stopped and it remained unfinished. The building activities were only resumed in 1493. In the course of the following years, the number of Franciscan monks in Siegen increased to about twenty, until the Franciscan monastery was dissolved during the Reformation in 1534 and the monks were expelled from Siegen.

Even today, various commemorative plaques in Siegen are reminders of John's lively building activities. A similar plaque can be found on the oldest parish church in Siegen, the St. Martin's Church, which was rebuilt from 1512 to 1517, and on the façade of the Karstadt department store opposite the courtyard of the Untere Schloss. There, a cast iron plate keeps alive the memory of "Johann V. Graf zu Nassau, Katzenelnbogen, Vianden und Diez, Herr zu Breda und Grimbergen", and the Franciscan monastery he founded with the St. John's Church, which were once located there. Until the destruction of the church by the great city fire of 1695, the crypt of St. John's Church also served as the burial place for the House of Nassau. These approximately 500-year-old walls, which today would be among the cultural and ecclesiastical sights of any town, especially from a tourist point of view, no longer exist. The crypt was irrevocably destroyed in the course of the construction of a new department store in Siegen in 1970.

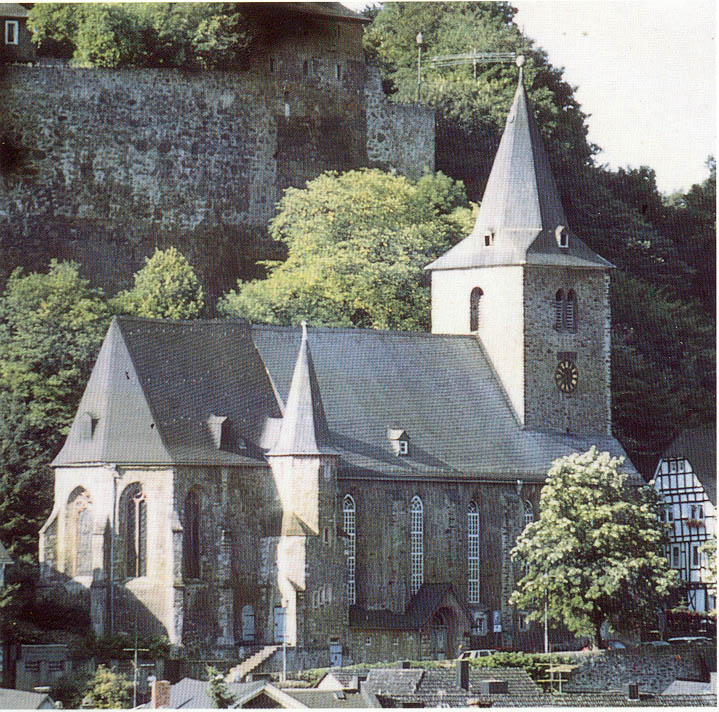
The Evangelische Stadtkirche in Dillenburg, 2014.

Dillenburg did not have its own parish church; the city and castle were part of the parish church in Feldbach. However, there was a chapel in the valley. At John's request, Archbishop John II of Trier, granted the inhabitants of the castle and the valley permission in a charter of 30 May 1477 to hold part of the services, such as masses and sermons, in this chapel. For the big celebrations, a visit to the parish church in Feldbach remained mandatory. The sacrament of baptism and burials could only take place there. Again at John's request, the archbishop moved the parish church with the right of baptism and the other sacraments from Feldbach to Dillenburg in a charter of 10 September 1490, where the count and the inhabitants were able to expand the chapel into a fully functioning church at their own expense. Only the churchyard remained in Feldbach, where John and his successors only had to take care of the continued existence of the church and regular services. If John and his successors wished, they could be buried in or near the new church in Dillenburg. Although John and the inhabitants of Dillenburg had to bear the construction costs of the church together, the latter had to bear the further maintenance and repair costs alone. It is likely that John assumed the major part of the building costs. The rebuilding of the chapel progressed so fast that the new city church could be consecrated already on 3 June 1491. It took until 1500 before the construction was completed.

=== Start of the Katzenelnbogische Erbfolgestreit ===
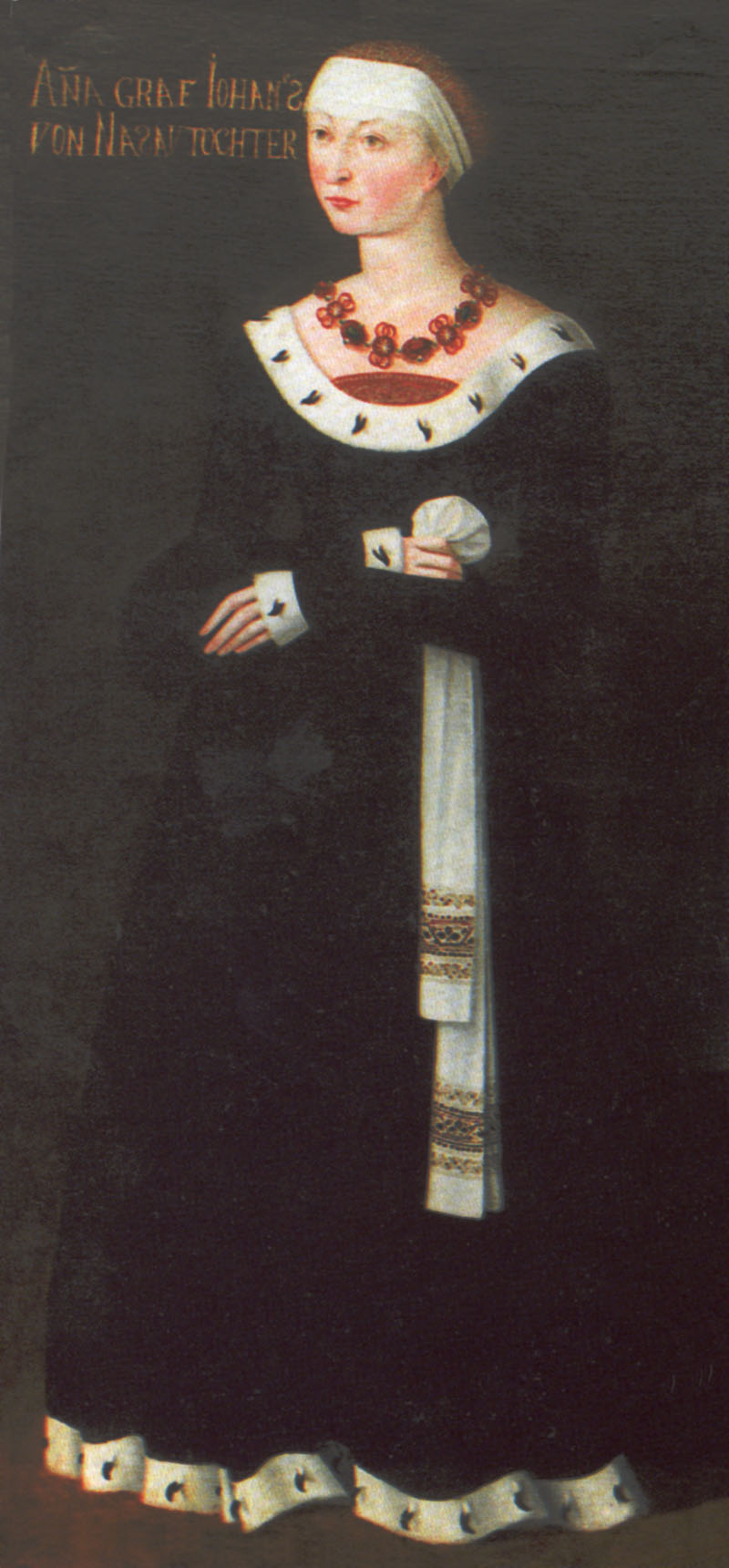
Anne of Nassau-Siegen, John's eldest sister. Anonymous portrait, c. 1460.

John's first cousin Ottilie of Nassau-Siegen was married to Philip the Younger of Katzenelnbogen, who died already in 1453. His brother Eberhard died three years later. The father of both, Count Philip the Elder of Katzenelnbogen, remarried in 1474, at the age of 72, to Countess Anne of Nassau-Siegen, John's 32 years old eldest sister. Since Philip the Elder was related to both the Landgraves of Hesse and the Counts of Nassau, he was able to mediate between the two during the conflict over the von Bicken Family. In the year of the marriage, an attempt was made to poison Anne. The perpetrator, a clergyman called Johann von Börnich, confessed on the rack that he had given the countess poisoned wine at supper and that he had been induced to do so by a high Hessian official. Because John instituted criminal proceedings against von Börnich, Hesse's reputation was dealt a heavy blow as an alleged instigator of murder.

The marriage of Philip the Elder and Anne of Nassau-Siegen remained childless so that, upon the death of Philip the Elder in 1479, the County of Katzenelnbogen was inherited by his daughter Anne and her husband Landgrave Henry III the Rich of Hesse-Marburg. They were succeeded by their son William III the Younger in 1483. The latter stipulated that his sisters Elisabeth, married to John since 1482, and Matilda should be compensated with 50,000 florins. John protested against this on behalf of his wife in 1488. At the time of the marriage John had renounced all claims to Elisabeth's inheritance, but with the exception of her mother's inheritance. William III the Younger died in 1500 without legitimate children. His Landgraviate of Hesse-Marburg was inherited by Landgrave William II the Middle of Hesse-Kassel. Matilda renounced her inheritance, so that her elder sister Elisabeth remained the sole heir to Katzenelnbogen. Indeed, Elisabeth laid claim to all her brother's possessions and John immediately assumed the title Count of Katzenelnbogen. But when the negotiations with William II the Middle of Hesse-Kassel began, he resigned that title. For both Hesse and Nassau, the County of Katzenelnbogen was a desirable inheritance, not only because of its wealth, but also because of its geographical location. The County of Katzenelnbogen was situated between the Taunus and the Lahn and was very rich due to the possession of a large number of Rhine tolls between Mainz and the border of the Netherlands. The county consisted of Rheinfels, Sankt Goar, Braubach, Hohenstein, Darmstadt, Zwingenberg, Rüsselsheim and Umstadt, as well as Eppstein, the district of Driedorf and parts of Diez, Hadamar, Ems, Löhnberg, Camberg, Altweilnau and Wehrheim. The last seven possessions were jointly owned with the Counts of Nassau.

On 24 May 1501, (Note: Joachim (1881), pp. 252–253 states the date 24 May 1500.) Emperor Maximilian I forbade William II the Middle to violate the County of Katzenelnbogen or to take violent steps against the House of Nassau. John also received some fiefs of Katzenelnbogen from the Duke of Jülich and the Abbey of Prüm. Tensions between Hesse and Nassau increased when William II the Middle took possession of Katzenelnbogen, disregarding the rights of Elisabeth. All of John's attempts to gain his wife's rights were in vain, despite several amicable negotiations. To settle the matter by force against the powerful House of Hesse did not occur to him. Therefore, John filed a complaint with the Reichskammergericht. In 1507 the court ruled that half the county should be awarded to Elisabeth. William II the Middle refused to accept this judgment. This led to a half-century-long, difficult and costly legal battle between Hesse and Nassau, known as the Katzenelnbogische Erbfolgestreit.

This succession dispute was of central importance for the expansion of the fortifications in the cities of Siegen, Dillenburg and Herborn. The lively building activity of John can still be admired today. He had Siegen Castle rebuilt around 1500. The fortifications at the Kölner Tor and the Obergraben in Siegen, which have since been restored and are a characteristic feature of the cityscape, were built on his initiative. However, the city treasury of Siegen was already under great pressure due to the count's building measures. The budgets of the three cities were heavily burdened by the first war preparations at the outbreak of the conflict with Hesse. Raw materials for war material were purchased, cannons and rifles were cast and then placed in visible positions on the wall towers and city gates. In the years 1500/01 to 1511/12, the city of Siegen spent an average of 1063.8 guilders on arms. In the period 1502 to 1512 more than 90 percent of the city's building expenditure, and thus more than 45 percent of the annual funds, went on military building projects. In the following decade (1510–1519), the city of Siegen spent only 353 guilders per year on military construction, which was still more than 33 percent of the average total annual expenditure of about 1060 guilders. On John's explicit orders, the city of Siegen started to buy lime and sand in 1501 for the construction of fortifications near the St. Martin's Church and to integrate them into the already existing fortifications. Although Siegen's city walls were first mentioned in a charter in 1311, the location of that parish church was still described as "extra muros" (i.e. outside the already existing city walls). Under John, enormous financial resources had to be raised in order to upgrade the bastions of the city of Siegen and to reinforce the city walls.

=== Last years, death, funeral and succession ===
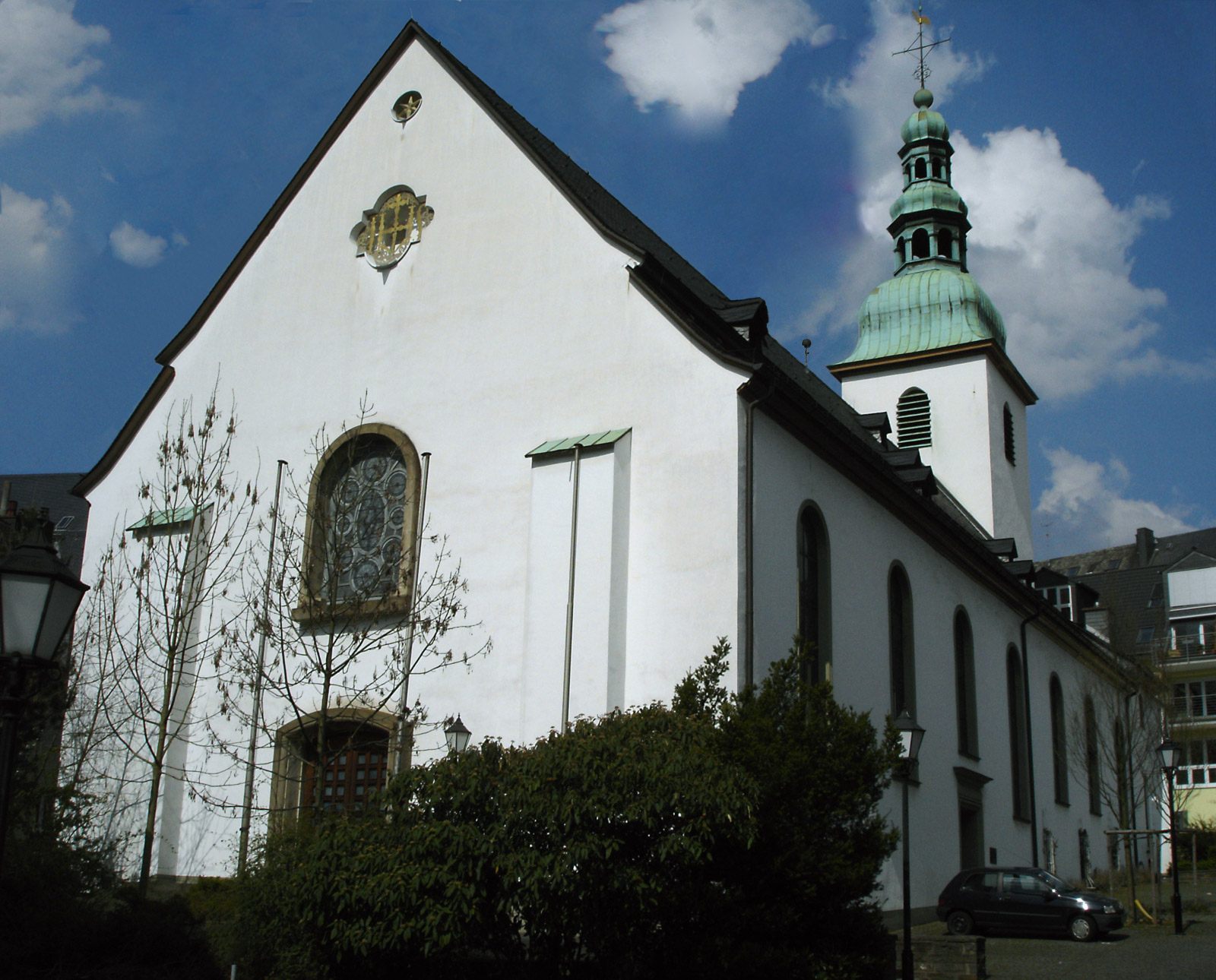
St. Mary's Church in Siegen. Photo: Bob Ionescu, 2005.

John seems to have made use of the Elector of Trier's personal physician Dr. Johann Rief, who spent weeks at his bedside in Siegen in January 1505 and was called in again in 1509, as the count was suffering from gout or another leg ailment. The treatment probably did not help much, however, because in April 1510 he had a priest come to him, presumably to bless his leg.

In John's last years, the first reports came about the large peasant revolts which, by the way, never overwhelmed the county, apparently because the local peasants had no complaints about their territorial lords.

John died in either Dillenburg or Siegen (Note: Schutte (1979), p. 42 and Dek (1970), p. 70 state Dillenburg as place of death, and Vorsterman van Oyen (1882), p. 95 states Dillenburg Castle. Assman & Menk (1996), however, state Siegen Castle as place of death and Joachim (1881), p. 253 states Siegen. Brachthäuser (2016), p. 8 does not mention a place of death at all.) on 30 July 1516 and was buried in the crypt of St. John's Church in the Franciscan monastery in Siegen, which he had founded. Both secular and ecclesiastical, John was still a true representative of the Middle Ages, and he had himself interred as a monk in grey habit. In 1836, he was reburied in St. Mary's Church in Siegen. John was succeeded by his son William I.

== John V and Elisabeth depicted on one of the Nassau tapestries? ==
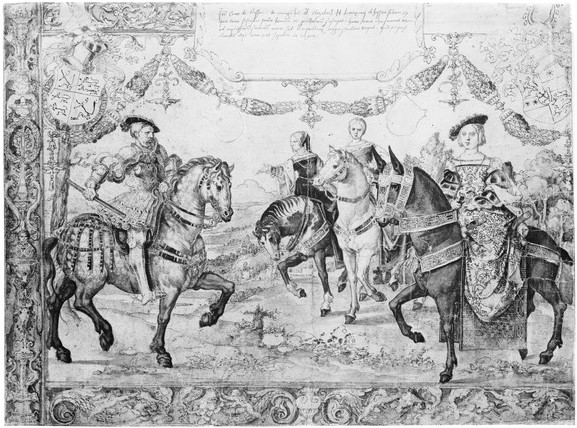
Design drawing by Bernard van Orley for the eighth tapestry in the series containing the genealogy of the House of Nassau, c. 1528–1530. Staatliche Graphische Sammlung München. Does this drawing depict John V and his wife Elisabeth? Or their son Henry III and his three wives?

Around 1531, the son of John V, Henry III, had a series of eight tapestries with the genealogy of the House of Nassau woven. These tapestries were lost in the 18th century. The design drawings for the tapestries were made by Bernard van Orley. Seven of those drawings have been preserved, only the design drawing for the fifth tapestry, depicting Count John I of Nassau-Siegen and Countess Margaret of the Mark, is missing. The theme of the series was the descent of the House of Nassau, whereby the dynastic significance was paramount. This genealogy was given extra splendour by the fact that, in addition to the direct descent from Count Otto I of Nassau, Roman King Adolf was also included in the series. On each tapestry, a man and woman sitting on horseback are depicted facing each other. The rather unusual composition remains lively due to the alternation in clothing and poses and the position of the horses. The mostly hilly landscape in the background is sometimes interrupted by trees in the foreground. The coats of arms in the top corners and the cartouche with the inscription in between are connected by garlands that stand out sharply against the sky. It is also clear from the designs for the first and last tapestry that the main scenes were surrounded by wide carpet borders. The drawings also show the great care taken with the inscriptions in the cartouches, which are written in the same hand on all seven of the surviving drawings, and with the heraldic details of the coats of arms. With the coats of arms, indications have been written in French about inaccuracies, especially about the mirror-image representation of the male arms. It is known that Henry III paid special attention to this aspect and corresponded with his brother William I about it. The design for the last tapestry in the series differs from the other designs in that it depicts three women instead of one. As the inscription does not mention the identity of the two women in the background, this has given rise to much speculation.

L.J. van der Klooster, curator of the topography department of the Netherlands Institute for Art History, argued that the design drawing for the last tapestry contains a clear mistake. The text in the cartouche indicates that depicted are John V and Elisabeth of Hesse-Marburg, the parents of the commissioner of the tapestries, Henry III. However, the horseman depicted in the drawing wears the collar of the Order of the Golden Fleece around his neck. The coat of arms in the corner of the drawing is also decorated with this collar. Now it is remarkable that John V was never a member of the Order of the Golden Fleece. So there is a contradiction between text and image. Since the discovery of the drawing in the Alte Pinakothek in Munich in 1904, it has been argued that the text in the inscription is incorrect and that the commissioner himself, Henry III of Nassau and his three wives are depicted in this drawing. The obvious collar of the Golden Fleece, the three female figures, being his wife Mencía de Mendoza and his two predeceased wives, as well as the strong resemblance of both Henry himself and Mencía to other portraits of that couple, indicated that.

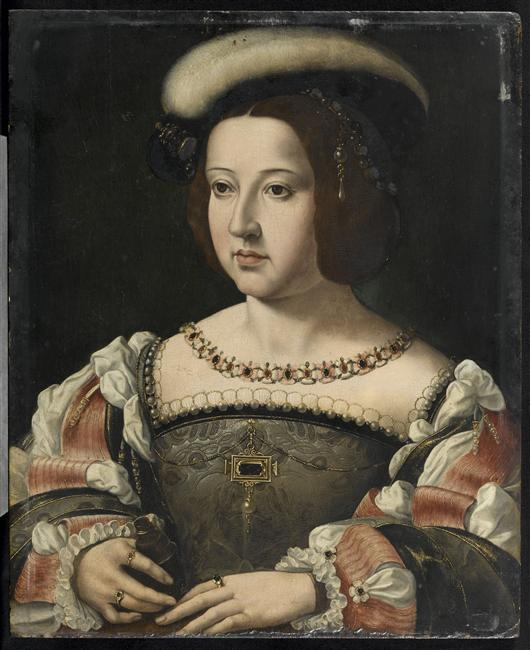
Mencía de Mendoza. Portrait by Jan Gossaert, 1500–1550. Musée Condé, Chantilly, Oise.

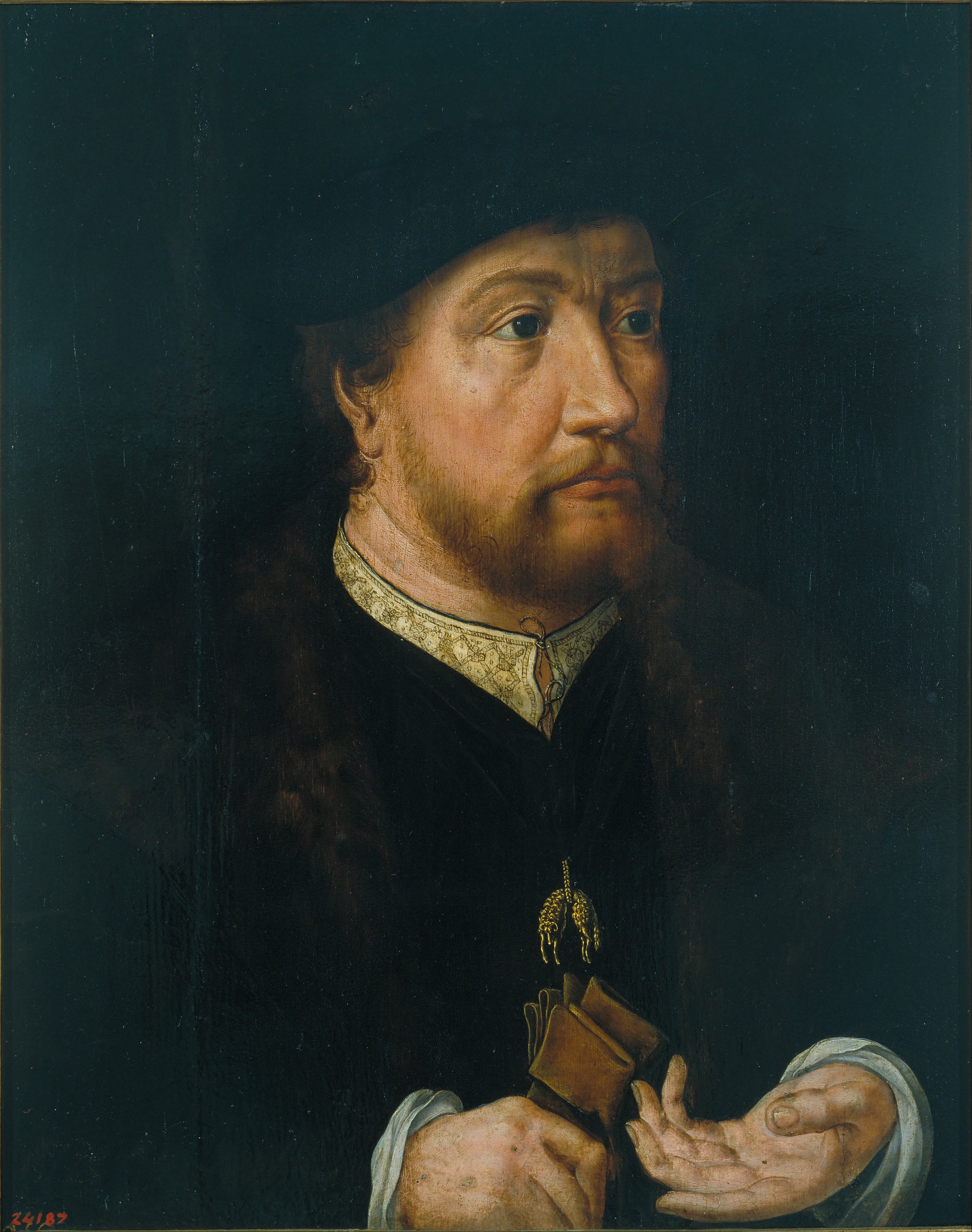
Count Henry III of Nassau-Breda. Portrait by Jan Gossaert, 1530–1532. Museu Nacional d'Art de Catalunya, Barcelona.

Van der Klooster argued that in a work of art, one should always start from the most original form of the object. In this drawing he stated, it is clear that the inscription in the cartouche, as well as the filling in of the shields, were added early, but somewhat later in the sixteenth century, because the colour of the paint indicates this. The drawing therefore originally had an empty cartouche and empty shields. The collar of the Order of the Golden Fleece around the shield does, however, belong to the first instance of the drawing. Van der Klooster also argued that there is an unmistakable portrait similarity between the horseman and his wife and some portraits of Henry III and Mencía de Mendoza, namely those by Jan Gossaert. Further Van der Klooster stated that the collar of the Order of the Golden Fleece which the horseman wears and which also hangs around his coat of arms marks him as a member of the order. According to the statutes, a Knight of the Golden Fleece was obliged to wear the insignia. Abuses were punished severely. John V has never been a Knight of the Golden Fleece, but Henry III had been since 1505. Van Orley, who worked for the court, must have been well aware of this rule. He could not afford to make a mistake. Van der Klooster stated this being the most essential point in his analysis.

Van der Klooster further stated that the portrait of Mencía in the drawing has acquired a permanent place in Spanish costume history. One could say that it followed the fashion of the international courtiers around Emperor Charles V. His sister Archduchess Eleanor is depicted in entirely similar attire in her portraits by Joos van Cleve. The German Elisabeth of Hesse-Marburg – of whom no portraits are known – must have been dressed according to a completely different fashion in her day. The so-called German hat and the wide cloak, often with a broad collar, determined the fashion image in the Northern European countries.

Of the nine women in the tapestries, eight are on horseback. Only the woman, whom Van der Klooster regards as Mencía de Mendoza, rides a mule. According to Van der Klooster, in those days, especially in Spain, the mule was considered the most suitable riding animal for women. When in September 1517 Emperor Charles V made his first journey to Spain in the company of a large retinue, among them Dutch chroniclers and artists, the party came into contact with the mule for the transport of the ladies. As far as Van der Klooster could ascertain, a woman riding a mule appeared for the first time in Dutch art on a print by Jacob Cornelisz van Oostsanen in the series Counts of Holland. However, this print is explicitly dated 1 April 1518. The artists who had accompanied the Emperor to Spain could have returned by now. The fact that, unlike the other countesses, the Spanish Mencía de Mendoza is the only one riding on a mule is therefore a factor in the identification according to Van der Klooster.

According to Van der Klooster, the series of tapestries relates to the genealogy of the House of Nassau, not to its possessions. The tapestry of Engelbert I and Joanne of Polanen does not allude to her rich heritage, including Breda, which was so important to Henry III. Van der Klooster admitted that against his view the fact speaks that the inscription in the cartouche explicitly states only as depicted: John V and his wife Elisabeth. Also, the original series of eight tapestries never included one depicting Henry III and his wives. In Van der Klooster's opinion, the error lies in the application of the inscription, for which he was unable to give an explanation. Therefore, the fate of this design drawing is that it will continue to carry an internal contradiction, according to Van der Klooster. His view of the proposed depicted persons led Van der Klooster to the hypothesis that around 1530 the idea of making a tapestry of the commissioner was considered. The series then would not have ended with his parents, but with Henry III. This in itself Van der Klooster considered a reasonable possibility. The series would then have consisted of nine and not eight tapestries. But Van der Klooster admitted that the present series, however, always consisted of eight tapestries, as the inventory of 19 July 1539 already mentions them: "huyt pieces de tapisserie de la genealogie de feu monseigneur du lignaige de Nassaw" ("eight pieces of tapestry of the genealogy of the late lord of the lineage of Nassau"). In Van der Klooster's view, the design drawing remains the only reminder of a probably unexecuted plan. The existence or non-existence of a ninth tapestry, according to Van der Klooster, is not relevant for the identification of the people, as this is only a design drawing.

C.W. Fock, Professor of the History of Applied Arts at the Institute of Art History of Leiden University, argued that there must be very conclusive reasons for opposing the inscription and the coat of arms shown on the drawing, precisely because it is so clear that much attention was paid to this aspect. The inscription is written in the same 16th century hand as on the other drawings, probably contemporary with the designs of the whole series. Moreover, all historical sources indicate that the last, eighth tapestry depicted John V and his wife and not the commissioner Henry III. Fock further argued that the face of the man indeed resembles portraits of Henry III. However, no portraits of John V are known and it is certainly possible that Henry had inherited the features of his father. A resemblance of the front woman to the portrait of Mencía de Mendoza is demonstrable, especially in the hairstyle; the facial features themselves are in fact not very individual. Apart from the hairstyle, the face of the second woman in the drawing hardly differs from that of the woman in the foreground.

Fock also pointed out that the view that the mule should be interpreted as a reference to Mencía's Spanish origin cannot be sustained. Already on the woodcut of 1518 by Jacob Cornelisz van Oostsanen with the counts and countesses of Holland, several women ride mules instead of horses. Nor can the braided band pattern on the cloth be interpreted as a clear reference to Spain. This motif, originally Arabic and Moorish, appeared almost simultaneously at the beginning of the 16th century in Italy, at the French court and in Germany, where artists such as Albrecht Dürer and Hans Holbein frequently used it. Van Orley, who was greatly impressed by Dürer, whom he also met during his journey through the Netherlands in 1521, may therefore have used this then very fashionable motif as a progressive artist for entirely different reasons. Fock did point out that the fact that John V, unlike his son, had no right to wear the collar of the Golden Fleece and to carry it with his coat of arms is a valid argument.

Fock continued to argue for the identification of the couple according to the inscription and the coats of arms as John V and Elisabeth, as it is known that the series of eight tapestries did not contain a tapestry depicting Henry III, accompanied by one or all three of his wives. The eighth tapestry must have depicted John V and Elisabeth. The inscriptions on the tapestries, known not only from the drawings but also from various written sources, indicate mainly the intention to glorify the deceased ancestors. Apart from emphasising their good and heroic deeds, the succession within the family, which repeatedly did not go through the eldest son, is also explained several times. In this context, the texts also mention other family members who are not depicted, such as the eldest son Adolf I in the fifth tapestry, the second son Henry II in the sixth tapestry, and the eldest son Engelbert II in the seventh tapestry. In the last tapestry, the two sons of John V – Henry III and William I – are mentioned in the same way, which is reason enough to assume that it was not the intention to depict them on a tapestry, let alone glorify them. In addition, the inscriptions strongly emphasise on the possessions brought in by the woman. In Fock's opinion, this also holds the key to the identification of the two unknown women, which is related to the inheritance of the County of Katzenelnbogen, which was so important for Nassau at the time. The inscription on the drawing lists John's wife as Elisabeth, daughter of the Landgrave of Hesse. It is striking and indicative of the importance of her claim to the County of Katzenelnbogen that this very wording was changed during the execution on the eighth tapestry and she was referred to as the daughter of the Countess of Katzenelnbogen.

At the time of the creation of the tapestries, the Katzenelnbogische Erbfolgestreit was a very important issue for the Nassaus. According to Fock the tapestry seems to allude to this, by depicting Elisabeth's sister Matilda in the background to the left of Elisabeth, who had left the inheritance to Elisabeth. The older woman on the left must be the older sister of John V, Anne, who was married to the last Count of Katzenelnbogen and, although she had no legal standing in the matter, through her marriage provided moral support for the claims of the Nassau dynasty. This solution, Fock argued, corresponds best to the intention of the tapestries to emphasise the dynastic importance and territorial claims of the family.

More importantly, in Fock's opinion, the ages of the two women in the background, where there is clearly a generation gap between the woman on the left and the two others, are also correct; this is in contrast to the ages of Henry III's three wives. His first wife, Françoise Louise of Savoy-Vaud, was born before 1486, the second wife, Claudia of Chalon, in 1498, and the third wife, Mencía de Mendoza, in 1508, which according to Fock is in no way consistent with the respective ages of the three women in the design drawing; the first two women both died at a young age. Moreover, Fock argued, one may seriously doubt whether, if it had been the three wives of Henry III, the two first wives would not have been treated in a more equal way instead of being treated in such a secondary manner. Through Claudia of Chalon, the Principality of Orange had just passed to Henry's son in 1530, such an honour for the family that it is almost inconceivable in Fock's view, that it would not have expressed in some form in the tapestry, if only in a prominent position also for Claudia of Chalon. This identification also explains – something that in Fock's opinion would otherwise be inexplicable with all the attention paid to the coats of arms – that the two shields of the women in the background were left blank. Anne of Nassau had the same coat of arms as her brother John V and Matilda of Hesse the same as her sister Elisabeth. The indicated coats of arms of John and Elisabeth were therefore enough of a clue. Moreover, the two blank shields are partly painted over with white (it shows through a bit now), which could even indicate that the coats of arms would be left out in second instance.

On the website of the Netherlands Institute for Art History (the former employer of Van der Klooster) it is stated that the picture depicts Henry III with his wife Mencía de Mendoza and two deceased wives. It is also stated there that he was previously identified as his father John V on the basis of a later added erroneous inscription and coat of arms. Finally it states that the identification as Henry III is on the basis of the portrait of Mencía de Mendoza, her Spanish mule, the Order of the Golden Fleece and the 'three wives'.

== Marriage and issue ==
John married in Marburg on 11 February 1482 to Landgravine Elisabeth of Hesse-Marburg (Marburg, May 1466 – Cologne, 17 January 1523 (Note: Schutte (1979), p. 42 states the date 7 or 17 January 1523.)), daughter of Landgrave Henry III the Rich of Hesse-Marburg and Countess Anne of Katzenelnbogen.

From the marriage of John and Elisabeth the following children were born:

1. Count Henry III (Siegen, 12 January 1483 – Breda Castle, 14 September 1538), succeeded his uncle Engelbert II in 1504. Married:
  1. on 3 August 1503 to Countess Françoise Louise of Savoy-Vaud (1485 – 17 September 1511);
  2. in La-Fère-sur-Oise on 24 April 1515 to Claudia of Chalon (1498 – Diest, 31 May 1521);
  3. in Burgos on 30 June 1524 to Mencía de Mendoza y Fonseca (Jadraque (?), 1 December 1508 – 4 January 1554), 2nd Marchioness of Cenete since 3 June 1523.
2. John (Tringenstein Castle, 3 November 1484 – 15 August 1504?).
3. Ernest (Dillenburg, 9 April 1486 – 12 October 1486).
4. Count William I the Rich (Dillenburg, 10 April 1487 – Dillenburg Castle, 6 October 1559), succeeded his father in 1516. Married:
  1. in Koblenz on 29 May 1506 (Note: Becker (1983), p. 55 states the wedding date Sonntag Cantate (10.5.) 1506. Sonntag Cantate is the fourth Sunday after Easter. In 1506, Easter fell on 19 April and 10 May was only the third Sunday after Easter. Dek (1968), p. 228 and Vorsterman van Oyen (1882), p. 98 state the wedding date 29 October 1506.) to Countess Walburga of Egmont (Note: Given name in accordance with Lück (1981), p. 41 and Dek (1970), p. 72. The given name Walburgis in Van Ditzhuyzen (2004), p. 249 and Schutte (1979), p. 43, Walpurgis in Becker (1983), p. 55, Walburgia in Dek (1968), p. 228, and Walburg in Vorsterman van Oyen (1882), p. 98.) (c. 1489 – 7 March 1529);
  2. in Siegen Castle (Note: Van Ditzhuyzen (2004), p. 249, on the other hand, states that the wedding took place in Königstein (Taunus).) on 20 September 1531 to Countess Juliane of Stolberg-Wernigerode (Stolberg, 15 February 1506 – Dillenburg, 18 June 1580).
5. Elisabeth (1488 – Dillenburg, 3 June 1559), married in Siegen in February 1506 to Count John III of Wied (1485 (Note: The year of birth 1485 is stated by Schutte (1979), p. 42, and Dek (1970), p. 71. However, his mother's date of death is stated as 12 March 1478 by Stammtafel des mediatisierten Hauses Wied. Which of these two dates is incorrect is unclear.) – 18 May 1533).
6. Mary (Vianden, February 1491 – Siegen, 1547 (Note: The year of death 1543 in Vorsterman van Oyen (1882), p. 97.)), married in Siegen in February 1506 to Count Jobst I of Holstein-Schauenburg-Pinneberg (1483 – 5 June 1531 (Note: The date of death 5 June 1532 in Vorsterman van Oyen (1882), p. 97.)).

The double wedding of Elisabeth and Mary was held at Siegen Castle. A banquet was also held in the city hall in Siegen at which both brides and grooms were present. The feast with the city magistrates was paid for by the brides' father and the city council donated 16 oxen and 19 pigs for the feast. On 16 February 1506, the "Beilager" of the two sisters was celebrated in Dillenburg with the greatest of festivities. The purchase of gold fabric for 747 guilders and silk fabric for 396 guilders at the trade fair in Mainz for these celebrations and the wedding of their brother William in Koblenz in May 1506, as well as the unusually high total expenditure of 13,505 guilders in the accounts of 1505/1506, show that these weddings must have been splendid events.

== Ancestors ==
Ancestors of Count John V of Nassau-Siegen
Great-great-grandparents	Otto II of Nassau-Siegen (c. 1305–1350/51) ⚭ 1331; Adelaide of Vianden (d. 1376)	Adolf II of the Mark (d. 1347) ⚭ 1332; Margaret of Cleves (d. after 1348)	John II of Polanen (d. 1378) ⚭ 1348; Oda of Horne (d. before 1353)	John II of Salm (d. after 1400) ⚭ after 1355; Philippa of Valkenburg (?–?)	John I of Heinsberg (d. 1334) ⚭ c. 1324; Catherine of Voorne (d. 1366)	William I of Jülich (d. 1362) ⚭ 1324; Joanna of Hainaut (1311/13–1374)	Bernhard of Solms (d. 1347/49) ⚭ ? (?–?)	Philip VI of Falkenstein (d. 1372/73) ⚭ before 1363; Agnes of Falkenstein (d. 1380)
Great-grandparents	John I of Nassau-Siegen (c. 1339–1416) ⚭ 1357; Margaret of the Mark (d. 1409)		John III of Polanen (d. 1394) ⚭ 1390; Odilia of Salm (d. 1428)		Godfrey II of Heinsberg (d. 1395) ⚭ 1357; Philippa of Jülich (d. 1390)		Otto I of Solms (d. 1410) ⚭ Agnes of Falkenstein (c. 1358–1409)	
Grandparents	Engelbert I of Nassau-Siegen (c. 1370–1442) ⚭ 1403; Joanne of Polanen (1392–1445)				John II of Looz-Heinsberg (d. 1438) ⚭ 1423; Anne of Solms (d. 1433)			
Parents	John IV of Nassau-Siegen (1410–1475) ⚭ 1440; Mary of Looz-Heinsberg (1424–1502)							

== Sources ==
- Aßmann, Helmut & Menk, Friedhelm (1996). Auf den Spuren von Nassau und Oranien in Siegen (in German). Siegen: Gesellschaft für Stadtmarketing Siegen e.V.
- Becker, E. (1983) [1950]. Schloss und Stadt Dillenburg. Ein Gang durch ihre Geschichte in Mittelalter und Neuzeit. Zur Gedenkfeier aus Anlaß der Verleihung der Stadtrechte am 20. September 1344 herausgegeben (in German) (Neuauflage ed.). Dillenburg: Der Magistrat der Stadt Dillenburg.
- Brachthäuser, Christian (1 October 2016). "Kloster, Krypta, Kontroversen. Zum 500. Todesjahr des Siegener Landesherrn Johann V. Graf zu Nassau, Katzenelnbogen, Vianden und Diez, Herr Breda, Grimbergen und Diest (1455–1516)" (PDF). Universitätsstadt Siegen.
- Dek, A.W.E. (1970). Genealogie van het Vorstenhuis Nassau (in Dutch). Zaltbommel: Europese Bibliotheek.
- Van Ditzhuyzen, Reinildis (2004) [1992]. Oranje-Nassau. Een biografisch woordenboek (in Dutch) (3rd ed.). Haarlem: Becht. ISBN 90-230-1124-4.
- Fock, C.W. (1996). "Teruggevonden ontwerpen voor de tapijtreeks De Nassause Genealogie". In Van der Klooster, L.J.; Tiethoff-Spliethoff, M.E. & Tamse, C.A. (eds.). Jaarboek Oranje-Nassau Museum 1995 (in Dutch). Rotterdam: Barjesteh, Meeuwes & Co Historische Uitgeverij. pp. 39–56. ISBN 90-73714-23-0.
- Huberty, Michel; Giraud, Alain & Magdelaine, F. & B. (1981). l'Allemagne Dynastique (in French). Vol. Tome III: Brunswick-Nassau-Schwarzbourg. Le Perreux: Alain Giraud. ISBN 2-901138-03-9.
- Jansen, H.P.H. (1979). "De Bredase Nassaus". In Tamse, C.A. (ed.). Nassau en Oranje in de Nederlandse geschiedenis (in Dutch). Alphen aan den Rijn: A.W. Sijthoff. pp. 11–40. ISBN 90-218-2447-7.
- Joachim, Ernst (1881). "Johann V. von Nassau-Dillenburg". Allgemeine Deutsche Biographie (in German). Vol. Band 14. Leipzig: Duncker & Humblot. pp. 252–254.
- Van der Klooster, L.J. (1996). "Johan V of Hendrik III afgebeeld op een van de ontwerpen voor de Nassause tapijten". In Van der Klooster, L.J.; Tiethoff-Spliethoff, M.E. & Tamse, C.A. (eds.). Jaarboek Oranje-Nassau Museum 1995 (in Dutch). Rotterdam: Barjesteh, Meeuwes & Co Historische Uitgeverij. pp. 57–66. ISBN 90-73714-23-0.
- Lück, Alfred (1981) [1967]. Siegerland und Nederland (in German) (2nd ed.). Siegen: Siegerländer Heimatverein e.V.
- Schutte, O. (1979). "Genealogische gegevens". In Tamse, C.A. (ed.). Nassau en Oranje in de Nederlandse geschiedenis (in Dutch). Alphen aan den Rijn: A.W. Sijthoff. pp. 40–44. ISBN 90-218-2447-7.
- Spielmann, Christian (1909). Geschichte von Nassau (Land und Haus) von den ältesten Zeiten bis zur Gegenwart (in German). Vol. Teil 1. Politische Geschichten. Wiesbaden: P. Plauen.
- Vorsterman van Oyen, A.A. (1882). Het vorstenhuis Oranje-Nassau. Van de vroegste tijden tot heden (in Dutch). Leiden & Utrecht: A.W. Sijthoff & J.L. Beijers.
- "Bernard van Orley. Hendrik III van Nassau (1483-1538) with his wife Mencia de Mendoza (1508-1554) and two deceased wives, ca. 1528-1530". RKD – Netherlands Institute for Art History.

John V of Nassau-Siegen House of Nassau-Siegen Born: 9 November 1455 Died: 30 July 1516
Regnal titles
Preceded by John IV	Count of Nassau-Siegen; 3 February 1475 – 30 July 1516	Succeeded by William I the Rich
Preceded by John IV	Count of Diez; 3 February 1475 – 30 July 1516	Succeeded by William I the Rich
Political offices
Preceded by –	Stadtholder of Guelders and Zutphen; 1504 – 1505	Succeeded by Philip of Burgundy-Blaton
