= Elisabeth of Nassau-Siegen (1488–1559) =

German countess (1488–1559)

- Countess Consort of Wied
- Coat of arms
- Full name: Elisabeth Countess of Nassau-Siegen
- Native name: Elisabeth Gräfin von Nassau-Siegen
- Born: Elisabeth Gräfin zu Nassau, Vianden und Diez; 1488
- Died: 3 June 1559; Dillenburg
- Noble family: House of Nassau-Siegen
- Spouse: John III of Wied
- Issue Detail: Philip; John IV; Frederick; Magdalene; Margaret; Walpurga; Agnes; Genoveva; Mary; Elisabeth
- Father: John V of Nassau-Siegen
- Mother: Elisabeth of Hesse-Marburg

Countess Elisabeth of Nassau-Siegen (Note: In many sources she is called Elisabeth of Nassau-Dillenburg. The County of Nassau-Siegen is erroneously called Nassau-Dillenburg in many sources. The county was not named after the small, unimportant city of Dillenburg, which did not even have a church until 1491, but after the, for that time, large city of Siegen, the economic centre of the county and the counts' main residence. See Lück (1981), passim. It is also evident from the numbering of the reigning counts with the given name John. One John without regal number who ruled the County of Nassau-Dillenburg in the period 1303–1328, and eight counts by the name of John who ruled the County of Nassau-Siegen in the period 1362–1638.) (1488 – 3 June 1559), German: Elisabeth Gräfin von Nassau-Siegen, official titles: Gräfin zu Nassau, Vianden und Diez, was a countess from the House of Nassau-Siegen, a cadet branch of the Ottonian Line of the House of Nassau, and through marriage Countess of Wied.

== Biography ==
Elisabeth was born in 1488 as the eldest daughter and fifth child of Count John V of Nassau-Siegen and his wife Landgravine Elisabeth of Hesse-Marburg.

Elisabeth married in February 1506 to Count John III of Wied (1485 (Note: The year of birth 1485 is mentioned by Schutte (1979), p. 42, and Dek (1970), p. 71. However, his mother's date of death is stated as 12 March 1478 by Stammtafel des mediatisierten Hauses Wied. Which of these two dates is incorrect is unclear.) – 18 May 1533). It was a double wedding, on the same day Elisabeth's younger sister Mary married to Count Jobst I of Holstein-Schauenburg-Pinneberg. The double wedding of Elisabeth and Mary was held at Siegen Castle. A banquet was also held in the city hall in Siegen at which both brides and grooms were present. The feast with the city magistrates was paid for by the brides' father and the city council donated 16 oxen and 19 pigs for the feast. On 16 February 1506, the ʻBeilagerʼ of the two sisters was celebrated in Dillenburg with the greatest of festivities. The purchase of gold fabric for 747 guilders and silk fabric for 396 guilders at the trade fair in Mainz for these celebrations and the wedding of their brother William in Koblenz in May 1506, as well as the unusually high total expenditure of 13,505 guilders in the accounts of 1505/1506, show that these weddings must have been splendid events.

Elisabeth's husband was the son of Count Frederick IV and Countess Agnes of Virneburg. John succeeded his father together with his brother William III, who relinquished all his rights to the County of Wied to John in 1505. The year later John's brothers, who were clergymen, also renounced their rights to him. Elisabeth's mother-in-law was a niece of Countess Genoveva of Virneburg, who was married to Count Henry II of Nassau-Siegen, Elisabeth's great uncle. Elisabeth's husband died in 1533 and was succeeded by their son John IV.

Elisabeth's brother-in-law archbishop Herman V of Cologne tried in vain to bring the Archbishopric of Cologne to the Reformation, but had then been deposed by papal bull. He then went to Siegen to seek the advice of Elisabeth's brother Count William I the Rich of Nassau-Siegen, and asked him to put in a good word for him with Emperor Charles V. With the Wied Family, the archbishop spent several weeks in Siegen.

Elisabeth died in Dillenburg on 3 June 1559, where she no doubt was to attend the triple wedding of her nephew John and nieces Anne and Elisabeth, which took place a few days later.

== Issue ==
From the marriage of Elisabeth and John the following children were born:

1. Philip (d. 1535).
2. Count John IV (d. 15 June 1581), succeeded his father as Count of Wied in 1533. He married in February 1543 to Countess Catherine of Hanau-Münzenberg (Note: She was a daughter of Count Philip II of Hanau-Münzenberg and Countess Juliana of Stolberg-Wernigerode. The latter later remarried Elisabeth's brother Count William I the Rich.) (26 March 1525 – after 15 June 1581).
3. Frederick (d. 23 December 1568), was elected archbishop Frederick IV of Cologne on 19 November 1562, he resigned in 1567.
4. Magdalene (d. 23 May 1572), Abbess of Elten Abbey.
5. Margaret (d. 5 August 1571). She married:
  1. on 29 September 1523 to Count Bernhard of Bentheim-Steinfurt (d. 1528).
  2. in 1534 to Count Arnold of Manderscheid-Blankenheim (14 November 1500 – 6 May 1548).
6. Walpurga (d. 3 October 1578), married in 1528 to Count Louis of Stolberg-Königstein (Stolberg, 13 January 1505 – Wertheim, 24 August 1574).
7. Agnes (d. Sonnewalde, 24 March 1588). She married:
  1. in Siegen, 28 August 1539 to Count Caspar of Mansfeld-Hinterort (d. in Hungary, 26 October 1542).
  2. in Dierdorf on 11 July 1545 to Count Frederick Magnus of Solms-Laubach (1 October 1521 – Laubach, 13 January 1561).
8. Genoveva (d. 26 June 1556), married in 1546 to Count Wolfgang of Stolberg-Wernigerode (Stolberg, 1 October 1501 – Allstedt, 8 March 1552).
9. Mary (d. 15 March 1563), married on 1 September 1554 to Christoph Reichserbschenk, Semperfrei und Herr zu Limpurg-Gaildorf (12 July 1541 – Obersontheim, 3 September 1574).
10. Elisabeth (d. 24 July 1542), married in 1522 to Count Anton of Isenburg-Büdingen-Kelsterbach (1501 – 1560).

== Ancestors ==
Ancestors of Elisabeth of Nassau-Siegen
Great-great-grandparents	John I of Nassau-Siegen (c. 1339–1416) ⚭ 1357; Margaret of the Mark (d. 1409)	John III of Polanen (d. 1394) ⚭ 1390; Odilia of Salm (d. 1428)	Godfrey II of Heinsberg (d. 1395) ⚭ 1357; Philippa of Jülich (d. 1390)	Otto I of Solms (d. 1410) ⚭ Agnes of Falkenstein (c. 1358–1409)	Herman II the Scholar of Hesse (c. 1342–1413) ⚭ 1383; Margaret of Nuremberg (c. 1363–1406)	Frederick I the Belligerent of Saxony (1370–1428) ⚭ 1402; Catherine of Brunswick-Lüneburg (d. 1442)	John III of Katzenelnbogen (d. 1444) ⚭ 1383; Anne of Katzenelnbogen (d. 1439)	Eberhard IV the Younger of Württemberg (1388–1419) ⚭ 1397/98; Henriette of Montbéliard (1387–1444)
Great-grandparents	Engelbert I of Nassau-Siegen (c. 1370–1442) ⚭ 1403; Joanne of Polanen (1392–1445)		John II of Looz-Heinsberg (d. 1438) ⚭ 1423; Anne of Solms (d. 1433)		Louis III the Peaceful of Hesse (1402–1458) ⚭ 1433; Anne of Saxony (1420–1462)		Philip the Elder of Katzenelnbogen (c. 1402–1479) ⚭ 1422; Anne of Württemberg (1408–1471)	
Grandparents	John IV of Nassau-Siegen (1410–1475) ⚭ 1440; Mary of Looz-Heinsberg (1424–1502)				Henry III the Rich of Hesse-Marburg (1440–1483) ⚭ 1458; Anne of Katzenelnbogen (1443–1494)			
Parents	John V of Nassau-Siegen (1455–1516) ⚭ 1482; Elisabeth of Hesse-Marburg (1466–1523)							

== Sources ==
- Aßmann, Helmut & Menk, Friedhelm (1996). Auf den Spuren von Nassau und Oranien in Siegen (in German). Siegen: Gesellschaft für Stadtmarketing Siegen e.V.
- Becker, E. (1983) [1950]. Schloss und Stadt Dillenburg. Ein Gang durch ihre Geschichte in Mittelalter und Neuzeit. Zur Gedenkfeier aus Anlaß der Verleihung der Stadtrechte am 20. September 1344 herausgegeben (in German) (Neuauflage ed.). Dillenburg: Der Magistrat der Stadt Dillenburg.
- Dek, A.W.E. (1968). "De afstammelingen van Juliana van Stolberg tot aan het jaar van de Vrede van Münster". Spiegel der Historie. Maandblad voor de geschiedenis der Nederlanden (in Dutch). 1968 (7/8): 228–303.
- Dek, A.W.E. (1970). Genealogie van het Vorstenhuis Nassau (in Dutch). Zaltbommel: Europese Bibliotheek.
- Huberty, Michel; Giraud, Alain & Magdelaine, F. & B. (1981). l'Allemagne Dynastique (in French). Vol. Tome III: Brunswick-Nassau-Schwarzbourg. Le Perreux: Alain Giraud. ISBN 2-901138-03-9.
- Lück, Alfred (1981) [1967]. Siegerland und Nederland (in German) (2nd ed.). Siegen: Siegerländer Heimatverein e.V.
- Schutte, O. (1979). "Genealogische gegevens". In Tamse, C.A. (ed.). Nassau en Oranje in de Nederlandse geschiedenis (in Dutch). Alphen aan den Rijn: A.W. Sijthoff. pp. 40–44. ISBN 90-218-2447-7.
- Vorsterman van Oyen, A.A. (1882). Het vorstenhuis Oranje-Nassau. Van de vroegste tijden tot heden (in Dutch). Leiden & Utrecht: A.W. Sijthoff & J.L. Beijers.
- Stammtafel des mediatisierten Hauses Wied (in German). 1884.

Elisabeth of Nassau-Siegen (1488–1559) House of Nassau-Siegen Born: 1488 Died: 3 June 1559
Regnal titles
Vacant Title last held by Agnes of Virneburg	Countess Consort of Wied; February 1506 – 3 June 1559	Vacant Title next held by Catherine of Hanau-Münzenberg
