= Willemijn Fock =

Dutch art historian (1942–2021)

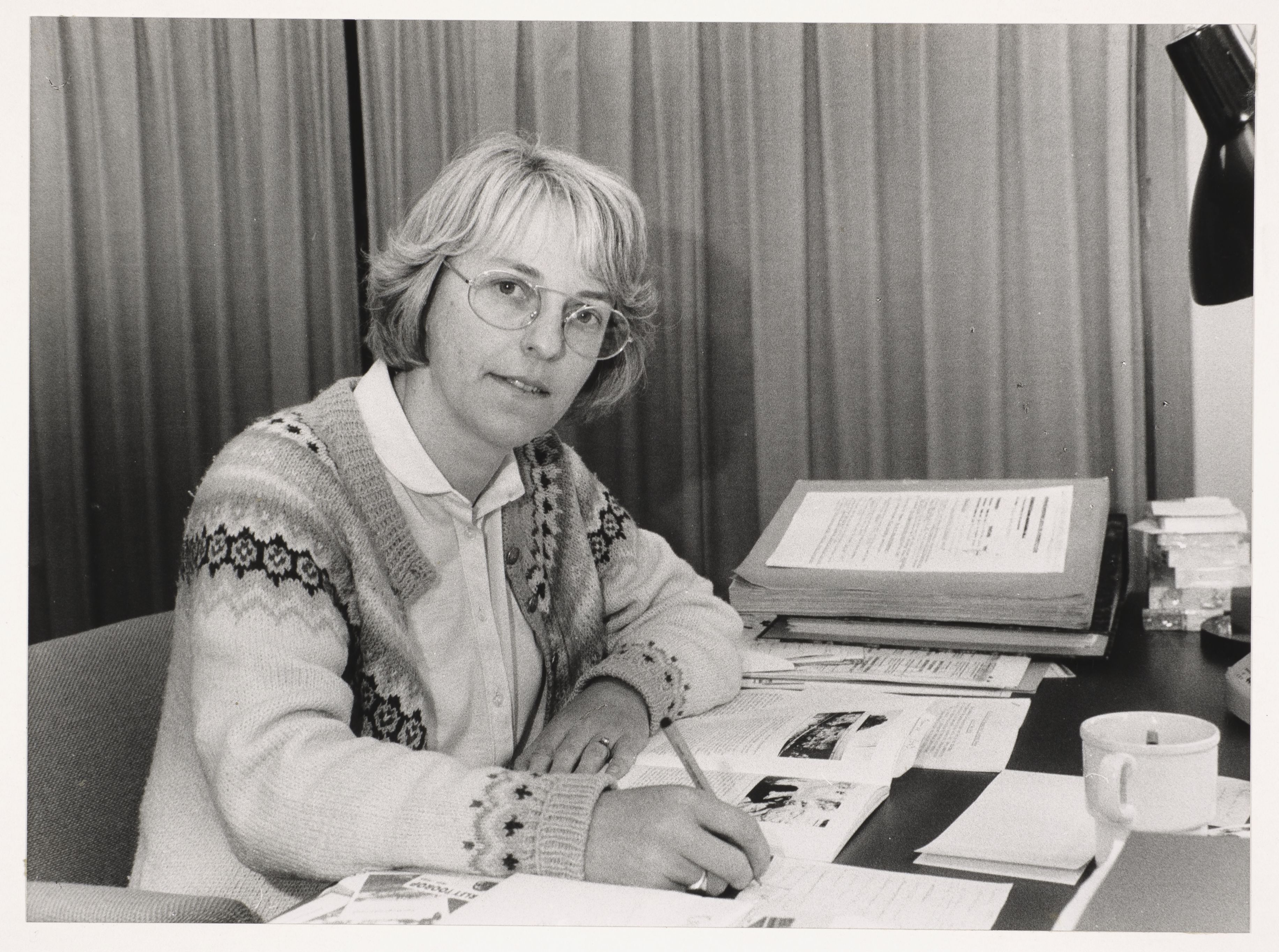
- C. Willemijn Fock
- Born: Cornelia Wilhelmina Fock; 25 June 1942; Soerabaja, Dutch East Indies
- Died: 3 June 2021 (aged 78); The Hague, Netherlands
- Education: Leiden University
- Occupation: Art historian

Cornelia Wilhelmina "Willemijn" Fock (25 June 1942 – 3 June 2021) was a Dutch art historian. She was professor of the history of applied arts at Leiden University.

== Career ==
Fock obtained her doctorate at Leiden University in 1975 with a dissertation on the goldsmith Jacques Bylivelt at the court of Florence. In 1982, she became a professor of the history of applied arts at the same university. She was mainly concerned with the history of interior decoration and furniture, tapestries and goldsmithing. She wrote books about residential culture and Rapenburg in Leiden. Fock retired in 2007. In 2019, she was awarded an honorary membership of the Vereniging van Nederlandse Kunsthistorici (Association of Dutch Art Historians).

Fock died on 3 June 2021.

== Bibliography ==
- Cornelia Willemina Fock: Jaques Bylivelt aan het hof van Florence. Goudsmeden en steensnijders in dienst van de eerste groothertogen van Toscane. Alphen aan de Rijn, Visdruk, 1975. Geen ISBN.
- Willemijn Fock: Het Nederlandse interieur in beeld 1600-1900. Zwolle, Waanders, 2001. ISBN 90-400-9588-4
- Th.H. Lunsingh Scheurleer, C. Willemijn Fock, A.J. van Dissel: Het Rapenburg; geschiedenis van een Leidse gracht; Deel I; Groenhazenburch. Leiden, Rijksuniversiteit Leiden, 1986. ISBN 9064711798
- Th.H. Lunsingh Scheurleer, C. Willemijn Fock, A.J. van Dissel: Het Rapenburg; geschiedenis van een Leidse gracht; Deel II; De paplepel. Leiden, Rijksuniversiteit Leiden, 1987. ISBN 9064711968
- Th.H. Lunsingh Scheurleer, C. Willemijn Fock, A.J. van Dissel: Het Rapenburg; geschiedenis van een Leidse gracht; Deel III; Meyenburch. Leiden, Rijksuniversiteit Leiden, 1988. ISBN 906471214X
- Th.H. Lunsingh Scheurleer, C. Willemijn Fock, A.J. van Dissel: Het Rapenburg; geschiedenis van een Leidse gracht; Deel IV; Leeuwenhorst. Leiden, Rijksuniversiteit Leiden, 1989. ISBN 906471231X
- Th.H. Lunsingh Scheurleer, C. Willemijn Fock, A.J. van Dissel: Het Rapenburg; geschiedenis van een Leidse gracht; Deel V; 's; Gravensteyn. Leiden, Rijksuniversiteit Leiden, 1990. ISBN 9064712409
- Th.H. Lunsingh Scheurleer, C. Willemijn Fock, A.J. van Dissel: Het Rapenburg; geschiedenis van een Leidse gracht; Deel VI; Het; Rijck van Pallas. Leiden, Rijksuniversiteit Leiden, 1992. ISBN 9789064712609
- C. Willemijn Fock: Het Rapenburg; geschiedenis van een Leidse gracht; Index van personen betreft delen I-V. Leiden, Rijksuniversiteit Leiden, 1992. ISBN 906471262X
