= John II of Nassau =

John II of Nassau may refer to:

- John II of Nassau, Archbishop of Mainz (1360-1419), Archbishop of Mainz (1397-1419)
- John II, Count of Nassau-Beilstein (died 1513)
- John II of Nassau-Saarbrücken (1423-1472)
- John II, Count of Nassau-Siegen (died 1443)
