= John III of Nassau =

John III of Nassau may refer to:

- John III, Count of Nassau-Beilstein (1495-1561)
- John III, Count of Nassau-Saarbrücken (1511-1574)
- John III, Count of Nassau-Siegen (died 1430)
- John III, Count of Nassau-Weilburg (1441-1480)
