= William I of Nassau-Siegen =

German count (1487–1559)

William I, Count of Nassau-Siegen
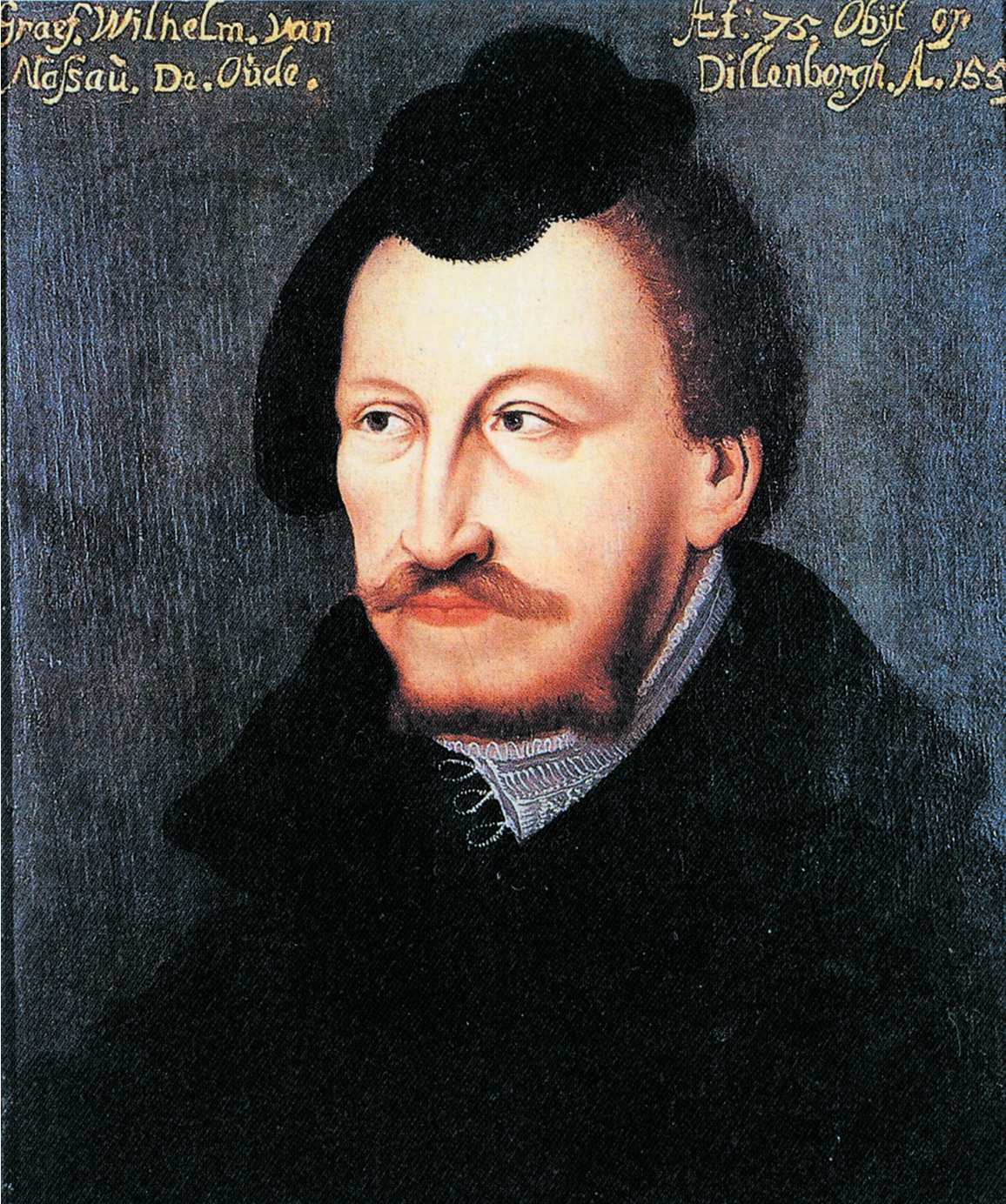
- Portrait by Dutch artist Johannes Tideman (1671)

Count of Nassau-Siegen Count of Diez
- Coat of arms
- Reign: 30 July 1516 – 6 October 1559
- Predecessor: John V
- Successor: John VI the Elder; Louis; Adolf; Henry
- Native name: Wilhelm I. Graf von Nassau-Siegen
- Born: 10 April 1487; Dillenburg
- Died: 6 October 1559 (aged 72); Dillenburg
- Buried: Fürstengruft, Evangelische Stadtkirche, Dillenburg
- Noble family: Nassau-Siegen
- Spouses: Walburga of Egmont (m. 1506; died 1529) Juliane of Stolberg-Wernigerode (m. 1531)
- Issue more...: Elisabeth of Nassau; Magdalene, Countess of Neuenahr and Moers; William I, Prince of Orange; John VI, Count of Nassau-Dillenburg; Louis of Nassau; Maria, Countess of Berg; Adolf of Nassau; Anna, Countess of Nassau-Weilburg; Elisabeth, Countess of Solms-Braunfels; Catherine, Countess of Schwarzburg-Arnstadt; Juliane, Countess of Schwarzburg-Rudolstadt; Magdalena, Countess of Hohenlohe-Weikersheim; Henry of Nassau
- Father: John V
- Mother: Elisabeth of Hesse-Marburg

William I of Nassau-Siegen (Note: In many sources he is called William I of Nassau(-Dillenburg) and in some sources of Nassau-Katzenelnbogen. He was born with the titles Count of Nassau, Vianden and Diez. Two years before his death, he obtained the right to hold the title Count of Katzenelnbogen, which meant that since then he held the official titles Count of Nassau, Katzenelnbogen, Vianden and Diez. It is incorrect to refer to him as the only reigning Count of Nassau, because the County of Nassau was divided into Nassau-Beilstein, Nassau-Siegen, Nassau-Weilburg and Nassau-Wiesbaden. Furthermore, there was the cadet branch of Nassau-Saarbrücken, which ruled the counties of Saarbrücken and Saarwerden. William ruled the County of Nassau-Siegen, which is erroneously called Nassau-Dillenburg in many sources. See note 2.) (German: Wilhelm I. Graf von Nassau-Siegen; 10 April 1487 – 6 October 1559), nicknamed the Elder (German: der Ältere) or the Rich (German: der Reiche), was Count of Nassau-Siegen (Note: The County of Nassau-Siegen is erroneously called Nassau-Dillenburg in many sources. The county was not named after the small, unimportant city of Dillenburg, which did not even have a church until 1491, but after the, for that time, large city of Siegen, the economic centre of the county and the counts' main residence. See Lück (1981), passim. Van Stipriaan (2021), p. 123 states that Siegen was the capital of the county. It is also evident from the numbering of the reigning counts with the given name John. One John without regal number who ruled the County of Nassau-Dillenburg in the period 1303–1328, and eight counts by the name of John who ruled the County of Nassau-Siegen in the period 1362–1638.) and half of Diez from 1516 to 1559. He was a descendant of the Ottonian Line of the House of Nassau.

William's reign marked a notable period in the history of his house. During his reign, he introduced the Reformation in his territories, and the saw expansion of his county's territorial possessions. He promoted the Lutheran faith and played a key role in the political events of his time, including involvement in the Schmalkaldic League and negotiations leading to the Peace of Passau. William advanced the interests of his house through a policy of moderation, and contributed to its success.

A major challenge throughout his reign was the succession dispute over the County of Katzenelnbogen, which was contested by the Landgraviate of Hesse. This dispute was known as the War of the Katzenelnbogen Succession.

William was described as calm and persistent. He maintained firm religious convictions, and was resolute in asserting his rights in the Katzenelnbogische Erbfolgestreit. Through his diplomatic skills, he earned numerous mediation assignments within the Holy Roman Empire.

In Dutch history, he is primarily remembered as the father of Prince William the Silent.

== Early years ==
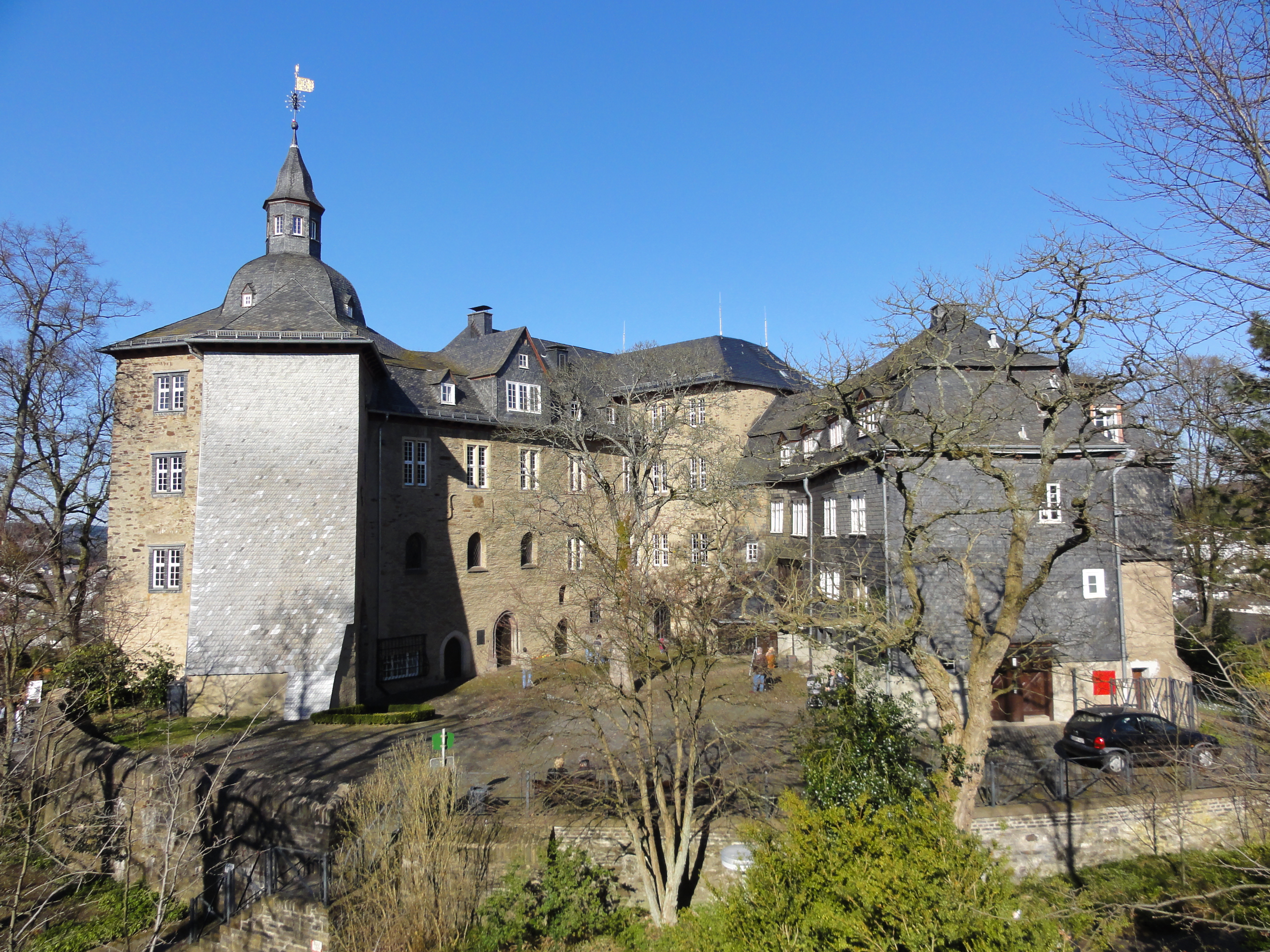
Siegen Castle, 2011.

William was born in Dillenburg on 10 April 1487 as the fourth and youngest son of Count John V of Nassau-Siegen and Landgravine Elisabeth of Hesse-Marburg. (Note: Van Ditzhuyzen (2004), p. 249, Dek (1970), p. 70 and Vorsterman van Oyen (1882), p. 95 incorrectly shorten the name of his mother to Elisabeth of Hesse.) At William's baptism, his mother's uncle, Archbishop Herman IV of Cologne, was present. William spent most of his youth in Siegen, where he trained himself in the use of weapons, and received a bow at the age of six and a pair of spurs two years later. He and his elder brother Henry often rode horses at the horse fairs and stallion farms of the County of Nassau. William frequently stayed with his parents in the County of Vianden, which was owned by the Nassaus, where he learnt both French and German.

At the age of ten, William he was sent zu hoff (to court) in Heidelberg, where he learned Latin and established lasting relations with the Electorate of the Palatinate. (Note: According to Van Ditzhuyzen (2004), p. 249, William learned Latin in Heidelberg in 1493/94, i.e. when he was only 6/7 years old.) In his early youth, he travelled extensively through the German lands, which included a visit to the court of Elector Frederick III the Wise in Saxony, where he formed importance relations for the future.

Since 1499, William's eldest brother Henry stayed at the court of their childless uncle Engelbert II of Nassau in Breda and Brussels, where he received further education. Upon Engelbert's death in 1504, Henry inherited his possessions in the Netherlands. (Note: Vorsterman van Oyen (1882), p. 95, 96, 98, states that John V inherited the possessions of his brother Engelbert II, as well as that John's sons divided those possessions after his death in 1516, Henry III acquiring the possessions in the Netherlands and William the possessions in Germany. The latter is also mentioned by Kolb (1898), p. 129.) In the same year, William's older brother John died, leaving William as the sole heir of their father.

During the War of the Succession of Landshut (1504–1505), William earned his first military laurels as captain of a Nassau cavalry squadron. At the Imperial Diet in Cologne in 1505, he met Emperor Maximilian I and accompanied Elector Frederick III of Saxony to Arnhem, where he met Walburga of Egmont. In 1506, the marriage was arranged at Siegen with a messenger from Count John III of Egmont, and shortly afterwards the marriage was consummated at Koblenz.

The wedding was attended by Archbishop Herman IV of Cologne, John II of Trier and other guests from the nobility. Henry, the groom's brother, had come over from the Netherlands. Shortly before, on 16 February 1506, the Beilager of William's sisters Elisabeth and Mary, who married the counts John III of Wied and Jobst I of Holstein-Schauenburg-Pinneberg respectively, was celebrated in Dillenburg with the greatest of festivities. The purchase of gold fabric for 747 guilders and silk fabric for 396 guilders at the trade fair in Mainz for these celebrations, as well as the unusually high total expenditure of 13,505 guilders in the accounts of 1505/1506, show that these weddings had been extravagant events. Soon after the wedding, William set up his own court at Dillenburg Castle. There, he laid the foundation stone for the tower facing the valley of Dillenburg on 23 March. In August 1506, he had body armours made for himself and five of his servants in Frankfurt.

== Count of Nassau-Siegen and Diez ==
When his father died in 1516, William inherited his properties, including the county. The county covered about 1,600 square kilometres, with about 37,500 inhabitants that lived in 15 cities and 550 villages. The regular income at that time is estimated at less than 50,000 guilders, derived from taxes, service fees, tolls, etc. The county was primarily agricultural. Pigs were raised on the Kalteiche, which benefited from the large oak forests. The county was known for its good horse and cattle breeding in Westerwald, and wool weaving in Herborn. However, the main source of income came from the mountains; from the iron ore of the Sieg and Dill regions. The Counts of Nassau regularly received the iron ore tithes from the mines and smelting rents from the smelters. The latter was levied in various ways, partly as compensation for the fief of the land on which the smelter stood, partly as a tax on the use of the watercourse, which was on loan from the territorial lord. As some of the most important citizens of the state, the hammer smiths of Siegen were granted exemption from feudal duties, and from about 1539, paid 24 raderguilders a year for this instead of the hitherto usual reisigen Pferdes. Until 1555, the count himself owned many iron smelters, and in the Dillenburg district he retained his influence even after 1555. Naturally, the counts cared about the welfare of the iron industry, which was the country's main source of income. They discussed with the iron workers price regulations, wages and working times as well as trying out new technical processes.

In 1520, the counts united in associations or Korrespondenzen, and divided into two large districts of the Netherlands and of the Wetterau. William was put in charge of the Wetterau district. The economic, political and spiritual consequences of this alliance were significant, although not fully understood. The leading position in these Grafenkorrespondenz was majorly held by members of the House of Nassau. Of particular importance were certain toll agreements by this Wetterauer Grafenverein, which almost foreshadowed a Western toll union. This toll union had already been established in the Wetterau by Emperor Frederick Barbarossa and had withstood political and territorial changes. Although in 1354 only half of the County of Nassau belonged to the Wetterau (the Siegerland had been allocated to the district of Westphalia), the entire county benefited from the toll agreements because the count was a member of the Wetterauer Grafenverein. Within this toll union, a simple declaration was enough to transport provisions, fruit, grain, oat, meat, wine, butter, cheese and iron freely. The designation of iron as the only non-agricultural product showed this toll union was important to Nassau, and especially to the iron trade from the Siegerland. The expansion of the toll area in 1515 led to the abolition of several Rhine tolls and opened the way for iron from the Siegerland to reach Antwerp and other markets where the people of the Siegerland, as subjects of Nassau, could take advantage of the more favourable market conditions. The expansion of the toll area brought benefits for production, as the import duties for charcoal from the County of Wittgenstein and the Freier Grund, (Note: "The Hickengrund or Freier Grund consisted of the regions Seelbach and Burbach (see Spielmann (1909), p. 119).") which partly belonged to the County of Sayn, were abolished.

The justice system continued in the forms adopted in the 16th century. Periodically, the Schützen (town watchers) were responsible for apprehending offenders, confining them either in the tower or, for less severe offences, in the Hundskrapf. The most common method of execution was hanging, with the gallows situated near Dillenburg on the Galgenberg. The executions were exclusively conducted in Dillenburg. In 1546, one occurred in Ebersbach, as was common in the past, with the participation of Schultheißen from Dillenburg. Conversely, Schultheißen from Herborn were often involved in the executions in Dillenburg, and were subsequently entertained by the city.

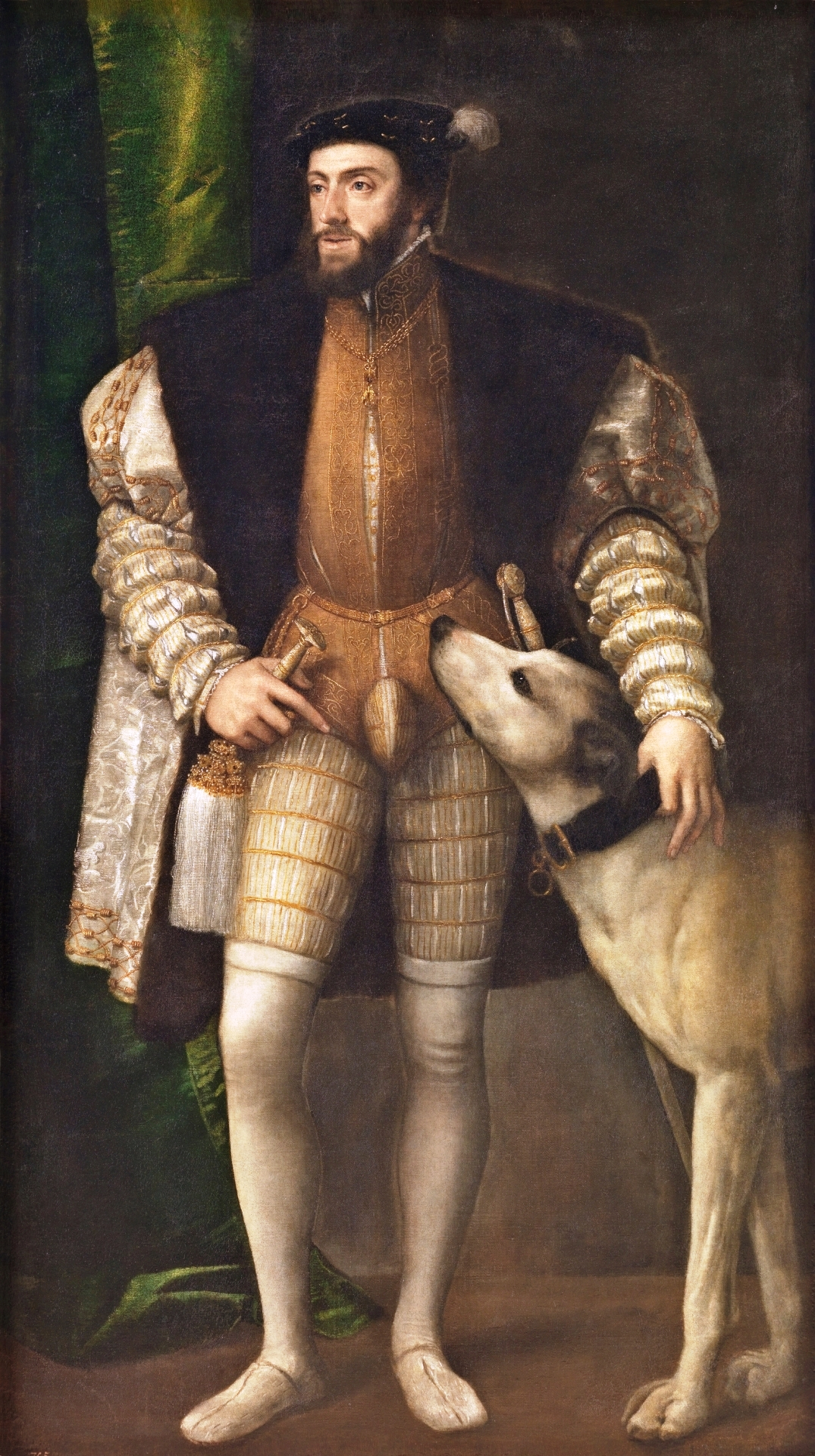
Emperor Charles V. Portrait by Titian, 1533. Museo Nacional del Prado, Madrid.

In 1518, William became Rat und Diener (counsellor and servant) of the Emperor. In this capacity, he attended Charles V's election as Roman King in Frankfurt. William quickly gained prestige and influence. In Charles V's war against King Francis I of France in 1521–1522, William served in the Imperial Army. In the summer of 1521, he participated with a cavalry squadron at the Siege of Mézières, led by his brother Henry. When William's baby daughter Magdalene was baptised in November 1522, guests at Siegen Castle included his friend Count Philip II of Hanau-Münzenberg and his young bride Countess Juliane of Stolberg-Wernigerode.

Because of his prudent administration, William was a beloved ruler among his subjects. This was evident during the German Peasants' War of 1524–1525 in which violent excesses occurred in numerous places in Germany, but from which Nassau was largely spared. On 18 May 1525, William wrote to his brother Henry in the Netherlands, stating that the whole of southern Germany was ablaze with peasant revolt and that he was very worried about it: "Meine Bauern sind gottlob noch ruhig und zufrieden, aber das Wetter ist allenthalben um mich her." ("My peasants are thankfully still calm and content, but the bad weather is all around me."). William helped his threatened fellow princes against the peasants by sending some of them a Nassau auxiliary corps "wider den uffruhr" ("against the revolt"). Nevertheless, he enjoyed a certain respect among the peasants as a just territorial lord. The Hessian Amtmann Balthasar Schrautenbach wrote that the Franconian peasants wanted to expel Landgrave Philip I the Magnanimous of Hesse and put William in his place. The peasant writer Sigle is said to have given courage to his people by saying that as soon as the landgrave turned against them, der reiche Nassau would come into the country. Thus even then, William was nicknamed the Rich.

William was a cautious large landowner. Whereas his father took great interest in strengthening his position as territorial lord by acquiring the largest possible amount of his own property in farmsteads, meadows and arable land, William strove to expand and complete his land holdings especially around Dillenburg. Through purchase and barter, he not only significantly expanded the large Herrenwiese with adjacent other plots of land, but around 1526, he also acquired the land in Lorbach, which was in private hands of several inhabitants of Dillenburg and Feldbach, in order to build the "zwey Wagen Spur breiten Weg" ("two wagon tracks wide road") there.

In 1526, Prince John Frederick of Saxony and his father, Elector John the Steadfast of Saxony, visited William in Siegen. He was asked to convey for the prince his marriage proposal to Princess Sibylle of Cleves. Sibylle's father, Duke John III of Cleves, was William's first cousin.

In 1528, William was concerned about his local industry. He regulated the working hours of iron smelters and banned hammer smiths from working at night. He also ordered iron to be marked before it was sold, creating one of the earliest hallmarks for steel. On 9 October 1528, the Emperor approved his appointment as governor of Luxembourg, but William refused to accept the office.

In 1529, William's wife Walburga died and was buried in Siegen. His brother Henry suggested he looked for a new life companion in the highest princely houses and suggested a princess of Lorraine, who brought in a rich marital estate. In the same year, William's friend Philip II of Hanau-Münzenberg died. Philip left behind underage children, over whom Willam took custody. There were regular exchanges between William, the widower in Siegen, and Juliane, the widow in Hanau. Matters of faith were also discussed, as Hanau had embraced Martin Luther's teachings early on.

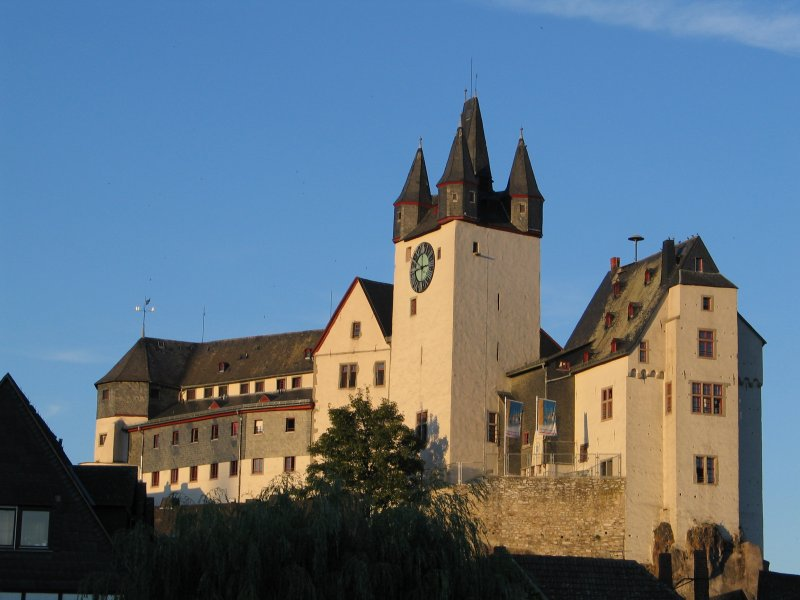
Diez Castle. Photo: Peter Klassen, 2006.

On 20 September 1531, the marriage of William and Juliane took place in the hall (Note: The Festsaal (Festive Hall) today is named Oraniersaal (Orange Hall) and is part of the Siegerland Museum in Siegen Castle.) of Siegen Castle. The marriage was conducted according to the Catholic ritual. The baptism of their eldest son, William, on 4 May 1533 also took place according to Catholic tradition; a full mass with Latin formulas, with the use of salt, which symbolised the doctrine of faith, and with a real exorcism of the devil. Through this marriage, William acquired a quarter of the County of Diez (of which he already owned half) in 1535, which had previously been in possession of the Eppstein family. Lord Eberhard IV of Eppstein-Königstein, brother of William's mother-in-law, died childless in 1535. The Eppstein family had gained control of this territory in 1420 through the marriage of Lord Godfrey VII of Eppstein-Münzenberg to Countess Jutta of Nassau-Siegen. (Note: Countess Jutta of Nassau-Siegen was the only child of Count Adolf I of Nassau-Siegen and Countess Jutta of Diez, by which marriage the County of Diez had come into Adolf's possession. After Adolf's death in 1420, the County of Diez was divided, one half came to his daughter Jutta, the other half to his brothers.)

During the era marked by religious and political upheavals, including Luther's first published translation of the Bible, the founding of the Society of Jesus by Ignatius of Loyola, and the execution of Thomas More in England, William was involved in numerous mediation assignments. Despite being offered esteemed positions such as commander in the Imperial Army and Imperial Statthalter in the Duchy of Württemberg in 1532, as well as the Order of the Golden Fleece in 1533, William declined these honours to maintain his impartiality. (Note: Kolb (1898), p. 130 states the years 1531 and 1536 respectively.) He rejected the Order of the Golden Fleece, which Charles V wanted to grant him, due to its requirement for members to adhere the Catholic faith.

On 10 January 1531, the Schmalkaldic League was founded by the Protestant Elector John of Saxony, Duke Ernest I of Brunswick-Lüneburg, Landgrave Philip I of Hesse, Fürst Wolfgang of Anhalt-Köthen, the counts of Mansfeld and several minor Imperial Estates. The threat to Vienna and the imperial homelands by the Turks initially prevented Charles V from acting against the league, and the league forced him to conclude the Nuremberg Religion Peace in 1532. After Duke Ulrich of Württemberg, supported by Philip of Hesse, recaptured his lands in 1534, most members of the Wetterauer Grafenverein joined the league, including William. On 10 January 1536, (Note: Van Ditzhuyzen (2004), p. 250, Dek (1970), p. 72 and Vorsterman van Oyen (1882), p. 98 state that William joined the Schmalkaldic League in 1535.) he committed to contribute to, and cooperate with everything the league would decide. Because of the Katzenelnbogische Erbfolgestreit, Philip of Hesse protested against William's admission into the league.

William issued several decrees for the economical, social and ethical benefit and advancement of his subjects. Despite his country being beset by threats of war throughout his reign, he instructed his officials by various mandates to ensure that the land peace renewed by the Emperor on various Imperial Diets was maintained in his county and that all troublemakers, vagrants and beggars were taken into the strictest custody. The wool purchasing ordinance promulgated by William on 19 May 1536 served to revive domestic wool weaving by strictly prohibiting the sale of sheep wool to foreign buyers and regulating in detail the country's trade by weight and price. The ordinance promulgated on 10 December 1538 for artisans, wagoners and day labourers regulated in detail wages and working hours in summer and winter; working hours were set from 4am to 7pm in the summer, and from 5am to 6pm in winter. In the spring, the wagoners were only allowed to use their horses and wagons for arable farming. William was also already thinking about a more generous meat supply for his country. Pig breeding lagged especially in times of poor acorn harvest. In such years, he bought fat pigs from abroad. In 1538, for example, he sent the Rentmeister and an attendant to Lippe to buy pigs.

Due to the Katzenelnbogische Erbfolgestreit, the county became increasingly entangled in debt. The shortage of timber and charcoal led to an economic downturn that crippled the iron industry. William issued decrees that demonstrated his thorough knowledge of the industrial situation. In October 1538, he became a shareholder in the Gewerkschaft of the famous Stahlberg Mine at Müsen near Hilchenbach in Siegerland. He bought the share from Kilian Theis of Ernsdorf for 25 Raderguilders. 11 years later, when two other shareholders filed suit against William, he did not rule as sovereign, but let the ordinary mountain court judge. When the court ruled in his favour, the plaintiffs appealed. In the new proceedings, which William again did not interfere with, a judgement was passed against him.

Despite the debts, many baptisms and weddings were celebrated extensively. The most splendid of these baptisms, the ecclesiastical and secular course of which has been preserved for almost all of William's children, was that of his third son Louis, born on 10 January 1538, who was baptised by Count palatine Louis V in the presence of Archbishop Herman V of Cologne. The number of guests at this feast was so large that Dillenburg Castle could not accommodate them all.

Times forced William to carefully build up an armament industry. As early as around 1540, he had research conducted in Siegen into whether the iron from Wissenbach could be hammered into sheet iron for body armours and the like. He planned the construction of new Plattenhämmer (sheet metal factories), for which he employed sheet metal smiths from the Olpe district on 25 March 1540. The fire outbreak at the small border fortress and the village of Freudenberg in July 1540 boosted these plans. William had the houses hastily rebuilt, while the damaged castle was repaired more slowly.

His diplomatic strength of persuasion earned William another mediating role in 1540 in the succession dispute in the Duchy of Guelders between Emperor Charles V as Duke of Burgundy and Duke Antoine of Lorraine. As Antoine completely disregarded William's advice, he then permanently lost the Duchy of Guelders and the County of Zutphen. For the aid granted at the Imperial Diet of Speyer in 1542 against the Turks, William had provided a military contingent. That contingent under Junker Johann von Selbach-Crottorf arrived in Raab, Hungary in 1542, but did not get involved in the fighting. For the same purpose William paid a larger sum in 1544.

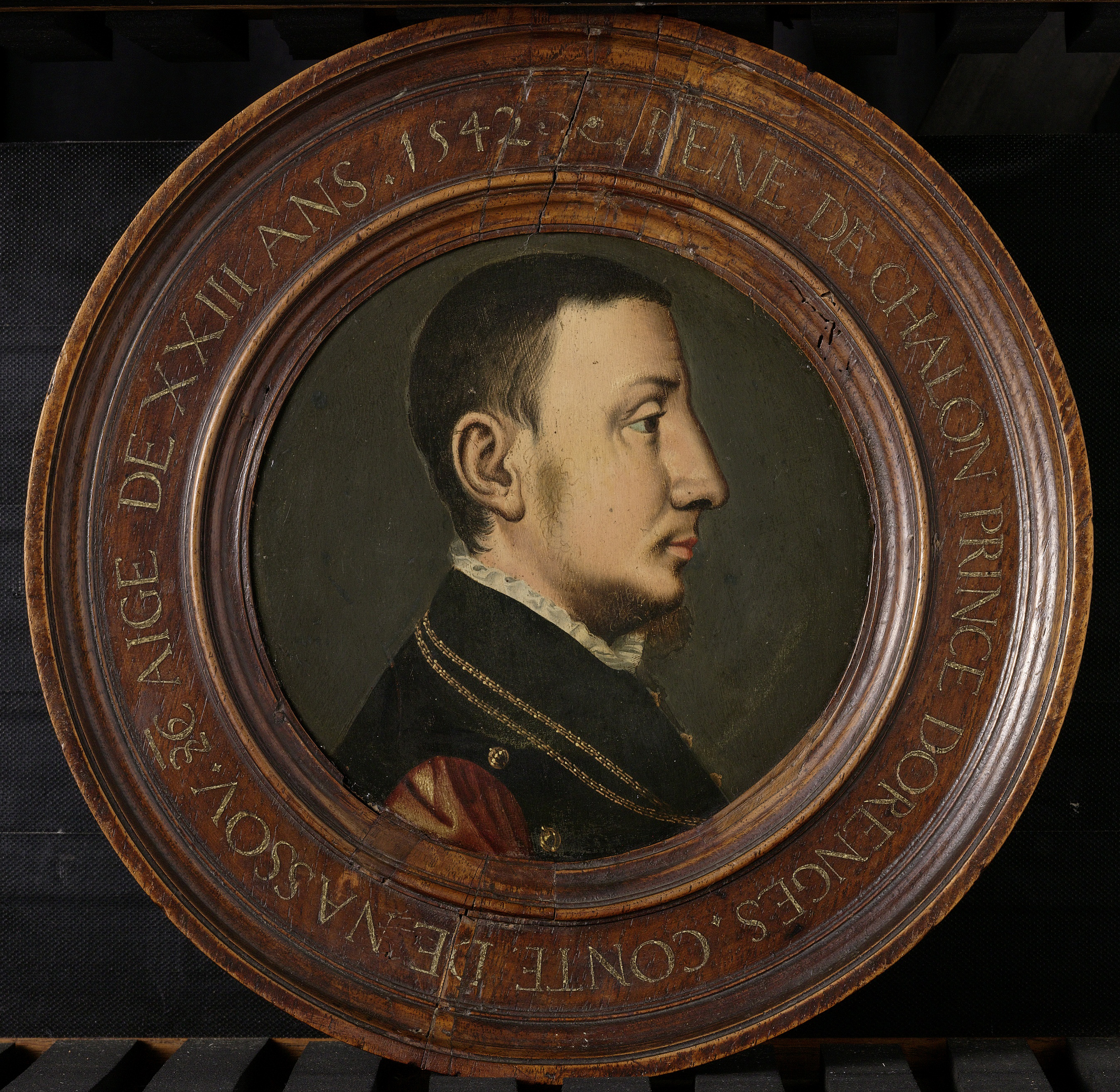
René de Chalon, Prince of Orange, William's nephew. Portrait by Jan van Scorel. Rijksmuseum, Amsterdam.

During the Siege of Saint-Dizier in Champagne in July 1544, René of Chalon, the only son of William's eldest brother Henry, was hit in the right shoulder by a musket bullet. He died the next day in the arms of Charles V. In the holographic will drawn up by René, he had stipulated that the eldest son of his uncle William became universal heir to all his properties, unusually bypassing his uncle, because of his Lutheran sympathies. The counsellors of Charles V did object to this succession on the grounds that William had Protestant tendencies. But the Emperor decided to honour René's will, albeit on condition that the young heir would be removed from his parental authority and brought up as a Catholic in the Netherlands. William did not hesitate to accept this arrangement, since, like his son in his later career, he was more inclined to consider his dynastic interests than his religious beliefs. (Note: Lück (1981), p. 49, on the other hand, writes: "Since only a young daughter had resulted from a marriage concluded four years earlier, and an illegitimate son, Palamedes, was not entitled to inherit, according to the Nassau House Treaty of 1472, his extensive inheritance was to fall to his closest male relative, namely his uncle William. But the Emperor's councillors did not want that such an extensive inheritance would fall into the hands of a Ketzer. However, since they could not cancel existing agreements, they found a way out by naming the Count of Nassau's son, William, born in 1533 and only 11 years old, as heir, on the express condition that he would be raised at the Imperial Court and in a Catholic environment. For the sake of the greatness and future of their House, the parents made the sacrifice of having their 11-year-old son William moved to the Imperial Court".) On 13 February 1545, Charles V formalised the arrangements.

William did not take part in the war of the Schmalkaldic League against Duke Henry V of Brunswick-Wolfenbüttel. The growing power of his opponent Philip of Hesse in the league forced William to be wary of violence and was one of the reasons why he did not take part in the Schmalkaldic War against the Emperor, which broke out in 1546. William executed the recruitment of 600 horsemen for the Imperial Army entrusted to him. He thus escaped the punishment inflicted on his cousins from the Walramian Line and the other members of the Wetterauer Grafenverein. And although he had by now clearly placed himself on the Protestant side, he still had much influence with the Catholic, that many tried to win favour with Charles V through him. William attended the Imperial Diet in Augsburg in 1548.

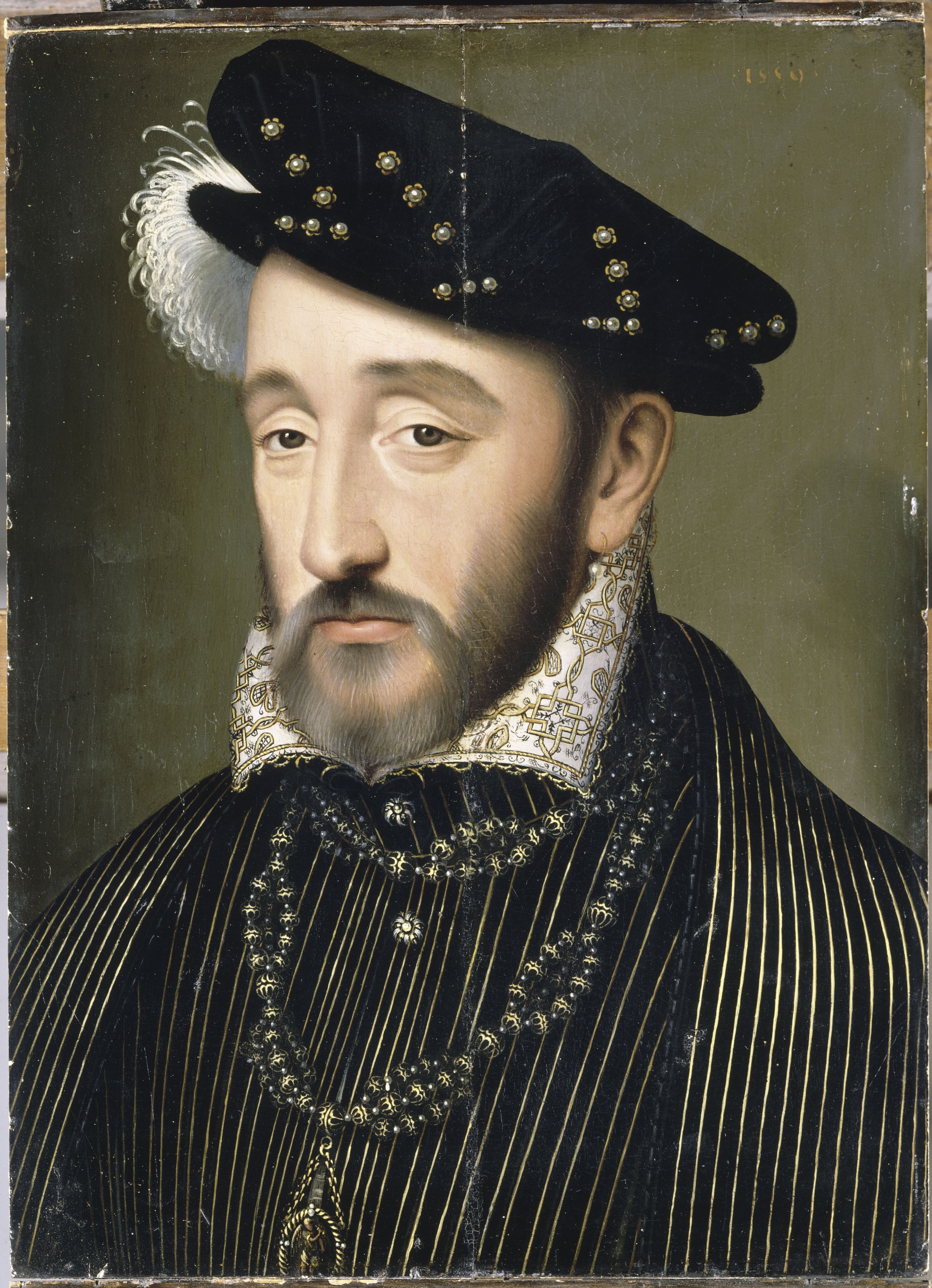
King Henry II of France. Portrait after François Clouet, 17th century. Palace of Versailles.

William was concerned about the developing relationship between the German princes and King Henry II of France. Henry II invited William to Butzbach in March 1551 to take sides, but William remained steadfast and neutral. As the senior of the House of Nassau, he had to consider both the German possessions and the threatened areas of his son the Prince of Orange located in France, the Principality of Orange itself and in the Franche-Comté. If in a coming dispute the German princes were to prevail with the King of France, Philip of Hesse would seize the County of Katzenelnbogen and Henry II would seize the Principality of Orange and its possessions in the Dauphiné and the Provence, totalling more than 800 cities, villages, castles and farmhouses, which yielded around 57,000 livres a year in annuities. This did not include the Principality of Orange itself. On 3 October 1551, the German princes united in Lochau against the Emperor. They demanded and got a declaration of neutrality from the Wetterauer Grafenverein. The only member not to sign this declaration was William. He stayed in the mighty fortress of Dillenburg with others troops from Breda, preparing for a Hessian-Saxon attack. Also in Siegen, the city walls were checked and the towers re-equipped. The guilds had to enrol and train the able-bodied men. Nassau was in a high state of alert. Messengers went from Dillenburg and Siegen to Breda with secret messages and coded letters. At the time, it was significant that Magister Wilhelm Knüttel acted simultaneously as secretary to Count William of Nassau and to his eldest son Prince William of Orange; all the threads of Nassau politics were in one hand. Some historians (Note: See, for example, Becker (1983), p. 61 and Kolb (1898), p. 130.) claim that William, because of his knowledge of the French language, was the spokesman for the German princes at Fontainebleau, who, in exchange for his help against the Emperor, assured the French king of sovereign rights as imperial vicar over the bishoprics of Metz, Toul, Verdun and Cambrai, thus relinquishing these cities to France. This claim is based solely on the dubious memoirs of the French marshal de Vieilville, Sire de Scépaux. These were not written until after 1584 and not printed in Paris until 1756–1763, long after the death of Prince William of Orange, to whom and whose house they wished to do harm.

The renewed shepherding ordinance for Dillenburg promulgated by William on 1 February 1552 was, like his father's ordinance, intended to protect the fields and forests during communal grazing and limited the maximum number of sheep for anyone who wished to keep sheep in the valley of Dillenburg to 25, instead of the earlier 50. On 12 September 1555, William sold the iron trade of the count's iron smelters to the citizens of the city and the subjects of the district of Siegen, with the exception of the iron smelter at Freudenberg, where he reserved for himself an annual iron smelting period of 12 weeks. This was the beginning of a monopoly on the iron trade, almost independent of the territorial lord. The citizens never used the freedoms granted to them to the detriment of the count, nor did the count use his rights to the detriment of his subjects.

William issued a large number of decrees aimed at the moral uplift of his subjects who, despite all previous measures, continued to return to their old vices. Since excessive spending on family celebrations provided particular opportunity for this, William tried to put an end to intemperance at child baptisms, weddings, funerals and guild meetings through strict regulations. To prevent revels and Sunday desecration, residents were obliged to close pubs at a surprisingly early hour, eight o'clock in summer and seven o'clock in winter. The count's ordinance of 19 December 1555 stipulated "daß über die bestimmte Zeit, wenn abends die Weinglock geläutet ist, kein Wirt länger weder über die Schwell hinaus oder auch sunsten seinen Gästen im Hause Wein reichen oder zapfen soll" ("that after the stipulated time, when in the evening the wine bell is rung, no innkeeper shall serve or tap wine to his guests in the house, nor over the threshold, nor otherwise"), because otherwise "viel Unrats, Mord, Totschlag, Unzucht und alle Untugend gemehret und überhand nimmt, wie neulich ein schrecklich Exempel und Totschlag sich derhalber zugetragen" ("much mischief, murder, manslaughter, fornication and all immorality will increase and prevail, as recently a terrible example and manslaughter took place thereby"). A particularly strict order issued by William on 7 July 1556 was against dancing. Dancing was generally forbidden in the county on Sundays and holidays. For weddings, permission was given by the mayors and bailiffs, and the dance took place in the presence of elders, a councillor, the town clerk or the court clerk at the town hall. Dancing was allowed only with violins and lutes, not on the street with drums, shawms and bagpipes, no longer than two hours in the afternoon and one hour after supper, and all disorderly and immoral jumping, twisting, overturning, arguing and shouting was to be avoided. One ordinance of William that characterised him as a profound and far-sighted sovereign was his ban on marriages between relatives: "Dieweil es etzo unter unseren Untertanen gemein wird, dass die Eltern ihr Kind in Verwandt-, Blutfreundschaft und Schwagerschaft im vierten Glied vermählen, daß doch im Rechte verboten" ("Because it is now customary among our subjects for parents to marry off their child in kinship, blood relationship and consanguinity in the fourth degree, which is forbidden by law"), the friends of both parties, when agreeing on a marriage, "sich erstlich der Sippschaft halben gründlich erkundigen, ob und wie nahe die Personen einander verwandt, und so die Verwandtnis zwischen ihnen im dritten oder vierten Glied bestände, alsdann soll dieselbig Ehe ohn unser Wissen und Willen nicht beteidingt, geschlossen noch zugelassen werden" ("first of all thoroughly inquire into the kinship, whether and how closely the persons are related to each other, and if the kinship between them is in the third or fourth degree, this marriage shall not be concluded or allowed without our knowledge and will").

=== Introduction of the Reformation ===
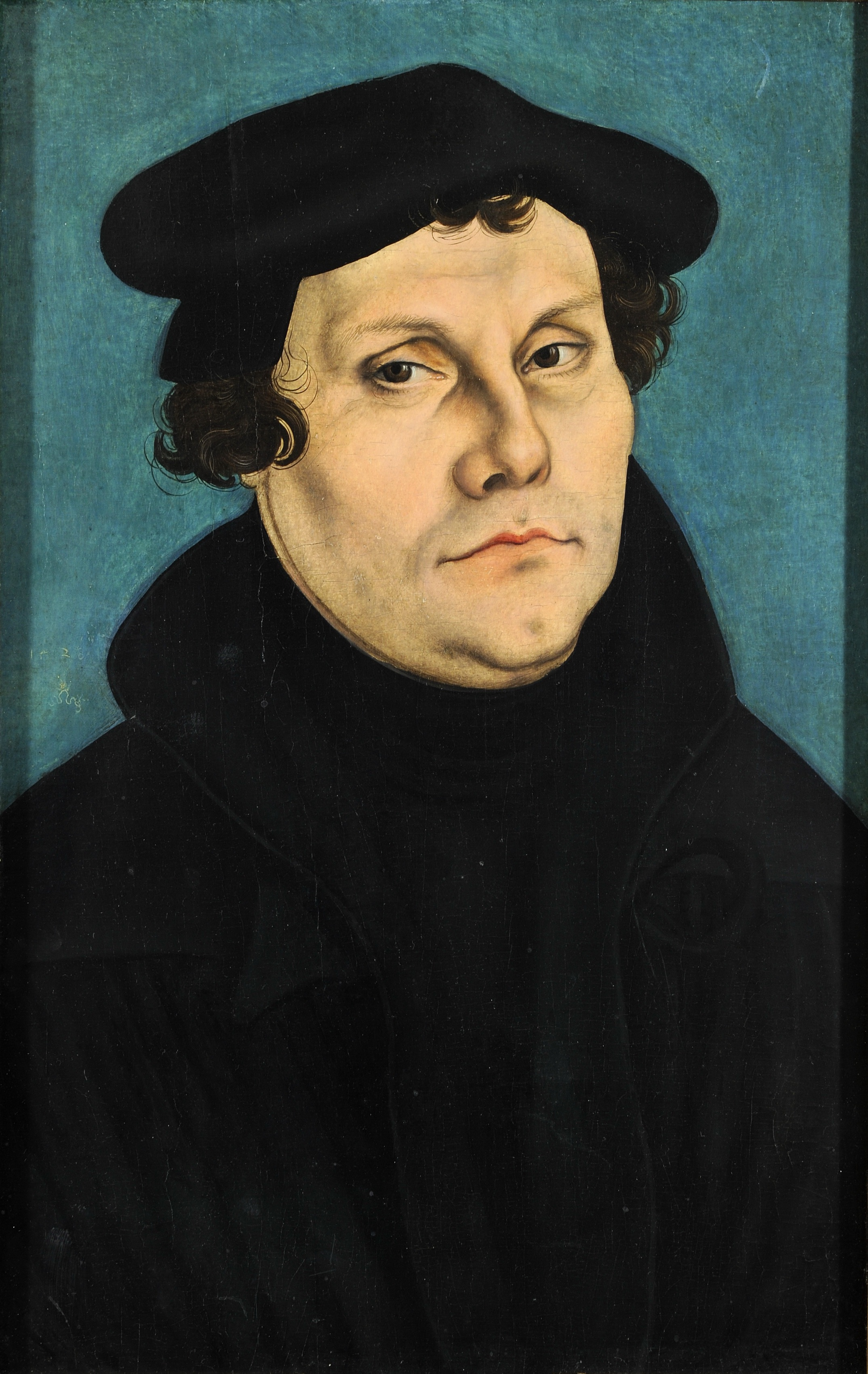
Martin Luther. Portrait by Lucas Cranach the Elder, 1528. Veste Coburg.

Shortly after the beginning of William's reign, the Augustinian monk Martin Luther initiated the movement of minds, from which the Protestant Church emerged with his Ninety-five Theses in 1517. Elector Frederick III the Wise of Saxony, Luther's patron, and Landgrave Philip I the Magnanimous of Hesse introduced the new doctrine to their realms. The Reformation took hold in Nassau much later. William, through his repeated stays at the court of the Elector of Saxony and his friendship with the young prince and later Elector John Frederick I, had made an early acquaintance with the professor from Wittenberg. In 1518, under the influence of Luther's theses, William tried to control the sale of indulgences in his country by having Archbishop Albert of Mainz order his subcommissioner Johann Breydenbach to stop the sale of indulgences, which had begun in Nassau, especially in the Siegerland. (Note: Lück (1981), p. 41 states that William banned the sale of indulgences in his territory in 1518. Kolb (1898), p. 129 states that William opposed the sale of indulgences as early as 1517.)

At the Imperial Diet of Worms in 1521, William was an eyewitness to Luther's appearance before Emperor Charles V and the Empire. It is not known whether he spoke to the reformer, but he was intensely engaged with Luther's ideas. However, he did not yet show any overt adherence to Luther's teachings, due to the great influence exerted on him by his brother Henry, a staunch supporter of the Emperor and the Catholic Church.

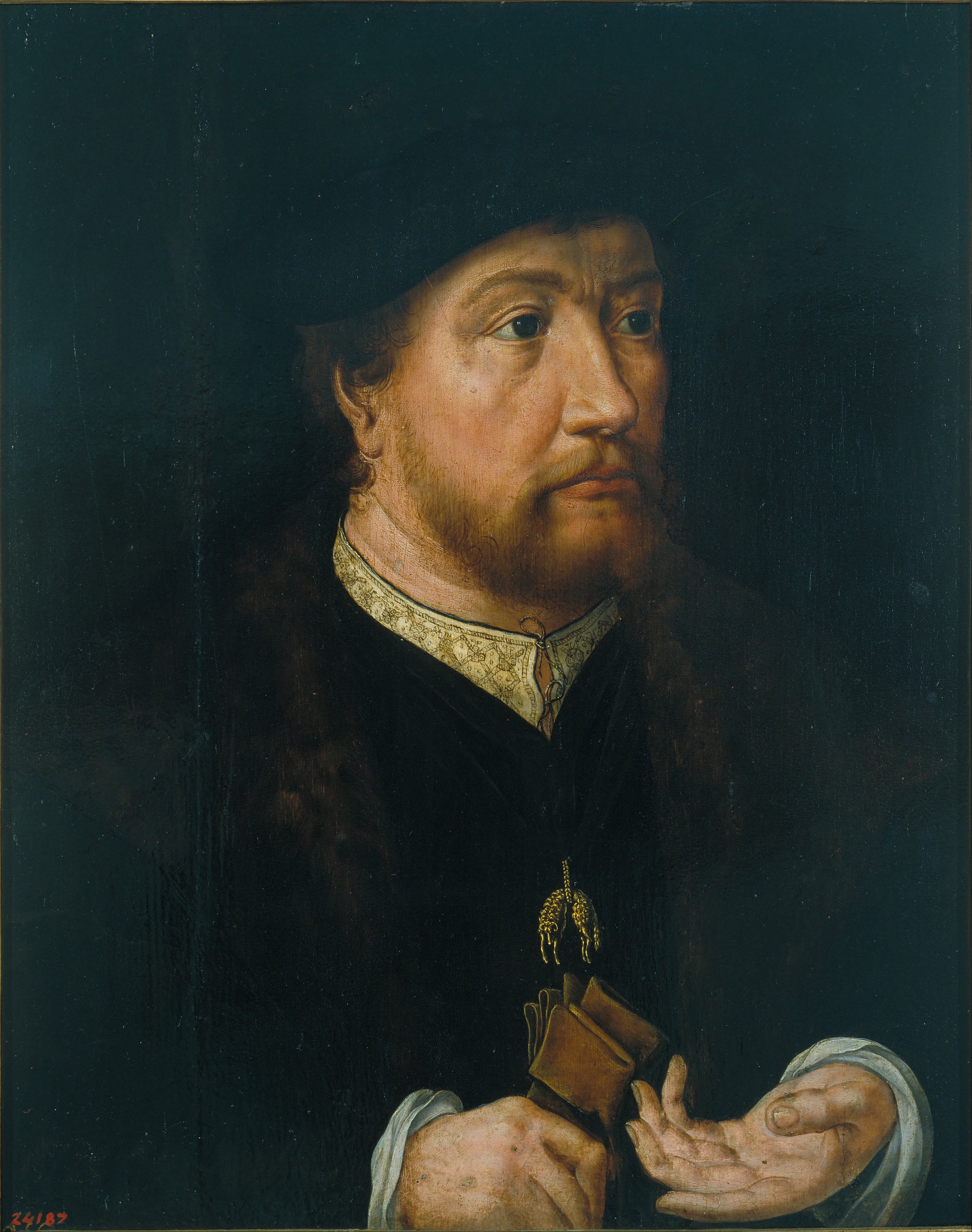
Count Henry III of Nassau-Breda, William's eldest brother. Portrait by Jan Gossaert, 1530–1532. Museu Nacional d'Art de Catalunya, Barcelona.

Shortly after his visit to William in 1526, John Frederick I of Saxony, in a letter dated 16 May from Torgau, sent William some of Luther's writings, to make of him, as he wrote, "mit göttlicher Hilfe einen guten Christen" ("with divine help a good Christian"). Only then did he give the new doctrine more space; tightened regulations on church discipline and the prohibition of individual practices of the Catholic Church marked the beginning of a kind of reformation, which left all essential points untouched for the time being. Henry considered it his duty to repeatedly remind his brother of the dangers he was exposing himself and his house to by abandoning the old faith. These warnings, in view of the already three-decade-long Katzenelnbogische Erbfolgestreit, in which the Emperor was Nassau's most powerful and almost sole supporter, had an effect on William, but neither were they able to dissuade him from his increasingly strong inclination towards Luther's doctrine. William had a calm, balanced personality, but also a persistent character. He convinced himself of the truth of the new faith, and embraced it wholeheartedly.

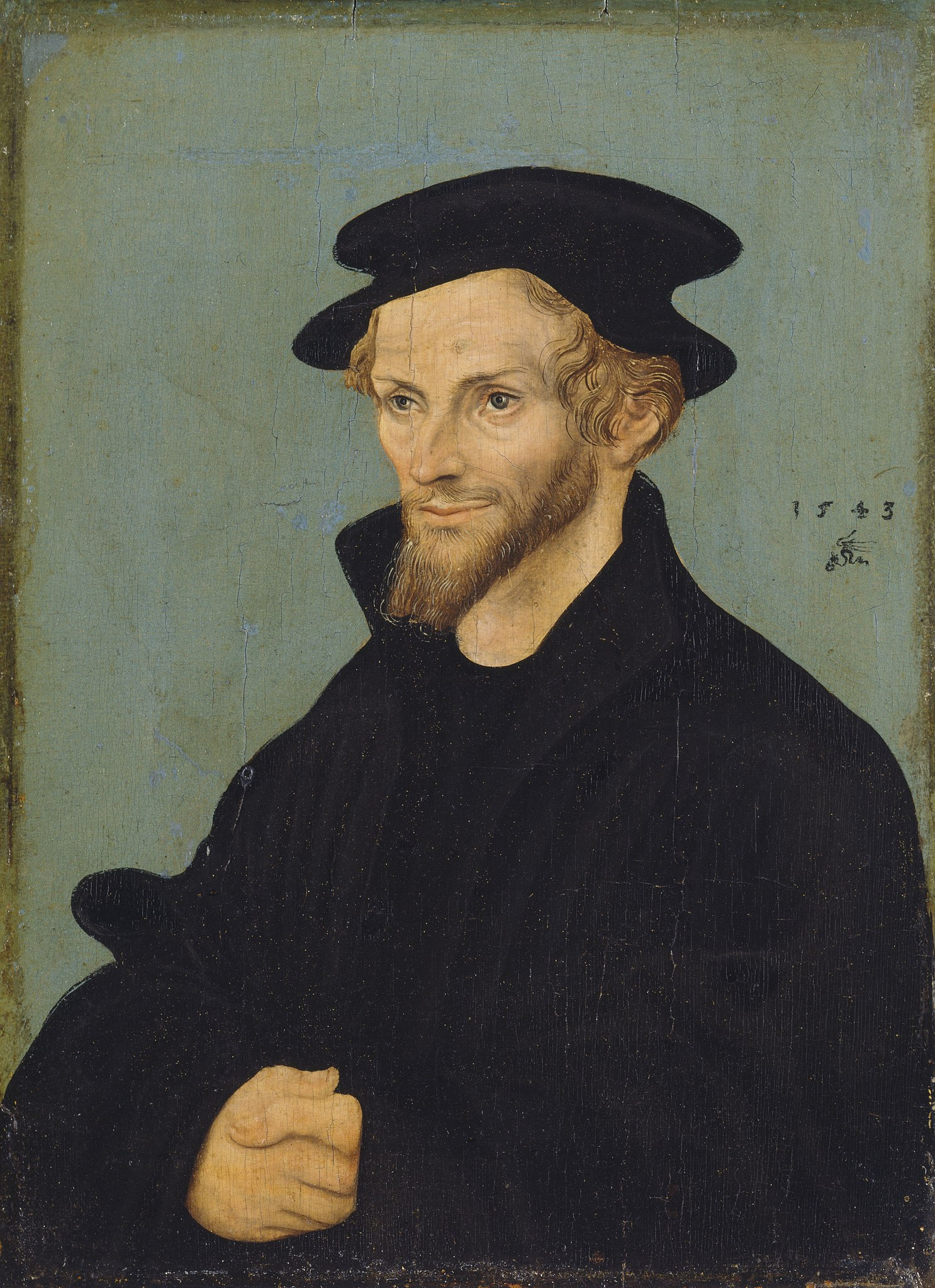
Philipp Melanchthon. Portrait by Lucas Cranach the Elder, 1543. Museumslandschaft Hessen Kassel.

In 1530, William attended the Imperial Diet of Augsburg, where the Protestant princes presented the Emperor their Bekenntnis (the Confessio Augustana). Also present in the Emperor's entourage was William's brother Henry. The Henry's secretary Alexander Schweis received the protest note for the Emperor. Immediately after William's return, were "die religion und kirchengebräuch zue Dillenbergk ... geendert und die meß abgestellt" ("the religion and church customs in Dillenburg ... changed and the mass ended"). He formally introduced the Augsburg Confession and abolished celibacy and mass. William worked cautiously and gradually, forced to do so not only by the necessary consideration with the Emperor and his brother Henry, but also by the ecclesiastical relations in his own county.

At that time the Siegerland had about 20,000 inhabitants and the number of parishes did not exceed 30. The relatively low level of education among the masses and clergy made rapid progress impossible. William initiated religious renewal in the county's two main cities, Dillenburg and Siegen, by replacing, in October 1530, the two previous parish priests, who had voluntarily retired in exchange for a mercy salary, with two representatives of the new doctrine. These were Heilman Bruchhausen from Krombach (usually called Heilman Krombach) and Leonhard Wagner from Kreuznach. Heilman Krombach, who had already been in William's service as court chaplain since March 1529, became the first minister of the city of Dillenburg. For himself and his family however, William believed it was more beneficial to keep the old faith outwardly. All his sons were still baptised according to Catholic tradition, and he obtained a papal dispensation from Lent in late 1531. William patiently allowed almost all the county's clergy to remain in their posts, although, due the incompetence and reprehensible lifestyles of a few, and due to some others having contrary attitude to Lutheran doctrine, they were of little help to the movement. During this time of transition, the lack of suitable clergy in his county became especially noticeable, and William was forced to look for the necessary replacements elsewhere. He received help from the old relations he had established with Saxony. It was mainly through the mediation of Philipp Melanchthon, who maintained a lively correspondence with William's counsellor Wilhelm Knüttel, that a pupil of the two great reformers from Wittenberg, Erasmus Sarcerius from Annaberg in Saxony, came to the county as a helper. Sarcerius became not only the actual completionist of the Reformation, but also the new creator of the county's school system. With the church orders of 1532 (after the example in Brandenburg-Ansbach) and 1536 (after the church order of Nuremberg), and the church agenda of 1537, Lutheranism was organised in Nassau-Siegen. In 1536, William appointed Sarcerius as rector of the Latin school in Siegen. He was also appointed as court preacher and superintendent in 1537, (Note: Kolb (1898), p. 130 states the year 1538.) and as spiritual inspector of the entire county in 1541. During regular synods and church visits, Sarcerius reorganised the church system of the county on a Protestant basis.

In 1543, Melanchton stayed in Siegen. Archbishop Herman V of Cologne, whose brother John III of Wied had married William's sister Elisabeth, sought William's advice. The archbishop tried in vain to bring the Archbishopric of Cologne to the Reformation. With the Wied Family, the archbishop spent several weeks in Siegen.

In 1548, William had to let Sarcerius go because the Augsburg Interim no longer allowed him to do his work in the spirit of Luther. With the Interim (an imperial decree), the Emperor ruled that the Catholic doctrine was to be upheld until a general council was held and that the Lutheran Imperial Estates were to restore their former religious status within six months. William had to introduce the Interim in his county, which was again subordinated to the Archbishopric of Trier. The Interim evoked strong reluctance in the county, as it did elsewhere. Many parishes were now without pastors; but since the Catholic Church was unable to fill all vacant parishes with its priests, the former Protestant clergy mostly returned to their old posts. This remained so, especially after the Peace of Passau in 1552 abolished the Interim, and the Peace of Augsburg in 1555 granted the Protestant German Imperial Estates freedom of religion and the right to determine the religion of their subjects in their territory (Latin: cuius regio, eius religio).

=== The Katzenelnbogische Erbfolgestreit ===
A major challenge during William's reign was the dispute over the succession in the rich County of Katzenelnbogen, known as the Katzenelnbogische Erbfolgestreit. This succession dispute between Nassau and the Landgraviate of Hesse lasted for decades, and exerted considerable impact on William's country. Substantial resources were expended on numerous legal proceedings, and the rebuilding of Dillenburg Castle into a strong fortress, where soldiers were stationed for years to repel opposition attacks. The County of Katzenelnbogen was situated between the Taunus and the River Lahn and was very rich due to the possession of a large number of Rhine tolls between Mainz and the border of the Netherlands. The county consisted of Rheinfels, Sankt Goar, Braubach, Hohenstein, Darmstadt, Zwingenberg, Rüsselsheim and Umstadt, as well as Eppstein, the district of Driedorf and parts of Diez, Hadamar, Ems, Löhnberg, Camberg, Altweilnau and Wehrheim. The last seven possessions were jointly owned with the Counts of Nassau.

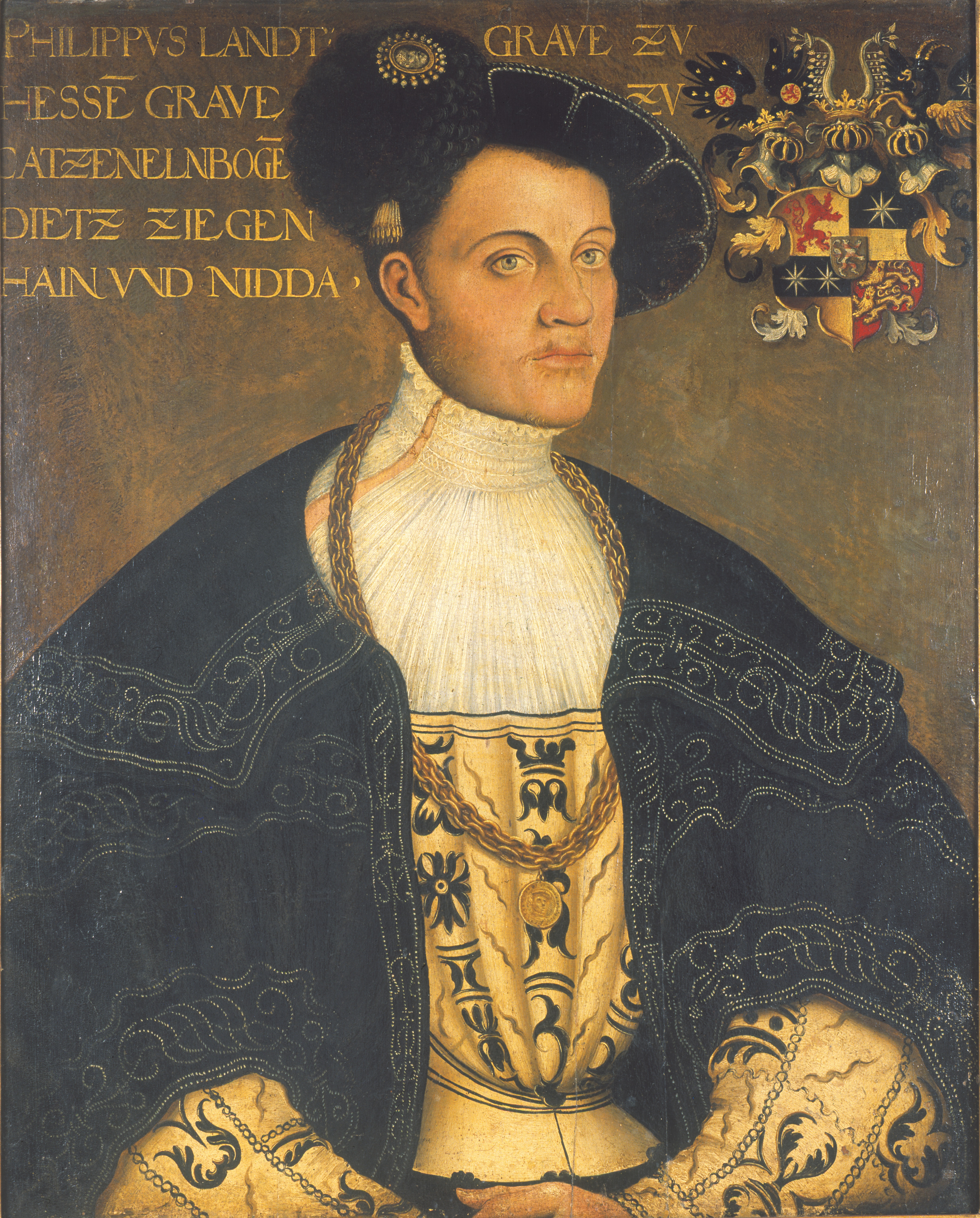
Landgrave Philip I of Hesse, William's opponent. Portrait by Hans Krell, 1534. Wartburg-Stiftung, Eisenach.

After the death of John V in 1516, his sons Henry and William continued the case with increased vigour. Henry's high position and close personal relationship with Charles V as an educator, general and advisor gave the Nassaus a major support in this protracted legal battle. Their legal opponent, the young Landgrave Philip I the Magnanimous of Hesse had an advantage because Hesse had gained control of the entire disputed territory, which gave him a strong position over the small County of Nassau; in addition, powerful imperial princes, such as Elector Frederick III the Wise of Saxony, were on his side as allies.

In 1520, Charles V referred the dispute from the Reichskammergericht to the Reichshofrat. This seemed favourable for William, because Alexander Schweis from Herborn, who was Henry's secretary, served as a judge in the latter court. Due to Henry's great influence on Charles V, the case was discussed at the Imperial Diet of Worms in 1521, but no final decision was made. A commission consisting of the Prince bishops Christoph of Augsburg, George of Bamberg and William III of Strasbourg was given the task of re-examining the case, which had been handled by the most important legal scholars of the time. The verdict, to which both parties had unconditionally submitted in advance, was handed down in Tübingen on 9 May 1523. It was favourable to William and awarded him almost the entire inheritance. Shortly before, on 17 January 1523, his mother Elisabeth of Hesse-Marburg, the original heiress, died. Charles V openly sided with William, but whatever decrees Charles sent from Burgos – Philip of Hesse ignored them. The Emperor was far away in Spain. In 1527, an imperial commission visited Siegen because of the dispute with Hesse.

The complicated political and religious circumstances of the period, including the wars Charles V had to fight against France and the Turks kept him out of the Holy Roman Empire for a long time. He also fought against the Protestant princes united in the Schmalkaldic League, gradually reducing the Emperor's interest in the Nassau cause. Henry died in 1538, and William leaned more openly towards the Protestant side.

In the course of the dispute, armed raids on Dillenburg Castle were repeatedly planned. Shortly after the Tübingen verdict was announced, in June 1523 William feared that Philip had mobilised against him in order to overrun him and drive him out. On 1 September of the same year, he wrote to his brother Henry, saying: "der lantgraf rüst sich ernstlich, thut ein Aufgebot über das andere und lest sich oeffentlich hoeren, er wolle mich verjagen" ("the landgrave is seriously arming himself, issuing one summons after another and is publicly announcing that he wants to expel me"). At the same time, William asked for at least 2,000 guilders, which he needed for defence. Similarly, in 1525 and 1528, Philip again took up arms with Saxony to get the County of Katzenelnbogen permanently in his hands. Then, too, William expected a surprise attack on Dillenburg. William not only had Heunstein Castle and the Eschenburg occupied with his countrymen to protect his border against Hesse, but also, from about 1525, had Dillenburg Castle put in the strongest state of defence. He had new bastions built and equipped with cannons. Major fortifications had been under construction since 1525, as a letter from Henry dated 2 February 1526 reads:

"Mir hat E.L. bot angezeigt, wie ir den thorn in Dillenburg oben im schloß und fast anders habt abwerfen, abgraben, verendern, bessern und stark machen lassen und des noch täglich im Werk seid. Dweil ich nu der vorigen gestalt und gelegenheit des schloß wol wissen hab, so bit ich E.L. wull mir das schloß wie ir das nu gemacht habt und zu machen fürhabt, mit den jetzigen veranderungen und befestigungen, sovil muglich, thun entwerfen und zuschreiben, damit ich das auch sehen und versteen muge." (In English: "I have been shown by E.L.'s messenger how you have had the tower in Dillenburg at the top of the castle and almost everything else removed, excavated, repaired, improved and reinforced, and how it is still in progress daily. As I am only well acquainted with the former form of the castle, I request E.L. to design and describe to me the castle, as you have now made it and intend to make it, with the present alterations and fortifications, as far as possible, so that I may also see and understand it.").

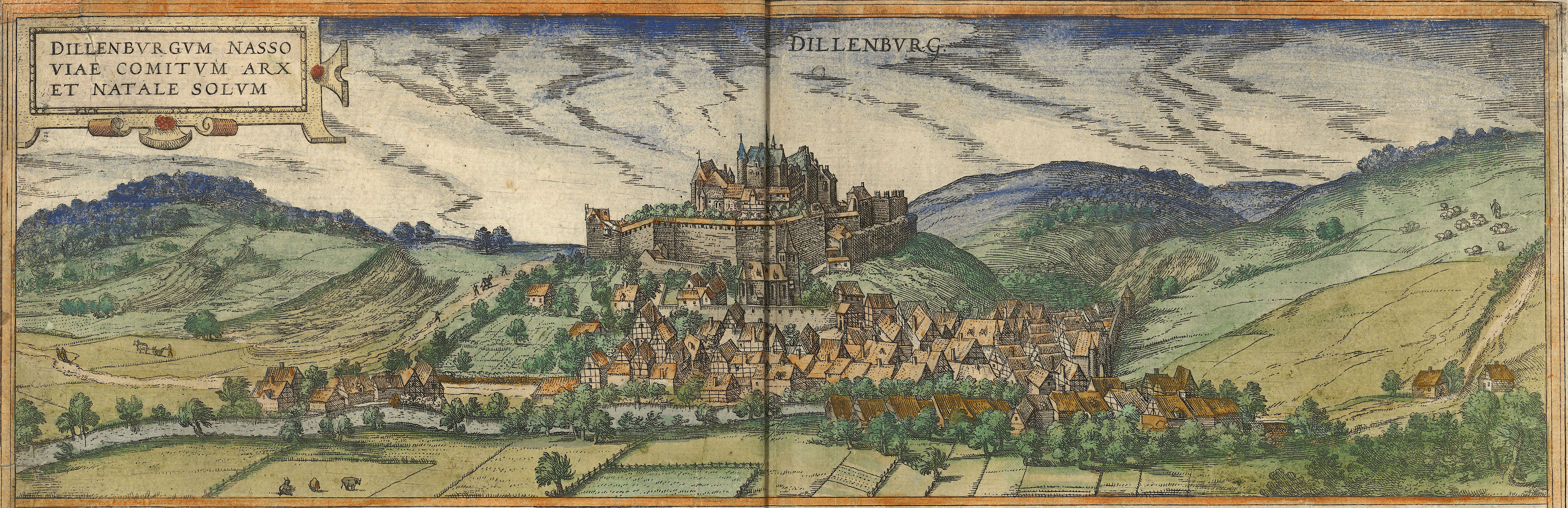
The oldest surviving image of the city of Dillenburg with on the top of the mountain the reinforced castle with the high wall. In front of the high wall is the city church. Print by Frans Hogenberg, 1575. Rijksmuseum, Amsterdam.

At that time, construction of the Hohen Mauer (high wall) began under the leadership of Utz or Ulrich von Anspach, who had been Burgrave of Ginsburg Castle since 1516. The colossal structure was 300m long and 20m high. In December 1531, the construction of the wall was still being built, when William wrote to his brother that he had only just begun the heavy foundation work for the fortress, which is still entirely unfinished and requires great foresight. On 24 May 1533, he again described to him his difficult situation: because the landgrave "allenthalben an ihn stoße, könnte er nit wohl sicher aus seinem Haus reiten oder gehn" ("collided with him everywhere, he could not safely ride or go out of his house") and was therefore "zu einem bau und festung höchlich verursacht" ("compelled to a construction and fortification in a high degree").

Philip regarded William as his worst and greatest enemy and adversary, and in 1535 called him a "papistischen Diener" (papist servant), who, like his brother Henry, was "subservient to the House of Burgundy", and wanted to deprive him of the largest and best part of his inherited princely land and people. Meanwhile, the protracted court case had cost a lot, and there was no end in sight to the resulting expenditure. Defences and constant preparedness against Hesse's threats also eroded the county's capital strength. They lacked money for the continuation of the massive construction. On 27 March 1536, William asked for an allowance of 20,000 guilders to purchase gunsmiths, guns, gunpowder, bullets and a sufficient garrison in the castle. The construction, though difficult, had to be completed, otherwise all other armament would be in vain. Henry promised his brother 10,000 guilders, but could only give the 1,600-2,000 guilders in the meanwhile, which could only be spent or invested on munitions and construction, and not on other thing. From 1539, alongside Ulrich von Anspach was artillery master Johann Opferkampf, who at that time not only supervised all the artillery at the castle, but also cast his own cannons from models he made in the count's carpentry workshop. In 1547, a cistern was constructed as a precaution for a siege. As of 1529, a fountain stood in the centre of the castle's courtyard.

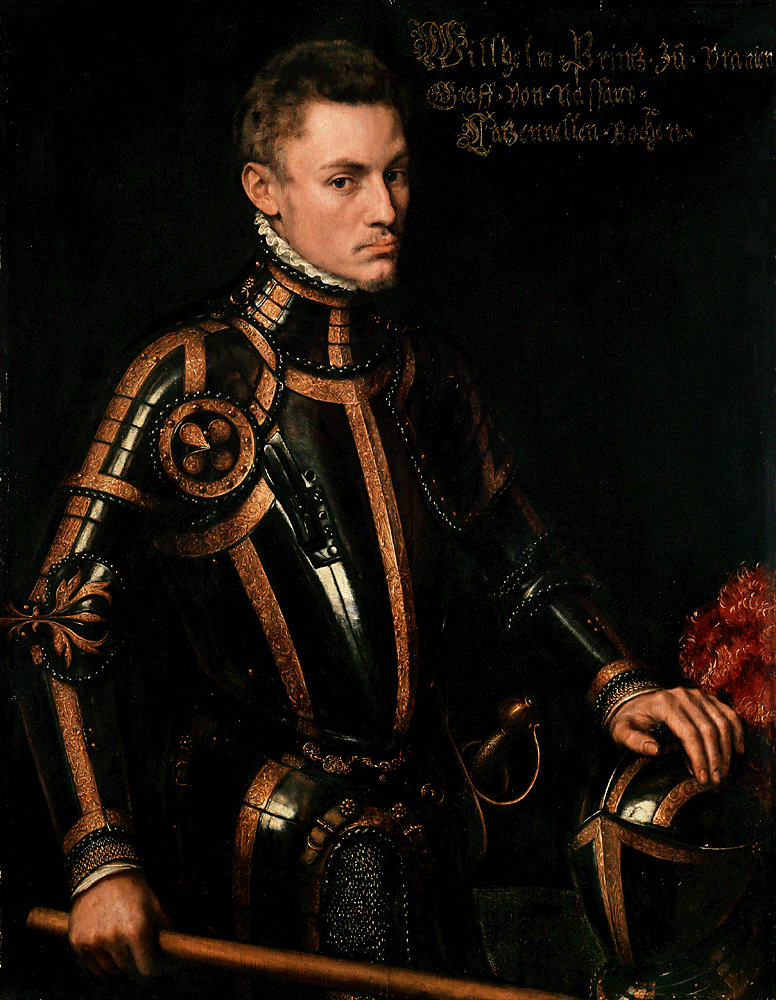
William, Prince of Orange, William's eldest son. Portrait by Antonis Mor, 1555. Museumslandschaft Hessen Kassel, Kassel.

In the autumn of 1551, Dillenburg received threatening news, and feared a new invasion. William wrote to his son Prince William of Orange on 6 December 1551, saying: "one could get from the land of Hesse to Dillenburg in one day". Johann Opferkampf was hastily sent to the Netherlands to order and recruit 50–60 good soldiers for the castle, and requested money, gunpowder and a gunsmith. His recruitment was successful, as from early 1552 there were 60 Dutch soldiers at Dillenburg Castle, some of whom stayed there until July. At this time, the city church was also included in the fortification system of the castle, and as can still be clearly seen in the oldest images of the city, the cemetery wall was equipped with firing holes. Precautions were also taken for the security of the city at this time. The city account of 1550/51 mentions not only the conclusion of a contract with masons for the extension of the city gate, but also the expenses for four masons who worked on this gate for 74 days, in addition to about 20 residents who broke stones, threw sand and made food, and for wagoners, who brought stones and wood to the construction site with an escort crew of 52 men.

Though William was successful in his role as mediator, he could not easily obtain his rights and inheritance for himself. On several occasions, the opponents met to agree on an amicable settlement, but Philip of Hesse broke his word severally. When Philip returned home after six years of imprisonment in Mechelen, he asked for free passage through the County of Nassau. William granted him hospitality at Siegen Castle 10 September 1552, despite everything that had preceded it. Philip offered much in return, but did not keep his promise. There was never a Hessian attack on Dillenburg because of the extremely strong fortification of the castle, with high walls.

The coat of arms of William the Rich since 1557, with in the second quarter the coat of arms of the County of Katzenelnbogen.

After years of fruitless negotiations, an agreement with Hesse was finally reached in Frankfurt on 30 June 1557 through the mediation of Electors Otto Henry of the Palatinate and Augustus of Saxony and the Dukes Christoph of Württemberg and William V of Jülich. Hesse paid 600,000 guilders (Note: Van Stipriaan (2021), p. 121 and Kolb (1898), p. 129 mention the same sum. Lück (1981), p. 47 mentions the sum of 450,000 guilders, i.e. he subtracted the sum of 150,000 guilders Nassau had to pay from the 600,000 guilders. Van Ditzhuyzen (2004), p. 250 does not mention an amount but speaks only of a considerable sum of money.) to Nassau (which was less than 10% of Nassau's claims from 1555, recognised by several imperial judgements), but ceded for 150.000 guilders to Nassau: the Hessian share of the County of Diez (¼) (which had been sold by the Lords of Eppstein to the Counts of Katzenelnbogen), the districts of Camberg (¼), Altweilnau, Wehrheim (¼), Ellar, Driedorf, as well as half of Hadamar (i.e. Niederhadamar, or Dehrn (Note: "Niederhadamar was not incorporated into Hadamar until 1939. In the 16th century it was the seat of the district of Dehrn. In 1557, three-quarters of the village of Dehrn was assigned to the Count of Nassau; the remaining quarter did not go to Nassau until 1775 (see Spielmann (1909), p. 198; Historische Stätten Deutschlands, IV, 183 and 80).")) and the Esterau. The castle, city and district of Herborn were freed from the ancient Hessian fealty and came entirely under Nassau. Hesse was to pay 450,000 guilders in cash in such a way that 150,000 guilders was to be paid on 28 December 1557, 45,000 guilders was to be paid annually, from 1559 to 1564, and 30,000 guilders was to be paid in 1565. Hesse fulfilled its payment obligations. It was significant, and it meant recognition of the legal claims of the Counts of Nassau, that they were allowed to use the title Count of Katzenelnbogen and the county's coat of arms, which area, however, definitively came to Hesse. The agreement was signed by Philip of Hesse and William, and also by William's eldest son Prince William of Orange. It was a provisional agreement; various details were discussed for another year.

In March 1558, the final agreement was signed at the Imperial Diet in Frankfurt. In April of that year, the ceded districts of Driedorf, Ellar, Hadamar and Camberg were transferred by Hesse to Nassau. This ended a dispute that had lasted more than half a century and had cost large sums of money. This could be roughly measured by the fact that Nassau had consulted 54 lawyers for the lawsuits alone. The greatest burden was on William, who was assisted in the final years by his eldest son. For William, the settlement brought with it a considerable enlargement of his territory, giving the area to the right of the River Lahn a considerably greater unity and completion. With the acquisition of Altweilnau, Camberg and Wehrheim across the Lahn, his territory was now bordering the territory of the Walramian Line of the House of Nassau.

The Counts of Nassau had not only fought because of the inheritance, but also as a representative of the Imperial Estates and as an advocate of a rule of law against the emerging power states of absolute princes, of which the Landgraves of Hesse proved to be the typical representatives. The preservation of the Imperial Estates became a life task for the House of Nassau. Without the stronghold Nassau, princely power would have removed the influence of the imperial immediate nobility, clergy and the free imperial cities on the fate of the nation. With that, the Holy Roman Empire would have irrevocably disintegrated. In the dispute over the County of Katzenelnbogen with a much stronger opponent, the Counts of Nassau acquired the strength that later enabled them to withstand the great trials in the Netherlands. Empires of which the counts and other Imperial Estates were the bearers, had become bloodless in the 16th century. The leaders of the counts and lords in this struggle were Counts of Nassau.

To prove his entitlement to this resistance, William's counsellor Wilhelm Knüttel, who held office in Siegen, compiled a work on the genealogy of the House of Nassau. Although it does not hold up to modern-day scrutiny, it did have an impact at the time, mainly due to his appeal to the charisma (royal salvation) that had come to Nassau through Roman King Adolf. The Counts of Nassau were helped by similar ideas in a writing prepared by the imperial counsellor Lazarus von Schwendi. The Counts from the County of Nassau were impressed, especially those who had united in the Wetterauer Grafenverein.

== Final years, death, and succession ==
The resolution of the dispute over the County of Katzenelnbogen, coupled with Landgrave Philip of Hesse's decision to partition Hesse, under pressure from his second wife, who he lived with in notorious bigamy, eliminated barriers to reconciliation between Hesse and Nassau. Consequently, the relationship between the two regions improved significantly. However, the County of Nassau suffered severe financial setbacks as a result of this conflict. Despite an annual income of 50,000 guilders, the county was in debt of 512,576 guilders. With annual interest payments of 25,684 consuming half of its income, the county faced financial strain. Although the settlement of Frankfurt mandated that Hesse pay large sums of money in instalments for the County of Katzenelnbogen, these payments fell far short of resolving the county's financial issues.

Despite the debts, William continued to host elaborate celebrations at court. One notable celebration was the triple wedding festivities held on 6 June 1559 in Dillenburg, an occasion seldom equalled in the history of the castle and city. (Note: The sources disagree on the date when the wedding took place. Becker (1983), p. 56 states the date 6 June for the three weddings. Van Ditzhuyzen (2004), p. 152 and Lück (1981), p. 82 state the date 6 June for John's wedding, but do not mention that it was a triple wedding, nor do they mention Anne and Elisabeth. Menk (1994), p. 120 states the date 16 June for John's wedding, and also does not mention that it was a triple wedding, nor does he mention Anne and Elisabeth. Schutte (1979), p. 224 states the date 6 June for John's wedding, the date 16 June for Anne's wedding and the date 6 or 16 June for Elisabeth's wedding. Dek (1970) states the date 16 June for the weddings of John (p. 83) and Anne and Elisabeth (p. 74). Dek (1968) states the same date for the weddings of John (p. 229) and Anne and Elisabeth (p. 231). Vorsterman van Oyen (1882) states the date 6 June for the weddings of John (p. 110) and Elisabeth (p. 100) and the date 16 June for Anne's wedding (p. 100). The ambiguity about the wedding date appears to have existed for a long time, as Textor von Haiger (1617) states the date '6. Junii (al. 16.)' for John's wedding (p. 113) and the date '16. (al. 6.) Junii' for the weddings of Anne and Elisabeth (p. 111).) His son John married the young Landgravine Elisabeth of Leuchtenberg, and his daughters Anne and Elisabeth married the counts Albert of Nassau-Weilburg and Konrad of Solms-Braunfels respectively.

The feast, as detailed by Rentmeister Gottfried Hatzfeld was funded by a significant cash windfall, resulting from the resolution of the Katzenelnbogen succession dispute, which funded gifts given to Anne and Elisabeth. The event took place against the backdrop of the expanded and exquisitely adorned Dillenburg Castle, which had undergone renovations between 1550 and 1553 to serve as the family's residence. The castle's architecture was inspired by the Spanish-Burgundian court at the Dutch noble courts, and was praised by Hatzfeld with the words "Wenn es nit hett diesen herren, eines Keysers haus wer es mit ehren" ("if it did not belong to this lord, an Emperor's house it would be with honour"). (Note: Most Dutch sources ignore the court celebrations and artistic decoration of Dillenburg Castle. For example, Van Stipriaan (2021), p. 29, writes: "Compared to the self-confident grandeur displayed by Henry III in Breda, things were much more austere three hundred kilometres to the east at his brother William the Rich's castle." And Van Ditzhuyzen (2004), p. 250 writes: "The result of the years of struggle was that William and Juliane's large family was constantly in debt and had to live frugally. Things were therefore significantly simpler at their court at Dillenburg than at the worldly court in Breda of his brother Henry, and his son René of Chalon. Here no elaborate court, but a comparatively frugal existence in a militarily fortified castle.")

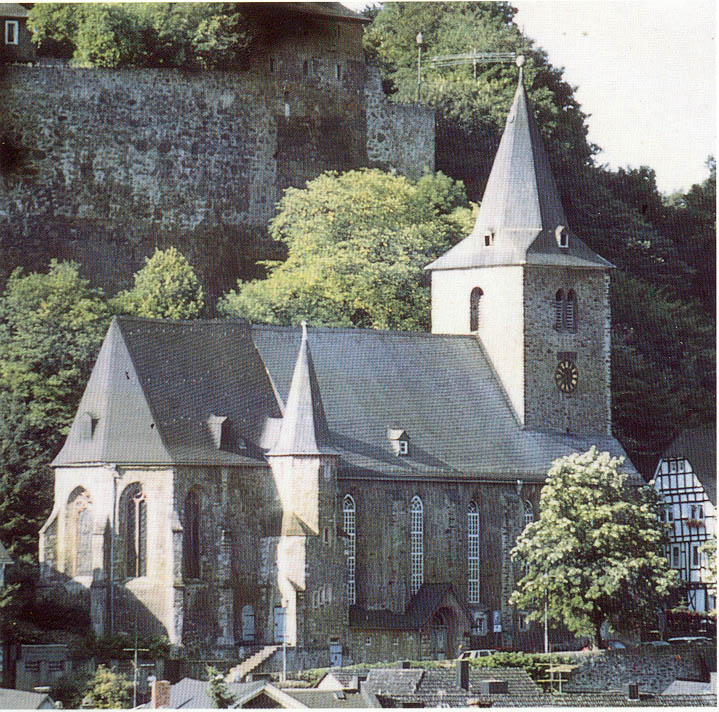
The Evangelische Stadtkirche in Dillenburg, 2014.

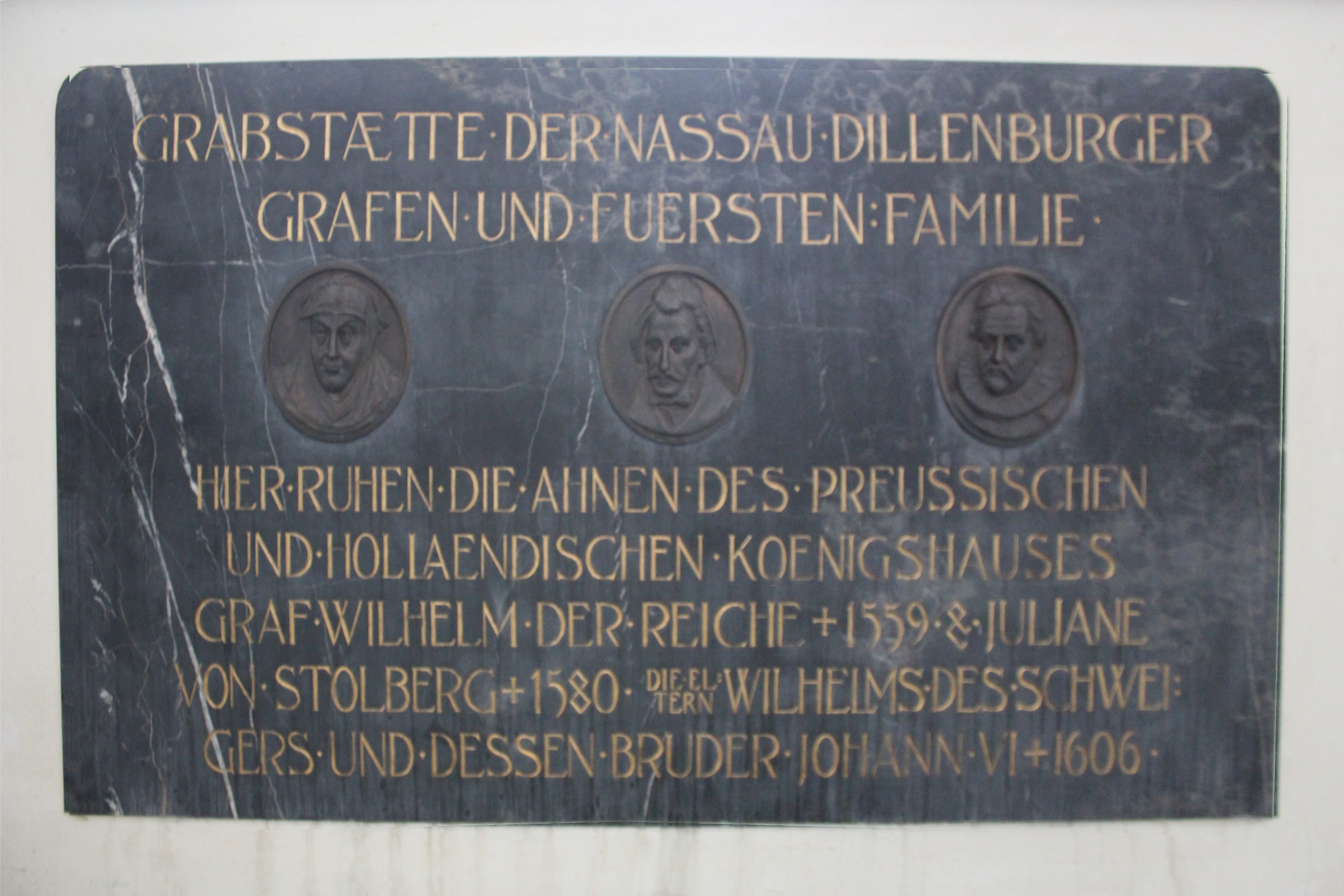
The commemorative plaque for William, his second wife Juliane and their second son John in the choir of the city church in Dillenburg, 2019.

William outlived the Friedensschluß with Hesse by only two years. He died in Dillenburg on 6 October 1559. (Note: Becker (1983), p. 57 and Vorsterman van Oyen (1882), p. 97 specify that the death took place at Dillenburg Castle.) A day before his death, in his last will, signed at Dillenburg, he recorded that he wished to be buried "in der Kirchen eine, Siegen oder Dillenburg" ("in the church of Siegen or Dillenburg"), according to the wishes of his wife Juliane and his sons John, Louis, Adolf and Henry, without pomp and circumstance, but with a Leichenpredigt. The date of his funeral has remained unknown. His biography states that his burial took place in the choir of the Dillenburg parish church, which is the Fürstengruft in the Evangelische Stadtkirche. His eldest son could not attend the funeral. William was succeeded by his sons John, Louis, Adolf and Henry. They divided the county in 1560, but John exercised the administration on behalf of his younger brothers. On the extinction of the House of Nassau-Beilstein with the death of Count John III in 1561, the four brothers inherited the County of Nassau-Beilstein. Their father had signed a house treaty with John III for this purpose in 1554.

== Explanation of the nicknames ==
=== The Elder ===
During William's lifetime, it was not customary for reigning counts to be numbered as kings were. When a father and son shared the same given name, it was necessary to distinguish between them. In this case, the father was referred to as Wilhelm der Ältere (the Elder) and the son as Wilhelm der Jüngere (the Younger). This is practice is akin to the modern custom where father and son with the same given name and surname are distinguished by the addition of Sr. (senior) and Jr. (junior) respectively. The younger William later became known as William the Silent, Prince of Orange.

=== The Rich ===
The origin of the nickname "the Rich" attributed to William I is not definitely known, nor is the timing of when he acquired this epithet. Dutch historian Reinildis van Ditzhuyzen suggests that it may have been due to his large number of children, although William's actual wealth was not remarkable. Dutch hagiographies of William the Silent attribute the nickname to his abundance of children, rather than his financial prosperity. (Note: See, for example, Kuipers, Jan J.B. (2018). Willem van Oranje. Prins in Opstand (in Dutch). Zutphen: Uitgeversmaatschappij Walburg Pers. p. 8. ISBN 978-94-6249-344-5.)

This explanation is challenged by German historian Alfred Lück, who asserts that William was already known as der Reiche Nassau during the German Peasants' War in 1524–1525, a time when he had only one daughter, which does not constitute a large family.

Another explanation proposed by German historian Richard Kolb is that contemporaries may have bestowed the title "the Rich" on William, possibly following the Katzenelnbogen inheritance. With an annual income of 50,000 guilders and ownership of numerous iron smelters, farmsteads, meadows, and arable land, William would have been considered wealthy by his subjects.

== Marriages and issue ==
=== First marriage ===
William married Countess Walburga of Egmont (Note: Given name in accordance with Van Stipriaan (2021), p. 20, Lück (1981), p. 41 and Dek (1970), p. 72. The given name Walburgis in Van Ditzhuyzen (2004), p. 249 and Schutte (1979), p. 43, Walpurgis in Becker (1983), p. 55, Walburgia in Dek (1968), p. 228, and Walburg in Vorsterman van Oyen (1882), p. 98.) (c. 1489 –7 March 1529) in Koblenz on 29 May 1506. She was the eldest daughter of Count John III of Egmont and Countess Magdalene of Werdenberg.

William and Walburga gave birth to: (Note: One can find the claim that Walburga and William had five children in Schipperus, P.J. (2018). Philips Willem. De verloren zoon van Willem van Oranje (in Dutch). Utrecht: Uitgeverij Omniboek. p. 21. ISBN 978-94-0191-070-5. But Van Stipriaan (2021), p. 20 confirms that there were only two daughters.)

1. Elisabeth (born in Siegen, October 1515 – (?) January 1523).
2. Magdalene (born in Siegen, 6 October 1522 – 18 August 1567), who married Count Herman of Neuenahr and Moers (1514 – 4 December 1578) on 16 July 1538.

=== Second marriage ===
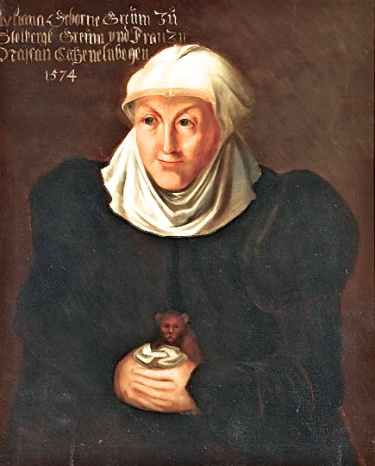
Juliane of Stolberg-Wernigerode, William's second wife. Anonymous portrait, 1574. Feudalmuseum Schloss Wernigerode.

William remarried in Siegen on 20 September 1531 (Note: Lück (1981), p. 43 specifies that the wedding took place at Siegen Castle. Van Ditzhuyzen (2004), p. 249, on the other hand, states that the wedding took place in Königstein (Taunus).) to Countess Juliane of Stolberg-Wernigerode (Note: Van Stipriaan (2021), passim, Van Ditzhuyzen (2004), p. 162 and 249, Lück (1981), p. 41 and Schutte (1979), p. 43 incorrectly shorten her name to Juliane of Stolberg.) (born in Stolberg, 15 February 1506 – died in Dillenburg, 18 June 1580), the daughter of Count Bodo III of Stolberg-Wernigerode and Countess Anne of Eppstein-Königstein. Juliane had previously been married to Count Philip II of Hanau-Münzenberg (17 August 1501 – 28 March 1529) on 9 June 1523.

William and Juliane gave birth to:

1. Prince William I the Silent of Orange (born in Dillenburg, 24 April 1533 (Note: Vorsterman van Oyen (1882), p. 101 states the date of birth 25 April 1533.) – murdered in Delft, 10 July 1584), who succeeded his cousin René in 1544 as Prince of Orange, Count of Vianden, Baron of Breda, etc. He married:
  1. in Buren on 8 July 1551 (Note: Vorsterman van Oyen (1882), p. 102 states the wedding date 6 July 1551.) to Anna van Egmont (born in Grave, March 1533 – died in Breda, (Note: Vorsterman van Oyen (1882), p. 102 states the city of Buren.) 24 March 1558), Countess of Buren, Leerdam and Lingen, etc.
  2. in Leipzig on 24 August 1561 (Note: Vorsterman van Oyen (1882), p. 102 states the wedding date 2 June 1561.) to Duchess Anne of Saxony (born in Dresden, 23 December 1544 (Note: Vorsterman van Oyen (1882), p. 102 states the date of birth 23 April 1544.) – died in Dresden, 18 December 1577). The marriage was dissolved in early 1571.
  3. in Den Briel on 12 June 1575 (Note: Dek (1970), p. 77 and Dek (1968), p. 229 state the wedding date 12 July 1575.) to Duchess Charlotte de Bourbon-Montpensier (1546/47 – died in Antwerp, 5 May 1582).
  4. in Antwerp on 12 April 1583 (Note: Dek (1970), p. 77 states the wedding date 24 April 1583.) to Countess Louise de Coligny (born in Châtillon-sur-Loing, 23 September 1555 (Note: Vorsterman van Oyen (1882), p. 103 states born Châtillon, 28 September 1555.) – died in Fontainebleau, 13 November 1620 (Note: Vorsterman van Oyen (1882), p. 103 states the date of death 9 October 1620.)).
2. Hermanna (9 August 1534 – died young).
3. Count John VI the Elder (born in Dillenburg, 22 November 1536 (Note: Vorsterman van Oyen (1882), p. 109 states the date of birth 22 November 1535.) – died in Dillenburg, 8 October 1606), who succeeded his father in 1559 and inherited the County of Nassau-Beilstein in 1561. He married:
  1. in Dillenburg on 6 or 16 June 1559 (Note: The sources disagree on the date when the wedding took place. Van Ditzhuyzen (2004), p. 152, Becker (1983), p. 56, Lück (1981), p. 82, Schutte (1979), p. 224 and Vorsterman van Oyen (1882), p. 110 state the date 6 June. Menk (1994), p. 120, Dek (1970), p. 83 and Dek (1968), p. 229 state the date 16 June. The ambiguity about the wedding date appears to have existed for a long time, as Textor von Haiger (1617), p. 113 states the date '6. Junii (al. 16.)'.) to Landgravine Elisabeth of Leuchtenberg (March 1537 – died in Dillenburg, 6 July 1579).
  2. in Dillenburg on 13 September 1580 to Countess palatine Kunigonda Jacoba (born in Simmern, 9 October 1556 (Note: Schutte (1979), p. 224 states the date of birth 1 February or 9 October 1556. Vorsterman van Oyen (1882), p. 110 states born Heidelberg, 1 February 1557.) – died in Dillenburg, 26 January 1586).
  3. in Berleburg on 14 June 1586 to Countess Johannette of Sayn-Wittgenstein (15 February 1561 – Hadamar, (Note: Schutte (1979), p. 224 and Dek (1970), p. 74 state the city of Dillenburg. Dek (1968), p. 229 and Vorsterman van Oyen (1882), p. 110 do not mention a place of death.) 13 April 1622).
4. Count Louis (born in Dillenburg, 10 January 1538 – 14 April 1574), who succeeded his father in 1559 and inherited the County of Nassau-Beilstein in 1561. He died the Battle of Mookerheyde.
5. Mary (born in Dillenburg, 18 March 1539 – Ulft Castle, 18/28 May 1599 (Note: Dek (1970), p. 74 and Dek (1968), p. 229 state died Ulft, 18 or 28 May 1599. Vorsterman van Oyen (1882), p. 99 states died Ulft Castle, January 1599.)), who married Count Willem IV van den Bergh ('s-Heerenberg, 24 December 1537 – Ulft Castle, 6 November 1586).
6. Count Adolf (born in Siegen, (Note: Schutte (1979), p. 44 states born at Dillenburg or Siegen. Dek (1968), p. 229 and Vorsterman van Oyen (1882), p. 99 state born at Dillenburg.) 11 July 1540 – 23 May 1568), who succeeded his father in 1559 and inherited the County of Nassau-Beilstein in 1561. He died the Battle of Heiligerlee,
7. Anne (born in Dillenburg, 21 September 1541 – Weilburg, 12 February 1616), who married Count Albert of Nassau-Weilburg (26 December 1537 – died in Ottweiler, 11 November 1593) in Dillenburg on 6 or 16 June 1559. (Note: The sources disagree on the date when the wedding took place. Becker (1983), p. 56 states the date 6 June. Schutte (1979), p. 224, Dek (1970), p. 74, Dek (1968), p. 231 and Vorsterman van Oyen (1882), p. 100 state the date 16 June. The ambiguity about the wedding date appears to have existed for a long time, as Textor von Haiger (1617), p. 111 states the date '16. (al. 6.) Junii'.)
8. Elisabeth (born in Dillenburg, 25 September 1542 – 18 November 1603), who married Count Konrad of Solms-Braunfels (17 June 1540 (Note: Schutte (1979), p. 44 states the date of birth 17 January or June 1540.) – 27 December 1592 (Note: Dek (1970), p. 74 and Dek (1968), p. 231 state the date of death 28 December 1592.)) in Dillenburg on 6 or 16 June 1559. (Note: The sources disagree on the date when the wedding took place. Becker (1983), p. 56 and Vorsterman van Oyen (1882), p. 100 state the date 6 June. Schutte (1979), p. 224 states the date 6 or 16 June. Dek (1970), p. 74 and Dek (1968), p. 231 state the date 16 June. The ambiguity about the wedding date appears to have existed for a long time, as Textor von Haiger (1617), p. 111 states the date '16. (al. 6.) Junii'.)
9. Catherine (born in Dillenburg, 29 December 1543 – 25 December 1624), who married Count Günther XLI 'Bellicosus' of Schwarzburg-Arnstadt (born in Arnstadt, 25 September 1529 – died in Antwerp, 23 May 1583); in Arnstadt on 17 November 1560. (Note: Vorsterman van Oyen (1882), p. 100 states the wedding date 18 November 1560.)
10. Juliane (born in Dillenburg, 10 August 1546 (Note: Schutte (1979), p. 44 states the date of birth 11 February or 10 August 1546.) – 31 August 1588), who married Count Albert VII of Schwarzburg-Rudolstadt (16 January 1537 – 10 April 1605); on 14 June 1575.
11. Magdalene (born in Dillenburg, 15 December 1547 – died in Öhringen, 16 May 1633), who married Count Wolfgang of Hohenlohe-Weikersheim (14 June 1546 – died in Weikersheim, 28 March 1610); on 27 January 1567. (Note: Schutte (1979), p. 44 states married in Dillenburg on 27 January or in Neuenstein on 14 September 1567. Vorsterman van Oyen (1882), p. 101 states the wedding date 31 January 1567.)
12. Count Henry (born in Dillenburg, 15 October 1550 – 14 April 1574), who succeeded his father in 1559 and inherited the County of Nassau-Beilstein in 1561. He was killed in the Battle of Mookerheyde.
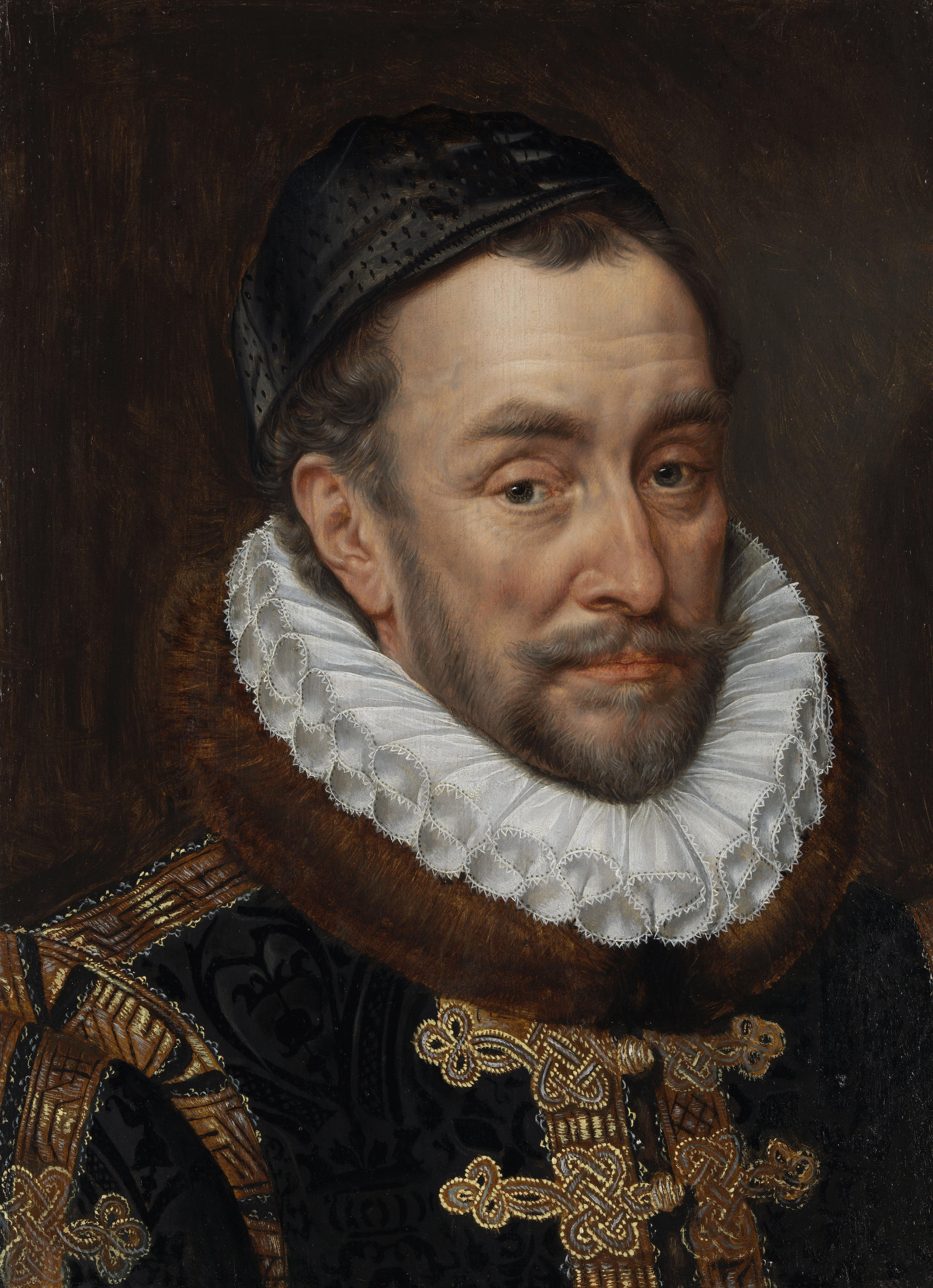
Prince William I of Orange (1533–1584). Portrait by Adriaen Thomasz. Key, 1579. Rijksmuseum, Amsterdam.

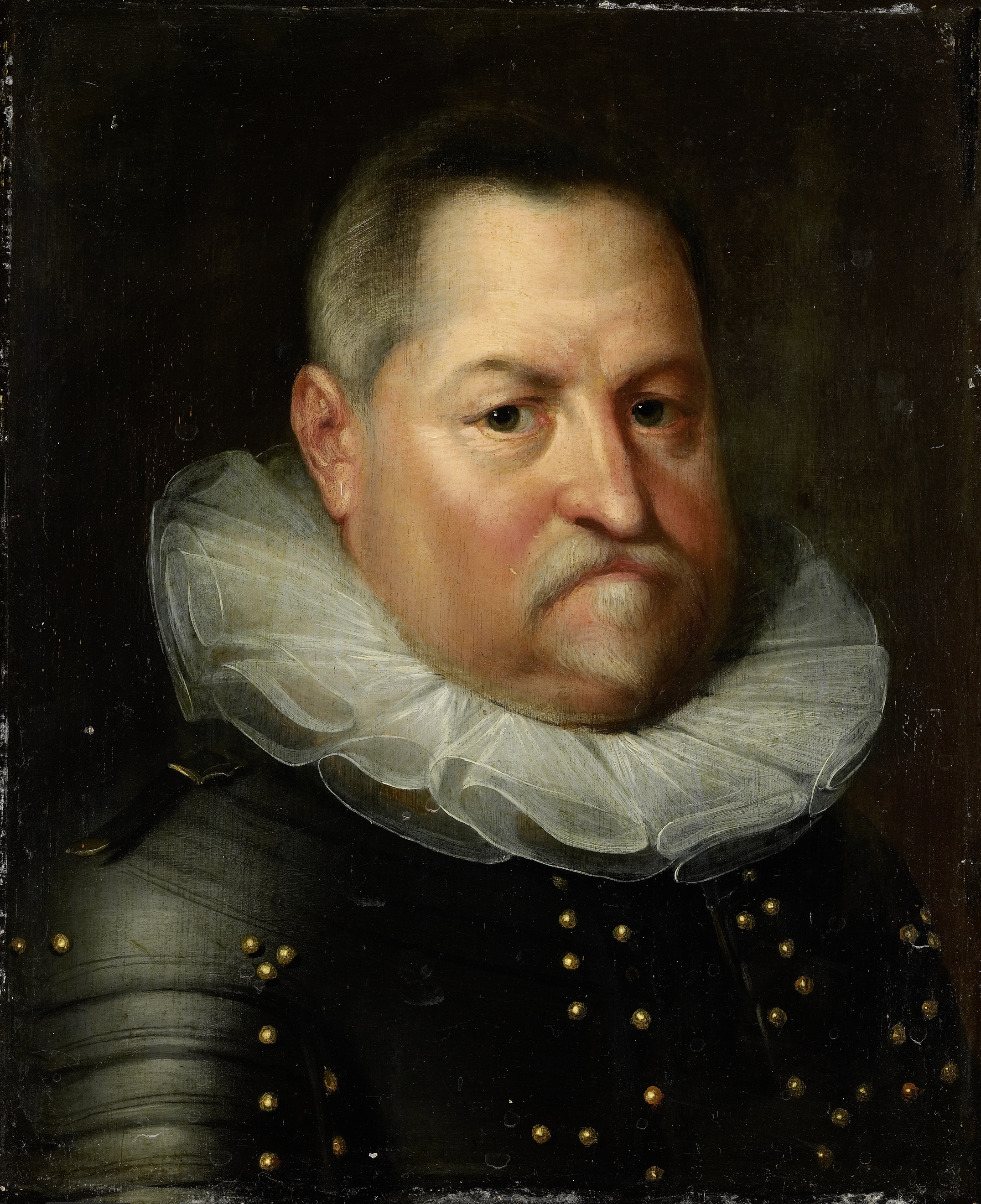
Count John VI of Nassau-Siegen (1536–1606). Anonymous portrait, 1610–1620. Rijksmuseum, Amsterdam.

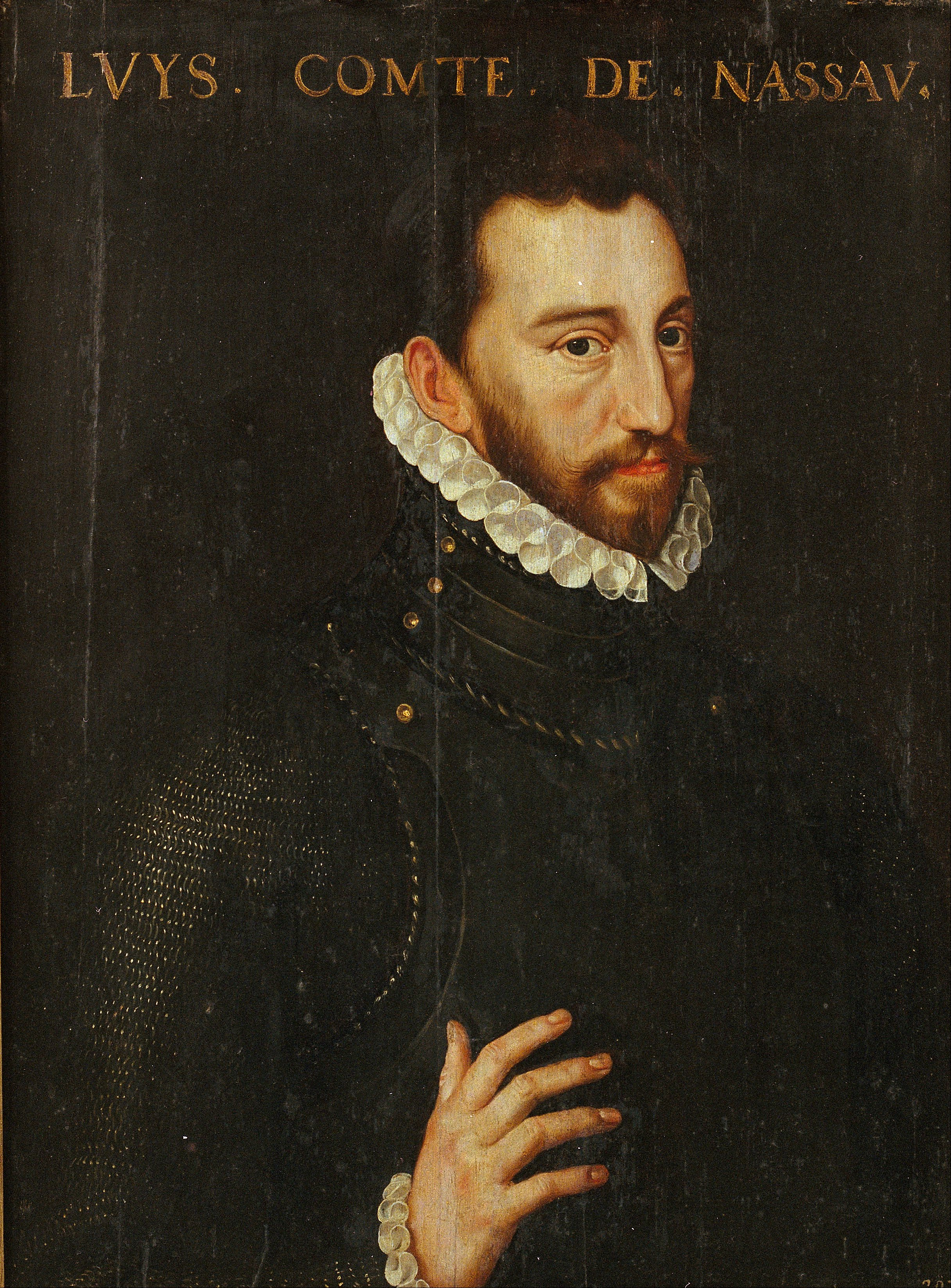
Count Louis of Nassau-Siegen (1538–1574). Portrait by Adriaen Thomasz. Key, 1570–1574. Museu Nacional d'Art de Catalunya, Barcelona.

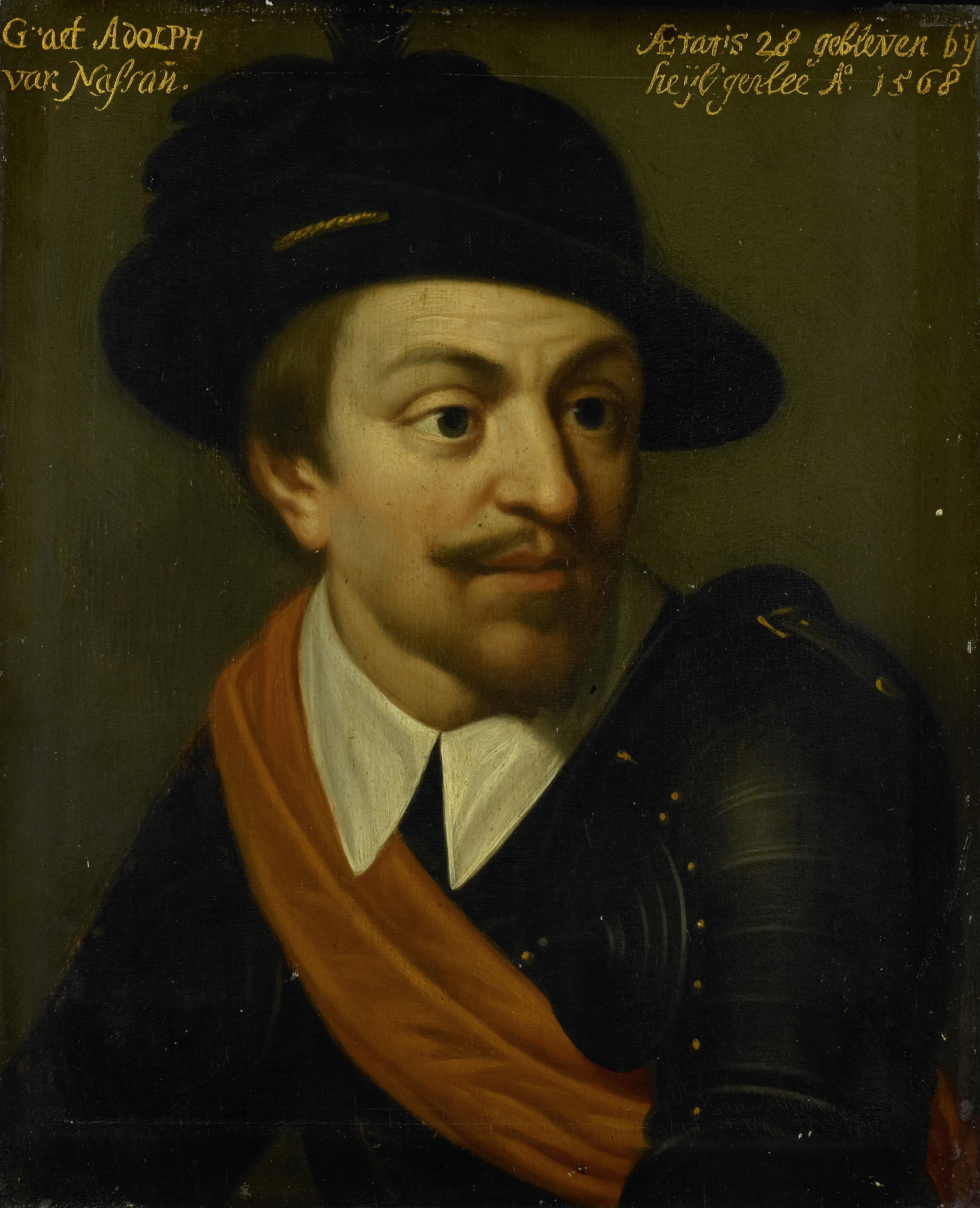
Count Adolf of Nassau-Siegen (1540–1568). Anonymous portrait, 1633–1635. Rijksmuseum, Amsterdam.

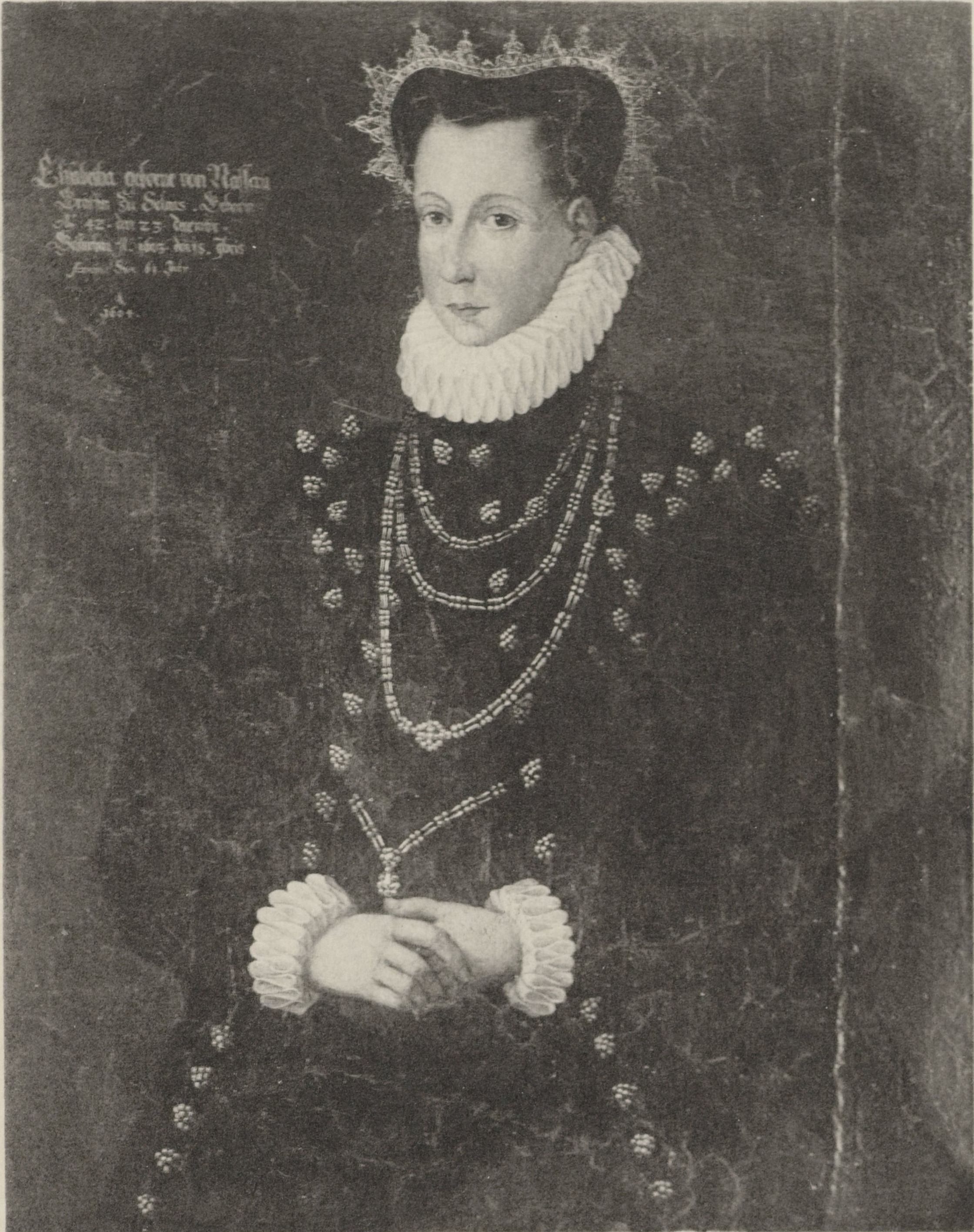
Elisabeth of Nassau-Siegen (1542–1603). Photo of an anonymous portrait. Rijksmuseum, Amsterdam.

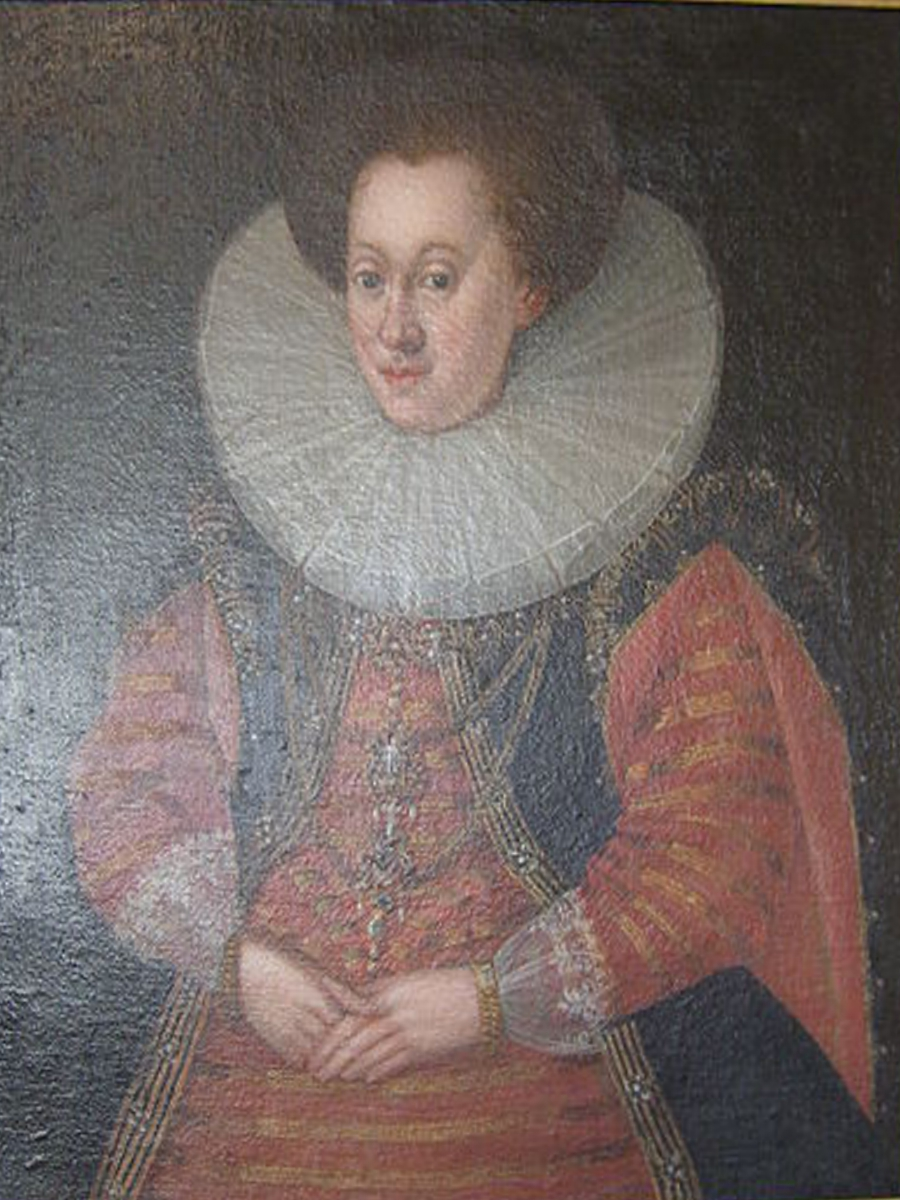
Juliane of Nassau-Siegen (1546–1588). Anonymous portrait. Heidecksburg.

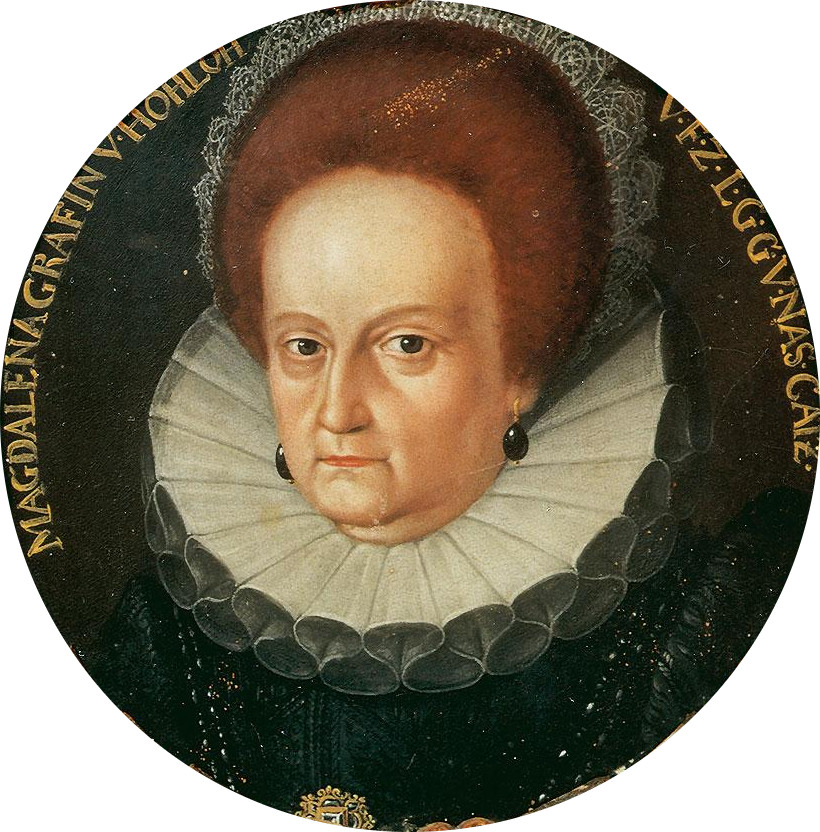
Magdalene of Nassau-Siegen (1547–1633). Anonymous portrait. Weikersheim Castle.

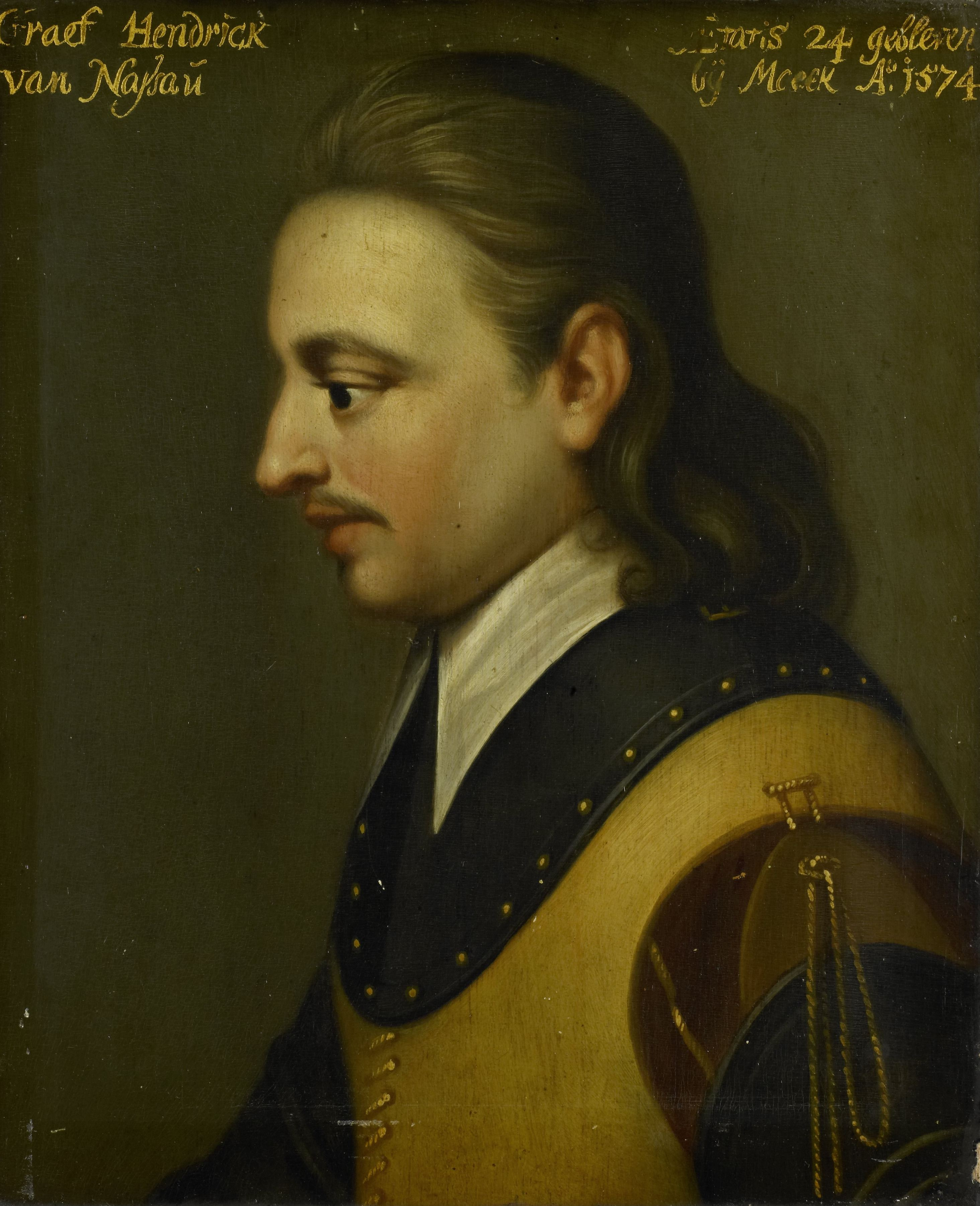
Count Henry of Nassau-Siegen (1550–1574). Anonymous portrait, 1633–1635. Rijksmuseum, Amsterdam.

=== Illegitimate child ===
William had one illegitimate son:

1. Gottfried von Nassau (d. Kirberg, Good Friday 1582), Lord of Löhnberg and Camberg, commander at Beilstein 1561–1564, Hofmeister at Dillenburg 1566–1567. He married:
  1. Anna von Wied.
  2. Irmgard Schlaun in 1557.
  3. Ursula von Bergen genannt Kessel (d. c. 1611) in c. 1577.

=== Progenitor of the Dutch royal house ===
William is considered the progenitor of the Dutch royal house. Through his eldest son, stadtholders Maurice, Frederick Henry, William II, and William III of the Dutch Republic are descendants in the male line from William. Through his second son, stadtholders William IV and William V, as well as Kings William I, William II, William III, and Queen Wilhelmina of the Netherlands, share the same lineage.

== Ancestors ==
Ancestors of Count William I of Nassau-Siegen
Great-great-grandparents	John I of Nassau-Siegen (c. 1339–1416) ⚭ 1357; Margaret of the Mark (d. 1409)	John III of Polanen (d. 1394) ⚭ 1390; Odilia of Salm (d. 1428)	Godfrey II of Heinsberg (d. 1395) ⚭ 1357; Philippa of Jülich (d. 1390)	Otto I of Solms (d. 1410) ⚭ Agnes of Falkenstein (c. 1358–1409)	Herman II the Scholar of Hesse (c. 1342–1413) ⚭ 1383; Margaret of Nuremberg (c. 1363–1406)	Frederick I the Belligerent of Saxony (1370–1428) ⚭ 1402; Catherine of Brunswick-Lüneburg (d. 1442)	John III of Katzenelnbogen (d. 1444) ⚭ 1383; Anne of Katzenelnbogen (d. 1439)	Eberhard IV the Younger of Württemberg (1388–1419) ⚭ 1397/98; Henriette of Montbéliard (1387–1444)
Great-grandparents	Engelbert I of Nassau-Siegen (c. 1370–1442) ⚭ 1403; Joanne of Polanen (1392–1445)		John II of Looz-Heinsberg (d. 1438) ⚭ 1423; Anne of Solms (d. 1433)		Louis III the Peaceful of Hesse (1402–1458) ⚭ 1433; Anne of Saxony (1420–1462)		Philip the Elder of Katzenelnbogen (c. 1402–1479) ⚭ 1422; Anne of Württemberg (1408–1471)	
Grandparents	John IV of Nassau-Siegen (1410–1475) ⚭ 1440; Mary of Looz-Heinsberg (1424–1502)				Henry III the Rich of Hesse-Marburg (1440–1483) ⚭ 1458; Anne of Katzenelnbogen (1443–1494)			
Parents	John V of Nassau-Siegen (1455–1516) ⚭ 1482; Elisabeth of Hesse-Marburg (1466–1523)							

== Sources ==
- Aßmann, Helmut & Menk, Friedhelm (1996). Auf den Spuren von Nassau und Oranien in Siegen (in German). Siegen: Gesellschaft für Stadtmarketing Siegen e.V.
- Becker, E. (1983) [1950]. Schloss und Stadt Dillenburg. Ein Gang durch ihre Geschichte in Mittelalter und Neuzeit. Zur Gedenkfeier aus Anlaß der Verleihung der Stadtrechte am 20. September 1344 herausgegeben (in German) (Neuauflage ed.). Dillenburg: Der Magistrat der Stadt Dillenburg.
- Dek, A.W.E. (1968). "De afstammelingen van Juliana van Stolberg tot aan het jaar van de Vrede van Münster". Spiegel der Historie. Maandblad voor de geschiedenis der Nederlanden (in Dutch). 1968 (7/8): 228–303.
- Dek, A.W.E. (1970). Genealogie van het Vorstenhuis Nassau (in Dutch). Zaltbommel: Europese Bibliotheek.
- Van Ditzhuyzen, Reinildis (2004) [1992]. Oranje-Nassau. Een biografisch woordenboek (in Dutch) (3rd ed.). Haarlem: Becht. ISBN 90-230-1124-4.
- Huberty, Michel; Giraud, Alain & Magdelaine, F. & B. (1981). l'Allemagne Dynastique (in French). Vol. Tome III: Brunswick-Nassau-Schwarzbourg. Le Perreux: Alain Giraud. ISBN 2-901138-03-9.
- Jansen, H.P.H. (1979). "De Bredase Nassaus". In Tamse, C.A. (ed.). Nassau en Oranje in de Nederlandse geschiedenis (in Dutch). Alphen aan den Rijn: A.W. Sijthoff. pp. 11–40. ISBN 90-218-2447-7.
- Kolb, Richard (1898). "Wilhelm (der Reiche), Graf von Nassau-Katzenellenbogen". Allgemeine Deutsche Biographie (in German). Vol. Band 43. Leipzig: Duncker & Humblot. pp. 129–131.
- Lück, Alfred (1981) [1967]. Siegerland und Nederland (in German) (2nd ed.). Siegen: Siegerländer Heimatverein e.V.
- Menk, Friedhelm (1994). "Die nassauischen Begräbnisstätten in der ev. Stadtkirche zu Dillenburg". In Pletz-Krehahn, Hans-Jürgen (ed.). 650 Jahre Stadt Dillenburg. Ein Text- und Bildband zum Stadtrechtsjubiläum der Oranierstadt (in German). Dillenburg: Verlag E. Weidenbach GmbH + Co. KG. pp. 119–125.
- Schutte, O. (1979). "Genealogische gegevens". In Tamse, C.A. (ed.). Nassau en Oranje in de Nederlandse geschiedenis (in Dutch). Alphen aan den Rijn: A.W. Sijthoff. pp. 40–44, 81–82, 109, 153–154, 186, 224–228, 271–272, 304–305, 357, 397. ISBN 90-218-2447-7.
- Spielmann, Christian (1909). Geschichte von Nassau (Land und Haus) von den ältesten Zeiten bis zur Gegenwart (in German). Vol. Teil 1. Politische Geschichten. Wiesbaden: P. Plauen.
- Van Stipriaan, René (2021). De Zwijger. Het leven van Willem van Oranje (in Dutch) (7th ed.). Amsterdam & Antwerpen: Querido Facto. ISBN 978-90-214-0275-8.
- Swart, K.W. (1979). "Willem de Zwijger". In Tamse, C.A. (ed.). Nassau en Oranje in de Nederlandse geschiedenis (in Dutch). Alphen aan den Rijn: A.W. Sijthoff. pp. 45–80. ISBN 90-218-2447-7.
- Textor von Haiger, Johann (1617). Nassauische Chronik. In welcher des vralt, hochlöblich, vnd weitberühmten Stamms vom Hause Naßaw, Printzen vnd Graven Genealogi oder Stammbaum: deren geburt, leben, heurath, kinder, zu Friden- vnd Kriegszeiten verzichtete sachen und thaten, absterben, und sonst denckwürdige Geschichten. Sampt einer kurtzen general Nassoviae und special Beschreibung der Graf- und Herschaften Naßaw-Catzenelnbogen, etc (in German). Herborn: Christoph Raab.
- Vorsterman van Oyen, A.A. (1882). Het vorstenhuis Oranje-Nassau. Van de vroegste tijden tot heden (in Dutch). Leiden & Utrecht: A.W. Sijthoff & J.L. Beijers.

William I of Nassau-Siegen House of Nassau-Siegen Born: 10 April 1487 Died: 6 October 1559
Regnal titles
Preceded by John V	Count of Nassau-Siegen; 30 July 1516 – 6 October 1559	Succeeded by John VI the Elder; Louis; Adolf; Henry
Preceded by John V	Count of Diez; 30 July 1516 – 6 October 1559	Succeeded by John VI the Elder; Louis; Adolf; Henry
