= John II of Nassau-Beilstein =

John II, Count of Nassau-Beilstein
- Died: 1513
- Noble family: House of Nassau
- Spouses: Maria of Solms-Braunfels; Anna of Lippe
- Father: Henry IV, Count of Nassau-Beilstein
- Mother: Eva of Sayn

John II, Count of Nassau-Beilstein (died 1513) was a son of Count Henry IV and his wife, Eva of Sayn. His father was son of John I, Count of Nassau-Beilstein, who in turn was son of Henry II, Count of Nassau-Beilstein.

John II married, in 1492, with Maria of Solms-Braunfels (1471–1505). They had the following children:

- John III (1490–1561)
- Henry V (d. 1525)
- Hermanna (d. 1584)
- Eva (d. 1575)

In 1499, he succeeded his father as the ruling Count of Nassau-Beilstein.

John II of Nassau-Beilstein House of Nassau Died: 1513
Preceded by Henry IV	Count of Nassau-Beilstein; 1499–1513	Succeeded by John III and Henry V
