= John III of Nassau-Beilstein =

Count of Nassau-Beilstein (1513–1561)

John III, Count of Nassau-Beilstein
- Born: 1490
- Died: 11 December 1561
- Noble family: House of Nassau
- Spouse: Anna of Nassau-Weilburg
- Father: John II, Count of Nassau-Beilstein
- Mother: Maria of Solms-Braunfels

John III, Count of Nassau-Beilstein (1490 – 11 December 1561) was a son of John II and his wife Maria of Solms-Braunfels.

In 1513, he succeeded his father as Count of Nassau-Beilstein. In 1523, he married Anna (1505–1564), a daughter of Louis I (1473–1523) of Nassau-Weilburg and Margaret of Nassau-Wiesbaden (1487–1548).

He died on 11 December 1561. As he had no male heir, Nassau-Beilstein fell back to Nassau-Dillenburg. He may have had a son, Jonas/Hans, but more documentation is needed to confirm. It is unclear why this son, if he existed, did not inherit his father's title.

John III of Nassau-Beilstein House of Nassau Born: 1490 Died: 11 December 1561
Preceded by John II	Count of Nassau-Beilstein; 1513–1561	Succeeded by Henry III as Count of Nassau-Dillenburg
