= List of Nassau consorts =

Nassau nobility

The following is a list of the consorts of Nassau princes from 1255 to 1797.

== The Walram Line ==
=== Countess and Princess of Nassau-Saarbrücken (1429–1797) ===
Picture	Name	Father	Birth	Marriage	Became Consort	Ceased to be Consort	Death	Spouse
	Princess Sophie of Erbach-Erbach	Count George William of Erbach (Erbach-Erbach)	12 July 1725	28 February 1742		24 July 1768 husband's death	10 June 1795	William Henry
	Princess Wilhelmina of Schwarzburg-Rudolstadt	John Frederick, Prince of Schwarzburg-Rudolstadt (Schwarzburg-Rudolstadt)	22 January 1751	30 Oct 1766	24 July 1768 husband's ascension	17 July 1780		Louis
	Marie Françoise de St.Maurice, Princess de Montbarrey	Alexandre Marie Léonor de Saint-Mauris, Prince de Montbarrey (Montbarrey)	2 November 1761	2 September 1785	2 March 1794 husband's ascension	27 April 1797 husband's death	2 February 1838	Henry

==== Countess of Nassau-Ottweiler (1640–1728) ====
Picture	Name	Father	Birth	Marriage	Became Consort	Ceased to be Consort	Death	Spouse
	Countess Palatine Dorothea Catherine of Birkenfeld-Bischweiler	Christian I, Count Palatine of Birkenfeld-Bischweiler (Wittelsbach)	3 July 1634	6 Oct 1649		9 February 1690 husband's death	7 December 1715	John Louis
	Countess Christiane of Ahlefeld-Rixingen	Frederik, Count of Ahlefeldt-Rixingen (Ahlefeldt-Rixingen)	21 April 1659	28 July 1680	9 February 1690 husband's ascension	22 October 1695		Frederick Louis
	Countess Louise Sophie of Hanau-Lichtenberg	Johann Reinhard II, Count of Hanau-Lichtenberg (Hanau-Lichtenberg)	11 April 1662	27 September 1697		25 May 1728	9 April 1751	Frederick Louis

=== Princess of Nassau-Usingen (1659–1816) ===
Picture	Name	Father	Birth	Marriage	Became Consort	Ceased to be Consort	Death	Spouse
	Comtesse Catherine Françoise de Croÿ-Roeulx	Eustache II de Croÿ, Comte de Roeulx, Baron de Beaurain (Croÿ)	-	16 June 1678		20 May 1686		Walrad
	Countess Magdalena Elizabeth of Löwenstein-Wertheim-Rochefort	Ferdinand Karl, Count of Löwenstein-Wertheim-Rochefort (Löwenstein-Wertheim)	17 August 1662	18 June 1688		17 October 1702 husband's death	5 June 1733	Walrad
	Charlotte Amalia of Nassau-Dillenburg	Henry, Prince of Nassau-Dillenburg (Nassau)	13 June 1680	15 April 1706		14 February 1718 husband's death	11 October 1738	William Henry
	Duchess Christine Wilhelmine of Saxe-Eisenach	John William III, Duke of Saxe-Eisenach (Saxe-Eisenach)	3 September 1711	26 November 1734		27 November 1740		Charles
	Countess Caroline Felizitas of Leiningen-Dagsburg	Christian Karl Reinhard of Leiningen-Dagsburg-Falkenburg (Leiningen)	22 May 1734	16 April 1760	21 June 1775 husband's ascension	17 May 1803 husband's death	8 May 1810	Charles William
	Princess Luise of Waldeck and Pyrmont	Karl August, Prince of Waldeck and Pyrmont (Waldeck)	29 January 1751	9 June 1775	17 May 1803	24 March 1816 husband elevate a Duke	17 November 1816	Frederick Augustus

=== Nassau-Weilburg (1344–1816) ===
==== Countess of Nassau-Weilburg (1344–1688) ====
Picture	Name	Father	Birth	Marriage	Became Consort	Ceased to be Consort	Death	Spouse
								Philip III
	Anna of Nassau-Dillenburg	William I, Count of Nassau-Siegen (Nassau)	21 September 1541	16 June 1559	4 October 1559 husband's ascension	11 November 1593 husband's death	12 February 1616	Albert
	Countess Erika of Manderscheid-Blankenheim	Franz, Graf von Manderscheid-Blankenheim (Manderscheid)	c.1546	9 April 1563		30 December 1581		Philip IV
	Countess Elisabeth of Nassau-Dillenburg	Johann VI, Count of Nassau-Dillenburg (Nassau)	24 January 1564	3 October 1583		12 March 1602 husband's death	5 May 1611	Philip IV
	Anna Maria of Hesse-Kassel	William IV, Landgrave of Hesse-Kassel (Hesse-Kassel)	27 January 1567	8 June 1589	1593	21 November 1626		Louis II
	Anna Amalie of Baden-Durlach	Georg Friedrich, Margrave of Baden-Durlach (Zähringen)	9 July 1595	25 November 1615	1627 husband's ascension	1629; Nassau-Weilburg divided	18 November 1651	William Louis
	Sibylla Magdalena of Baden-Durlach	Georg Friedrich, Margrave of Baden-Durlach (Zähringen)	21 July 1605	6 June 1629		1629; Nassau-Weilburg divided	22 July 1644	John
	Anna Maria of Sayn-Wittgenstein-Sayn	Wilhelm III, Count of Sayn-Wittgenstein-Sayn (Sayn-Wittgenstein-Sayn)	c.1610	22 February 1634		16 April 1655	14 January 1656	Ernest Casimir
	Countess Christiane Elisabeth of Sayn-Wittgenstein-Homburg	Ernst, Count of Sayn-Wittgenstein in Homburg (Sayn-Wittgenstein-Homburg)	27 August 1643	26 May 1663		8 September 1675	29 April 1678	Frederick
	Countess Maria Polyxena of Leiningen-Dagsburg-Hartenburg	Friedrich Emich, Count of Leiningen-Dagsburg-Hartenburg (Leiningen)	7 February 1662	3 April 1683	8 September 1675 husband's ascension	1688 husband elevated a Prince	22 April 1725	John Ernst

==== Princess of Nassau-Weilburg (1688–1816) ====
Picture	Name	Father	Birth	Marriage	Became Consort	Ceased to be Consort	Death	Spouse
	Countess Maria Polyxena of Leiningen-Dagsburg-Hartenburg	Friedrich Emich, Count of Leiningen-Dagsburg-Hartenburg (Leiningen)	7 February 1662	3 April 1683	1688 husband elevated a Prince	27 February 1719 husband's death	22 April 1725	John Ernst
	Princess Auguste Friederike Wilhelmine of Nassau-Idstein	George August, Count of Nassau-Idstein (Nassau)	17 August 1699	17 August 1723		8 June 1750		Charles August
	Princess Carolina of Orange-Nassau	William IV, Prince of Orange (Orange-Nassau)	28 February 1743	5 March 1760		6 May 1787		Charles Christian
	Burgravine Louise Isabelle of Kirchberg	Wilhelm Georg, Count of Sayn-Hachenburg, Burgrave of Kirchberg (Sayn-Wittgenstein-Hachenburg)	19 April 1772	31 July 1788	28 November 1788 husband's ascension	9 January 1816 husband's death	6 January 1827	Frederick William
	Princess Louise of Saxe-Hildburghausen	Frederick, Duke of Saxe-Altenburg (Saxe-Hildburghausen)	28 January 1794	24 June 1814	9 January 1816 husband's ascension	24 March 1816; Incorporated into the Duchy of Nassau	6 April 1825	William

==== Duchess consort of Nassau (1816–1866) ====
Picture	Name	Father	Birth	Marriage	Became Consort	Ceased to be Consort	Death	Spouse
	Princess Louise of Saxe-Hildburghausen	Frederick, Duke of Saxe-Altenburg (Saxe-Hildburghausen)	28 January 1794	24 June 1814	9 January 1816 husband's ascension	6 April 1825		William
	Princess Pauline of Württemberg	Prince Paul of Württemberg (Württemberg)	25 February 1810	23 April 1829		30 August 1839 husband's death	7 July 1856	William
	Grand Duchess Elizabeth Mikhailovna of Russia	Grand Duke Michael Pavlovich of Russia (Holstein-Gottorp-Romanov)	26 May 1826	31 January 1844		28 January 1845		Adolphe
	Princess Adelheid-Marie of Anhalt-Dessau	Prince Frederick Augustus of Anhalt-Dessau (Ascania)	25 December 1833	23 April 1851		20 September 1866 monarchy abolished	24 November 1916	Adolphe

== The Ottonian Line ==
=== Countess of Nassau-Dillenburg ===
Picture	Name	Father	Birth	Marriage	Became Consort	Ceased to be Consort	Death	Spouse
	Landgravine Elisabeth of Hesse-Marburg	Henry III, Landgrave of Upper Hesse (Hesse)	May 1466	11 February 1482	1504 husband's ascension	30 July 1516 husband's death	17 January 1523	Johann V
	Claudia of Châlon	John IV of Chalon-Arlay (Chalon-Arlay)	1498	May 1515	1516 husband's ascension	31 May 1521		Henry III
	Mencía de Mendoza	Rodrigo Díaz de Vivar y Mendoza, 1st Marquis of Cenete (Mendoza)	30 November 1508	26 June 1524		14 September 1538 husband's death	4 January 1554	Henry III
	Countess Juliana of Stolberg-Wernigerode	Bodo VIII, Count of Stolberg-Wernigerode (Stolberg)	15 February 1506	20 September 1531	1538 husband's ascension	6 October 1559 husband's death	18 June 1580	William 'the Rich'
	Countess Elisabeth of Leuchtenberg	George III, Landgrave of Leuchtenberg (Leuchtenberg)	March 1537	6 or 16 June 1559	6 October 1559 husband's ascension	6 July 1579		Johann VI
	Countess Palatine Kunigunde Jakobäa of Simmern	Frederick III, Elector Palatine (Wittelsbach)	9 October 1556	13 September 1580		26 January 1586		Johann VI
	Countess Johannetta of Sayn-Wittgenstein	Louis I, Count of Sayn-Wittgenstein (Sayn-Wittgenstein)	15 February 1561	14 June 1586		8 October 1606 husband's death	13 April 1622	Johann VI
	Countess Amalia of Sayn-Wittgenstein	Louis I, Count of Sayn-Wittgenstein (Sayn-Wittgenstein)	13 October 1585	5 Oct 1605	1620	9 August 1623 husband's death	28 March 1633	George
	Countess Catherine of Sayn-Wittgenstein	Louis I, Count of Sayn-Wittgenstein (Sayn-Wittgenstein)	10 August 1588	25 November 1615	1623 husband's ascension	19 May 1651		Louis Henry
	Wild- and Rhinegravine Elisabeth of Salm-Dhaun	Adolph Henry of Dhaun-Neufviller (House of Salm)	13 March 1593	10 September 1653		13 January 1656		Louis Henry
	Princess Sofie Magdalene of Nassau-Hadamar	John Louis of Nassau-Hadamar (Nassau)	16 February 1622	25 September 1656		28 June 1658		Louis Henry
	Duchess Dorothea Elisabeth of Legnica-Brzeg	George III of Brieg (Piast)	17 December 1646	13 October 1663		9 June 1691		Henry
	Duchess Johanna Dorothea of Schleswig-Holstein-Sonderburg-Plön-Norburg	Augustus, Duke of Schleswig-Holstein-Sonderburg-Plön-Norburg (Oldenburg)	24 December 1676	13 January 1699	18 April 1701 husband's ascension	21 September 1724 husband's death	29 November 1727	William II
	Princess Isabella Charlotte of Nassau-Dietz	Henry Casimir II, Prince of Nassau-Dietz (Nassau)	22 January 1692	1725		28 August 1739 husband's death	18 September 1757	Christian

=== Countess and Princess of Nassau-Hadamar ===
Picture	Name	Father	Birth	Marriage	Became Consort	Ceased to be Consort	Death	Spouse
	Countess Ursula of Lippe	Simon VI, Count of Lippe (Lippe)	25 February 1598	22 August 1617		17 July 1638		John Louis
	Countess Ernestine Charlotte of Nassau-Siegen	John VIII, Count of Nassau-Siegen (Nassau)	23 October 1623	15 February 1650	10 March 1653 husband's ascension	15 August 1668		Maurice Henry
	Countess Maria Leopoldine of Nassau-Siegen	John Francis Desideratus, Prince of Nassau-Siegen (Nassau)	27 September 1652	12 August 1669		27 June 1675		Maurice Henry
	Countess Anna Louise of Manderscheid-Blankenheim	Count Salentin Ernest of Manderscheid-Blankenheim (Manderscheid)	11 April 1654	24 October 1675		24 January 1679 husband's death	23 April 1692	Maurice Henry
	Landgravine Elisabeth of Hesse-Rheinfels-Rotenburg	William I "the Elder" of Hesse-Rotenburg (Hesse)	14 February 1677	18 October 1695		27 May 1711 husband's death	15 May 1739	Francis Alexander

=== Countess of Nassau-Siegen ===
Picture	Name	Father	Birth	Marriage	Became Consort	Ceased to be Consort	Death	Spouse
	Duchess Margaret of Schleswig-Holstein-Sonderburg	John II, Duke of Schleswig-Holstein-Sonderburg (Oldenburg)	24 February 1583	27 August 1603	8 October 1606 husband's ascension; the younger line of Nassau-Siegen was split off from the House of Nassau-Dillenburg on 30 March 1607	27 September 1623 husband's death	10 April 1658	John VII

==== Countess and Princess of Nassau-Siegen (Catholic Branch) ====
Picture	Name	Father	Birth	Marriage	Became Consort	Ceased to be Consort	Death	Spouse
	Princess Ernestine Yolande de Ligne	Lamoral, 1st Prince of Ligne (Ligne)	2 November 1594	13 August 1618	27 September 1623 husband's ascension	27 July 1638 husband's death	4 June 1668	John VIII
	Countess Johanna Klaudia of Königsegg-Aulendorf	Johann Georg of Königsegg-Rotenfels-Aulendorf (Königsegg-Aulendorf)	August 1632	12 November 1651		28 November 1663		John Francis Desideratus
	Margravine Mary Eleonore Sophie of Baden-Baden	Herman, Margrave of Baden-Baden (Baden)	ca. 1640	31 May 1665		19 April 1668		John Francis Desideratus
	Isabella Clara du Puget de la Serre	Nicholas du Puget de La Serre (Puget de la Serre)	1651	9 February 1669		17 December 1699 husband's death	19 October 1714	John Francis Desideratus
	Countess Maria Anna Josepha of Hohenlohe-Waldenburg-Schillingsfürst	Louis Gustav, Count of Hohenlohe-Waldenburg-Schillingsfürst (Hohenlohe)	18 May 1678	22 May 1698	17 December 1699	30 September 1739		William Hyacinth
	Countess Maria Sophia Theresia Hedwigis Eva of Starhemberg	Count Konrad Siegmund of Starhemberg (Starhemberg)	28 October 1722	28 July 1740		18 February 1743 husband's death	12 December 1776	William Hyacinth

==== Countess and Princess of Nassau-Siegen (Protestant Branch) ====
Picture	Name	Father	Birth	Marriage	Became Consort	Ceased to be Consort	Death	Spouse
	Countess Christiane of Erbach	George III of Erbach (Erbach)	5 June 1596	17 January 1619	23 January 1624 husband's ascension	17 July 1642 husband's death	6 July 1646	William
	Princess Ernestine Charlotte of Nassau-Schaumburg	Adolph, Prince of Nassau-Schaumburg (Nassau)	20 May 1662^{Jul.}	6 February 1678^{Jul.}	20 December 1679 husband's ascension	23 January 1691^{Jul.} husband's death	21 February 1732	William Maurice
	Landgravine Elisabeth Juliana Francisca of Hesse-Homburg	Frederick II, Landgrave of Hesse-Homburg (Hesse)	6 January 1681	7 January 1702		12 November 1707		Frederick William Adolf
	Duchess Amalie Louise of Courland	Frederick Casimir, Duke of Courland (Kettler)	23 July 1687	13 April 1708		13 February 1722 husband's death	18 January 1750	Frederick William Adolf
	Countess Sophie Polyxena Concordia of Sayn-Wittgenstein-Hohenstein	Count August David zu Sayn-Wittgenstein-Hohenstein (Sayn-Wittgenstein-Hohenstein)	28 May 1709	23 September 1728		2 March 1734 husband's death	15 December 1781	Frederick William II

=== Countess and Princess of Nassau-Dietz ===
Picture	Name	Father	Birth	Marriage	Became Consort	Ceased to be Consort	Death	Spouse
	Sophia Hedwig of Brunswick-Lüneburg	Henry Julius, Duke of Brunswick-Lüneburg (Welf)	13 June 1592	8 June 1607		2 June 1632 husband's death	13 January 1642	Ernest Casimir I
	Countess Albertine Agnes of Nassau	Frederick Henry, Prince of Orange (Orange-Nassau)	9 April 1634	2 May 1652		31 October 1664 husband's death	26 May 1696	William Frederick
	Princess Henriëtte Amalia of Anhalt-Dessau	John George II, Prince of Anhalt-Dessau (Ascania)	16 August 1666	26 November 1683		25 March 1696 husband's death	18 April 1726	Henry Casimir II
