= Johann Ernst, Count of Nassau-Weilburg =

German count (1664–1719)

Johann Ernst of Nassau-Weilburg
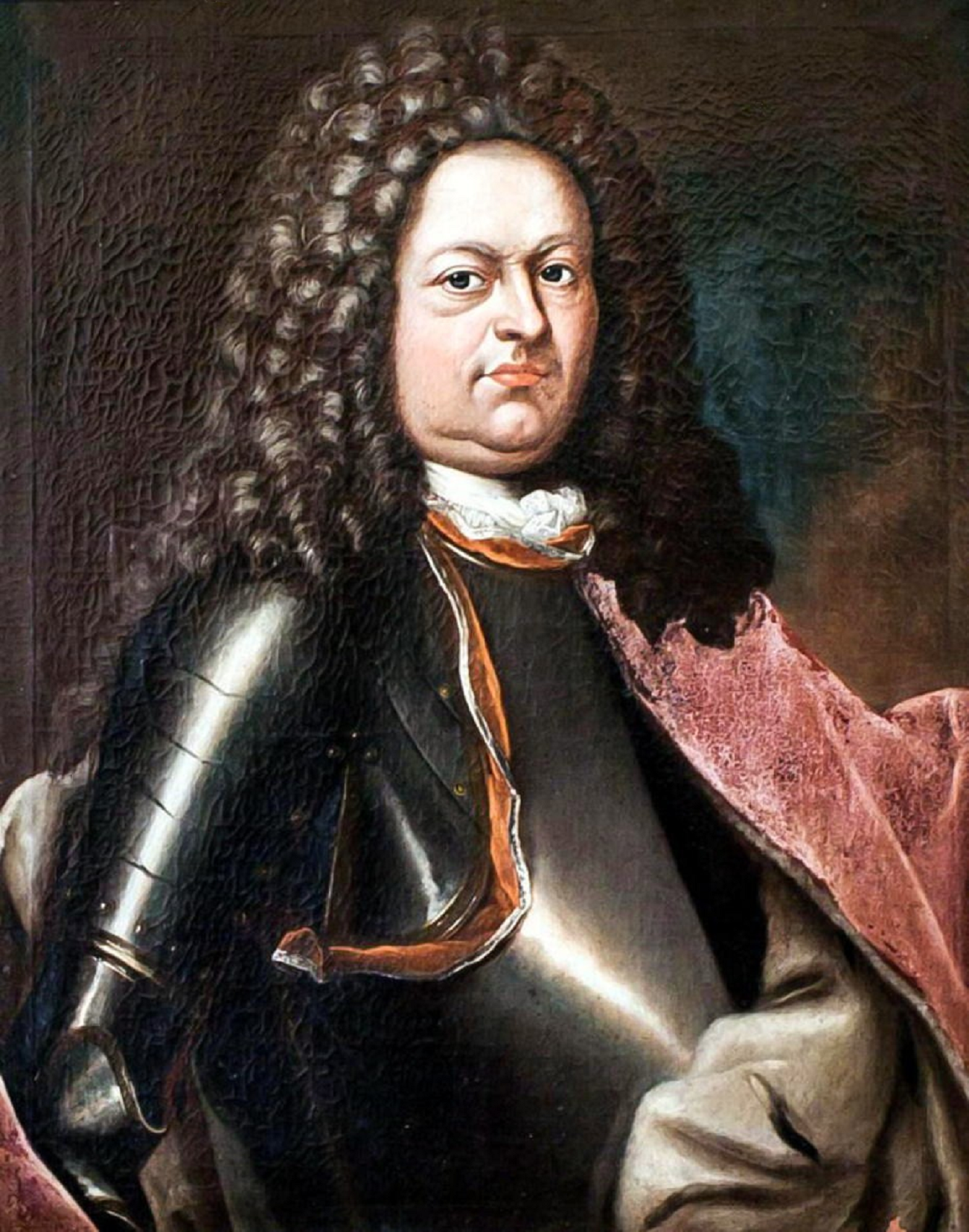
- Portrait c. 1710
- Born: 13 June 1664; Weilburg
- Died: 27 February 1719 (aged 54); Heidelberg
- Noble family: Nassau
- Spouse: Maria Polyxena of Leiningen-Dagsburg-Hartenburg
- Issue: Charles August, Prince of Nassau-Weilburg
- Father: Frederick, Count of Nassau-Weilburg
- Mother: Christiane Elisabeth of Sayn-Wittgenstein

Johann Ernst of Nassau-Weilburg (Weilburg, 13 June 1664 – Heidelberg, 27 February 1719) was an Imperial Generalfeldmarschall, from 1675 to 1688 Count and from 1688 until his death Prince (Fürst) of Nassau-Weiburg.

== Biography ==
Johann Ernst was the eldest son of Frederick, Count of Nassau-Weilburg (1640–1675) and Christiane Elisabeth of Sayn-Wittgenstein (1646–1678). After the death of his parents, his regents were Johann, Count of Nassau-Idstein and after his death, Johann Louis, Count of Nassau-Ottweiler.

In Juli 1679 Johann Ernst started his studies at the University of Tübingen. Between 1681 and 1682 he stayed at the court of King Louis XIV in the Palace of Versailles.

Johann Ernst became the only ruler of Nassau-Weilburg when his brother Frederick William Louis was killed in 1684 during the siege of Buda. His territories on the left bank of the Rhine were occupied by France and only returned after the Treaty of Ryswick in 1697.

Johann Ernst had an important military career. In 1684 he commanded a Dragoon regiment in the service of the Landgraviate of Hesse-Kassel. In 1688, at the start of the Nine Years' War, he defended Koblenz. Later he participated in the Siege of Mainz (1689), the Battle of Fleurus (1690) and the Battle of Landen (1693).

In September 1696 Johann Ernst entered as general in the service of the Electoral Palatinate as General, which enraged his former employer Charles I, Landgrave of Hesse-Kassel. After the Peace of Ryswick, Johann Ernst became governor of the Palatinate city of Düsseldorf.

In 1701, at the outbreak of the War of Spanish Succession, Johann Ernst raised an army, participated in the successful Siege of Landau in 1702 and the consequent chasing of an army under Marshal of France Tallard from the Hunsrück. For this achievement, he was made an Imperial Generalfeldmarschall.

When Prince Eugene of Savoy marched in 1703 to Bavaria against the French Marshal Villars, Johann Ernst stayed on the Rhine to defend Landau against Tallard. This led on November 15, 1703, to the Battle of Speyerbach. It was a terrible defeat. 8000 men were lost and Johann Ernst's eldest son, Colonel Frederick Ludwig of Nassau-Weilburg was killed. Hereafter, Johann Ernst never fought a major engagement again and withdrew from active service all together in 1706. He was Großhofmeister of the Elector Palatinate until 1716 and returned to Weilburg, where he died in 1719.

== Building ==
In the 1700s, Johann Ernst initiated the expansion of his residence, Schloss Weilburg, from a Renaissance Palace to a Baroque complex, adding orangeries, stables, a church and terrace gardens.

== Marriage and issue ==
Johann Ernst married on April 3, 1683, Countess Maria Polyxena of Leiningen-Dagsburg-Hartenburg (February 7, 1662 – April 22, 1725), daughter of Friedrich Emich, Count of Leiningen-Dagsburg-Hartenburg (1621-1698) and Countess Sybille von Waldeck-Wildungen (1619-1678).

They had nine children:

- Frederick Louis (1683–1703), killed in the Battle of Speyerbach
- Charles August (1685–1753) married Princess Auguste Friederike Wilhelmine of Nassau-Idstein (1699-1750)
- Maria Polyxena (1686–1687)
- Johanna Louise (1687–1688)
- Charles Ernst (1689–1709)
- Henry Louis (1690–1691)
- Magdalena Henriette (1691–1725) married Frederick William, 1st Prince of Solms-Braunfels
- Albertina (1693–1748)
- a daughter (1694)

== Ancestors ==
Ancestors of Johann Ernst, Count of Nassau-Weilburg

16. Albert, Count of Nassau-Weilburg
8. Louis II, Count of Nassau-Weilburg
17. Anna of Nassau-Dillenburg
4. Ernest Casimir, Count of Nassau-Weilburg
18. William IV, Landgrave of Hesse-Kassel
9. Anna Maria of Hesse-Kassel
19. Sabine of Württemberg
2. Frederick, Count of Nassau-Weilburg
20. Louis I, Count of Sayn-Wittgenstein
10. William II of Sayn-Wittgenstein-Hachenburg
21. Elisabeth of Solms-Laubach
5. Anna Maria of Sayn-Wittgenstein-Hachenburg
22. Albert, Count of Nassau-Weilburg (= 16)
11. Anna Ottilie of Nassau-Weilburg
23. Anna of Nassau-Dillenburg (=17)
1. John Ernst, Count of Nassau-Weilburg
24. Louis I, Count of Sayn-Wittgenstein (= 20)
12. George II, Count of Sayn-Wittgenstein-Berleburg
25. Anna of Solms-Braunfels
6. Ernest, Count of Sayn-Wittgenstein-Homburg
26. Albert, Count of Nassau-Weilburg (= 16)
13. Elisabeth of Nassau-Weilburg
27. Anna of Nassau-Dillenburg (= 17)
3. Christiane Elisabeth of Sayn-Wittgenstein-Homburg
28. Josias I, Count of Waldeck-Eisenberg
14. Christian, Count of Waldeck-Wildungen
29. Maria of Barby-Mühlingen
7. Christiane of Waldeck-Wildungen
30. John VII, Count of Nassau-Siegen
15. Elisabeth of Nassau-Siegen
31. Magdalene of Waldeck-Wildungen

Johann Ernst, Count of Nassau-Weilburg House of Nassau-Weilburg Cadet branch of the House of Nassau Born: 13 June 13 1664 Died: 27 February 1719
Regnal titles
Preceded by Frederick	Count of Nassau-Weilburg; 1675–1688	Title elevated
New title	Prince of Nassau-Weilburg; 1688–1719	Succeeded by Charles August
