= Charles Augustus, Prince of Nassau-Weilburg =

Prince of Nassau-Weilburg (1719–1753)

Charles August, Prince of Nassau-Weilburg
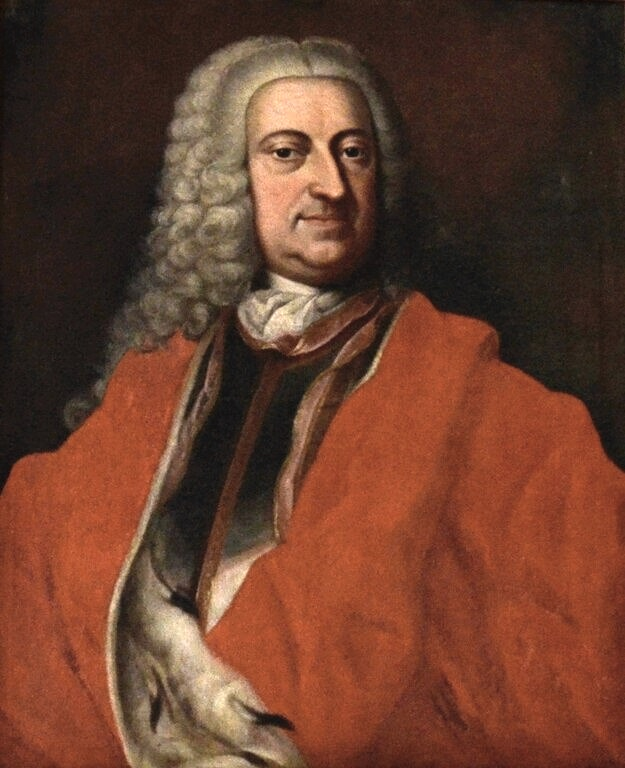
- Portrait of Charles August c. 1710
- Born: 17 September 1685; Weilburg
- Died: 9 November 1753 (aged 68); Weilburg
- Noble family: Nassau
- Spouse: Auguste Friederike of Nassau-Idstein
- Issue: Charles Christian, Prince of Nassau-Weilburg
- Father: John Ernst, Count of Nassau-Weilburg
- Mother: Maria Polyxena of Leiningen-Dagsburg-Hartenburg

Charles August (Karl August, 17 September 1685, Weilburg – 9 November 1753) was from 1719 to 1753 Prince of Nassau-Weilburg.

Charles August was the second son of John Ernst of Nassau-Weilburg and Maria Polyxena of Leiningen-Dagsburg-Hartenburg. In his youth, he worked as a diplomat for Saxony; for a while he was the Saxon ambassador in Paris. He succeeded his father as Prince in Weilburg on 27 February 1719.

In 1733 and 1734, he commanded the imperial troops on the Rhine as an imperial cavalry general.

In 1737 he assumed the title of Prince, which family had been awarded in 1688. In 1688 the family had not, however, obtained a seat on the princely bench in the Imperial Diet, and in protest, they had not used their title. In 1737, the seat in the diet was finally awarded and Charles August started using his princely title.

Charles August died in 1753 and was buried in the chapel of Weilburg. He was succeeded by his son Charles Christian.

== Descendants ==
Charles August married on 17 August 1723 in Wiesbaden, Princess Auguste Friederike of Nassau-Idstein (1699–1750), daughter of George August, Count of Nassau-Idstein. They had the following children:

- Henrietta Maria Dorothea (1724)
- Henrietta Augusta Frederica (1726–1757)
- Christiana Louise (1727)
- Polyxena Louise Wilhelmina (1728–1732)
- Christiana Louise Charlotte (1730–1732)
- Louise Polyxena (born: 27 January 1733; died: 27 September 1764)

married Prince Simon August of Lippe-Detmold

- Charles Christian (1735–1788)

married firstly in 1760 Princess Carolina of Orange-Nassau daughter of William IV, Prince of Orange (1743–1787)
married secondly in 1788 Barbara Giessen of Kirchheim

== Ancestors ==
Ancestors of Charles Augustus, Prince of Nassau-Weilburg

16. Louis II, Count of Nassau-Weilburg
8. Ernest Casimir, Count of Nassau-Weilburg
17. Anna Maria of Hesse-Kassel
4. Frederick, Count of Nassau-Weilburg
18. William II of Sayn-Wittgenstein-Hachenburg
9. Anna Maria of Sayn-Wittgenstein-Hachenburg
19. Anna Ottilie of Nassau-Weilburg
2. John Ernst, Count of Nassau-Weilburg
20. George II, Count of Sayn-Wittgenstein-Berleburg
10. Ernest, Count of Sayn-Wittgenstein-Homburg
21. Elisabeth of Nassau-Weilburg
5. Christiane Elisabeth of Sayn-Wittgenstein
22. Christian, Count of Waldeck-Wildungen (= 14)
11. Christiane of Waldeck-Wildungen
23. Elisabeth of Nassau-Siegen (= 15)
1. Charles August, Prince of Nassau-Weilburg
24. Emich XII, Count of Leiningen-Dagsburg-Hartenburg
12. John Philip II of Leiningen-Dagsburg-Hartenburg
25. Countess Palatine Maria Elisabeth of Zweibrücken-Neuburg
6. Frederick Emich, Count of Leiningen-Dagsburg-Hartenburg
26. Emich XI, Count of Leiningen-Dagsburg-Falkenburg
13. Elisabeth of Leiningen-Dagsburg-Falkenburg
27. Ursula of Fleckenstein
3. Maria Polyxena of Leiningen-Dagsburg-Hartenburg
28. Josias I, Count of Waldeck-Eisenberg
14. Christian, Count of Waldeck-Wildungen
29. Maria of Barby-Mühlingen
7. Sibylla of Waldeck-Wildungen
30. John VII, Count of Nassau-Siegen
15. Elisabeth of Nassau-Siegen
31. Magdalene of Waldeck-Wildungen

Charles Augustus, Prince of Nassau-Weilburg House of Nassau Born: 17 September 1685 Died: 9 November 1753
Preceded by John Ernst	Prince of Nassau-Weilburg; 1719–1753	Succeeded by Charles Christian
