= Charles Christian, Prince of Nassau-Weilburg =

Charles Christian
- Prince of Nassau-Weilburg
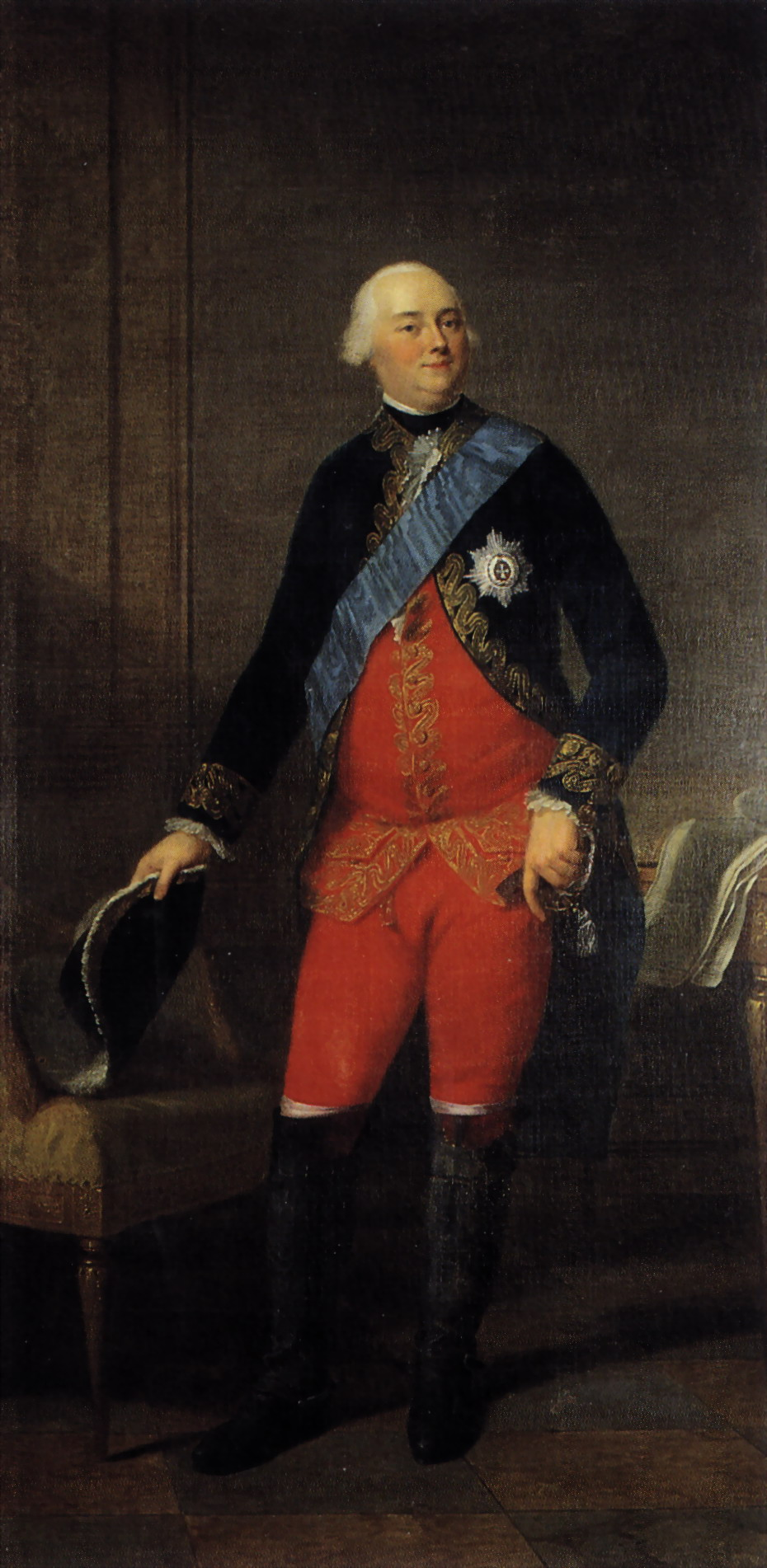
- Portrait c. 1780
- Born: 16 January 1735; Weilburg
- Died: 28 November 1788 (aged 53); Münster-Dreissen, near Kirchheimbolanden
- Spouse: Princess Carolina of Orange-Nassau (m. 1760; died 1787)
- Issue: Georg Wilhelm, Hereditary Prince of Nassau-Weilburg; Wilhelm Ludwig, Hereditary Prince of Nassau-Weilburg; Princess Maria; Wilhelmine Luise, Princess Reuss of Greiz; Frederick William, Prince of Nassau-Weilburg; Caroline, Princess of Wied-Runkel; Prince Karl Ludwig; Prince Karl Wilhelm; Amalie, Princess of Anhalt-Bernburg-Schaumburg-Hoym; Henriette, Duchess Louis of Württemberg; Prince Karl
- House: Nassau-Weilburg
- Father: Charles August, Prince of Nassau-Weilburg
- Mother: Auguste Friederike of Nassau-Idstein

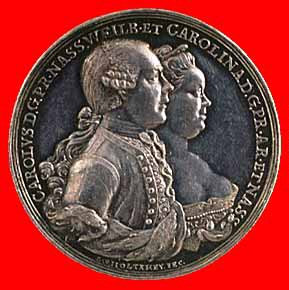
Prince Charles Christian portrayed on a medal with his wife Princess Carolina of Orange-Nassau

Charles Christian, Prince of Nassau-Weilburg (Karl Christian, 16 January 1735 in Weilburg – 28 November 1788 in Münster-Dreissen, near Kirchheim), until 1753 Count of Nassau-Weilburg, was the first ruler of the Principality of Nassau-Weilburg between 1753 and 1788.

== Family and rule ==
He was the son of Charles August, Prince of Nassau-Weilburg and Princess Auguste Friederike of Nassau-Idstein. He succeeded his father in 1753 and united his territories in 1783 with Nassau-Saarbrücken, Nassau-Usingen and Nassau-Dietz.

== Marriage ==
He married on 5 March 1760 in The Hague to Princess Carolina of Orange-Nassau (1743–1787), daughter of William IV, Prince of Orange and Anne, Princess Royal.

He became a general in the Dutch infantry, governor of Bergen op Zoom and governor of Maastricht (1773–1784). He negotiated in vain with the Patriots in 1787.

He died in 1788 and was succeeded by his eldest surviving son Frederick William.

== Children ==
He and Carolina had 15 children, some of whom became ancestors of 19th century royalty:

1. Georg Wilhelm Belgicus, Hereditary Prince of Nassau-Weilburg (The Hague, 18 December 1760 – Honselaarsdijk, 27 May 1762).
2. Wilhelm Ludwig Karl, Hereditary Prince of Nassau-Weilburg (The Hague, 12 December 1761 – Kirchheim, 16 April/26 April 1770).
3. Princess Auguste Marie Karoline of Nassau-Weilburg (The Hague, 5 February 1764 – Weilburg, 25 January 1802). A deaconess in Quedlinburg and Herford.
4. Princess Wilhelmine Luise of Nassau-Weilburg (The Hague, 28 September 1765 – Greiz, 10 October 1837), married in Kirchheim on 9 January 1786 Heinrich XIII, Prince Reuss of Greiz (Greiz, 16 February 1747 – Greiz, 29 January 1817), and had issue.
5. Stillborn son (The Hague, 22 October 1767).
6. Frederick William, Prince of Nassau-Weilburg (25 October 1768, The Hague – 9 January 1816).
7. Princess Karoline Luise Friederike of Nassau-Weilburg (Kirchheim, 14 February 1770 – Wiesbaden, 8 July 1828), married in Kirchheim on 4 September 1787 Karl Ludwig, Prince of Wied-Runkel (Dierdorf, 9 September 1763 – Dierdorf, 9 March 1824), without issue.
8. Prince Karl Ludwig of Nassau-Weilburg (Kirchheim, 19 July 1772 – Kirchheim, 27 July 1772).
9. Prince Karl Friedrich Wilhelm of Nassau-Weilburg (Kirchheim, 1 May 1775 – Weilburg, 11 May 1807), unmarried and without issue.
10. Princess Amelia Charlotte Wilhelmine Luise of Nassau-Weilburg (Kirchheim, 7 August 1776 – Schaumburg, 19 February 1841), married firstly in Weilburg on 29 October 1793 Victor II, Prince of Anhalt-Bernburg-Schaumburg-Hoym, and had issue, and married secondly in Schaumburg on 15 February 1813 Friedrich, Baron von Stein-Liebenstein zu Barchfeld (14 February 1777 – 4 December 1849), and had issue.
11. Stillborn daughter (Kirchheim, 21 October 1778).
12. Child (1779–1779).
13. Princess Henriette of Nassau-Weilburg (22 April 1780 – 2 January 1857). Married Duke Louis of Württemberg, second son of Friedrich II Eugen, Duke of Württemberg.
14. Child (.. November 1784 - died shortly thereafter).
15. Child (.. November 1785 - died shortly thereafter).

== Ancestors ==
Ancestors of Charles Christian, Prince of Nassau-Weilburg

8. Frederick, Count of Nassau-Weilburg
4. John Ernst, Count of Nassau-Weilburg
9. Christiane Elisabeth of Sayn-Wittgenstein-Homburg
2. Charles August, Prince of Nassau-Weilburg
10. Frederick Emich, Count of Leiningen-Dagsburg-Hardenburg
5. Maria Polyxena of Leiningen-Dagsburg-Hartenburg
11. Sibylla of Waldeck-Wildungen
1. Charles Christian, Prince of Nassau-Weilburg
12. John, Count of Nassau-Idstein
6. George August, Count of Nassau-Idstein
13. Anna of Leiningen-Dagsburg-Falkenburg
3. Auguste Friederike of Nassau-Idstein
14. Albert Ernest I of Oettingen-Oettingen
7. Henriette Dorothea of Oettingen-Oettingen
15. Christiane Friederike of Württemberg

Charles Christian, Prince of Nassau-Weilburg House of Nassau-Weilburg Cadet branch of the House of Nassau Born: 16 January 1735 Died: 28 November 1788
Regnal titles
| Preceded by Charles August | Prince of Nassau-Weilburg; 1753–1788 | Succeeded by Frederick William |
