= House of Nassau-Weilburg =

Branch of the House of Nassau

- Parent house: House of Nassau
- Founded: 1344; 682 years ago
- Founder: John I of Nassau-Weilburg
- Current head: Henri, Grand Duke of Luxembourg (in cognatic line)
- Titles: Grand Duke of Luxembourg; Prince of Nassau-Weilburg; Duke of Nassau; Count of Nassau-Weilburg
- Style: His/Her Royal Highness
- Estates: Grand Ducal Palace, Luxembourg City; Berg Castle, Colmar-Berg; Fischbach Castle, Fischbach
- Dissolution: 1985 (in agnatic line after death of Grand Duchess Charlotte)
- Cadet branches: Luxembourg-Nassau; House of Nassau-Usingen (Later Merged with Nassau-Weilbourg

The House of Nassau-Weilburg, a branch of the House of Nassau, ruled a division of the County of Nassau, which was a state in what is now Germany, then part of the Holy Roman Empire, from 1344 to 1806.

On 17 July 1806, upon the dissolution of the Holy Roman Empire, the principalities of Nassau-Usingen and Nassau-Weilburg both joined the Confederation of the Rhine. Under pressure from Napoleon, both principalities merged to become the Duchy of Nassau on 30 August 1806, under the joint rule of Prince Frederick August of Nassau-Usingen and his younger cousin, Prince Frederick William of Nassau-Weilburg. As Frederick August had no heirs, he agreed that Frederick William should become the sole ruler after his death. However, Frederick William died from a fall on the stairs at Schloss Weilburg on 9 January 1816 and it was his son William who later became duke of a unified Nassau.

The sovereigns of this house afterwards governed the Duchy of Nassau until 1866. Since 1890, they have reigned over the Grand Duchy of Luxembourg.

== Religion ==
The first two Grand Dukes of Luxembourg, Adolphe and Guillaume IV, were Protestants, however, the Christian denomination of the house changed after Grand Duke Guillaume IV's marriage to Marie Anne de Braganza, who was Catholic.

== Gallery ==
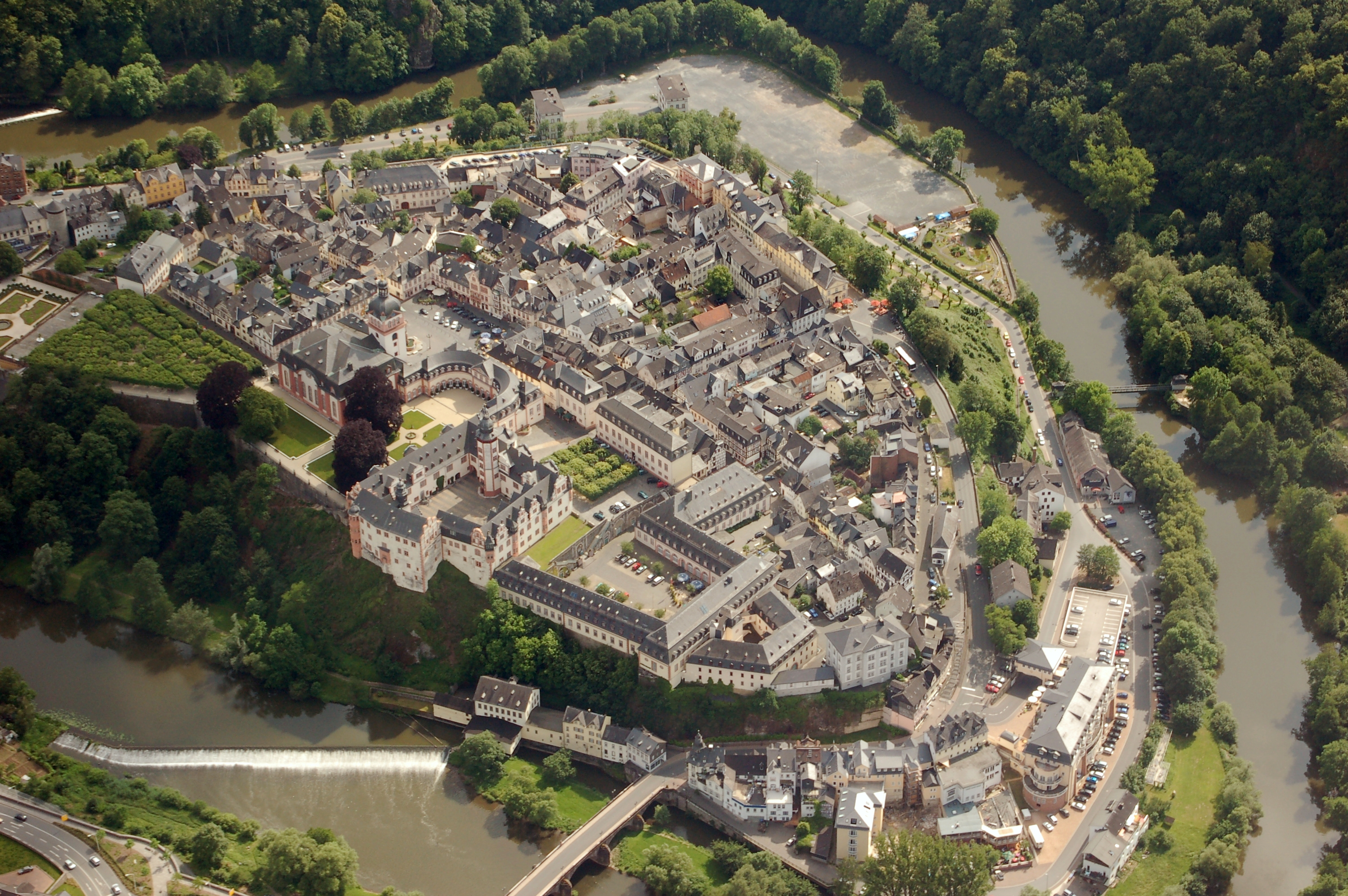
Weilburg

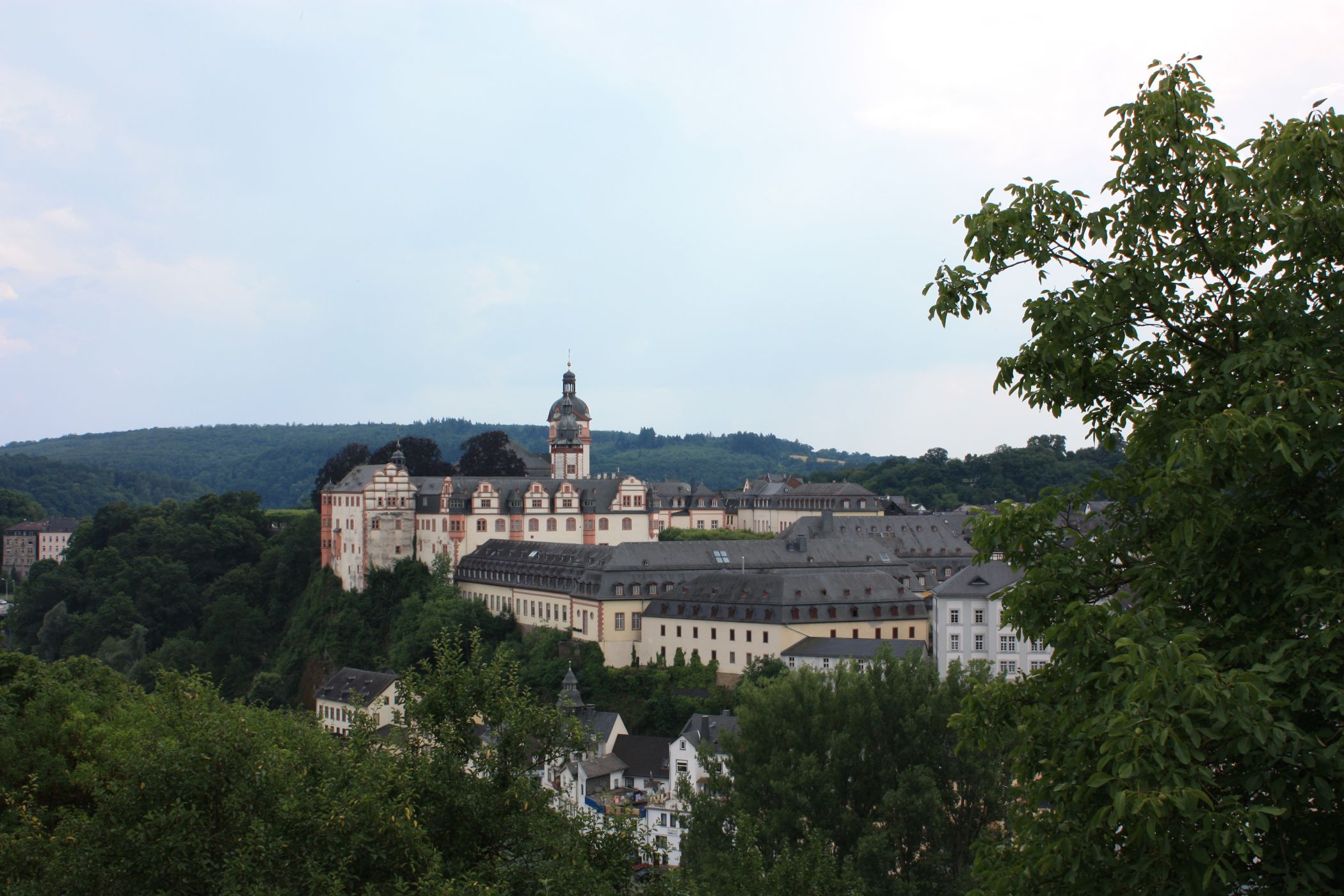
Weilburg Castle

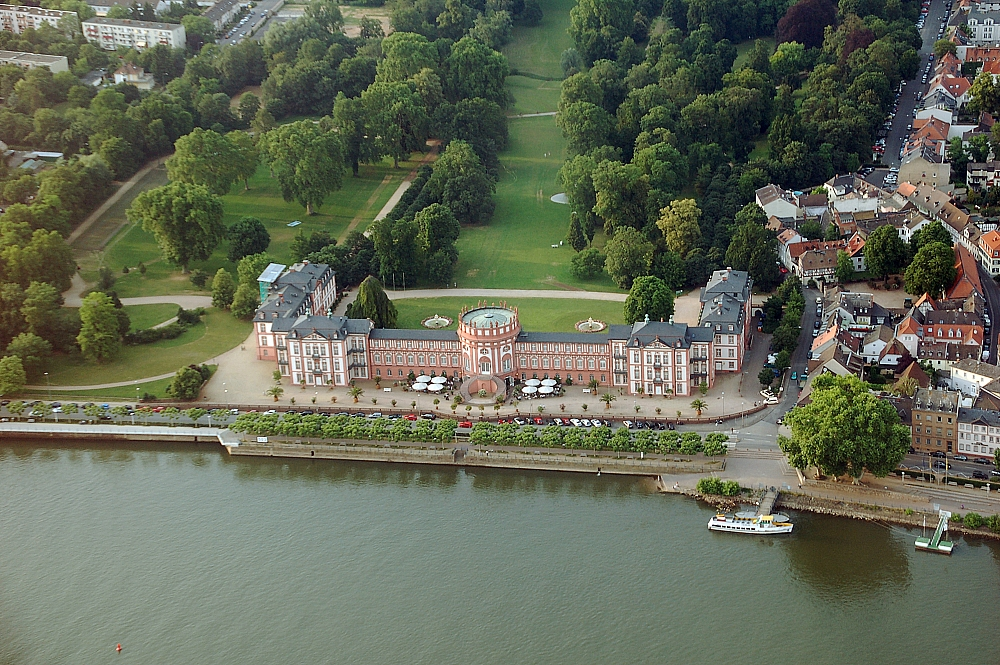
Biebrich Palace

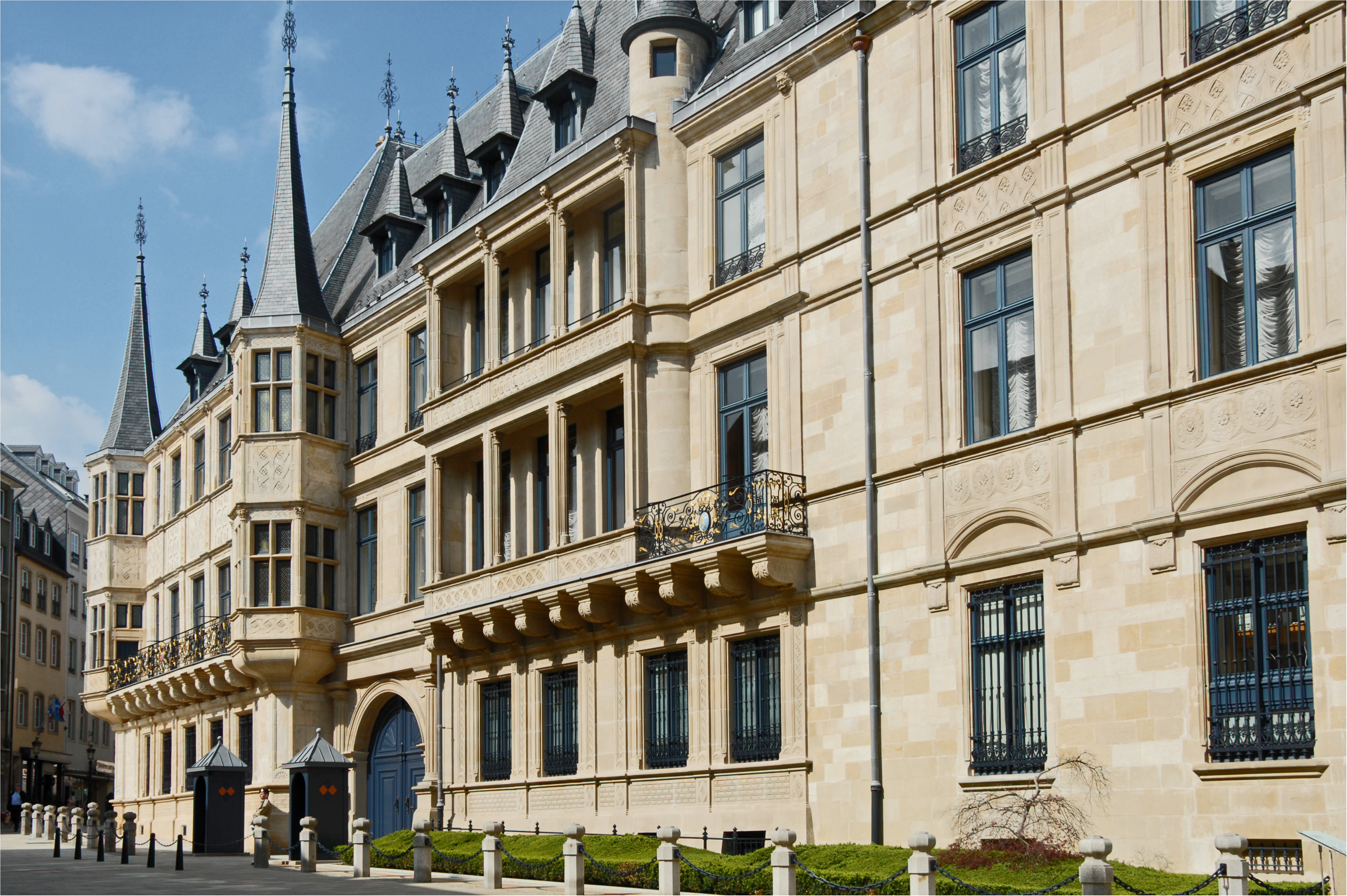
Grand Ducal Palace, Luxembourg

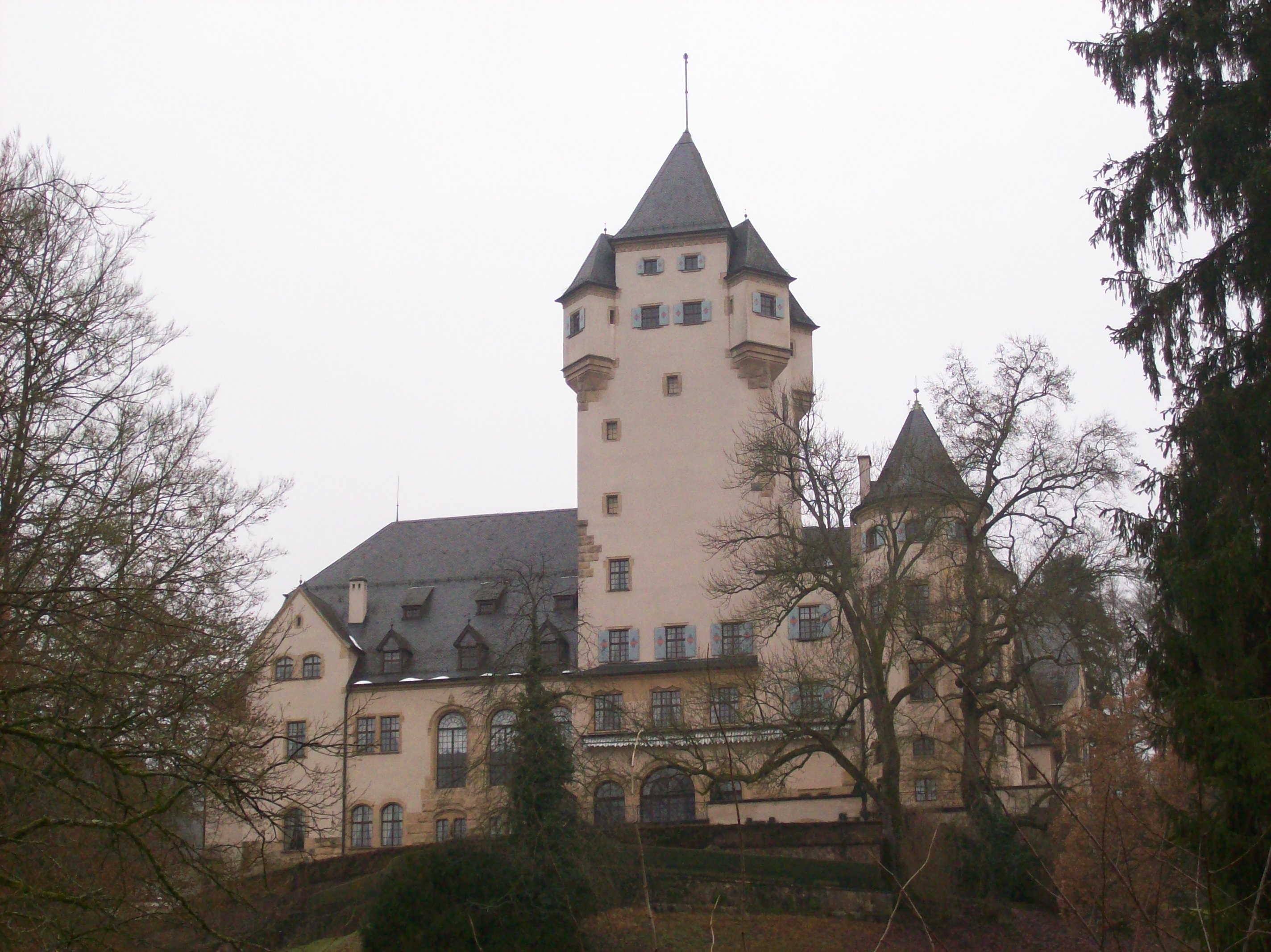
Berg Castle, Luxembourg

== Sovereigns from the House of Nassau-Weilburg ==
=== Nassau ===
==== Counts of Nassau-Weilburg ====
- 1344–71: John I
- 1371–1429: Philip I
- 1429–42: Philip II and John II
- 1442–92: Philip II
- 1492–1523: Louis I
- 1523–59: Philip III
- 1559–93: Albrecht
- 1559–1602: Philip IV
- 1593–1625: Louis II
- 1625–29: William Louis, John IV and Ernst Casimir
- 1629–55: Ernst Casimir
- 1655–75: Frederick
- 1675–88: John Ernst

==== Princely counts of Nassau-Weilburg ====
- 1688–1719: John Ernst
- 1719–53: Charles August
- 1753–88: Charles Christian
- 1788–1816: Frederick William
- 1816: William

==== Dukes of Nassau ====
- 1816–39: William
- 1839–66: Adolphe

=== Grand Dukes of Luxembourg ===
- 1890–1905: Adolphe
- 1905–12: William IV
- 1912–19: Marie-Adélaïde
- 1919–64: Charlotte
- 1964–2000: Jean
- 2000–2025: Henri
- 2025–present: Guillaume V

== Family tree ==
Family tree of the House of Nassau-Weilburg

Compiled from Wikipedia and these references.

For ancestors of the House of Nassau-Weilburg, see House of Nassau#Family Tree

John III (1441–1480); Count of Nassau-Weilburg
Louis I (1473–1523); Count of Nassau-Weilburg
Philip III (1504–1559); Count of Nassau-Weilburg
Albert (1537–1593); Count of Nassau-Weilburg	Philip IV (1542–1602); Count of Nassau-Weilburg in Saarbrucken
Louis II (1565–1627); Count of Nassau-Weilburg in Ottweiler	William (1570–1597); Count of Nassau-Weilburg in Weilburg	John Casimir (1577–1602); Count of Nassau-Weilburg in Gleiberg
William Louis (1590–1640); Count of Nassau-Saarbrücken	John (1603–1677); Count of Nassau-Idstein Counts of Nassau-Idstein ext.1721	Ernest Casimir (1607–1655); Count of Nassau-Weilburg
John Louis (1625–1690); Count of Nassau-Ottweiler ext. 1728	Gustav Adolph (1632–1677); Count of Nassau-Saarbrücken ext. 1723	Walrad (1635–1702); Count & Prince of Nassau-Usingen ext. 1816	Frederick (1640–1675); Count of Nassau-Weilburg
John Ernst (1664–1719); Count & Prince of Nassau-Weilburg
Charles August (1685–1753); Prince of Nassau-Weilburg	Charles Ernst (1689–1709); Prince of Nassau-Weilburg
Princess Carolina of Orange-Nassau (1743–1787)	Charles Christian (1735–1788); Prince of Nassau-Weilburg
Frederick William (1768–1816); Prince of Nassau-Weilburg
William (1792–1839); Duke of Nassau
William (1792–1839); Duke of Nassau
Adolphe (1817–1905) Grand Duke of Luxembourg r. 1890–1905
William IV (1852–1912) Grand Duke of Luxembourg r. 1905–1912
Marie-Adélaïde (1894–1924) Grand Duchess of Luxembourg r. 1912–1919	Charlotte (1896–1985) Grand Duchess of Luxembourg r. 1919–1964
House of Luxembourg-Nassau

— Royal house — House of Nassau-Weilburg
New dynasty partitioned from Cty. of Nassau	Ruling house of Nassau-Weilburg; 1344–1806	Nassau-Weilburg merged in Ducal Nassau ruled by the House of Nassau-Usingen
Preceded by House of Nassau-Usingen	Ruling house of the Duchy of Nassau; 1816–1866	Nassau annexed by Prussia
Preceded by House of Orange-Nassau	Ruling house of Luxembourg; 1890–present	Succeeded by Incumbent
