= Ernest Casimir, Count of Nassau-Weilburg =

German aristocrat

Ernest Casimir of Nassau-Weilburg
- Born: 15 November 1607; Saarbrücken
- Died: 16 April 1655 (aged 47); Weilburg
- Noble family: House of Nassau
- Spouse: Anna Maria of Sayn-Wittgenstein-Hachenburg
- Father: Louis II, Count of Nassau-Weilburg
- Mother: Anna Maria of Hesse-Kassel

Ernest Casimir of Nassau-Weilburg (15 November 1607 – 16 April 1655) was the founder of the younger line of Nassau-Weilburg.

He was the son of Louis II, Count of Nassau-Weilburg, and Anna Maria of Hesse-Kassel (1567–1626).

== Life ==
He was born in Saarbrücken.

His father, Louis II, had been able to unite all the territories of Walram branch of Nassau. After his death in 1627, the territories were divided among four brothers, with William Louis, the oldest, acting as regent for the youngest two. When Otto, the youngest died in 1632, and Ernest Casimir came of age, the three surviving brothers divided the territory anew. The oldest, William Louis, received Nassau-Saarbrücken, John received Idstein and Ernest Casimir received Weilburg, Merenberg, Gleiberg, Hüttenberg, Reichelsheim, Kirchheim, Stauf, Bolanden and parts of Homburg

Ernest Casimir did not spend much time in his own territory. In 1634, he had to flee from the Thirty Years' War. He fled to Metz and returned after the 1648 Peace of Westphalia. Even after the peace had been signed, it took a while before all rightful rulers had been restored to power.

During this period, the brothers concluded the Treaty of Gotha of 16 July 1651, in which division of 1632 was confirmed and again adjusted.

He died in Weilburg.

== Marriage and issue ==
In 1634, Ernest Casimir married Anna Maria of Sayn-Wittgenstein-Hachenburg (1610–1656). She was the daughter of Count William II of Sayn-Wittgenstein-Hachenburg (1569–1623). They had four children:

- William Louis (1634–1636)
- Marie Eleonore (1636–1678), married Count Casimir of Eberstein (d. 1660)
- Casimir (1638–1639)
- Frederick (1640–1675), married Christiane Elisabeth of Sayn-Wittgenstein-Homburg (1646–1678), daughter of Count Ernest of Sayn-Wittgenstein-Homburg (1599–1649)

== Ancestors ==
Ancestors of Ernest Casimir, Count of Nassau-Weilburg

16. Louis I, Count of Nassau-Weilburg
8. Philip III, Count of Nassau-Weilburg
17. Marie Margaret of Nassau-Wiesbaden
4. Albert, Count of Nassau-Weilburg
18. Albert VII of Mansfeld-Hinterort
9. Anna of Mansfeld-Hinterort
19. Anna of Honstein-Klettenberg
2. Louis II, Count of Nassau-Weilburg
20. John V, Count of Nassau-Siegen
10. William I, Count of Nassau-Siegen
21. Elisabeth of Hesse-Marburg
5. Anna of Nassau-Dillenburg
22. Bodo III, Count of Stolberg-Wernigerode
11. Juliana of Stolberg
23. Anna of Eppstein-Königstein
1. Ernest Casimir, Count of Nassau-Weilburg
24. William II, Landgrave of Hesse
12. Philip I, Landgrave of Hesse
25. Anna of Mecklenburg-Schwerin
6. William IV, Landgrave of Hesse-Kassel
26. George, Duke of Saxony
13. Christine of Saxony
27. Barbara Jagiellon
3. Anna Maria of Hesse-Kassel
28. Ulrich, Duke of Württemberg
14. Christopher, Duke of Württemberg
29. Sabina of Bavaria
7. Sabine of Württemberg
30. George, Margrave of Brandenburg-Ansbach
15. Anna Maria of Brandenburg-Ansbach
31. Hedwig of Münsterberg-Oels

== Footnotes ==
Ernest Casimir, Count of Nassau-Weilburg House of Nassau Born: 15 November 1607 Died: April 1655
| Preceded by Louis II | Count of Nassau-Weilburg | Succeeded by Frederick |
