= Battle of Speyerbach =

1703 battle

- Part of the War of the Spanish Succession
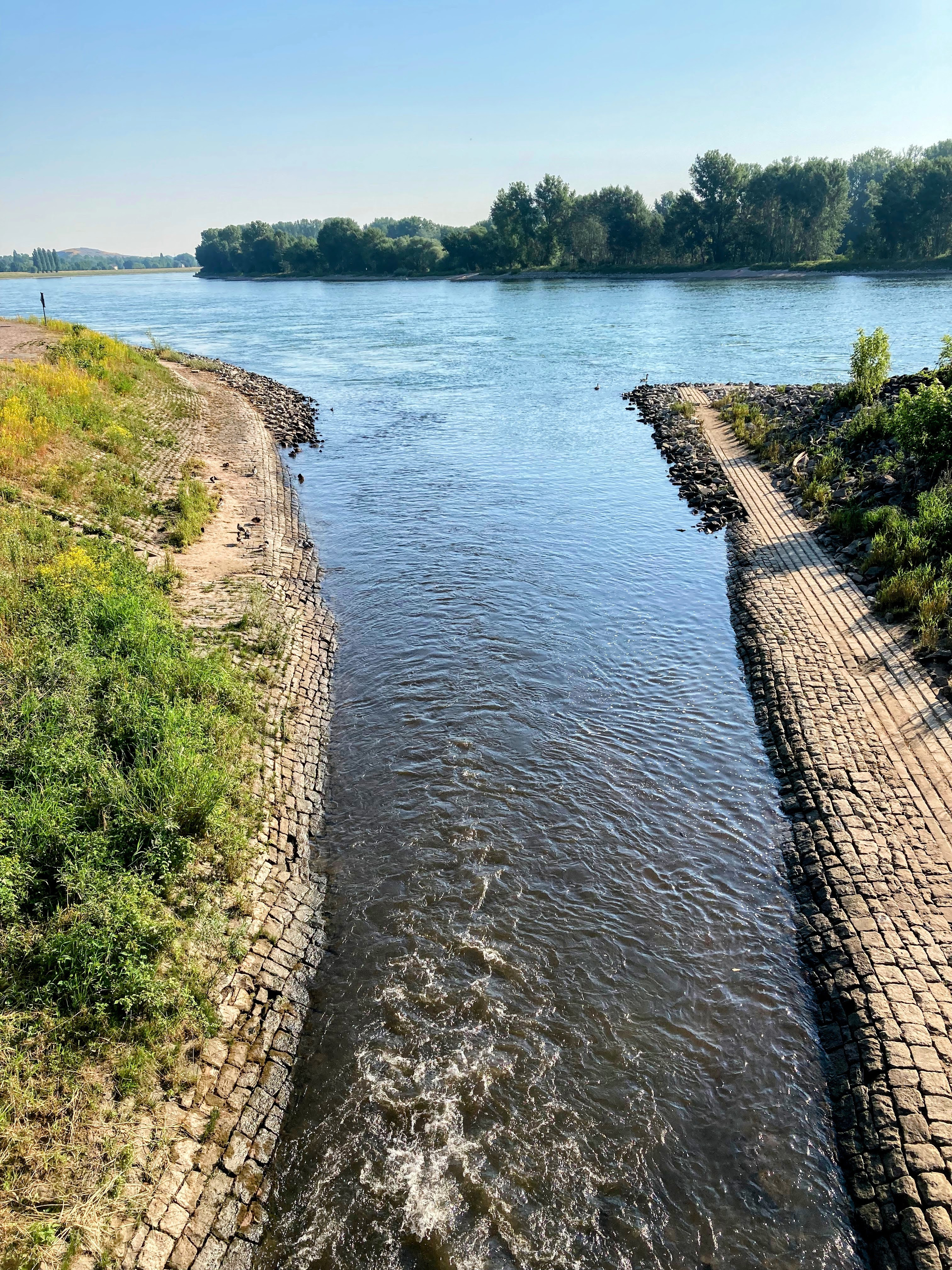
- The Speyerbach river, entering the Rhine near Speyer
| Date | 15 November 1703 |
| Location | Outside Speyer, Rhineland-Palatinate, Germany |
| Result | French victory |

Belligerents
| Holy Roman Empire; Dutch Republic; England; Electoral Palatinate; Hesse-Kassel | Kingdom of France |

Commanders and leaders
| Frederick of Hesse; Nassau-Weilburg; Otto von Vehlen | (Kingdom of France) Camille de Tallard (Kingdom of France) de Pracomtal † |

Strength
| c. 22,000 (Note: 28 battalions infantry, 54 cavalry squadrons) | c. 18,000 (Note: 28 battalions infantry, 72–90 cavalry squadrons) |

Casualties and losses
| 4,500 killed or wounded, 4,000 captured | 4,000 killed or wounded |

The Battle of Speyerbach took place on 15 November 1703 during the War of the Spanish Succession, near Speyer in the Rhineland-Palatinate. A French army commanded by Camille de Tallard defeated an Allied force under Frederick of Hesse.

With the 1703 campaign season nearing its end, in October Tallard besieged Landau, then held by an Imperial garrison. On 13 November, Frederick of Hesse linked up with a smaller force near Speyer led by Johann Ernst, Count of Nassau-Weilburg, and the two agreed to march to its relief. Rather than waiting, on 15 November Tallard launched a surprise attack, inflicting heavy losses on his opponents.

== Background ==
In September 1702, an Imperial army captured Landau, (Note: Now in Germany, the town was part of France from 1680 to 1815) threatening Alsace. Camille de Tallard, French commander on the Upper Rhine, spent much of 1703 unsuccessfully trying to break through the Lines of Stollhofen on the right bank of the Rhine. In late August, Tallard changed focus to the left bank and captured Breisach in early September, then besieged Landau on 11 October 1703. Occupying these two towns would secure the route linking French depots in Alsace with their troops in Bavaria.

At this point, the only Allied forces in the area were 4,000 men from the Electoral Palatinate under John Ernst of Nassau-Weilburg. However, in preparation for the 1704 campaign, Marlborough, the Allied commander, had assigned 18,000 German and Dutch troops under Frederick of Hesse to retake Trier and Traben-Trarbach on the Moselle. The latter agreed to relieve Landau instead, and on 13 November linked up with Nassau-Weilburg on the Rhine near Speyer.

The two commanders decided to await additional reinforcements before marching for Landau on 16 November. In the meantime, Frederick's corps camped around Speyer, with Nassau-Weilburg's men in villages 4 kilometres (2 mi) further west along the Speyerbach. The dispersion later slowed their response to the initial French attack, while Frederick and Nassau-Weilburg argued over who should be in charge, and the latter only yielded after a direct order from Marlborough. Lack of a unified command structure meant the two segments of the Allied force effectively fought as separate units during the subsequent battle.

Rather than waiting, Tallard decided to attack the forces around Speyer before they could be reinforced. 8,000 men under Armand de Pracomtal were based in Arlon, 220 kilometres (137 mi) to the north east, guarding his Line of communication. Aware the Allied relief force was on its way, in early November Tallard ordered him to march on Landau as soon as possible. Heavy rain meant by 10 November the latter was still 100 kilometres (62 mi) away at Saarbrücken, and on 14th, Tallard decided he could delay no longer. Leaving 6,000 men outside Landau, the rest of his army reached Essingen late that night, while Pracomtal abandoned his slow moving infantry, and continued with his cavalry. He joined Tallard at 4:00 am on 15 November, bringing the total French force up to 18,000 men.

Although their scouts encountered French cavalry outside Essingen on 14 November, Frederick and Nassau-Weilburg assumed Tallard's main force was still at Landau, and Pracomtal too far away to affect their operations. This meant they were not expecting an attack, while on the morning of 15 November both commanders were in Speyer, attending ceremonies for Emperor Leopold's Name day.

== Battle ==
Speyerbach campaign; key locations, modern Rhineland-Palatinate in dark green

Shortly after daybreak, Tallard's army began marching the 22 kilometres (14 mi) to Speyer, his cavalry on either wing, infantry and artillery in the centre. Although their movement was reported by Imperial scouts, surprise and the absence of Frederick and Nassau-Weilburg caused confusion, and delayed the issuing of orders. Eventually, Otto von Vehlen took charge of the process, forming the Allied army on level ground 7 kilometres (4 mi) outside Speyer. Their left wing, composed of Nassau-Weilburg's troops, was anchored on the Rhine, with Frederick's men holding positions running from the centre into woods bordering the Speyerbach on their extreme right.

Around 13:00, the French arrived on the battlefield and began deploying, with their opponents still moving into position. Seeing this, de Vaillac, commander of the French right, ordered 14 of his cavalry squadrons to attack the Imperial left. They were repulsed by Palatine infantry with heavy loss, but a counter-attack by their cavalry under Nassau-Weilburg pursued the French too far, and was in turn thrown back in confusion. Meanwhile, Frederick was taking time organising his own corps and waiting for the artillery to come up, apparently unaware of the precarious situation developing on his left. (Note: It has been suggested Frederick may have felt any help would arrive too late) The delay allowed Tallard to finish his deployment undisturbed, and at 14:00 he ordered a general attack.

With Nassau-Weilburg's troops crumbling under pressure from French infantry, a gap developed between the Allied left and centre, exposing both to attacks from two sides. By 15:00, the entire Allied left had disintegrated. Nassau-Weilburg's eldest son Colonel Frederick Ludwig was killed, two battalions were taken prisoner, and the remnants withdrew to Mannheim. On the Allied right, several French attacks were repulsed, with Pracomtal among the dead, but by 16:00 it too was beginning to give way. The French infantry over-ran and captured the Imperial artillery, while their own now opened fire at close range, inflicting heavy casualties. With darkness falling, Frederick ordered his troops to retreat over the Speyerbach, leaving the French in possession of the field.

== Aftermath ==
With the French forces too exhausted to pursue, Frederick of Hesse managed to withdraw in good order to Mainz. However, the Allies lost all their guns and most of the baggage, along with between 4,000 and 4,500 killed or wounded, and 2,000 to 4,000 taken prisoner. French sources place their own losses as less than 800, although others suggest closer to 4,000.

Regardless, it was a significant victory that ensured the security of both Alsace and Lorraine. Landau surrendered two days later, (Note: The Allies recaptured Landau in November 1704, before it was restored to France in 1713) with the French army taking up winter quarters in Trier.

== Sources ==
- Bodart, Gaston (1908). Militär-historisches Kriegs-Lexikon (1618-1905).
- Clodfelter, M. (2002). Warfare and Armed Conflicts: A Statistical Encyclopedia of Casualty and Other Figures, 1492–2015. McFarland. ISBN 978-0-7864-7470-7.
- Falkner, James (2016). War of Spanish Succession 1701-1714. Pen and Sword Military. ISBN 978-1781590317.
- Holmes, Richard (2008). Marlborough; England's Fragile Genius. Harper Press. ISBN 978-0007225712.
- Kennel, Albert (1895). Die Schlacht bei Speier am 15. November 1703 (PhD) (in German). Gymnasium Speier.
- Lynn, John A. (1999). The Wars of Louis XIV 1667-1714. Longman. ISBN 978-0-582-05629-9.
- Périni, Hardÿ de (1896). Batailles françaises; Volume VI (in French). Ernest Flammarion.
- Wijn, J.W. (1956). Het Staatsche Leger: Deel VIII-1 Het tijdperk van de Spaanse Successieoorlog 1702–1705 (The Dutch States Army: Part VIII-1 The era of the War of the Spanish Succession 1702–1705) (in Dutch). Martinus Nijhoff.
