= Anna Maria of Hesse-Kassel =

- Born: 27 January 1567; Kassel
- Died: 21 November 1626 (aged 59); Neunkirchen
- Buried: Saarbrücken
- Spouse(s): Louis II, Count of Nassau-Weilburg
- Father: William IV, Landgrave of Hesse-Kassel
- Mother: Sabine of Württemberg

Anna Maria of Hesse-Kassel (27 January 1567, Kassel – 21 November 1626, Neunkirchen) was a princess of Hesse-Kassel by birth and by marriage Countess of Nassau-Saarbrücken.

== Life ==
Anna Maria was the eldest daughter of Landgrave William IV of Hesse-Kassel (1532–1592) from his marriage to Sabine (1549–1581), daughter of Duke Christopher of Württemberg.

She married on 8 June 1589 in Kassel Count Louis II of Nassau-Weilburg (1565–1627). He had met Anna Maria during his Grand Tour and had been well received by Anna Maria's father and her uncle Louis IV. In 1590 the couple moved in with Louis's father, Albert in Ottweiler. In 1593 Louis took over the government in Nassau-Weilburg.

Anna Maria helped organize the poor relief and set up a court pharmacy.

In 1626 Anna Maria fled from the plague from Saarbrücken to Neunkirchen where she died of the plague. Anna Maria was buried in the crypt of the collegiate church of St. Arnual in Saarbrücken. A few years earlier, she had built an impressive tomb for three of her children and now she was buried in this tomb herself.

== Offspring ==
From her marriage with Louis, Anna Maria had the following children:

- William Louis (1590–1640), Count of Nassau-Saarbrücken

married in 1615 princess Anna Amalia of Baden-Durlach (1595-1651)

- Anna Sabine (1591–1593)
- Albrecht (1593–1595)
- Sophie Amalie (1594–1612)
- Georg Adolf (1595–1596)
- Philipp (1597–1621)
- Luise Juliane (1598–1622)
- Moritz (1599–1601)
- Karl Ernst (1600–1604)
- Marie Elisabeth (1602–1626)

married in 1624 Count Frederick X of Leiningen-Dagsburg (1593-1651)

- John (1603–1677), Count of Nassau-Idstein

married firstly in 1644 Princess Magdalene Sibylle of Baden-Durlach (1605-1644)
married secondly in 1646 Countess Anna of Leiningen (1625-1668)

- Dorothea (1605–1620)
- Ernest Casimir (1607–1655), Count of Nassau-Weilburg

married in 1634 Countess Anna Maria of Sayn-Wittgenstein (1610-1656)

- Otto (1610–1632), Count of Nassau-Weilburg in Neuweilnau
