= Philip IV of Nassau-Weilburg =

Philip IV, Count of Nassau-Weilburg
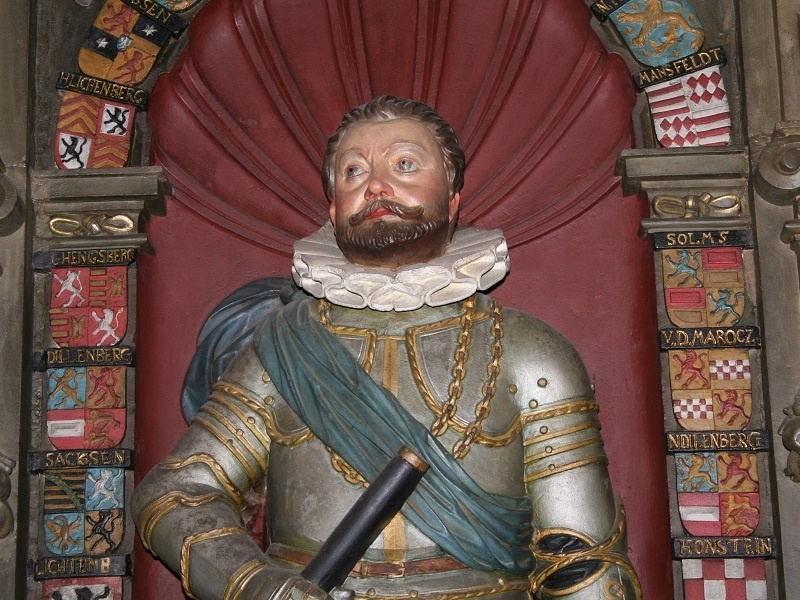
- Born: 14 October 1542; Weilburg
- Died: 12 March 1602 (aged 59); Saarbrücken
- Buried: Collegiate Church in St. Arnual (now part of Saarbrücken)
- Noble family: House of Nassau
- Spouses: Erika of Manderscheid-Blankenheim; Elisabeth of Nassau-Dillenburg
- Father: Philip III, Count of Nassau-Weilburg
- Mother: Amalie of Isenburg-Büdingen

Philip IV of Nassau-Weilburg, also known as Philip III of Nassau-Saarbrücken (14 October 1542 in Weilburg – 12 March 1602 in Saarbrücken) was Count of Nassau-Weilburg from 1559 until his death and since 1574 also Count of Nassau-Saarbrücken. Both possessions belonged to the Walram line of the House of Nassau. In Weilburg, he was the fourth count named Philip, but only the third in Saarbrücken, because his father, Philip III of Nassau-Weilburg never held Nassau-Saarbrücken.

== Life ==
Philip IV was the son of Philip III of Nassau-Weilburg and his third wife Amalie of Isenburg-Büdingen.

Philip IV and his older half-brother Albert of Nassau-Weilburg were educated in the Protestant faith by Kasper Goltwurm at Neuweilburg Castle. Philip later studied at the University of Jena, where he was rector for a while.

On 4 October 1559 his father died. Philip and Albert inherited the County of Nassau-Weilburg. As Philip was only sixteen years old, John III of Nassau-Saarbrücken, the senior member of the Walram line of the House of Nassau took up the guardianship. Initially, the brothers Albert and Philip ruled together. However, the huge debt they had inherited from their father curtailed their ability to act. Nevertheless, they managed to slowly improve their fiscal situation.

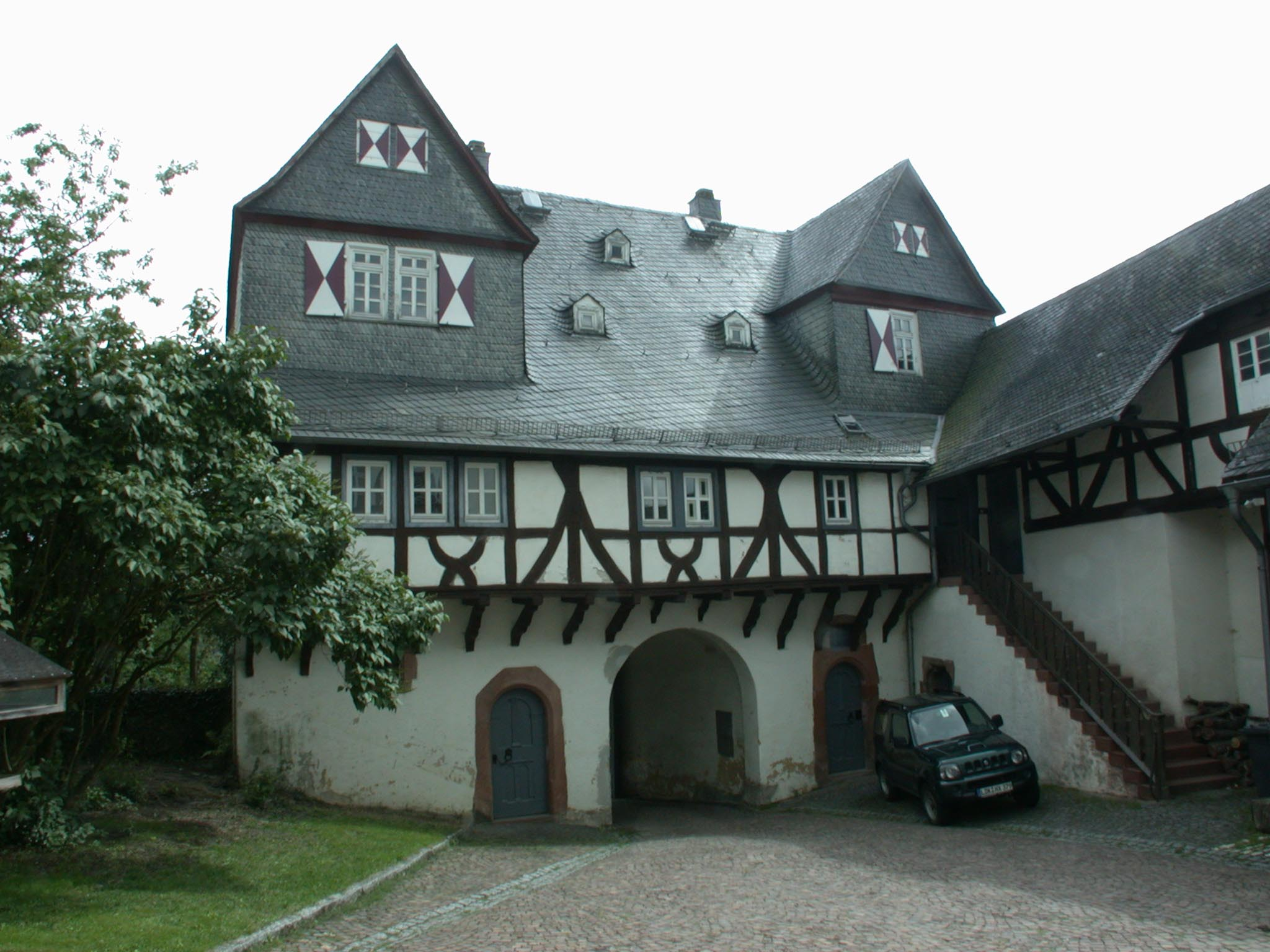
The gatehouse of Neuweilnau Castle was built during Philip's reign

On 15 May 1561, the brothers split their inheritance for the first time. Albert received the castle and district of Weilburg, while Philip received Castle and district of Neuweilnau. The largest part of their territory and the father's the debt, however, remained common property. Philip moved into Neuweilnau Castle, which had already served his father as a residence. Between 1564 and 1566, he significantly expanded the castle.

Philip belonged to the Wetterau Association of Imperial Counts, in which Albert took a leading role. In 1567 and 1568, Philip met with William the Silent several times. He participated in the preparation of the Dutch War of Independence against Fernando Álvarez de Toledo, 3rd Duke of Alba. However, the attack on the Netherlands in 1568, failed.

In 1570 John III of Nassau-Saarbrücken wrote a last will and testament, appointing the half-brothers Albert and Philip as his heirs. John had no male offspring and wanted to ensure that the counties of Saarbrücken, Saarland and Ottweiler were preserved by the Walram line of the House of Nassau in accordance with the inheritance treaty of 1491. As early as 1571 Philip took over the regency over parts of John's estate. He moved his residence from Neuweilnau to Saarbrücken. In the same year Albert and Philip divided the part of the county in Weilburg they had shared earlier. They also closed several treaties with the Landgraviate of Hesse, dividing territories shared by Nassau and Hesse.

Just one year later, in 1572, Philip managed to secularize the St. Mary Abbey in Rosenthal. The Nassau family had a close relationship with the abbey. Their ancestor Adolf of Nassau, the only member of the family to be elected King of Germany, had been temporarily buried there.

In 1572, Philip had Wanborn Castle, a 12th-century structure in the vicinity of Saarbrücken, torn down and a Renaissance style hunting lodge with four wings named Philippsborn constructed on the spot. This lodge was destroyed during the Thirty Years' War; only a vaulted cellar remains. The hunting castle Forsthaus Neuhaus was later built there; the remains of this castle now form the center of a nature preserve.

John III died in 1574 and the Catholic counties of Saarbrücken, Saarland and Ottweiler fell to Albert and Philip of the Weilburg branch of the House of Nassau. They divided this inheritance: Philip received Saarbrüchen, Saarwerden and the Lordship of Stauf; Albert received Ottweiler, the districts of Homburg and Kirchheim and the Lordships of Lahr and Mahlberg in the Black Forest.

Their inheritance of Saarbrücken was challenged from various quarters. Duke Charles III of Lorraine, demanded the county Saarwerden back as a completed fief. However, Albert as the Senior member of the Walram line of Nassau, managed to let Nassau law prevail before the Supreme Court of Appeal. The dispute went on for years and threatened several times to escalate to a militarily level. This was the main reason that Philip moved his main residence to Saarbrücken. His newly built "summer house at Saarbrücken", which forms the basis of today's Saarbrücken Castle, served as his residence.

The Elector Palatine, Frederick III also claimed parts of the inheritance. Here too, the House of Nassau managed to prevail on the essential points. Several large treaties were closed, in which the exact rights and boundaries of the Nassau and Palatinate territories were defined.

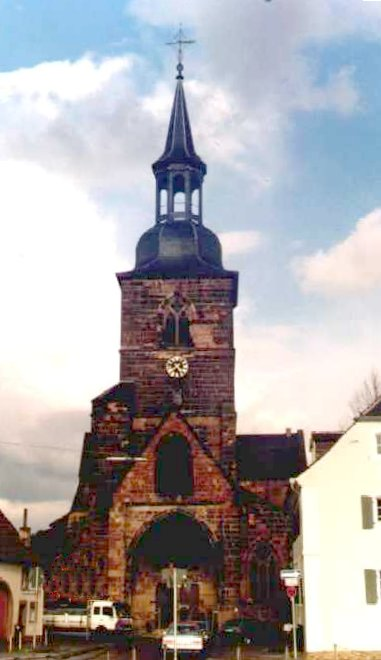
Evangelical Church of St. Arnual

On the first of January 1575 Philip introduced the Reformation in his territories, after the example of Hesse. The court chaplain at Saarbrücken, Gebhart Beilstein from Wetzlar, was tasked with the implementation. Catholic priests were converted to the new faith or removed from office; church property was confiscated; schools were established and patronage was acquired. The celebration of "pagan" feasts, such as St. John's Eve, and dancing on Sundays, were prohibited by law. Philip issued an extensive Church Order. His implementation of the Reformation intensified his disputes with the Duchy of Lorraine, which was still Catholic.

Philip III. died on 12 March 1602 in Saarbrücken. He was buried in the traditional crypt of the house of Nassau-Saarbrücken, in the Collegiate Church (now the Evangelical Church) in St. Arnual (now part of Saarbrücken). As Philip had no sons, his territories were inherited by his nephew Louis II of Nassau-Weilburg, who then held all the territories of the Walram line of Nassau.

== Marriages and issue ==
Philip married his first wife Erika of Manderscheid-Blankenheim on 9 April 1563. They had only child:

- Anna-Amalia of Nassau-Saarbrücken (1565–1605), who later married George of Nassau-Dillenburg.

After the Erika's death in 1581, Philip married on 3 October 1583 Elisabeth of Nassau-Dillenburg, a daughter of John VI "the elder" of Dillenburg. After Philip's death, Elizabeth married Ernest Wolfgang of Isenburg-Büdingen.

Philip IV of Nassau-Weilburg House of Nassau Born: 14 October 1542 Died: 12 March 1602
Preceded by Philip III	Count of Nassau-Weilburg; 1559–1602	Succeeded by Louis II
Preceded by John III	Count of Nassau-Saarbrücken; 1574–1602	Succeeded by Louis II
