= Philip III of Nassau-Weilburg =

Count of Nassau-Weilburg (1523–1559)

Philip III, Count of Nassau-Weilburg
- Born: 20 September 1504; Neuweilnau Castle, Weilrod
- Died: 4 October 1559 (aged 55); Weilburg
- Noble family: House of Nassau
- Spouses: Elisabeth of Sayn-Hachenburg; Anne of Mansfield; Amalie of Isenburg-Büdingen
- Father: Louis I, Count of Nassau-Weilburg
- Mother: Marie Margaret of Nassau-Wiesbaden

Philip III, Count of Nassau-Weilburg (20 September 1504 at Neuweilnau Castle in Weilrod – 4 October 1559 in Weilburg) was a Count of the Nassau-Weilburg. Among his major achievements were the introduction of the Reformation, the foundation of the Gymnasium Philippinum in Weilburg and the start of the construction of Schloss Weilburg.

== Life ==
Philip was the son of Louis I of Nassau-Weilburg (1473–1523). After his father's death, he took over the business of government at the age of 19 years.

During Philip's reign, the Nassau-Weilburg part of the County of Nassau consisted of the districts of Weilburg, Merenberg, Usingen, Sonnenberg and Gleiberg. Important towns were Kirberg, Weilmünster and Neuweilnau. Moreover, he held shares in jointly owned territories. Co-owners of those territories included the Counts of Nassau-Saarbrücken and Nassau-Wiesbaden and the Landgrave of Hesse.

The Reformation began during Philip's time in office. Philip promoted the Reformation in his territory, and to this end, he joined forces with Landgrave Philip I of Hesse. On the other hand, he made sure he would not become a vassal of Hesse. He therefore emphasized his position as an immediate count and was active in the Wetterau Association of imperial counts.

Philip died in 1559 in Weilburg, at the age of 55. He was buried in the chapel of Weilburg Castle. He left a heavily indebted county. His goals had exceeded his financial possibilities. His sons Albert and Philip IV ruled Nassau-Weilburg jointly until 1561, and then divided their inheritance, with Albert receiving Weilburg and Philip IV receiving Neuweilnau.

=== Foreign Policy ===
Because his father had left a huge debt, John Louis of Nassau-Saarbrücken was appointed as Philip's guardian and regent of Nassau-Weilburg. Philip took up government himself in 1524. He began by dividing the Lordships of Stauf, Eisenberg and Kirchheim; these were jointly owned by Nassau-Weilburg and Nassau-Saarbrücken. He also renewed the inheritance treaty between Nassau-Weilburg and Nassau-Saarbrücken in 1524. With the progress of the Reformation, the two counts drifted apart and Philip sought support in the Wetterau Association of Imperial Counts.

During the Diet at Regensburg in 1532, Philip of Nassau-Weilburg and his cousin Philip of Nassau-Wiesbaden promised Emperor Charles V 16 knights and 80 foot soldiers, for the ongoing war against the Ottoman Empire. In return, Nassau-Weilburg received market rights for Rückershausen and Usingen.

After the Wetterau Association of Imperial Counts had been dissolved in 1535, Philip approached Landgrave Philip of Hesse. On 25 January 1536, Philip and Philip concluded a comprehensive territory exchange agreement. Nassau-Weilburg transferred the tax revenue of the imperial free city of Wetzlar, the sovereignty over Kalsmunt Castle, the imperial bailiwick of Wetzlar and the dominion over Altenberg Abbey to Hesse. In exchange, he received the castle and city of Katzenelnbogen, the district and castle of Löhnberg and the right to redeem the Hessian share in the castle and district of Hadamar.

On the recommendation of Philip I of Hesse, Philip III formally joined the Schmalkaldic League on 26 August 1537. However, he only supported the League reluctantly. In particular, he did not pay the special contribution that the League had agreed to. His argument was that he had not received a copy of the League's charter.

After Philip I married bigamously in 1540 and the League failed to support him against Trier, Philip III distanced himself from the Schmalkaldic League, without officially terminating his membership. He remained, however, in close contact with Philip I of Hesse.

During the Schmalkaldic War, Philip III supported Philip I with eight knights. After the initial successes of the imperial troops on the Danube, he recalled this support. The imperial field marshal Reinhard of Solms then mediated a reconciliation between Philip III and Emperor Charles V.

After he had ceased his support for the Schmalkaldic League, Philip III worked to recreate the Wetterau Association. The Association was re-established in 1542 and 1549, he was elected chairman of the Association.

=== Mining policy ===
To improve his financial situation, Philip tried to intensify mining in his county. Between 1524 and 1530, he founded several iron mines around Weilmünster, together with civil partners. His family managed, over time, to gain the majority of the shares in the mining companies. In 1536 Philip issued a uniform mining regulations for his entire territory. However, the economic recovery he had hoped for, failed to materialize.

=== Construction policy ===
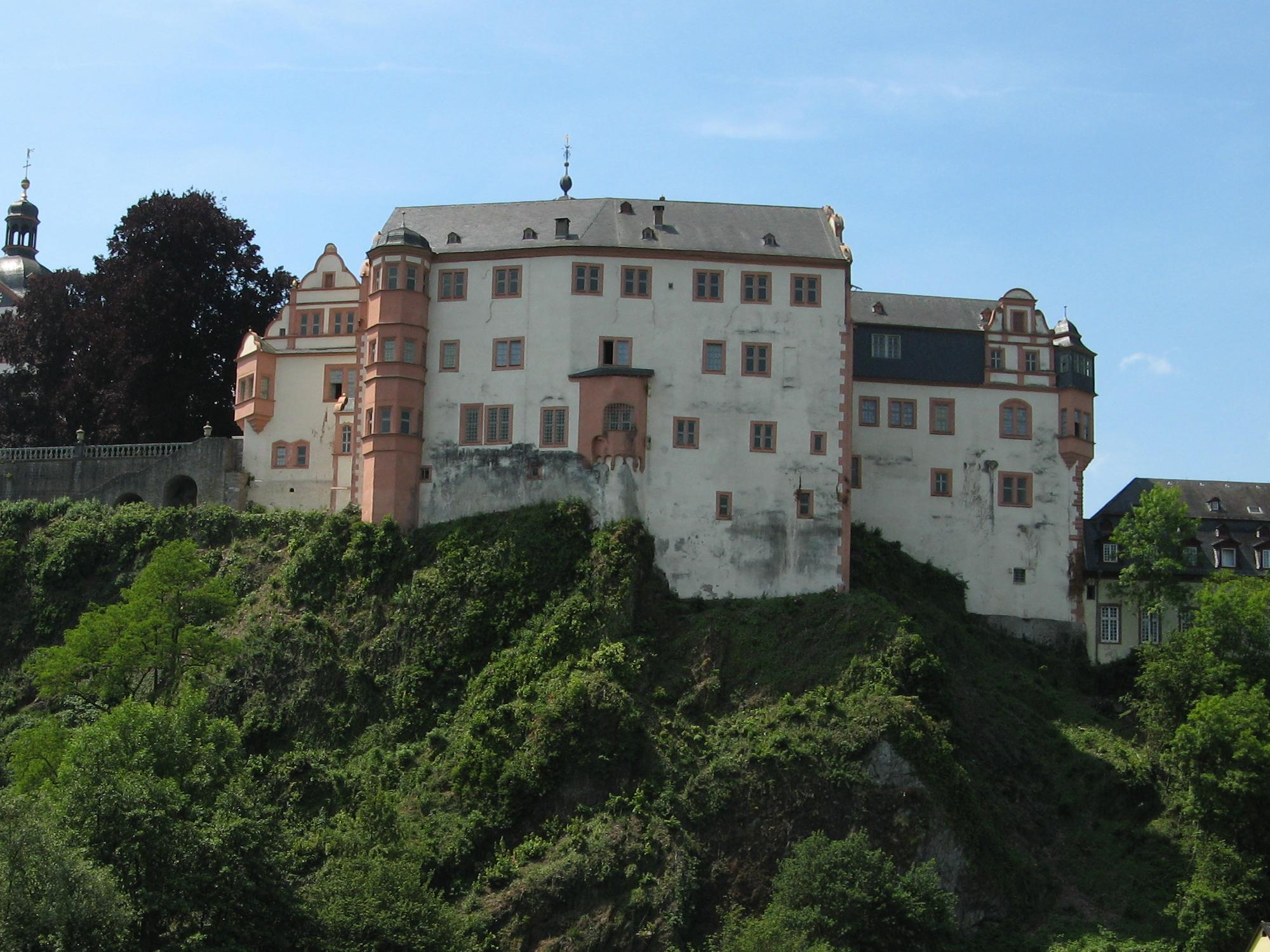
The residence Philip built in Weilburg is the East Wing of Schloss Weilburg

Philip initiated several construction projects in his county. The most important project was the construction of a new residence in Weilburg. Schloss Weilburg was built in two phases. Architect Nicholas Schickedanz from Frankfurt built the east wing, a prestigious residential building. Balthasar Wolff from Heilbronn added the south and west wings, which were used as commercial buildings. The construction lasted from 1533 to 1549. Even today, the alliance coat of arms of Philip III of Nassau-Weilburg and Amalie of Isenburg-Büdingen is attached to the stair tower of the east wing.

The dilapidated town church of Weilburg was repaired and a new tower was added in 1555. This tower also served temporarily a water tower. It was also later incorporated into Schloss Weilburg. Below the schloss, a stone bridge across the Lahn was built in 1555, connecting the dominions of Weilburg and Merenberg.

After the construction at Weilburg had completed, Usingen Castle was again expanded between 1551 and 1558.

=== Reformation ===
The Reformation was introduced in Nassau-Weilburg during Philip's reign. Initially he went along with the Wetterau Association of Imperial Counts. However, from 1526, he increasingly took the lead. The Reformation was rapidly implemented in the areas Philip III held jointly with Philip I of Hesse, such as the Hüttenberg district and the area along the river Lahn, with the towns Heuchelheim, Kinzenbach, Launsbach, Wißmar, Rodheim and Fellingshausen.

Philip attended the meeting of the Wetterau Association on 20 June 1524. The meeting decided not to use the Edict of Worms. This brought Philip into conflict with Archbishop Richard of Trier, who held that Philip was interfering in his spiritual jurisdiction and kept back taxes Richard was entitled to.

During the German Peasants' War, Philip sided with the Archbishops of Mainz and Trier, who attempted to crush the uprising.

The Protestant faith was addressed at the meeting of the Wetterau Association in 1525 in Butzbach in the presence of Count Herman of Neuenahr the Elder. A list of monasteries and abbeys was drafted, so they could be taxed in the future. The abbey at Weilburg, for example, would be taxed 100 guilders; the Pfannstiel monastery at was assessed at 15 guilders.

In 1525/26, Philip appointed Erhard Schnepf as the first Protestant preacher in his county. After the Diet of Speyer in 1526, Schnepf was tasked with implementing the Reformation in Weilburg. When he carried out this task, Schnepf met with opposition from the abbey at Weilburg, the monastery at Pfannstiel and Johann Roß, the town priest of Weilburg. Philip backed Schnepf, despite protests from the archbishops of Mainz and Trier. The Wetterau Association was slowed down by internal squabbles. When the University of Marburg offered Schneps a position, Philip tried to keep him in Weilburg and expelled Johann Roß, who had been a priest in Weilburg for 28 years. Nevertheless, Schneps accepted the position in Marburg in 1528.

The implementation of the Reformation was continued by the court chaplain, Heinrich Stroß. In 1535, he introduced the first comprehensive visitation scheme in Nassau-Weilburg.

The Reformation in Nassau-Weilburg was accelerated after Philip joined the Schmalkaldic League. Philip ordered the dissolution of the small Pfannstiel monastery and the sale of some valuable liturgic vessels from the Benedictine Abbey of Saint Walpurga in Weilburg. In 1540, Philip founded a free school in Weilburg, which quickly became a center of education. It was the forerunner of today's Gymnasium Philippinum Weilburg.

After Heinrich Stroß's death, Kasper Goltwurm was appointed as court chaplain at Weilburg in 1546. In 1547, Goltwurm organized a synod of the clergy in the county of Nassau-Weilburg and lent his hand to the free school. In 1548, Philip officially appointed Goltwurm as visitor.

The Reformation was interrupted by the Augsburg Interim. Goltwurm encouraged priests to resist the Catholic Counter-Reformation operated by the Archbishops of Mainz and Trier. The Counter-Reformation failed, because the bishops did not have enough priests to serve all the parishes and therefore had to leave some reformed pastors in office. In 1550, Philip gave Goltwurn six months leave of absence. Goltwurm travelled to Wittenberg and wrote entitled the beautiful and comforting history of Joseph, which he dedicated to Philip.

Philip and Goltwurm could resume the Reformation after the 1552 Peace of Passau. The Catholic priests who had been appointed during the Counter-Reformation, were relieved of their parishes. Several valuable chalices and vestments were sold off. The abbey at Weilburg received a new order. A synod of Reformed clergy was convened at Weilburg in 1553. The abbey at Weilburg was definitively dissolved on 3 January 1555. The spiritual jurisdiction of the archbishops was repealed with the Peace of Augsburg.

== Marriages and issue ==
In 1523 Philip married Elisabeth of Sayn-Hachenburg (died: 5 February 1531). The Sayn-Hachenburg family were also members of the Wetterau Association of Imperial Counts. Philip and Elisabeth had four children, who all died at a young age.

After Elizabeth's death, Philip married in 1536 with Anne of Mansfield (born: 1520; died: 26 December 1537). This marriage had been mediated by Landgrave Philip I of Hesse. Anne died while giving birth to her only child:

- Albert (born: 26 December 1537; died: 11 November 1593 in Ottweiler).

Οn 17 August 1541 Philip married his third wife, Amalie of Isenburg-Büdingen (born: 23 June 1522; died: 18 May 1579 in Offenbach). This marriage had also been mediated by Philip I of Hesse. With her he had three children:

- Philip IV (born: 14 October 1542; died: 12 March 1602 in Saarbrücken)
- Ottilie (born: 27 July 1546; died: c. 1610), married Count Otto I of Salm-Kyrburg (born: 15 August 1538; died: 7 June 1607)
- Anna Amalie (born: 26 July 1549; died: 7 January 1598), married in 1588 with Count Frederick I of Salm (1547–1608)

== Ancestry ==
Ancestors of Philip III of Nassau-Weilburg

16. Philipp I, Count of Nassau-Weilburg
8. Philip II, Count of Nassau-Weilburg
17. Elisabeth of Lorraine-Vaudémont
4. John III, Count of Nassau-Weilburg
18. John III, Count of Loon
9. Margaret of Loon
19. Walpurgis of Moers
2. Louis I, Count of Nassau-Weilburg
20. Hermann II, Landgrave of Hesse
10. Louis I, Landgrave of Hesse
21. Margaret of Hohenzollern-Nuremberg
5. Elisabeth of Hesse
22. Frederick I, Elector of Saxony
11. Anna of Saxony
23. Catherine of Brunswick-Lüneburg
1. Philip III, Count of Nassau-Weilburg
24. Adolph II, Count of Nassau-Wiesbaden-Idstein
12. John II, Count of Nassau-Wiesbaden-Idstein
25. Margarete of Baden
6. Adolf III of Nassau-Wiesbaden-Idstein
26. Engelbert I of Nassau
13. Maria of Nassau-Dillenburg
27. Johanna van Polanen
3. Marie Margaret of Nassau-Wiesbaden
28. Reinhard II, Count of Hanau
14. Philip I, Count of Hanau-Lichtenberg
29. Catherine of Nassau-Beilstein
7. Margaret of Hanau-Lichtenberg
30. Louis V of Lichtenberg
15. Anna of Lichtenberg
31. Elisabeth of Hohenlohe

== See also ==
- House of Nassau

Philip III of Nassau-Weilburg House of Nassau Born: 20 September 1504 Died: 4 October 1559
Preceded by Louis I	Count of Nassau-Weilburg; 1523-1559	Succeeded by Albert
Preceded by Louis I	Count of Nassau-Weilburg; 1523-1559	Succeeded by Philip IV
