= John III of Nassau-Weilburg =

Count of Nassau-Weilburg (1472-1480)

- Born: 27 June 1441
- Died: 15 July 1480 (aged 39)
- Noble family: House of Nassau
- Spouse: Elisabeth of Hesse
- Issue: Louis I Elisabeth
- Father: Philip II, Count of Nassau-Weilburg
- Mother: Margaret of Loon-Heinsberg

John III of Nassau-Weilburg (27 June 1441 – 15 July 1480) was count of Nassau-Weilburg as co-regent with his father. He came from the Walramian branch of the House of Nassau.

== Biography ==
John was a son of Philip II, Count of Nassau-Weilburg and his wife Margaret of Loon-Heinsberg, daughter of John III of Loon-Heinsberg, Lord of Heinsberg, and Walburga of Moers.

In 1472 his father appointed John as co-regent of the County of Nassau-Weilburg. Father and son shared the revenues of the county. John died in 1480, which forced his father to become the sole ruler of the county again. John was buried at Weilburg. His father became the guardian of the children.

== Marriage and children ==
In 1464 John married Elisabeth "the Handsome" of Hesse (Kassel, 14 December 1453 - 22 April 1489), daughter of Louis I, Landgrave of Hesse and Anne of Saxony. Elisabeth was buried at Weilburg.
Children from this marriage:

1. Louis I, Count of Nassau-Weilburg (1473 (?) - 28 May 1523), succeeded his grandfather in 1490.
2. Elisabeth, died at a young age.

== Sources ==
- This article or an earlier version has been (partially) translated from the Dutch Wikipedia on 8 September 2018.
- Michel Huberty, Alain Giraud, F. & B. Magdelaine, l’Allemagne Dynastique. Tome III Brunswick-Nassau-Schwarzbourg, Alain Giraud, Le Perreux, 1981.
