= Louis I of Nassau-Weilburg =

Louis I, Count of Nassau-Weilburg
- Born: 1473
- Died: 28 May 1523
- Noble family: House of Nassau
- Spouse: Margaret of Nassau-Wiesbaden-Idstein
- Father: John III, Count of Nassau-Weilburg
- Mother: Elisabeth of Hesse

Count Louis I of Nassau-Weilburg (1473 – 28 May 1523) was a son of Count John III of Nassau-Weilburg and his wife, Elisabeth of Hesse. In 1492, Louis I succeeded his grandfather Philip II as Count of Nassau-Weilburg, because his father had already died in 1480.

In 1502, Louis I married Margaret (1487–1548), a daughter of Adolf III of Nassau-Wiesbaden-Idstein and Margarethe von Hanau-Lichtenberg. Louis and Margaret had the following children:

- Philip III (1504–1559)
- Anna (1505–1564), married in 1523 to John III, Count of Nassau-Beilstein
- Louis (1507-1507)
- Louis (1508–1510)
- Elisabeth
- John

== Ancestors ==
Ancestors of Louis I of Nassau-Weilburg

8. Philipp I, Count of Nassau-Weilburg
4. Philip II, Count of Nassau-Weilburg
9. Elisabeth of Lorraine-Vaudémont
2. John III, Count of Nassau-Weilburg
5. Margaret of Loon-Heinsberg
1. Louis I, Count of Nassau-Weilburg
12. Hermann II, Landgrave of Hesse
6. Louis I, Landgrave of Hesse
13. Margaret of Hohenzollern-Nuremberg
3. Elisabeth of Hesse
14. Frederick I, Elector of Saxony
7. Anna of Saxony, Landgravine of Hesse
15. Catherine of Brunswick-Lüneburg

Louis I of Nassau-Weilburg House of Nassau Born: 1473 Died: 28 May 1523
Preceded by Philip II	Count of Nassau-Weilburg; 1492-1523	Succeeded by Philip III
