= George August, Count of Nassau-Idstein =

Prince of Nassau-Idstein (1677–1721)

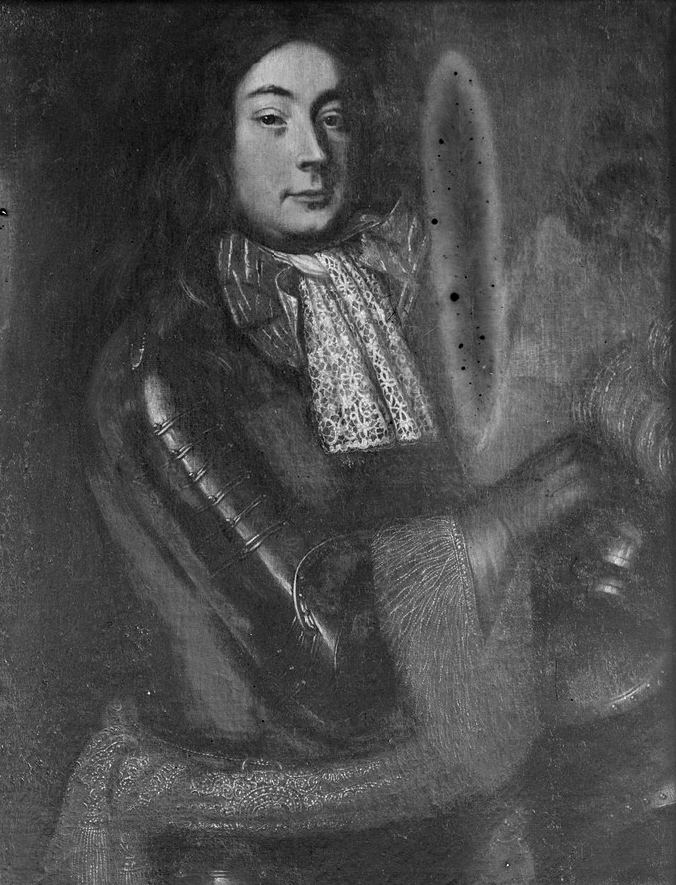
- Born: 26 February 1665; Idstein
- Died: 26 October 1721 (aged 66); Biebrich
- Noble family: House of Nassau
- Spouse: Henriette Dorothea of Oettingen
- Father: John, Count of Nassau-Idstein
- Mother: Anna, Princess of Leiningen-Dagsburg

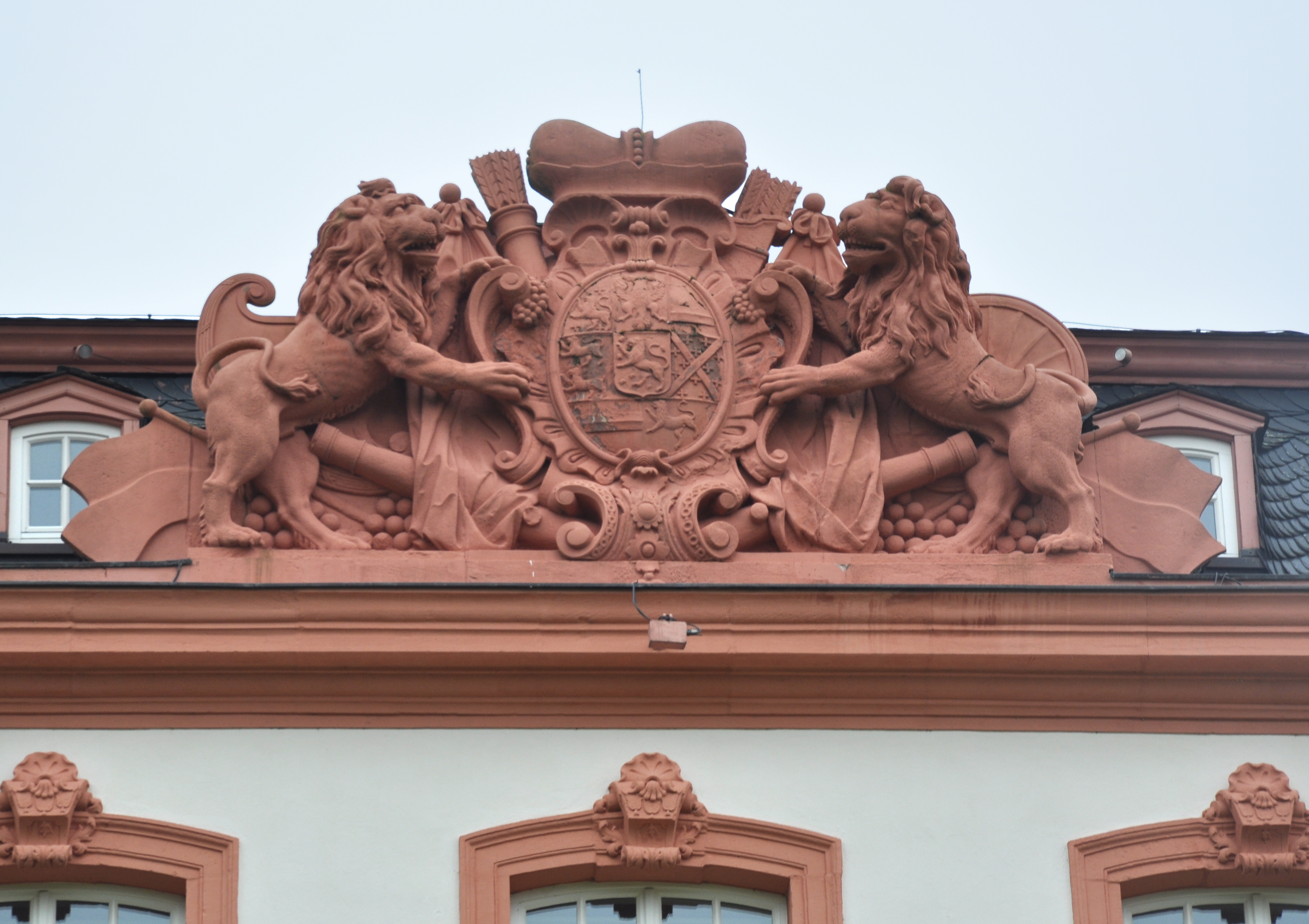
Coat of arms of George August in Schloss Biebrich.

George August Samuel of Nassau-Idstein (26 February 1665, in Idstein – 26 October 1721, in Biebrich) was Graf from 1677, and Prince from 1688 until his death, of Nassau-Idstein. He worked mainly in Wiesbaden.

== Life ==
Georg August was just 12 years old when his father John died in 1677. Two regents took up government: Count John Caspar of Leiningen-Dagsburg and Count John August of Solms. George August studied in Giessen, Strasbourg and Paris, and later in England and Brabant. During his Grand Tour, he visited several European courts; he was particularly impressed by the Palace of Versailles. In 1683, he participated in the defense of Vienna during the siege and battle of Vienna. One year later, he became the reigning count on his 18th birthday. On 4 August 1688, Emperor Leopold I raised him to Prince as a reward for his services at Vienna, and also because he had paid a large sum of money.

On 22 November, he married Princess Henriette Dorothea of Oettingen (born: 14 November 1672 in Oettingen in Bayern; died: 23 May 1728 in Wiesbaden) a daughter of Prince Albert Ernest I of Oettingen and Christiane Friederike of Württemberg. They had twelve children, three boys and nine girls. However, two of the girls and all three boys died in early childhood.

The city of Wiesbaden and the whole county of Nassau-Idstein had suffered badly during the Thirty Years' War and again during the plague in 1675. Only a few dozen of the original 1800 inhabitants were still alive. Under George August both experienced an enormous upswing. He initiated a number of construction projects. He completed the residential palace in Idstein, he constructed the Herrengarten park and the Pheasants Park in Wiesbaden, he constructed a French formal garden on thebanks of the Rhine at Biebrich and he remodeled the City Palace at Wiesbaden. A garden house was the only part of the future Biebrich Palace completed during his lifetime.

George died of smallpox in August 1721, as did his two youngest daughters.

== Legacy ==
The Georgenthal manor was named after him; the Henriettenthaler Hof manor was named after his wife.

== Issue ==
- Frederick Ernest (born: 27 August 1689 in Idstein; died: 21 March 1690 in Idstein), Hereditary Prince of Nassau-Idstein, died in infancy
- Christine Louise (born: 31 March 1691 in Idstein; died: 13 April 1723 in Aurich), married on 23 September 1709 with Prince George Albert of East Frisia (1689 – 1734)
- Charlotte Eberhardine (born: 16 July 1692 in Idstein; died: 6 February 1693 in Idstein), died in infancy
- Henriette Charlotte (born: 9 November 1693 in Idstein; died: 8 April 1734 in Delitzsch), married on 4 November 1711 with Duke Maurice Wilhelm of Saxe-Merseburg (1688 – 1731)
- Eleanor Charlotte (born: 28 November 1696 in Idstein; died: 8 December 1696 in Idstein), died in infancy
- Albertine Juliane (born: 29 March 1698 in Idstein; died: 9 October 1722 in Marksuhl), married on 14 February 1713 with Duke Wilhelm Heinrich of Saxe-Eisenach (1691 – 1741)
- Auguste Friederike (born: 17 August 1699 in Idstein; died: 8 June 1750 in Kirchheim unter Teck), married on 17 August 1723 with Prince Charles August of Nassau-Weilburg (1685 – 1753)
- Johannette Wilhelmine (born: 14 September 1700 in Idstein; died: 2 June 1756 in Lemgo), married on 16 October 1719 with Count Simon Henry Adolph of Lippe-Detmold (1694 – 1734)
- Frederick August (born: 30 April 1702 in Idstein, died: 30 January 1703 in Idstein), Hereditary Prince of Nassau-Idstein, died in infancy
- William Samuel (born: 14 February 1704 in Idstein; died: 4 May 1704 in Idstein), Hereditary Prince of Nassau-Idstein, died in infancy
- Elisabeth Francisca (born: 17 September 1708 in Idstein; died: 7 November 1721 in Idstein), died young
- Charlotte Louise (born: 17 March 1710 in Idstein; died: 4 November 1721 in Biebrich), died young

== Footnotes ==
George August, Count of Nassau-Idstein House of Nassau Born: 26 February 1665 Died: 26 October 1721
Preceded by John	Count of Nassau-Idstein; 1677-1721	Succeeded by Frederick Louis
