= Anna of Nassau-Dillenburg (1541–1616) =

- Born: 21 September 1541; Dillenburg
- Died: 12 February 1616 (aged 74); Weilburg
- Noble family: House of Nassau
- Spouse: Albert, Count of Nassau-Weilburg
- Father: William I of Nassau-Siegen
- Mother: Juliana of Stolberg

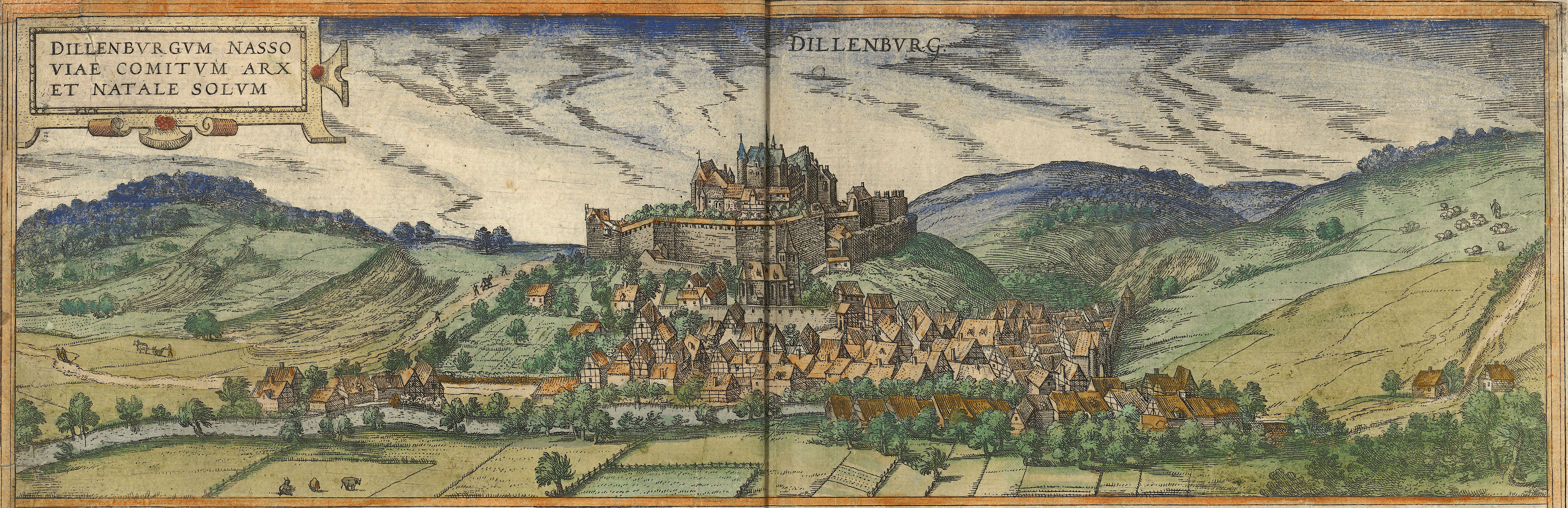
Dillenburg in 1575, showing the old castle at the top of the hill and the St. Johanniskirche below it

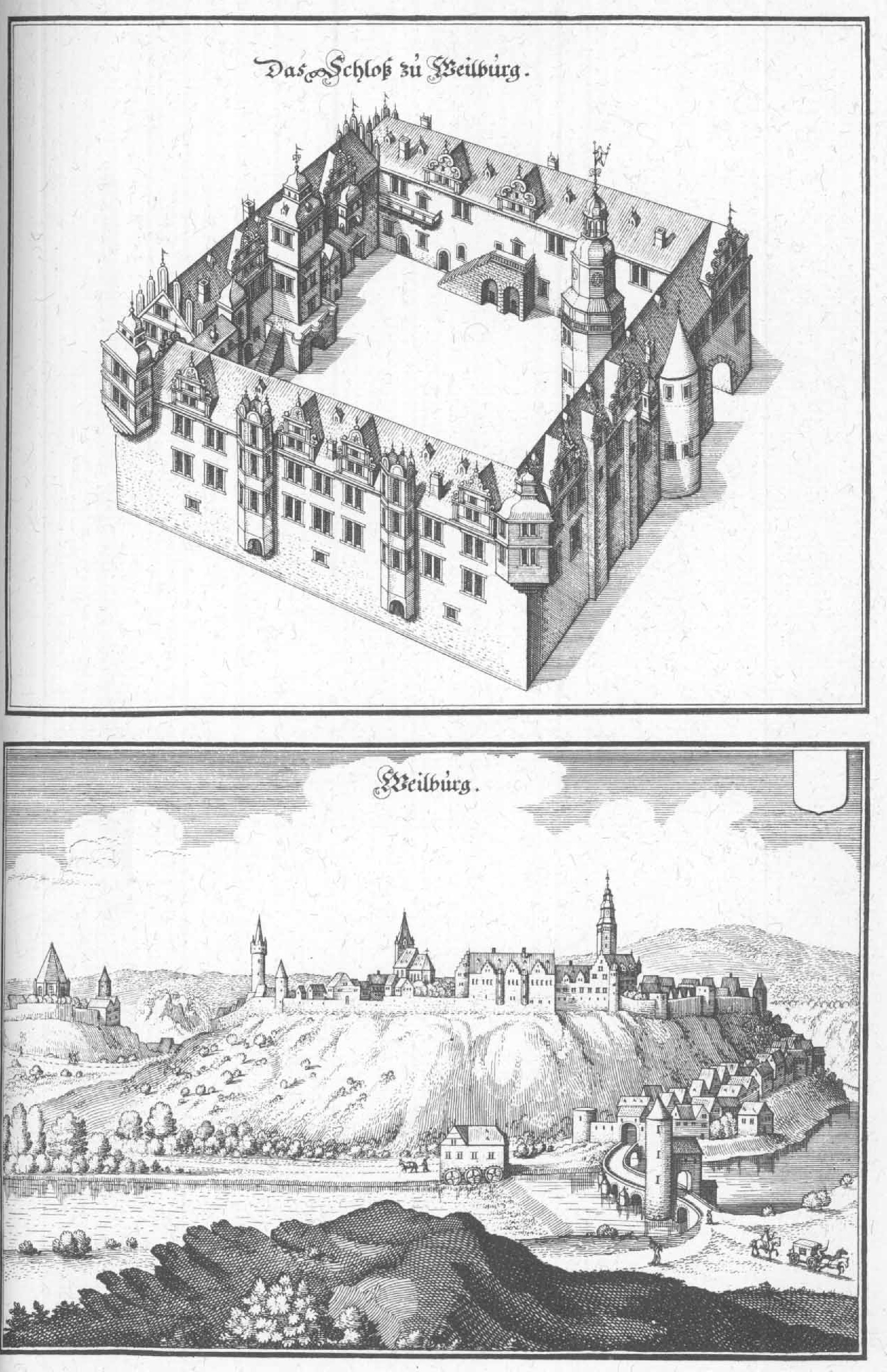
Schloss Weilburg

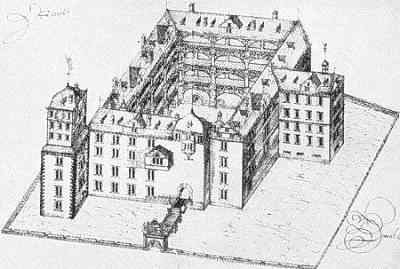
Castle of Ottweiler.

Anna of Nassau-Dillenburg (21 September 1541 in Dillenburg – 12 February 1616 in Weilburg) was a countess of the House of Nassau. She married her cousin Albert, Count of Nassau-Weilburg and settled in Schloss Weilburg, where he ruled the district of Weilburg.

== Life ==
Anna was a daughter of Count William "the Rich" of Nassau-Dillenburg and his second wife, Countess Juliana of Stolberg. She was the seventh child in their marriage, the fourth daughter. The eldest was William I of Orange (1533–1584), known as William the Silent. She had the same name as her aunt Anne of Nassau-Siegen (1440/41–1514), who had died twenty seven years before she was born.

She married Count Albert, Count of Nassau-Weilburg on 16 June 1559 in the Castle of Dillenburg. On that day in Dillenburg two other marriages in the House of Orange took place: Johann VI of Nassau-Dillenburg married Elisabeth of Leuchtenberg, and Elisabeth of Nassau-Dillenburg married Conrad, Count of Solms-Braunfels.

Over the years their house inherited part of the county of Nassau-Weilburg. After his father's death in 1561, Albert gained part of territory and his father's debts: Weilburg, Gleiberg, Cleen, labor and Burgschwalbach.

In 1574 he inherited another part of Nassau-Saarbrücken after the death of Count John III. In 1574 a new castle was built in Ottweiler, which became their residence.

=== Family ===
Albert and Anna had the following fourteen children:

- Anna Amalia (1560–1635), married Count Otto of Solms-Sonnewalde
- Juliane (1562)
- Catherine (1563–1613), died unmarried
- Louis II of Nassau-Weilburg (1565–1627); inherited Ottweiler
- George Philip (1567–1570)
- Albert (1569–1570)
- William (1570–1597); inherited Weilburg
- Elizabeth (1572–1607), married Count George II of Sayn-Wittgenstein-Berleburg
- Juliane (born: 1574)
- John Casimir (1577–1602), married Elisabeth, a daughter of George I of Hesse-Darmstadt; inherited Gleiberg
- Anna Ottilie (1582–1635), married Count William III of Sayn-Wittgenstein
- Anna Sibylla (born: 1575), married Baron Peter Ernest II of Kriechingen-Püttlingen
- Magdalena (1580–1658), died unmarried
- Ernestina (1584–1665), married Louis Philip of Wied
