= Frederick, Count of Nassau-Weilburg =

German count (1640–1675)

- Born: 26 April 1640; Metz
- Died: 8 September 1675 (aged 35)
- Noble family: Nassau
- Spouse: Christiane Elisabeth of Sayn-Wittgenstein-Homburg
- Father: Ernest Casimir, Count of Nassau-Weilburg
- Mother: Anna Maria of Sayn-Wittgenstein-Hachenburg

Frederick of Nassau-Weilburg (born 26 April 1640 in Metz – died 8 September 1675) was the ruling Count of Nassau-Weilburg from 1655 to 1675.

He was the son of Ernest Casimir (1607–1655), and Anna Maria of Sayn-Wittgenstein-Hachenburg (1610–1656).

His parents fled to Metz during the Thirty Years' War. Frederick was born in Metz and spent his early years there. After the end of the war, the family returned to a devastated country. Frederick inherited Nassau-Weilburg in 1655. As he was still a minor at the time, his uncle John acted as regent. When he married in 1663, he was declared an adult and took up government himself.

In 1672, the Franco-Dutch War broke out. Nassau-Weilburg remained neutral, but suffered nevertheless from troops passing through.

Frederick died in 1675 of a riding accident. Count John Louis acted as regent for Frederick's children, who were still minors.

== Marriage and issue ==
Frederick married on 26 May 1663 with Christiane Elisabeth of Sayn-Wittgenstein-Homburg (1646–1678). She was the daughter of Count Ernest of Sayn-Wittgenstein-Homburg (1599–1649). They had the following children:

- John Ernst (born: 13 June 1664; died: 27 January 1719), married in 1683 with Marie Polyxena of Leiningen-Hartsburg (1662–1725)
- Frederick William Louis (born: 21 August 1665; died: 14 August 1684, fell in battle before Buda)
- Marie Christiane (born: 6 November 1666; died: 18 December 1734)

Frederick, Count of Nassau-Weilburg House of Nassau Born: 26 April 1640 Died: 8 September 1675
Preceded by Ernest Casimir	Count of Nassau-Weilburg; 1655-1675	Succeeded by John Ernst
