= Louis II of Nassau-Weilburg =

German noble (1565–1627)

Louis II, Count of Nassau-Weilburg
- Born: 9 August 1565; Weilburg
- Died: 8 November 1627 (aged 62); Saarbrücken
- Noble family: House of Nassau
- Spouse: Anna Maria of Hesse-Kassel
- Father: Albert, Count of Nassau-Weilburg
- Mother: Anna of Nassau-Dillenburg

Louis II of Nassau-Weilburg (9 August 1565, Weilburg – 8 November 1627, Saarbrücken) was a count of Nassau-Weilburg.

== Life ==
Louis was the eldest son of Count Albert of Nassau-Weilburg-Ottweiler and Countess Anna of Nassau-Dillenburg. His family moved in 1575 from Weilburg to Ottweiler. After his education, he traveled through Europe, in particular the French-speaking part of Switzerland. He also visited France and princely courts in Germany. During his visit to William IV of Hesse-Kassel, he met William's daughter Anna Maria and fell in love with her. He married her on 4 June 1589.

After Albert died on 11 November 1593, the inheritance was divided among his three sons. Louis received the areas Ottweiler, Homburg, Kirchheim and Lahr in the left bank of the Rhine. His brothers William (died: 25 November 1597) and John Casimir (died: 29 March 1602) chose the Weilburg part, which also fell to Louis after they died. Louis also inherited the territories of his uncle Philip IV of Nassau-Saarbrücken (died: 12 March 1602) and John Louis II of Nassau-Wiesbaden (died: 9 June 1605), who was the last of his line. So he ended up combining the entire property of the Walram line in one hand.

Louis moved his seat of government to Saarbrücken Castle. He issued a series of regulations, and provided a better education for his population (e.g. through the establishment of the Louis Gymnasium Saarland in Saarbrücken and the promotion of elementary schools. He committed himself to make the Saar navigable and supported many construction projects. Prosperity increased during his reign. However, the Thirty Years' War also began during his reign.

He instructed his registrar Johann Andreae to reorganize the Saarbrücken Archives and the painter Henrich Dors from Altweilnau to design tomb for the Nassau family, resulting in a major "epitaph book" being published in 1632.

Louis had fourteen children, including four sons who survived him and they divided his inheritance: William Louis, John, Ernest Casimir and Otto.

== Marriage and issue ==
Louis married on 4 June 1589 Anna Maria of Hesse-Kassel (1567–1626), daughter of Landgrave William IV of Hesse-Kassel.

- William Louis (1590–1640) married on 25 November 1615 Anna Amalia of Baden-Durlach (born: 9 July 1595; died: 18 November 1651), daughter of Margrave George Frederick of Baden-Durlach
- Anna Sabina (1591–1593)
- Albert (1593–1595)
- Sophia Amalia (1594–1612)
- George Adolf (1595–1596)
- Philip (1597–1621)
- Louise Juliana (1598–1622)
- Moritz (1599–1601)
- Charles Ernest (1600–1604)
- Mary Elizabeth (1602–1626)
- John (1603–1677), Count of Nassau-Idstein

married firstly on 6 June 1629 Sibylle Magdalene (born: 21 July 1605; died: 22 July 1644), daughter of Margrave George Frederick of Baden-Durlach
married secondly in 1646 Countess Anna of Leiningen-Falkenburg (1625–1668)

- Dorothea (1605–1620)
- Ernest Casimir (1607–1655), Count of Nassau-Weilburg

married in 1634 Countess Anna Maria of Sayn-Wittgenstein-Homburg (1610–1656)

- Otto (1610–1632)

== See also ==
- List of counts of Nassau-Saarbrücken

Louis II of Nassau-Weilburg House of Nassau Born: 9 August 1565 Died: 8 November 1627
| Preceded by Philip IV | Count of Nassau-Saarbrücken; 1602-1627 | Succeeded by William Louis |
| Preceded by John Louis II | Count of Nassau-Wiesbaden-Idstein; 1605-1627 | Succeeded by William Louis |
