= Albert, Count of Nassau-Weilburg =

16th Century Count of Nassau-Weilburg

- Born: 26 December 1537; Weilburg
- Died: 11 November 1593 (aged 55); Ottweiler
- Noble family: House of Nassau
- Spouse: Anna of Nassau-Dillenburg
- Father: Philip III, Count of Nassau-Weilburg
- Mother: Anna of Mansfeld

Albert of Nassau-Weilburg-Ottweiler (26 December 1537, Weilburg – 11 November 1593, Ottweiler), was a count of the House of Nassau. His territory included the areas around Weilburg, Ottweiler and Lahr in the Black Forest. Like his father, Philip III of Nassau-Weilburg he was an advocate of the Reformation.

== Life ==
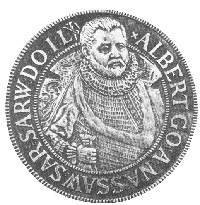

Albert was the only son of Philip III of Nassau-Weilburg and his second wife, Countess Anna of Mansfeld. His mother died in childbirth.

On 16 June 1559, Albert married Anna of Nassau-Dillenburg, a daughter of Count William "the Rich" of Nassau-Siegen and sister of William I of Orange. In the same year, on 4 October 1559, his father, Philip III died. Albert inherited part of the county of Nassau-Weilburg jointly with his younger half-brother, Philip IV. Albert initially ruled jointly with Philip IV. They had inherited a high debt, which hampered their ability to rule. They were however, able to slowly improve their financial position.

On 15 May 1561, the brothers split their territory for the first time. Albert was given Schloss Weilburg and the district of Weilburg, Philip received castle and district of Neuweilnau. The largest part of the territory and their father's debts, however, remained the common property. Albert moved into the new Schloss Weilburg, which he continued to expand. In 1571, they split the rest of the territory. Apart from Weilburg, Albert received Gleiberg, Cleen, Wehen and Burgschwalbach. Albert and Philip concluded several treaties with Hesse, in which they gradually divided their shared possessions.

Albert was a member of the Wetterau Association of Imperial Counts. He often travelled to the Imperial Diet and to the Emperor Maximilian II as a representative of the Wetterau Association, to discuss freedom of religion for the Calvinist princes. From 1583 to 1588, Albert fought in the Cologne War on the side of the Wetterau Association.

When Count John III of Nassau-Saarbrücken died in 1574 without a male heir, the Counties of Saarbrücken, Saarwerden and Ottweiler passed to Albert and Philip. They divided them: Philip received Saarbrücken and Saarland; Albert received Ottweiler, the districts of Homburg and Kirchheim and the Lordships of Lahr and Mahlberg in the Black Forest. Albert built a new castle in Ottweiler, which became his residence. As the eldest member of the Walram line of the House of Nassau, Albert took up guardianship of John Louis of Nassau-Wiesbaden. As head of the house, he set guidelines for foreign policy.

The Saarbrücken inheritance was contested by various sides. Duke Charles of Lorraine claimed the county of Saarwerden. Albert, however, prevailed before the Reichskammergericht. Elector Palatine Frederick III also claimed some of the Nassau territories; Albert was able to settle this issue out of court. Albert and Frederick concluded several treaties, in which the exact rights and boundaries of the various territories were defined. After Frederick III died in 1576, Albert was the executor of his last will and testament.

In 1579, Albert extended his influence in Rhenish Hesse by purchasing a share of Jugenheim.

Albert died on 11 November 1593 at his castle in Ottweiler. After his death, his three sons jointly ruled his territory. However, two of them died shortly after their father so that the surviving son of Louis II ruled alone from 1602 onwards.

=== Reformation ===
In his childhood at Neuweilnau Castle, he was educated in the Protestant faith by Kasper Goltwurm. Through Goltwurm, Albert became acquainted with Philipp Melanchthon, with whom he had lively correspondence.

Kasper Goltwurm was succeeded in 1560 by Jacob Charsisius, who worked in Nassau-Weilburg as Superintendent until his death. At the request of Charsisius, some Catholic customs, such a celebrating carnival and lighting a bonfire on St. John's Eve were made punishable offenses in the Nassau-Weilburg territories. Lorenz Stephani was appointed as superintendent in the areas administered jointly by Hesse and Nassau. He also succeeded as superintendent of Weilburg in 1572, and in Ottweiler in 1574. In Ottweiler, Albert and Lorenz Stephani took measures to enforce the Reformation. Catholic priests were converted to the new faith or removed from office; monasteries were dissolved; church property was confiscated; schools were set up and jus patronatus was purchased.

In 1567 and 1568, Albert met his brother-in-law William of Orange several times. Albert supported him in the Dutch War of Independence against the "Iron Duke" Fernando Álvarez de Toledo, 3rd Duke of Alba. The invasion of the Netherlands in 1568, however failed. Albert vouched for the wages of the mercenaries William had hired.

=== Construction policy ===
Albert initiated several large construction projects. After the first division of the county, he began converting the castle at Weilburg into a palace. To this end, he commissioned the architect Ludwig Kempf. During this phase, the north wing and the Stadtpfeiferturm (City Piper Tower) were added. The joint coat of arms of Albert and Anna is still attached to the tower. Around this time, he also founded a game park in Weilburg, which still exists.

After he inherited Ottweiler, Albert commissioned the architect Christmann Strohmeyer to construct a Renaissance style castle at Ottweiler. This castle was abandoned in 1753 due to disrepair. Albert probably also initiated the expansion of Gleiberg Castle in the late 16th century, after it had fallen entirely to the House of Nassau.

== Issue ==
Albert and Countess Anna of Nassau-Dillenburg (1541–1616) had the following children:

- Anna Amalia (1560–1635), married Count Otto of Solms-Sonnewalde
- Juliane (1562–1562)
- Catherine (1563–1613), died unmarried
- Louis II (1565–1627); inherited Ottweiler
- George Philip (1567–1570)
- Albert (1569–1570)
- William (1570–1597); inherited Weilburg
- Elisabeth (1572–1607), married Count George II of Sayn-Wittgenstein-Berleburg
- Juliane (born: 1574)
- John Casimir (1577–1602), married Landgravine Elisabeth of Hesse-Darmstadt, a daughter of George I, Landgrave of Hesse-Darmstadt; inherited Gleiberg
- Anna Ottilie (1582–1635), married Count William III of Sayn-Wittgenstein
- Anna Sibylla (born: 1575), married Baron Peter Ernest II of Krichingen-Püttlingen
- Magdalena (1580–1658), died unmarried
- Ernestina (1584–1665), married Count Louis Philip of Wied

Albert, Count of Nassau-Weilburg House of Nassau Born: 26 December 1537 11 November
Preceded by Philip III	Count of Nassau-Weilburg; 1559–1593	Succeeded by Louis II, William and John Casimir
