= John, Count of Nassau-Idstein =

17th Century Count of Nassau-Idstein

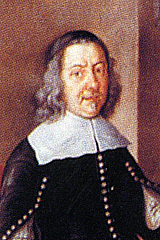
- John, Count of Nassau-Idstein
- Born: 24 November 1603; Saarbrücken
- Died: 23 May 1677 (aged 73); Idstein
- Noble family: House of Nassau
- Spouses: Sibylla Magdalena of Baden-Durlach; Anna of Leiningen-Dagsburg-Falkenburg
- Father: Louis II, Count of Nassau-Weilburg
- Mother: Anna Maria of Hesse-Kassel

Count John of Nassau-Idstein (born 24 November 1603 in Saarbrücken; died: 23 May 1677 in Idstein) was Count of Nassau and Protestant Regent of Idstein.

== Life ==
His parents were Louis II, Count of Nassau-Weilburg (1565–1627) and his wife, Landgräfin Anna Maria of Hesse-Kassel (1567–1626). His father had in 1605 reunited all the possessions of the Walram line of the House of Nassau: Saarbrücken, Weilburg and Idstein. His brother was William Louis. When the brothers divided their father's inheritance on 29 January 1629 in Ottweiler, William Louis received the County of Saarbrücken, the district of Ottweiler, the Bailiwick of Herbitzheim, and the community of Saarwellingen. John received the Lordship of Idstein, Wiesbaden and Sonnenberg. The two younger brothers, Ernest Casimir and Otto received Wehener Grund and the district of Burgschwalbach. However, since they were still minors, William Louis administered those territories as regent.

Shortly thereafter, their territories were put at risk by the Imperial Edict of Restitution of 2 March 1629, when the Prince-Archbishops of Mainz and Trier claimed restitution of church properties that had been confiscated after the Peace of Passau of 1552. On 7 July 1629, the Reichskammergericht ruled that the House of Nassau had to return city and castle of Sarrewerden, Bouquenom and Wieberstweiler to the Bishopric of Metz as fiefs of Lorraine. They were allowed to keep their other disputed possessions.

In 1629 he married Sibylla Magdalena of Baden-Durlach (born: 21 July 1605; died: 26 July 1644 in Strasbourg), daughter of George Frederick, Margrave of Baden-Durlach and Wild- and Rhinegravine Juliane Ursula of Salm-Neufville.

When, at the end of that year, King Gustavus Adolphus of Sweden appeared the Rhine, presented William Louis, John and Ernest Casimir joined him in his war against the Emperor. After King Gustavus Adolphus had fallen on 16 November 1632, the three counts committed themselves on a meeting of Protestant princes in Heilbronn to continue fighting the Emperor, now under the Swedish Chancellor Axel Oxenstierna. John signed the alliance with France against the Emperor on 5 September 1633, as the representative of the Nassau brothers.

The youngest brother, Otto, died on 24 November 1632. On 11 December, Ernest Casimir came of age and the brothers decided to revise the division of the inheritance. In this new division, Ernest Casimir received the districts of Weilburg and Mehrenberg, the County of Gleiberg and the districts of Kirchheim and Stauf, which had been Otto's. The brothers decided to share the district of Usingen and Stockheim. In 1634 in Frankfurt, the brothers reached a compromise with the Lords of hohengeroldseck over the ownership of Lahr.

After Sweden and its allies were defeated, Emperor Ferdinand II terminated the fief of the Nassau territories. On 30 May 1635, a number of Imperial Princes, including the Electors of Brandenburg and Saxony, had closed the Peace of Prague, which granted amnesty to most of the princes who had fought against the emperor. The Counts of Nassau, however, had been explicitly excluded from this amnesty. John chose to go into exile to Strasbourg. In November 1635, imperial commissioner Bertram von Sturm arrived in Nassau and announced an imperial ban on the three brothers. All their territories and possessions were declared forfeited. Until 1646, the citizens of Idstein would suffer from hunger, disease and military despotism.

Countess Magdalena Sibylla died in 1644 at the age of 39. On 6 December 1646, John remarried in Strasbourg, with Countess Anna of Leiningen-Dagsburg-Falkenburg (born: 25 May 1625 in Dagsburg; died: 24 December 1688 in Idstein), daughter of Count Philip George of Leiningen-Dagsburg-Falkenburg und Countess Anna of Erbach. After the marriage ceremony, John returned to Idstein with his new wife.

In 1653, his eldest son became a Catholic. John disowned him. In 1665, his son George August Samuel was born. He would become John's successor.

In 1666, the construction of a new church in Idstein began.

In 1668, the plague broke out in Idstein. Countess Anna died at the age of 43.

In 1672, John made an unsuccessful bid to be raised to the rank of Imperial Prince.

== Witch hunts ==
In 1630, witch trials began in his territory and John ordered pastors to preach against the havoc brought about by witchcraft.

In 1658, Amtmann Plebanus began prosecuting witches.

In 1676, more witch trials were conducted in Idstein and, between 3 February 1676 and 31 March 1677, 31 women and 8 men were executed for witchcraft. Persecutions ended following John's death on 23 May 1677, at the age of 74.

== Successor ==
Johann was succeeded by his son George August Samuel, who was only 12 years old when he died, so his uncle Count Johann Kasimir of Leiningen-Dagsburg-Falkenburg (1619-1688) acted as regent during his minority. Count Johann Kasimir described the office of a regent in his "political testament" as a task for with the regent must later give account before God.

== Issue ==
Johann married twice:

Firstly, he married Sibylle Magdalene, daughter of George Frederick, Margrave of Baden-Durlach, in 1629. They had six children:

1. Ottile Anna (1630–1632)
2. Gustav Adolph (1632–1664)
3. Louis Frederick (1633–1656)
4. Bernhardine Sofie (1634–1642)
5. John (1638–1658)
6. Juliane Sabine (1639-1639)

Secondly, he married Countess Anna zu Leiningen-Dagsburg-Falkenburg in 1646. They had ten children:

1. Charles (1649–1651)
2. Christine Elizabeth (1651–1676)
3. Eleanor Louise (1653–1677)
4. Ernestine (1654–1655)
5. George William (1656–1657)
6. Johanette (1657–1733), married Count Christian Louis, Count of Waldeck (d. 1706)
7. Sibylle Charlotte (1658–1660)
8. Dorothea Amalie (1661–1740), married Count Louis Frederick of Wied (d. 1709) without Issue
9. Philip Louis (1662–1664)
10. George August Samuel (1665–1721), married Princess Henriette Dorothea of Oettingen-Oettingen (1672–1728), daughter of Prince Albert Ernest I of Oettingen-Oettingen

== See also ==
- House of Nassau

== Footnotes ==
John, Count of Nassau-Idstein House of Nassau Born: 24 November 1603 Died: 23 May 1677
Preceded by Louis II	Count of Nassau-Weilburg; 1627-1629; With: William Louis, Ernest Casimir and Otto	Nassau-Weilburg divided
New division	Count of Nassau-Idstein; 1629-1677	Succeeded by George August Samuel
