= Adolph III of Nassau-Wiesbaden-Idstein =

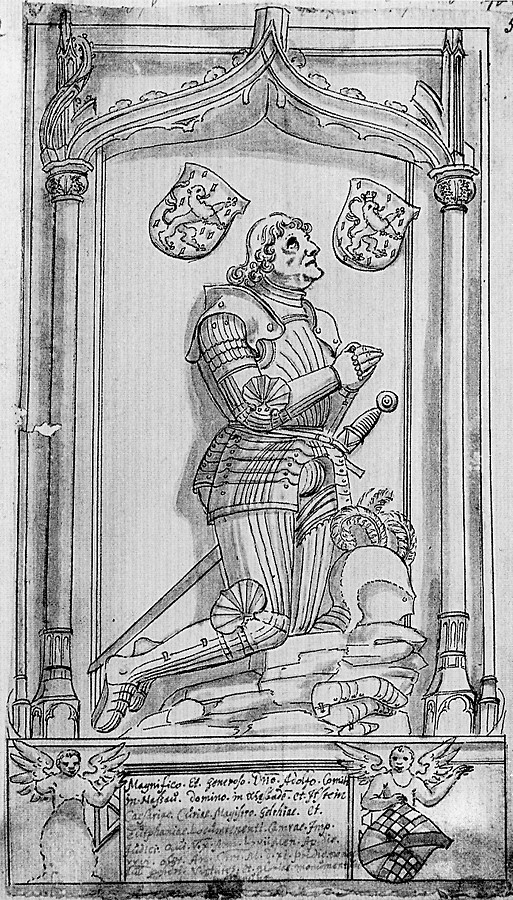
- Born: 10 November 1443
- Died: 6 July 1511 (aged 67)
- Noble family: House of Nassau
- Spouse: Margarethe von Hanau-Lichtenberg
- Father: John II, Count of Nassau-Wiesbaden-Idstein
- Mother: Mary of Nassau-Siegen

Count Adolph III of Nassau-Wiesbaden-Idstein (by a different way of counting: Adolph IV; 10 November 1443 – 6 July 1511) was a son of Count John II of Nassau-Wiesbaden-Idstein and his wife Mary of Nassau-Siegen (1418–1472). After his father's death in 1480, he ruled Nassau-Wiesbaden and his brother Philip ruled Nassau-Idstein. After Philip's childless death in 1509, Adolf III ruled also ruled Nassau-Idstein.

Adolph served in the army of the Habsburg Duke consort and later Emperor Maximilian I and participated in the conquest of the Duchy of Gelre in 1478. In 1481, he was appointed stadtholder of the County of Zutphen and in 1489 also as stadtholder of Gelre. However, in 1492 Charles II was reinstated as Duke of Guelders. Adolph then returned to Germany

== Marriage and issue ==
He married in 1484 to Margarethe von Hanau-Lichtenberg, a daughter of Philip I of Hanau-Lichtenberg. Their children were:

- Maria Margaret (1487–1548), married in 1502 to Louis I, Count of Nassau-Weilburg,
- Anna (1488–1550), married in 1506 to Henry XXXI of Schwarzburg-Sondershausen,
- Philip I (1490–1558), who succeeded him.

== Ancestry ==
Ancestors of Adolph III of Nassau-Wiesbaden-Idstein

16. Adolph I, Count of Nassau-Wiesbaden-Idstein
8. Walram IV, Count of Nassau-Idstein
17. Margaret of Nuremberg
4. Adolph II, Count of Nassau-Wiesbaden-Idstein
18. Johann I of Westerburg
9. Bertha of Westerburg
19. Kunigunde of Sayn
2. John II, Count of Nassau-Wiesbaden-Idstein
20. Rudolf VI, Margrave of Baden
10. Bernard I, Margrave of Baden-Baden
21. Matilde of Sponheim
5. Margaret of Baden
22. Ludwig XI of Oettingen
11. Anna of Oettingen
23. Beatrix of Helfenstein-Blaubeuren
1. Adolf III of Nassau-Wiesbaden-Idstein
24. Otto II, Count of Nassau-Siegen
12. John I, Count of Nassau-Siegen
25. Adelaide of Vianden
6. Engelbert I of Nassau
26. Adolph II of the Marck
13. Margaret of the Mark
27. Margareta of Cleves
3. Mary of Nassau-Siegen
28. John II, Lord of Polanen
14. John III, Lord of Polanen
29. Oda of Horne
7. Johanna van Polanen
30. Johann II, Count of Salm-Obersalm
15. Odilia (Oda) of Salm-Ravenstein
31. Philippa of Heinsberg-Valkenburg

== Footnotes ==
Adolph III of Nassau-Wiesbaden-Idstein House of Nassau Born: 10 November 1443 Died: 6 July 1511
German nobility
| Preceded by John II | Count of Nassau-Wiesbaden; 1480–1511 | Succeeded by Philip I |
| Preceded by Philip | Count of Nassau-Idstein; 1509–1511 | Succeeded by Philip I |
Political offices
| Preceded by Willem van Egmond jr. | Stadtholder of Guelders; 1481–1492 | Succeeded by John V |
