= Mary of Nassau-Siegen (1418–1472) =

German countess (1418–1472)

- Countess Consort of Nassau-Wiesbaden-Idstein
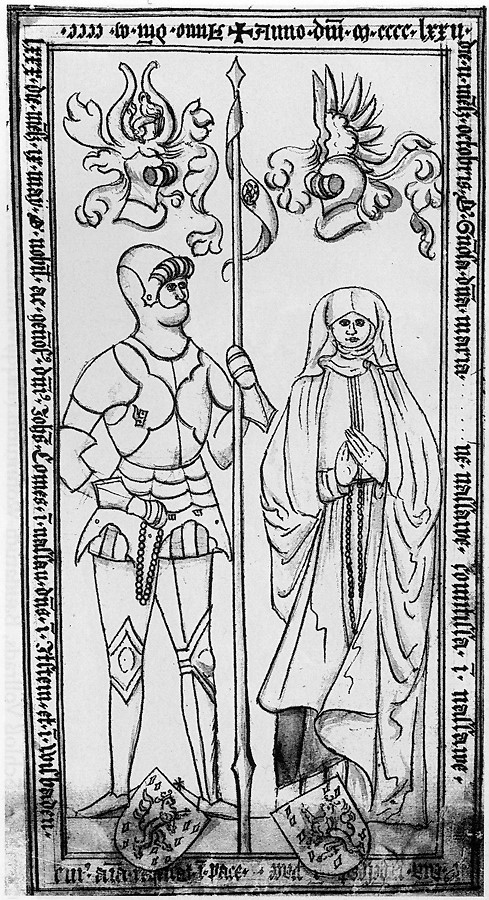
- The epitaph for Countess Mary of Nassau-Siegen and Count John of Nassau-Wiesbaden-Idstein in the Unionskirche in Idstein. Drawing by Heinrich Dors from his Epitaphienbuch, 1632.

- Coat of arms
- Full name: Mary Countess of Nassau-Siegen
- Native name: Maria Gräfin von Nassau-Siegen
- Born: Mary Gräfin zu Nassau, Vianden und Diez, Frau zu Breda; 2 February 1418
- Died: 11 October 1472 (aged 54)
- Buried: Unionskirche, Idstein
- Noble family: House of Nassau-Siegen
- Spouse: John of Nassau-Wiesbaden-Idstein
- Issue Detail: Mary; John; Margaret; Anne; Adolf III; Bertha; Engelbert; Philip; Anne
- Father: Engelbert I of Nassau-Siegen
- Mother: Joanne of Polanen

Countess Mary of Nassau-Siegen (Note: In many sources she is called Mary of Nassau-Dillenburg. The County of Nassau-Siegen is erroneously called Nassau-Dillenburg in many sources. The county was not named after the small, unimportant city of Dillenburg, which did not even have a church until 1491, but after the, for that time, large city of Siegen, the economic centre of the county and the counts' main residence. See Lück (1981), passim. It is also evident from the numbering of the reigning counts with the given name John. One John without regal number who ruled the County of Nassau-Dillenburg in the period 1303–1328, and eight counts by the name of John who ruled the County of Nassau-Siegen in the period 1362–1638.) (2 February 1418 – 11 October 1472), German: Maria Gräfin von Nassau-Siegen, official titles: Gräfin zu Nassau, Vianden und Diez, Frau zu Breda, was a countess from the House of Nassau-Siegen, a cadet branch of the Ottonian Line of the House of Nassau, and through marriage Countess of Nassau-Wiesbaden-Idstein.

== Biography ==
Mary was born on 2 February 1418 as the second daughter and fifth child of Count Engelbert I of Nassau-Siegen and his wife Lady Joanne of Polanen.

Mary got engaged on 6 January 1428 and married in Breda on 17 June 1437 to Count John of Nassau-Wiesbaden-Idstein (Note: In several sources he is called John II. As he was the only reigning count of Nassau-Wiesbaden-Idstein with the given name John, it is unclear why these sources add the regal number II.) (1419 – 9 May 1480). Both Mary and John descended from Count Henry II of Nassau, Mary through his son Otto I and John through his son Walram II. John had succeeded his father Adolf II as Count of Nassau-Wiesbaden-Idstein in 1426.

Mary came into conflict with her eldest brother Count John IV of Nassau-Siegen. She filed a complaint against her brother with Emperor Frederick III for forcibly removing her inheritance and goods. On 14 October 1463, the Emperor appointed Abbot Reinhard of Fulda as his attorney and instructed him to summon both parties to a trial on his behalf, to interrogate them and to give judgment. The abbot could – if necessary – examine witnesses and – if necessary – threaten these witnesses with punishment in order to force them to testify, as well as to carry out the proceedings in all respects in the event that one of the parties did not appear. The abbot summoned John by letter of 17 August 1464 to appear before him 45 days later in Salmünster. John received this summons on 2 September 1464 in Vianden from the hands of the servus et nuncius of the abbot.

The abbot's judgment is unknown, as is what happened next. However, on 7 July 1465, the Emperor informed Mary that John had appealed against the judgment by Archbishop John II of Trier unfavourable to him, and summoned her to appear before him on the 45th day after receipt of this summons or on the first day of the following court and informed her that, even if she did not appear, the trial would take place. What happened afterwards is also unclear. What is known is that the Emperor summoned John for the settlement of the inheritance dispute with his sister, because on 9 February 1467 Mary appointed attorneys for the trial. That is the last preserved record of the dispute.

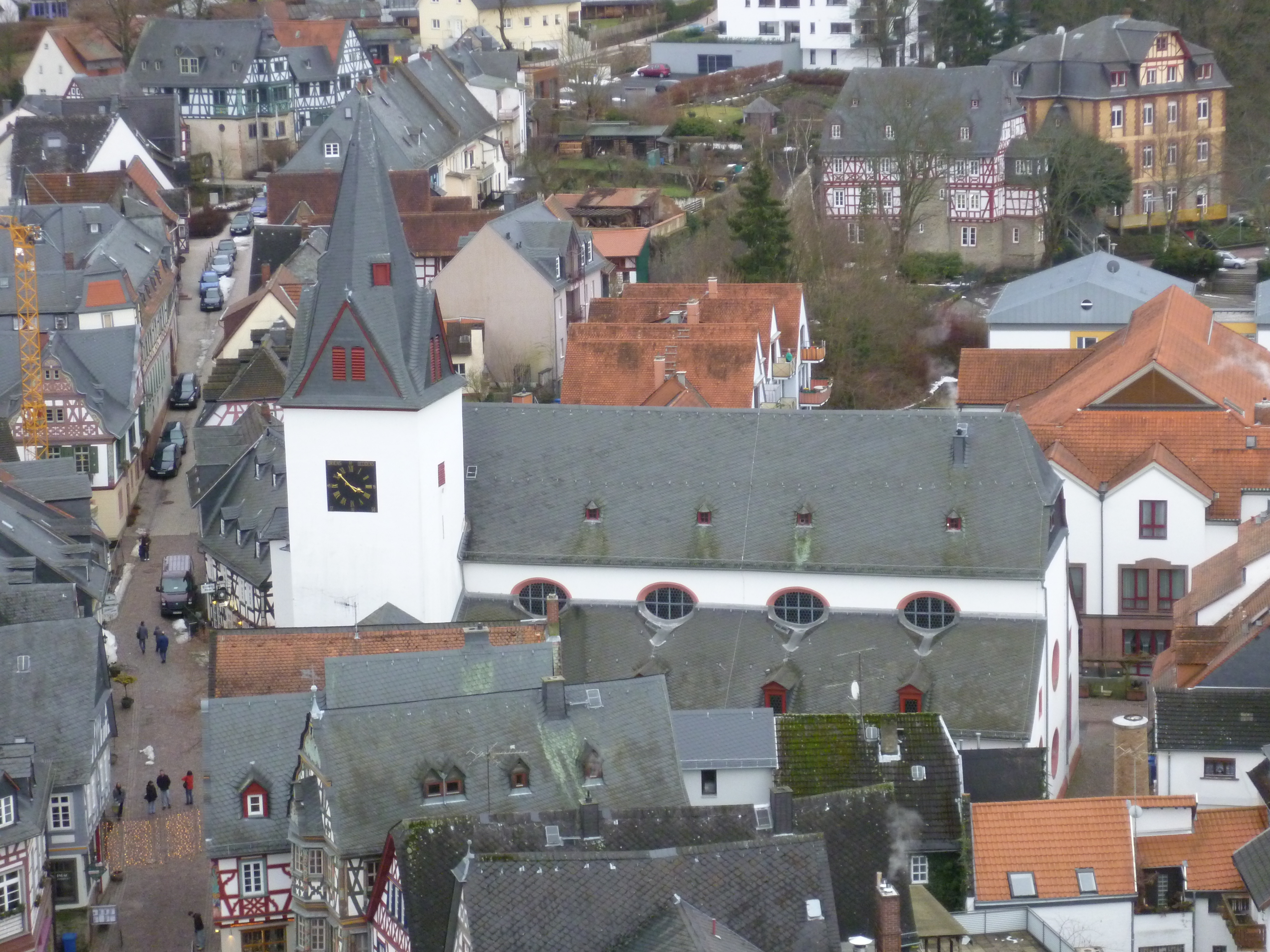
The Unionskirche in Idstein. Photo: Frank Winkelmann, 2011.

Mary died on 11 October 1472 and was buried in the Unionskirche in Idstein. The epitaph once placed in the choir for Mary and John, which probably disappeared when the church was rebuilt after 1660, showed the couple standing side by side. John wore the body armour typical for the time and a rosary instead of a sword, as well as a lance. To his right, Mary was depicted in a long robe, cloak, veil and holding a rosary. At the feet of both figures were their coats of arms, at the heads the crests. At the edge of the epitaph was the inscription:

'+ Anno d(omi)ni m cccc Ixxii / die ii me(n)s(i)s octobris o(biit) G(e)n(er)osa d(omi)na maria ac nassawe comitissa i(n) nassawe / c(uius) a(n)i(m)a req(ui)escat i(n) pace. Anno d(omi)ni m cccc / Ixxx die me(n)s(i)s ix may o(biit) nobil(is) ac gen(er)os(us) d(omi)n(us) Joh(anne)s Comes i(n) nassau d(omi)n(u)s i(n) Itstein et i(n) Wisbaden / cui(us) a(n)i(m)a req(ui)escat i(n) pace.'

All that remains of the epitaph is a drawing made by Heinrich Dors from his Epitaphienbuch, published in 1632.

== Issue ==
From the marriage of Mary and John the following children were born:

1. Mary (1438 – 14 January 1480), married on 25 May 1455 to Count Louis II of Isenburg-Büdingen (1422 – Büdingen, 4 June 1511).
2. John (1439 – 27 February 1482), was canon in Mainz en Liège.
3. Margaret (d. 27 May 1486), was Abbess of Klarenthal Abbey.
4. Anne (1442 – 1 March 1480), married in Mainz on 1 January 1464 to Count Otto II of Solms-Braunfels (22 November 1426 – 29 June 1504).
5. Count Adolf III (10 November 1443 – Wiesbaden, 6 July 1511), succeed his father as Count of Nassau-Wiesbaden in 1480. He married on 20 June 1484 to Countess Margaret of Hanau-Lichtenberg (15 May 1463 – 26 May 1504).
6. Bertha (1446 – 12 April ....), was Abbess of Klarenthal Abbey.
7. Engelbert (1448 – Mainz, 7 April 1508), was canon in Cologne and Mainz.
8. Count Philip (1450 – 16 June 1509), succeed his father as Count of Nassau-Idstein in 1480. He married in 1470 to Countess palatine Margaret of Zweibrücken (10 July 1456 – 7 September 1527).
9. Anne (d. 2 June ....), was a nun in Klarenthal Abbey.

== Ancestors ==
Ancestors of Mary of Nassau-Siegen
Great-great-grandparents	Henry I of Nassau-Siegen (c. 1270–1343) ⚭ before 1302; Adelaide of Heinsberg and Blankenberg (d. after 1343)	Philip II of Vianden (d. 1315/16) ⚭ Adelaide of Arnsberg (?–?)	Engelbert II of the Mark (d. 1328) ⚭ 1299; Matilda of Arberg (d. 1367)	Thierry VII of Cleves (1291–1347) ⚭ 1308; Margaret of Guelders and Zutphen (c. 1290–1331)	John I of Polanen (d. 1342) ⚭ Catherine of Brederode (1312/16–1372)	William VI of Horne (d. 1343) ⚭ 1315; Oda of Putten and Strijen (d. after 1327)	Simon I of Salm (d. 1346) ⚭ 1334; Mathilde of Saarbrücken (d. after 1354)	John of Valkenburg (d. 1356) ⚭ Mary of Herpen (d. after 1327)
Great-grandparents	Otto II of Nassau-Siegen (c. 1305–1350/51) ⚭ 1331; Adelaide of Vianden (d. 1376)		Adolf II of the Mark (d. 1347) ⚭ 1332; Margaret of Cleves (d. after 1348)		John II of Polanen (d. 1378) ⚭ 1348; Oda of Horne (d. before 1353)		John II of Salm (d. after 1400) ⚭ after 1355; Philippa of Valkenburg (?–?)	
Grandparents	John I of Nassau-Siegen (c. 1339–1416) ⚭ 1357; Margaret of the Mark (d. 1409)				John III of Polanen (d. 1394) ⚭ 1390; Odilia of Salm (d. 1428)			
Parents	Engelbert I of Nassau-Siegen (c. 1370–1442) ⚭ 1403; Joanne of Polanen (1392–1445)							

== Sources ==
- Dek, A.W.E. (1970). Genealogie van het Vorstenhuis Nassau (in Dutch). Zaltbommel: Europese Bibliotheek.
- Huberty, Michel; Giraud, Alain & Magdelaine, F. & B. (1981). l'Allemagne Dynastique (in French). Vol. Tome III: Brunswick-Nassau-Schwarzbourg. Le Perreux: Alain Giraud. ISBN 2-901138-03-9.
- Lück, Alfred (1981) [1967]. Siegerland und Nederland (in German) (2nd ed.). Siegen: Siegerländer Heimatverein e.V.
- Schutte, O. (1979). "Genealogische gegevens". In Tamse, C.A. (ed.). Nassau en Oranje in de Nederlandse geschiedenis (in Dutch). Alphen aan den Rijn: A.W. Sijthoff. pp. 40–44. ISBN 90-218-2447-7.
- Vorsterman van Oyen, A.A. (1882). Het vorstenhuis Oranje-Nassau. Van de vroegste tijden tot heden (in Dutch). Leiden & Utrecht: A.W. Sijthoff & J.L. Beijers.

Mary of Nassau-Siegen (1418–1472) House of Nassau-Siegen Born: 2 February 1418 Died: 11 October 1472
Regnal titles
Vacant Title last held by Margaret of Baden	Countess Consort of Nassau-Wiesbaden-Idstein; 17 June 1437 – 11 October 1472	Vacant Title next held by Margaret of Hanau-Lichtenberg
