= John IV of Nassau-Siegen =

German count (1410–1475)

John IV, Count of Nassau-Siegen
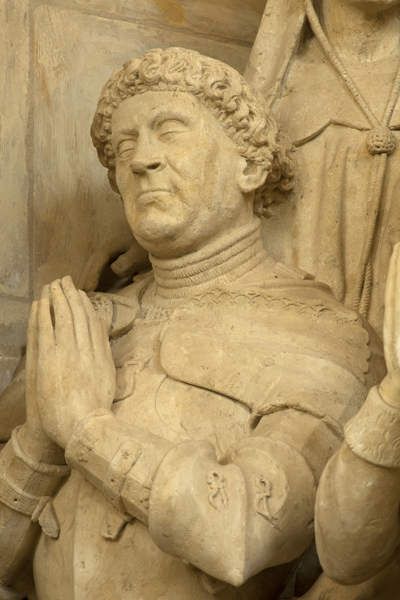
- Count John IV of Nassau-Siegen, detail of the epitaph in the Grote Kerk in Breda. Photo: Paul M.R. Maeyaert, 2011.

Count of Nassau-Siegen Count of Vianden Count of Diez Lord of Breda
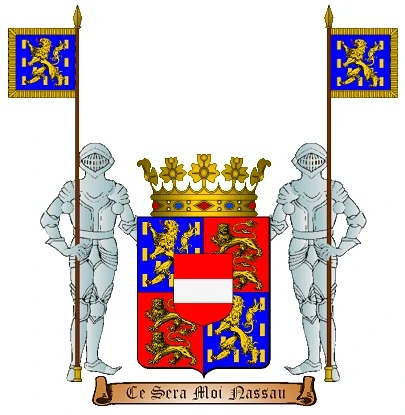
- Coat of arms
- Reign: 1442–1475
- Predecessor: Engelbert I
- Successor: Engelbert II (as Count of Vianden and Lord of Breda); John V (as Count of Nassau-Siegen and Count of Diez)
- Full name: John IV, Count of Nassau-Siegen
- Native name: Johann IV. Graf von Nassau-Siegen
- Born: Johann Graf zu Nassau, Vianden und Diez, Herr zu Breda; 1 August 1410; Breda Castle
- Died: 3 February 1475 (aged 64); Dillenburg
- Buried: Grote Kerk, Breda
- Noble family: House of Nassau-Siegen
- Spouse: Mary of Looz-Heinsberg
- Issue Detail: Anne; Joanne; Ottilie; Adriana; Engelbert II; John V
- Father: Engelbert I of Nassau-Siegen
- Mother: Joanne of Polanen

Count John IV of Nassau-Siegen (Note: In many sources he is called John IV of Nassau(-Dillenburg). His official titles were Count of Nassau, Vianden and Diez, Lord of Breda. It is incorrect to refer to him as the only reigning Count of Nassau, because the County of Nassau was divided into Nassau-Beilstein, Nassau-Siegen, Nassau-Weilburg and Nassau-Wiesbaden-Idstein. Furthermore, there was the cadet branch of Nassau-Saarbrücken, which ruled the County of Saarbrücken. John ruled the County of Nassau-Siegen, which is erroneously called Nassau-Dillenburg in many sources. See note 2.) (1 August 1410 – 3 February 1475), German: Johann IV. Graf von Nassau-Siegen, official titles: Graf zu Nassau, Vianden und Diez, Herr zu Breda, was since 1442 Count of Nassau-Siegen (Note: The County of Nassau-Siegen is erroneously called Nassau-Dillenburg in many sources. The county was not named after the small, unimportant city of Dillenburg, which did not even have a church at that time, but after the, for that time, large city of Siegen, the economic centre of the county and the counts' main residence. See Lück (1981), passim. It is also evident from the numbering of the reigning counts with the given name John. One John without regal number who ruled the County of Nassau-Dillenburg in the period 1303–1328, and eight counts by the name of John who ruled the County of Nassau-Siegen in the period 1362–1638.) (a part of the County of Nassau), of Vianden and of half Diez, and Lord of Breda and of the Lek. He descended from the Ottonian Line of the House of Nassau.

Since the death of his father, John owned many fiefs in the Netherlands, which he managed to expand. Through his marriage he obtained that many fiefs in the Duchy of Jülich, that he possessed 1/4 of that duchy. John was a loyal servant of the Dukes of Burgundy in the Netherlands, who was still called up for military service even when he was well into his fifties, but he was not one of the closest noble advisors. John can best be characterised as a wealthy nobleman who faithfully fought in the campaigns for which he was called up; he was not known for spectacular deeds or revolutionary ideas. The campaigns he took part in are therefore more typical of the politics of the Dukes of Burgundy than of his own preferences and interests. For the administration of justice, the County of Nassau-Siegen had a Schultheiß in most of the districts. The oldest preserved ordinance for the Schultheiß of the Dillenburg district is from John's reign. A not inconsiderable source of income for the Counts of Nassau-Siegen has always been the iron toll. A charter from John's reign concerning the tariffs lists the individual taxes in detail.

== Biography ==
John was born in Breda Castle (Note: Most of the sources do not mention a place of birth. Van Ditzhuyzen (2004), p. 151 states Dillenburg as place of birth, but that place of birth is very unlikely as his parents resided in the Netherlands in those days.) on 1 August 1410 as the eldest son of Count Engelbert I of Nassau-Siegen and Lady Joanne of Polanen.

In the period between his marriage and the death of his father, John lived in the house De Herberghe in the Reigerstraat in Breda.

John was interested in religion and science and owned a library in Breda Castle. This castle was his main residence in the Netherlands, from where he managed his domains located there.

=== In the service of the Dukes of Burgundy ===
John was a loyal servant of the Dukes of Burgundy, who was still called up for military service even when he was well into his fifties, but he was not one of the closest noble advisors of Philip the Good and Charles the Bold. Like his father, John was never admitted to the Order of the Golden Fleece. John can best be characterised as a wealthy nobleman who faithfully fought in the campaigns for which he was called up; he was not known for spectacular deeds or revolutionary ideas. The campaigns he took part in are therefore more typical of the politics of the Dukes of Burgundy than of his own preferences and interests.

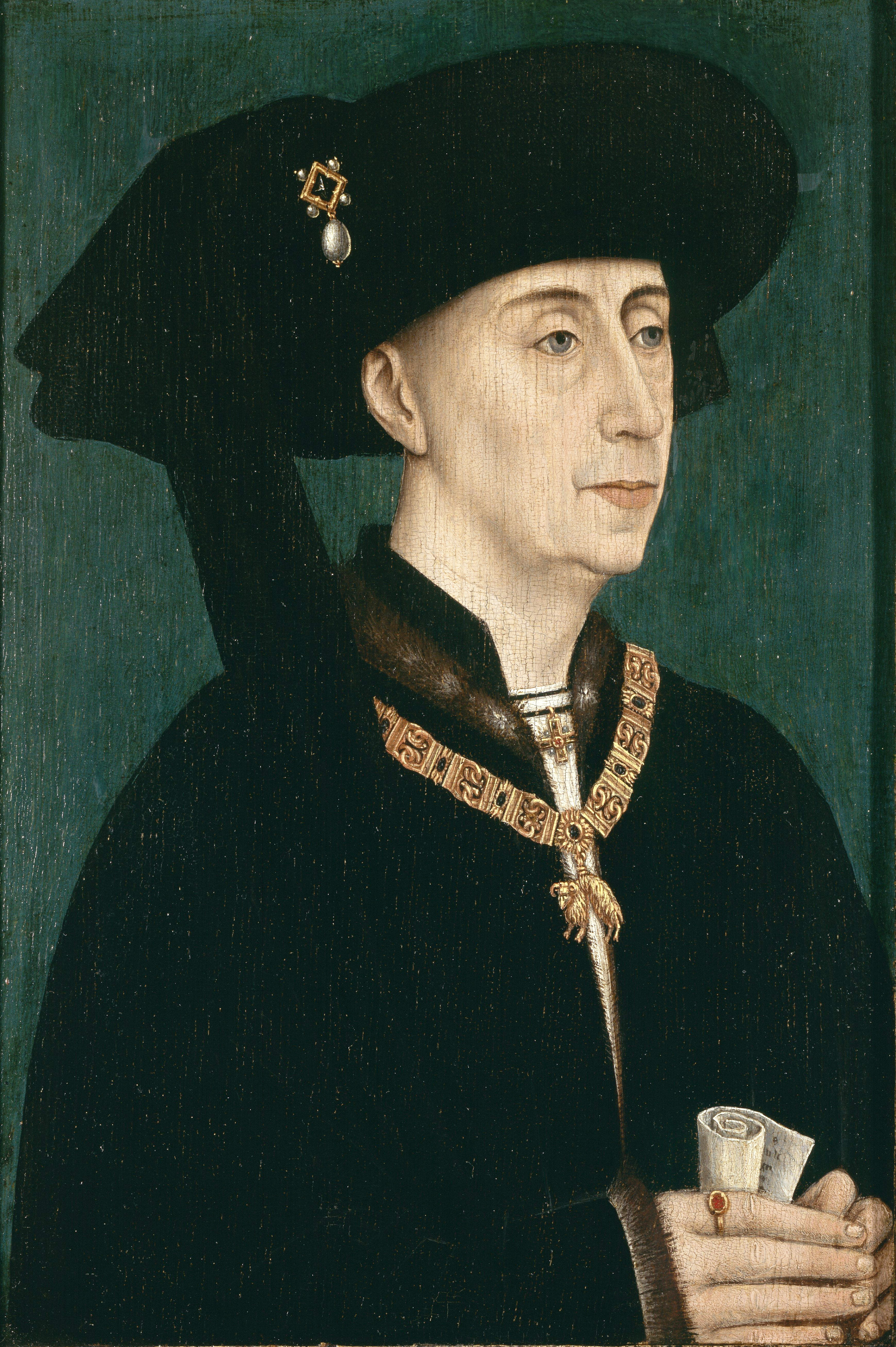
Philip the Good Duke of Burgundy. Portrait after Rogier van der Weyden, after 1450. Groeningemuseum, Bruges.

Philip the Good, who since 1430 had been Duke of Brabant and since 1433 Count of Holland, the countries in which John's father's possessions lay, appointed John already in 1435 or 1436 (Note: Van Ditzhuyzen (2004), p. 151, Dek (1970), p. 69, Blok (1911), p. 1218 and Vorsterman van Oyen (1882), p. 93 state the year 1436. Jansen (1979), p. 30 and Schutte (1979), p. 41 state the year 1435.) – so before the death of his father – as drost of Brabant. As drost, he was the highest judicial officer in the duchy who dealt with the cases that did not ressorted to a specific court. It was not a very politically sensitive office, although he could be assisted by archers on foot and horseback and received an annual payment of 600 Philippusguilders. John held this office until his death. In 1447 or 1448 John was also appointed drost (castellan) of the Land van Heusden. (Note: Van Ditzhuyzen (2004), p. 152 and Dek (1970), p. 69 state the year 1448. Schutte (1979), p. 41 and Vorsterman van Oyen (1882), p. 93 state the year 1447.)

Because of Philip the Good's interest in the Middle East, where his grandfather had suffered a grievous defeat at Nicopolis in 1396 that was still unreconciled, and the ever-increasing threat to Constantinople from the Ottoman Empire, John undertook a journey to the island of Rhodes on Philip's orders from May 1441 to February 1442, to see how the infidels could best be combated, but this led to nothing.

In the lands of Philip the Good there was still a lot of unrest, like in the County of Holland, where in the 1440s the struggle between the Hooks and Cods had flared up again. In 1445, Philip was obliged to personally put things in order and John was one of the commanders of the army. John is said to have advised to have the city councils consist of 50% Hooks and 50% Cods. This was not a bad idea, but later historians exaggerate when they say that this ended all unrest.

More dangerous for Philip was the rebellion of the Flemish city of Ghent, which wanted to maintain its autonomy undiminished, and opposed the centralising policy of the Dukes of Burgundy. In 1452 John was part of the army that had to force the rebellious city to obedience. Also the aspirations for autonomy of the city of Liège clashed with the system of government of the Dukes of Burgundy. Formally, Liège was not even part of the Burgundian territory, but in 1456 a nephew of Philip, Louis of Bourbon, was forcibly appointed Prince-Bishop of Liège. In the same year Philip's illegitimate son David of Burgundy was appointed Bishop of Utrecht. On both occasions, John was commander of the army that had to force the newly appointed shepherds to their faithful. The citizens of Utrecht accepted the inevitable for the time being, but in Liège the unrest remained for many years, until in 1465 it came to an armed outburst. Again, John was part of the army that had to subdue the city liberties and in the Battle of Montenaken he was the commander of the victorious army division. He was also present at the capture of Dinant in August 1466. Even during the reign of Charles the Bold, John still was, despite his advanced age, often in the field.

John's father had realised in time that the future lay with the Dukes of Burgundy; John drew the consequences and served the dukes faithfully, also by helping them to unscrupulously subdue city autonomy. This naturally benefited the position of his dynasty, from which his son Engelbert II and grandson Henry III were to benefit. They rose so high in the favour of the dukes that they could actively influence politics.

=== Count of Nassau-Siegen, Vianden and Diez ===
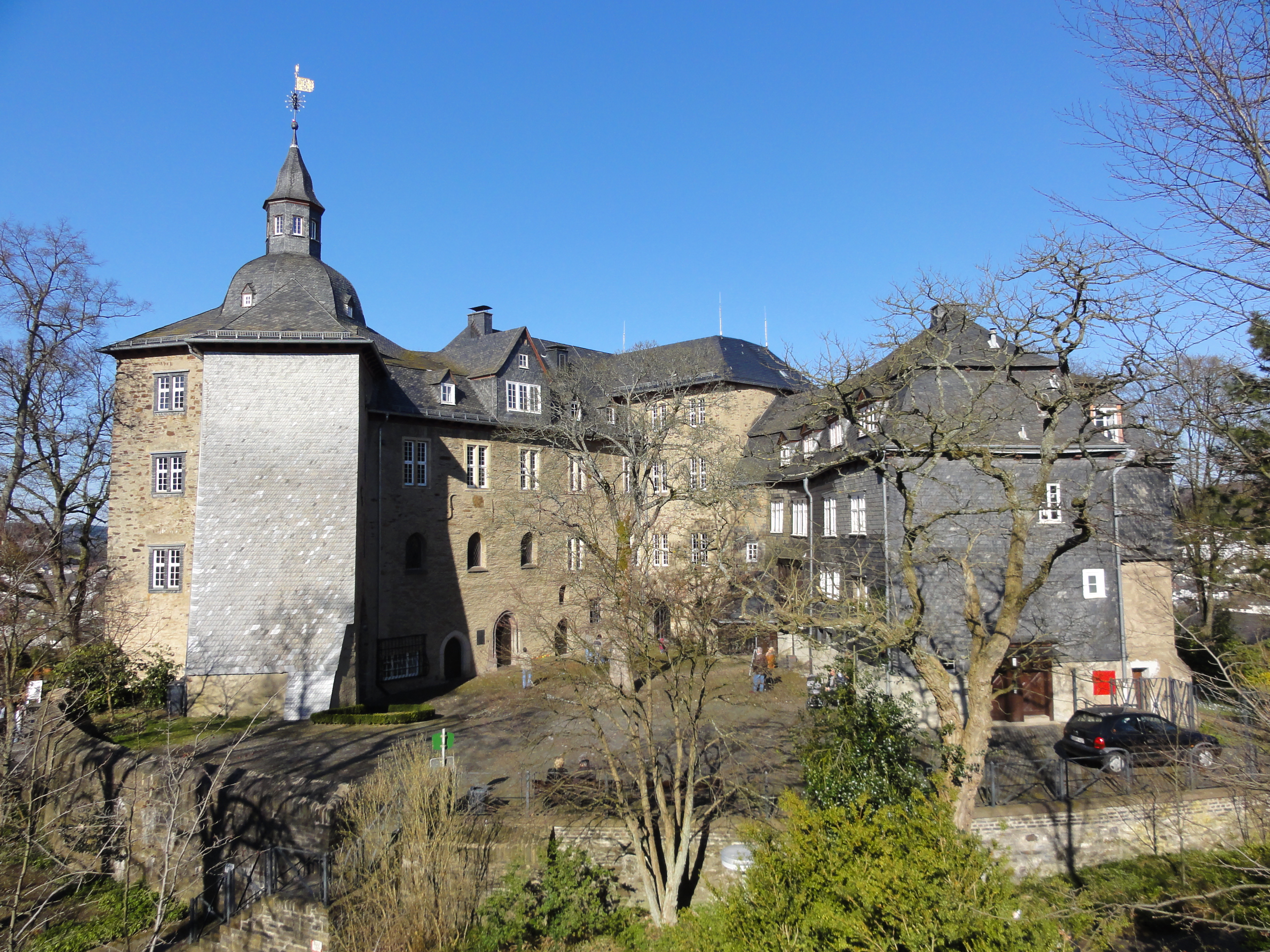
Siegen Castle, 2011.

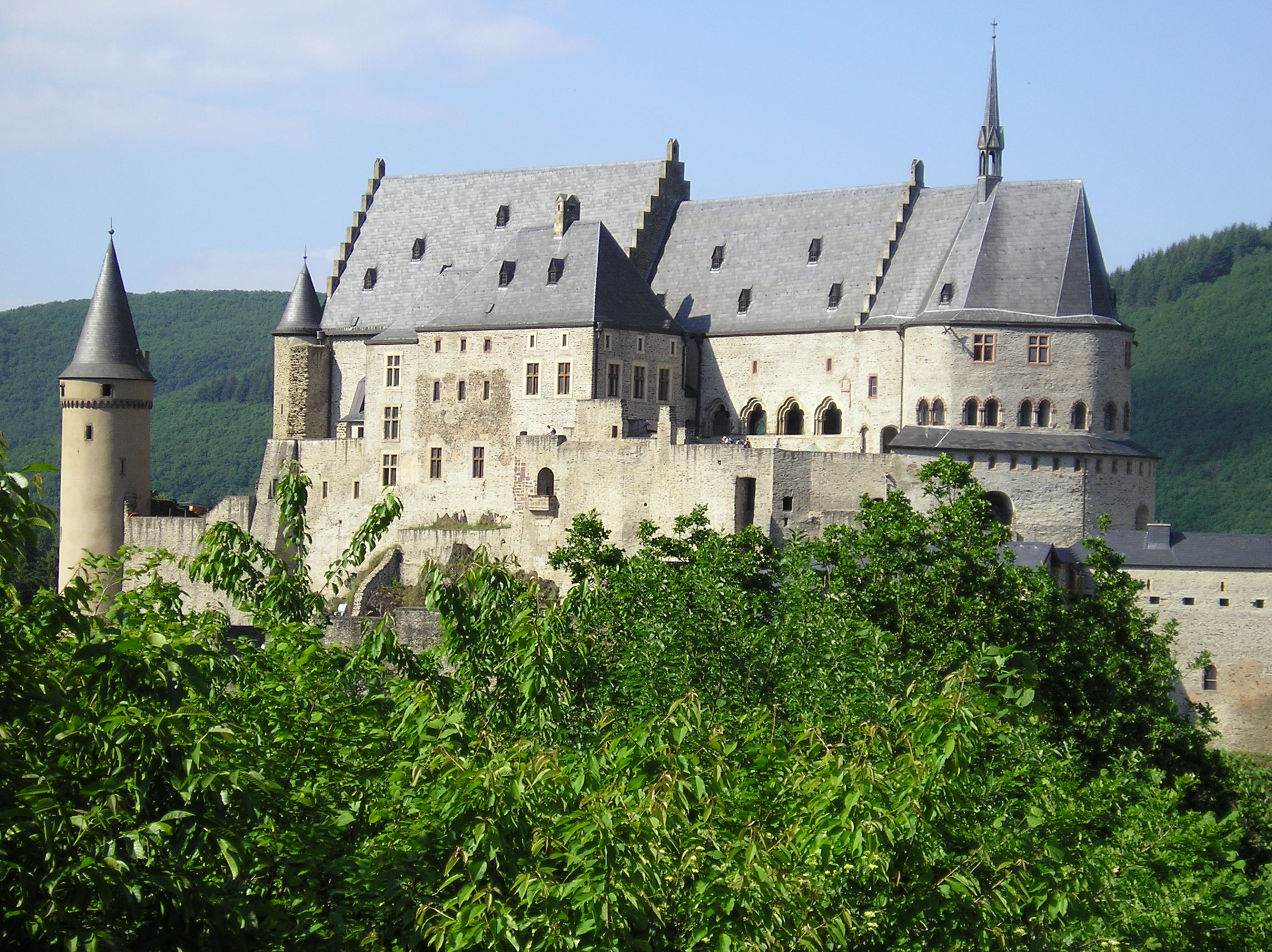
Vianden Castle. Photo: Vincent de Groot, 2004.

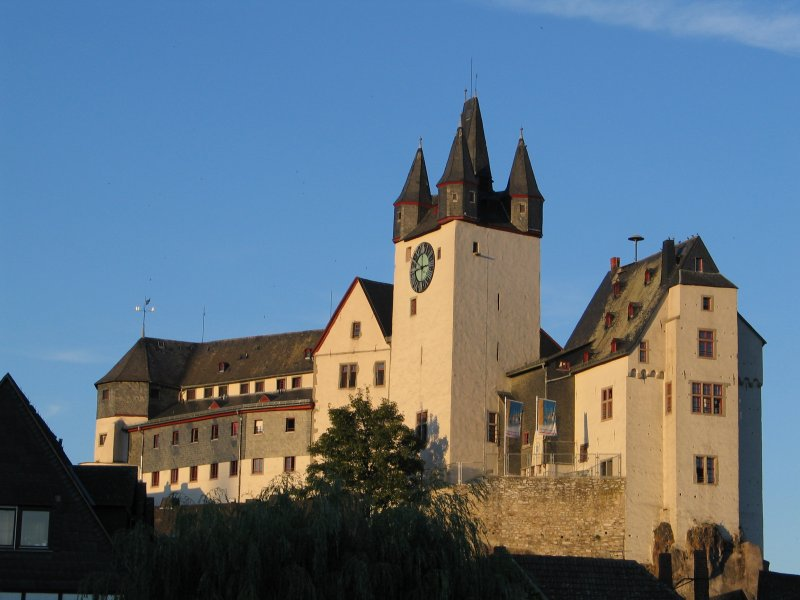
Diez Castle. Photo: Peter Klassen, 2006.

John succeeded his father in 1442 together with his brother Henry II. (Note: Van Ditzhuyzen (2004), p. 152 on the other hand, writes that John inherited all possessions of his father in 1442.) However, the County of Vianden had already been assigned to Henry by the marriage contract on 18 May 1415. John, his brother Henry and their distant cousin Count John I of Nassau-Beilstein were granted Greifenstein Castle as a fief and a part of the proceeds from the toll in Lahnstein by Roman King Frederick III in 1442. Together with his brother, John inherited the property of their uncle Count John II with the Helmet in May 1443. On 22 February 1447 John and his brother Henry divided their possessions, whereby John received the possessions in the Netherlands, 1/4 of the County of Vianden, as well as Herborn. The division treaty was signed in Cologne.

After the death of his brother in 1451, who had only one daughter, John inherited his brother's possessions and was granted the County of Diez as a fief by Archbishop James I of Trier on 4 November 1451. This put an end to the long-running dispute over that county between the archbishop and John's brother Henry. But this led to a conflict with his niece Ottilie of Nassau-Siegen, who also claimed her father part's of the County of Diez as her inheritance. (Note: The sources do not mention whether Ottilie also claimed her father's part of the County of Vianden.) The conflict was complicated further due to the fact that another part of the County of Diez belonged to Ottilie's father-in-law Count Philip the Elder of Katzenelnbogen.

John took part in the Soest Feud at the side of Archbishop Thierry II of Cologne, together with Count John I of Nassau-Beilstein, the latter's son Philip and brother Count Henry III of Nassau-Beilstein. Philip died in that feud in 1446. John received the office of Marshal of Westphalia (Note: Schutte (1979), p. 41, Dek (1970), p. 69 and Vorsterman van Oyen (1882), p. 93 state that John received this office in 1449 or 1450.) in gratitude from the archbishop, but exchanged it for pledged Rhine tolls in 1455. The Rhine tolls had always been an important concern for the Counts of Nassau, because the iron trade and the exchange of vital goods with the Netherlands took place over the Rhine.

Approximately midway between their possessions in the Netherlands and their counties in Germany the Counts of Nassau owned a house in the city of Cologne (das achte Haus von der Goltgassenecken nach St. Cunibert hin), which made the connection between the two areas easier for them. His widespread possessions forced John to travel constantly, in order to govern his possessions well. When John was in his county, he governed it from Siegen or Dillenburg. The increasing citizenry in the city of Siegen was a thorn in John's side, but he did not succeed in enforcing any special rights there. Siegen's city privileges were co-granted by John's ancestor Count Henry I of Nassau-Siegen in 1303.

The County of Nassau-Siegen was divided into districts (Ämter). In each district (Amt) the count appointed an Amtmann. These were members of the local nobility and deputised for the count. They had a number of servants to guard the public order. In times of war they formed the core of the army. Because of John's sometimes long absences, these Amtmänner had unlimited power. One of these was Philipp von Bicken, appointed by John. During John's long absence, however, von Bicken used the trust placed in him and his own power base in the Haiger Mark to repeatedly overstep his authority, to such an extent that he arrogated territorial lord rights to himself, in order to increase his family's still very considerable possessions. He fell into disfavour with John in 1466 and von Bicken fled the county and put himself under Hessian protection. It was not until 1486 that John's son John V was able to definitively subjugate the von Bicken Family.

For the administration of justice, the county had a Schultheiß in most of the districts. The oldest preserved ordinance for the Schultheiß of the Dillenburg district is from 10 April 1465, which contains only a part of his tasks and authority. In this ordinance the provisions on matrimonial law are prominently present. The Reichshofgericht in Rottweil was competent for appeals. For the Blutgerichtsbarkeit (high jurisdiction) the Hochgericht was competent. The Ebersbach district had its own Hochgericht auf dem Stein. During the executions there, the count occasionally wielded the sword himself in order to behead the criminals. But mostly he left that to the executioners. Also the other punishments and fines, which the count himself imposed in special cases, to give an example, were not insignificant for the monetary value of the time.

When the count's family started staying in the county more often, a court was established. The financial administration was still relatively simple; there was no distinction between the public and the private treasury of the count. All income flowed into the private treasury of the count. The count received the revenues from the farms in the villages in kind, which were supplied by the serfs working there. With the increase in coinage, which resulted in payments in kind being increasingly replaced by payments in money, the office of Rentmeister became more and more important. The count's fixed income included the Mai und Herbst Bede, which were levied on land tenure. There was also the Leibbede, a personal tax, which was levied when the serf died and had to be paid by his relatives. This originally consisted of the best piece of livestock, but was later replaced by a sum of money. Finally, there was a hearth tax, which had to be paid during Lent. The irregular revenues of the count included first of all the so-called Schatzungen, taxes for special expenses and emergencies. Then there was the income from tolls, which were often leased to subjects. This also applied to fishing rights, which the count owned. Taxes were also levied in the cities, on houses, gardens, fields and meadows. A not inconsiderable source of income for the Counts of Nassau has always been the iron toll. A charter of 1 April 1470 concerning the tariffs in Siegen, Netphen and Wilnsdorf lists the individual taxes for pig iron, steel, cast iron pans, metal sheets, scythes, cauldrons, etc. in detail. The expenses included the travels of the count and his family, celebrations at court, the remuneration of officials, court clothes, altar candles and communion wine, but especially the workmen and materials for construction work at the various castles. John had Dillenburg Castle – which until then had been used primarily as a stronghold against the unruly local nobility – extended in the period 1453–1467 and rebuilt into a residential castle for the count's family. And in 1472 he started the expansion of Tringenstein Castle, which lasted until 1481.

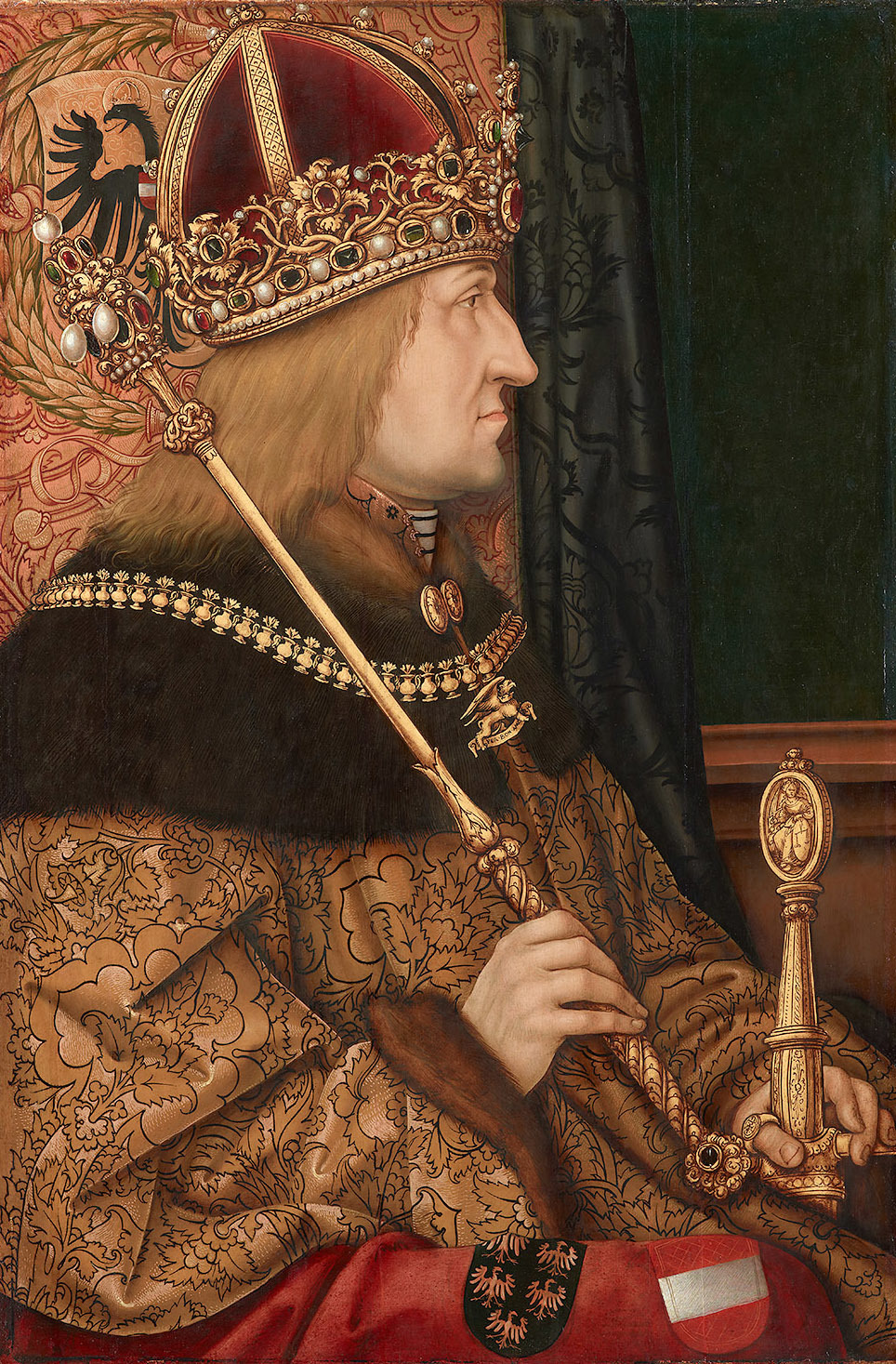
Emperor Frederick III. Attributed to Hans Burgkmair, c. 1500. Kunsthistorisches Museum, Vienna.

On 28 May 1470, Emperor Frederick III confirmed and granted John permission to purchase rights to the toll in Königsdorf and the associated tolls in Mülheim, Brück, Lövenich, Widdersdorf, Bocklemünd, Merheim and Blatzheim, as well as other rights from the Archdiocese of Cologne. The late Archbishop Thierry II had transferred these tolls and rights to John, with the approval of the Chapter, as compensation for the losses caused by the Archbishop and the Archdiocese. This was evident to the Emperor from the copies of four charters signed by Thierry, which were presented to him, granting John the rights to these tolls and rights, which he still owned and had been using up until then, for the unhindered use of himself and his heirs.

John was one of the princes ordered by the Emperor on 12 June 1470 to wage war against Count palatine Frederick I. John had the confidence of the Emperor. This is shown by the fact that in 1472 the Emperor ordered John to question witnesses as his commissioner in the lawsuit in the Kammergericht between the citizens of Nauborn and the city of Wetzlar. In a summons to the Schöffen of Wetzlar – sent by Count Philip II of Nassau-Weilburg with John's letter of attorney – the hearings are mentioned to take place on 12 October in Siegen. And on 30 June 1474, the Emperor informed the mayors and the city council of Cologne that he would soon pay off part of his debt of 2,000 Rhenish guilders by having John pay them the sum of 600 guilders.

John also seems to have been on the best of terms with the church. In any case, he received a so-called Butterbrief from Pope Sixtus IV (dated Rome 25 February 1472), which allowed the inhabitants of his cities and castles to consume butter during Lent, and milk food – apart from cheese – instead of oil, because they lived in a cold region, where no olive oil grew and hardly any fish was available.

=== Expansion of his possessions in the Netherlands ===
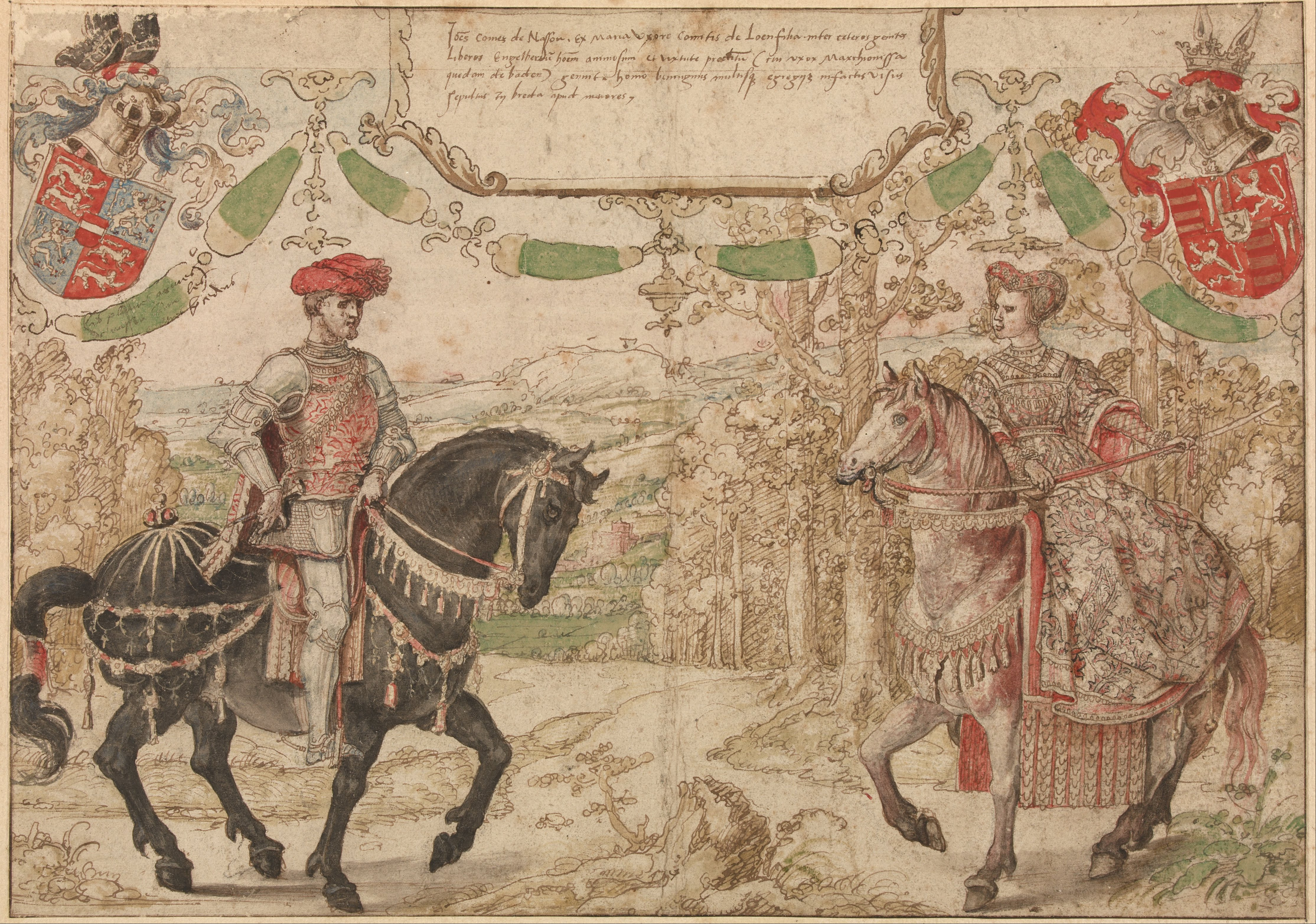
Count John IV of Nassau-Siegen and his wife Lady Mary of Looz-Heinsberg. Design drawing by Bernard van Orley for the tapestry series with the genealogy of the House of Nassau, 1528–1530. Getty Center, Los Angeles.

In the Netherlands, since the death of his father, John owned the heerlijkheid of Breda, Geertruidenberg, Klundert (or Niervaart), Oosterhout and Dongen, a house on the Koudenberg in Brussels (later called the Palace of Nassau), a house in Mechelen, the heerlijkheid of the Lek, Monster and Polanen, Zundert and Nispen, and the heerlijkheid of Drimmelen. On 27 February 1458, John bought the heerlijkheden of Gageldonk and Hambroeck. In the same year he acquired Steenbergen by the division of the joint ownership of that heerlijkheid between Lord of Breda and the Lord of Strijen. He freed the heerlijkheid of Breda from the feudal ties to the Margraviate of Antwerp and brought it directly under the Duchy of Brabant. He also increased the liberties of the city of Breda.

Through his marriage to Lady Mary of Looz-Heinsberg, John obtained the heerlijkheden of Herstal, Vught, Gangelt, Waldfeucht and the Land of Millen, so that he possessed 1/4 of the Duchy of Jülich. (Note: Strinkingly Jansen (1979), p. 31 states that what Mary was bringing in, was quite modest.) This led to a dispute with his distant relative Count John II of Nassau-Saarbrücken, who was married to Lady Jeanne of Looz-Heinsberg, the daughter and heiress of Lord John IV of Looz-Heinsberg.

At John's request, Emperor Frederick III declared on 28 May 1470 that by granting the entire Duchy of Jülich to Duke Gerhard VII, the claims of Philippa of Looz-Heinsberg and her sister Mary, John's wife, were not to be affected. Apparently this had no effect, because in 1471 or 1472 the Emperor ordered Duke Charles the Bold of Burgundy to settle on his behalf the dispute between Gerhard on the one hand and John and his wife Mary on the other. The dispute became more complicated when in 1472 Gerhard VII's son William married to Countess Elisabeth of Nassau-Saarbrücken, John II's eldest daughter, who had inherited her mother's possessions. In 1474, the Emperor withdrew the order to Charles the Bold and instead transferred the matter to Archbishop John II of Trier. The dispute was only settled when on 25 August 1499 John's eldest son Engelbert II transferred his half of the castle and the land of Millen with the towns of Gangelt and Vught to Duke William of Jülich and Berg and received in exchange from the latter on 27 August 1499 the city and the land of Diest and the castle and the land of Zichem and Zeelhem.

=== Dispute with his sister ===
John came into conflict with his sister Mary. She filed a complaint against her brother with Emperor Frederick III for forcibly removing her inheritance and goods. On 14 October 1463, the Emperor appointed Abbot Reinhard of Fulda as his attorney and instructed him to summon both parties to a trial on his behalf, to interrogate them and to give judgment. The abbot could – if necessary – examine witnesses and – if necessary – threaten these witnesses with punishment in order to force them to testify, as well as to carry out the proceedings in all respects in the event that one of the parties did not appear. The abbot summoned John by letter of 17 August 1464 to appear before him 45 days later in Salmünster. John received this summons on 2 September 1464 in Vianden from the hands of the servus et nuncius of the abbot.

The abbot's judgment is unknown, as is what happened next. However, on 7 July 1465, the Emperor informed Mary that John had appealed against the judgment by Archbishop John II of Trier unfavourable to him, and summoned her to appear before him on the 45th day after receipt of this summons or on the first day of the following court and informed her that, even if she did not appear, the trial would take place. What happened afterwards is also unclear. What is known is that the Emperor summoned John for the settlement of the inheritance dispute with his sister, because on 9 February 1467 Mary appointed attorneys for the trial. That is the last preserved record of the dispute.

=== Last years, death, funeral and succession ===
John signed an inheritance treaty with his sons on 4 May 1472, in which it was decided to divide the possessions after John's death. The eldest son, Engelbert, would get the possessions in the Netherlands, while the youngest son, John, would get the possessions right of the River Rhine (Nassau-Siegen and Diez).

John died in Dillenburg on 3 February 1475 and was buried under the epitaph in the Grote Kerk in Breda. (Note: The sources do not mention a date of burial. Only Van der Aa (1860), p. 87 states that the funeral took place on 13 February. However, ten days does not seem to be enough to firstly transfer the body from Dillenburg to Breda and secondly for the guests to arrive in time for the funeral.) His heart was interred in the church in Feldbach and transferred to the Evangelische Stadtkirche in Dillenburg around 1495, where the epitaph made in 1479 with the inscription hie liegt des edeln und wolgeboren Johan graven czu Nassaw czu Dietz czu Vianden her czu Breda sin herz begraben dem Got genedig sie. Obiit anno domini MCCCCXXV of sant Blasius tag 1479 can still be seen. He was succeeded by his sons Engelbert II and John V in accordance with the division treaty of 1472.

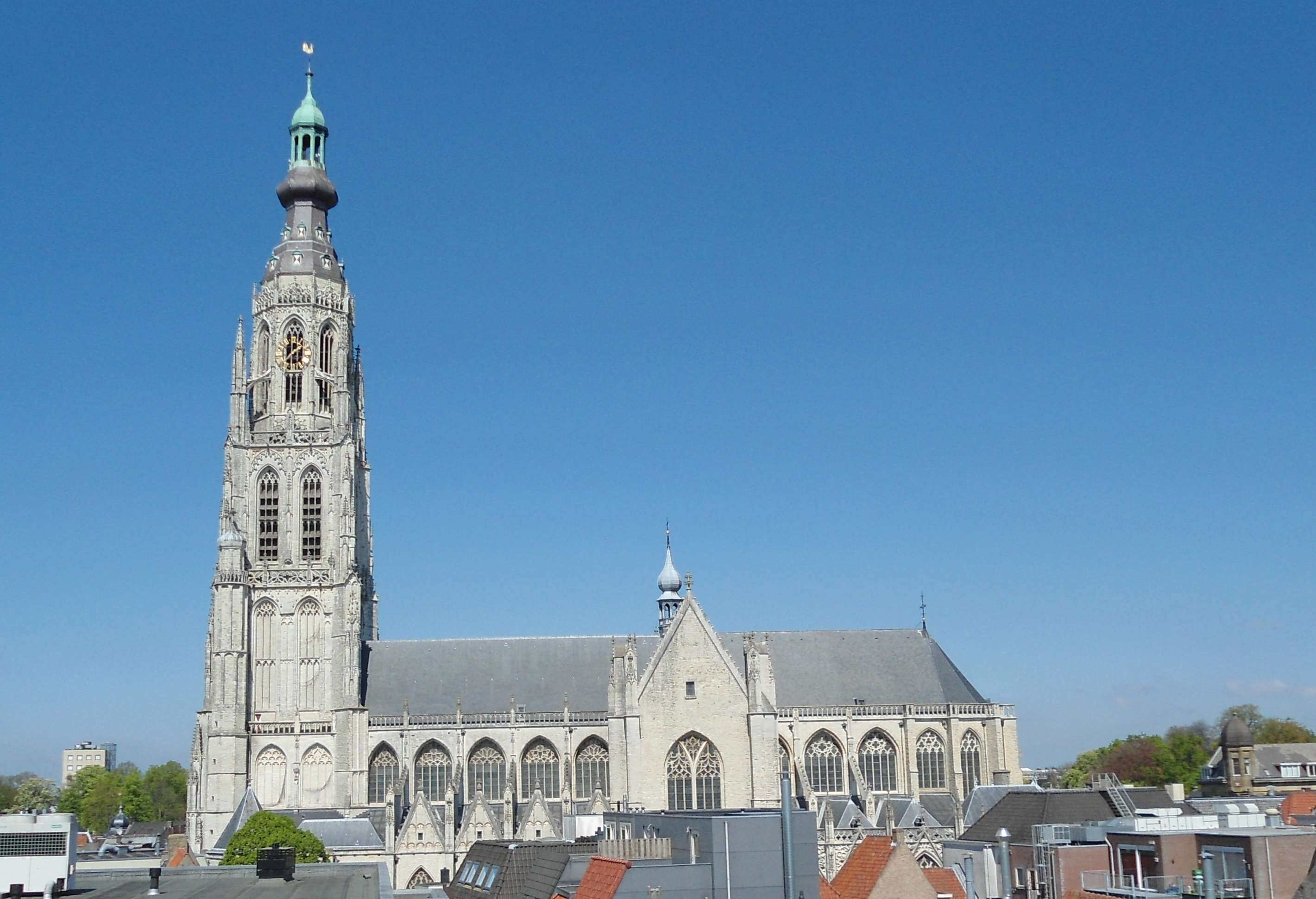
The Grote Kerk in Breda, 2012.

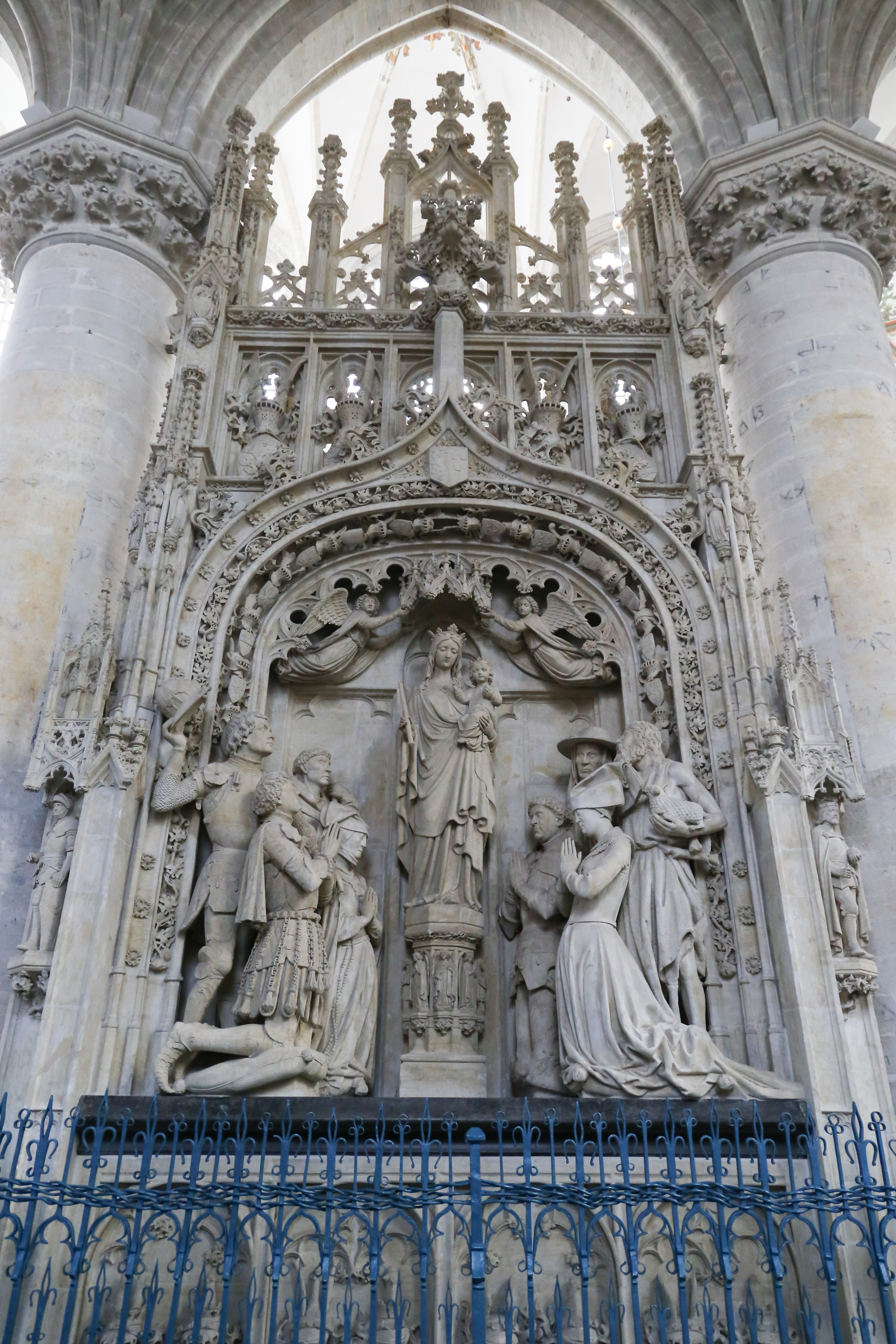
The epitaph for Engelbert I and John IV of Nassau-Siegen in the Grote Kerk in Breda. Photo: Richard Broekhuijzen, 2017.

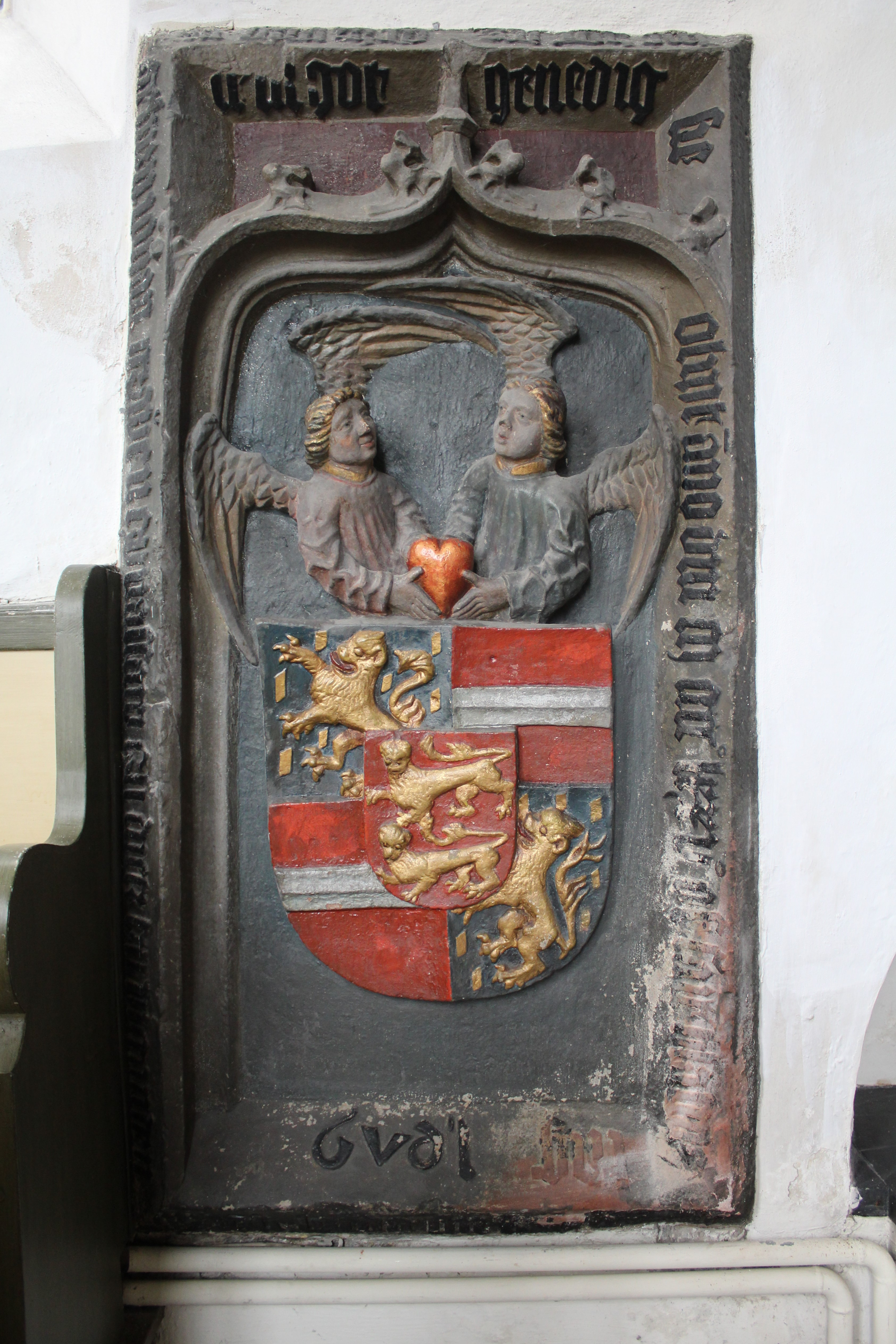
The epitaph for the heart of John IV in the Evangelische Stadtkirche in Dillenburg, 2019.

== Marriage and issue ==
John married on 7 February 1440 (Note: The sources do not mention a place of marriage. Van Ditzhuyzen (2004), p. 151 states the date of marriage 7/17 February 1440.) to Lady Mary of Looz-Heinsberg (1424 (Note: Van Ditzhuyzen (2004), p. 151, however, states 1426 as her year of birth. That year of birth is unlikely, as it would mean that she married at the age of thirteen or fourteen, and that she gave birth to her first child at the age of fourteen or fifteen.) – Siegen, 20 April 1502), the eldest daughter of Lord John II of Looz-Heinsberg and his second wife Countess Anne of Solms.

From the marriage of John and Mary the following children were born: (Note: The second daughter from this marriage, Joanne, is not mentioned by Vorsterman van Oyen (1882) and Textor von Haiger, Johann (1617). Nassauische Chronik. In welcher des vralt, hochlöblich, vnd weitberühmten Stamms vom Hause Naßaw, Printzen vnd Graven Genealogi oder Stammbaum: deren geburt, leben, heurath, kinder, zu Friden- vnd Kriegszeiten verzichtete sachen und thaten, absterben, und sonst denckwürdige Geschichten. Sampt einer kurtzen general Nassoviae und special Beschreibung der Graf- und Herschaften Naßaw-Catzenelnbogen, etc (in German). Herborn: Christoph Raab.)

1. Anne (1440 or 1441 (Note: Katzenelnbogen, Anna Gräfin von states that she was born in Dillenburg. That is very unlikely as her parents resided in Breda at that time according to Van Ditzhuyzen (2004), p. 152.) – Celle, 5 or 8 April 1514 (Note: The date of death 8 April 1514 in Dek (1970), p. 69, and 5 April 1514 in Vorsterman van Oyen (1882), p. 94, and Katzenelnbogen, Anna Gräfin von.)), married:
  1. on 28 October 1467 to Duke Otto II the Victorious of Brunswick-Lüneburg (1439 – January 1471 (Note: The date of death 8 or 19 January 1471 in Schutte (1979), p. 41, 8 January 1471 in Dek (1970), p. 69, 19 January 1471 in Vorsterman van Oyen (1882), p. 94, and 17 January 1471 in Spehr, Ferdinand (1880). "Heinrich der Mittlere, Herzog von Braunschweig-Lüneburg". Allgemeine Deutsche Biographie (in German). Vol. Band 11. Leipzig: Duncker & Humblot. p. 492.));
  2. on 24 January 1474 to Count Philip the Elder of Katzenelnbogen (1402 – 28 July 1479 (Note: The date of death 27 or 28 July 1479 in Schutte (1979), p. 41, and 27 June 1479 in Vorsterman van Oyen (1882), p. 94.)).
2. Joanne (1444 – May 1468), married on 14 October 1464 to Count Philip I of Waldeck-Waldeck (1445 – 1475).
3. Ottilie (c. 1445 (Note: Schutte (1979), p. 42, Dek (1970), p. 70, and Vorsterman van Oyen (1882), p. 95 mention Ottilie as the youngest daughter, without mentioning a date of birth, born after her brother John, who was born in 1455. Ottilie being born after 1455 seems to be unlikely as she was already mentioned as a nun to reform a convent in 1463. The year of birth c. 1445 in Ruizendaal, Willem & Conrads, Marian (1995). Nassau & Oranje. 600 jaar geschiedenis van ons vorstenhuis. Van Engelbert I tot Willem-Alexander (in Dutch). Baarn: BV Uitgeversmaatschappij Tirion. p. 37. ISBN 90-5121-548-7.) – Alkmaar, 22 April 1495). Was a nun in the Bethany Abbey near Mechelen until 1463 and then in the Saint Catherinadal Abbey in Breda 1463–1476. She was the first prioress of Vredenburg Abbey in Bavel 1476–1495.
4. Adriana (Breda, 7 February 1449 – 15 January 1477 (Note: The date of death 11 or 15 June 1477 in Schutte (1979), p. 42, and 11 June 1477 in Vorsterman van Oyen (1882), p. 94.)), married on 12 September 1468 to Count Philip I of Hanau-Münzenberg (21 September 1449 – 26 August 1500).
5. Count Engelbert II the Illustrious (Breda, 17 May 1451 – Brussels, 31 May 1504), succeeded his father in the possessions in the Netherlands. Married in Koblenz on 19 December 1468 to Margravine Cimburga of Baden (15 May 1450 – Breda, 5 July 1501).
6. Count John V (Breda, 9 November 1455 – Dillenburg or Siegen, (Note: Schutte (1979), p. 42 and Dek (1970), p. 70 state Dillenburg as place of death, and Vorsterman van Oyen (1882), p. 95 states Dillenburg Castle. Assman & Menk (1996), however, state Siegen Castle as place of death and Joachim (1881), p. 253 states Siegen.) 30 July 1516), succeeded his father in Nassau-Siegen and Diez. Married in Marburg on 11 February 1482 to Landgravine Elisabeth of Hesse-Marburg (Marburg, May 1466 – Cologne, 17 January 1523 (Note: Schutte (1979), p. 42 states the date 7 or 17 January 1523.)).
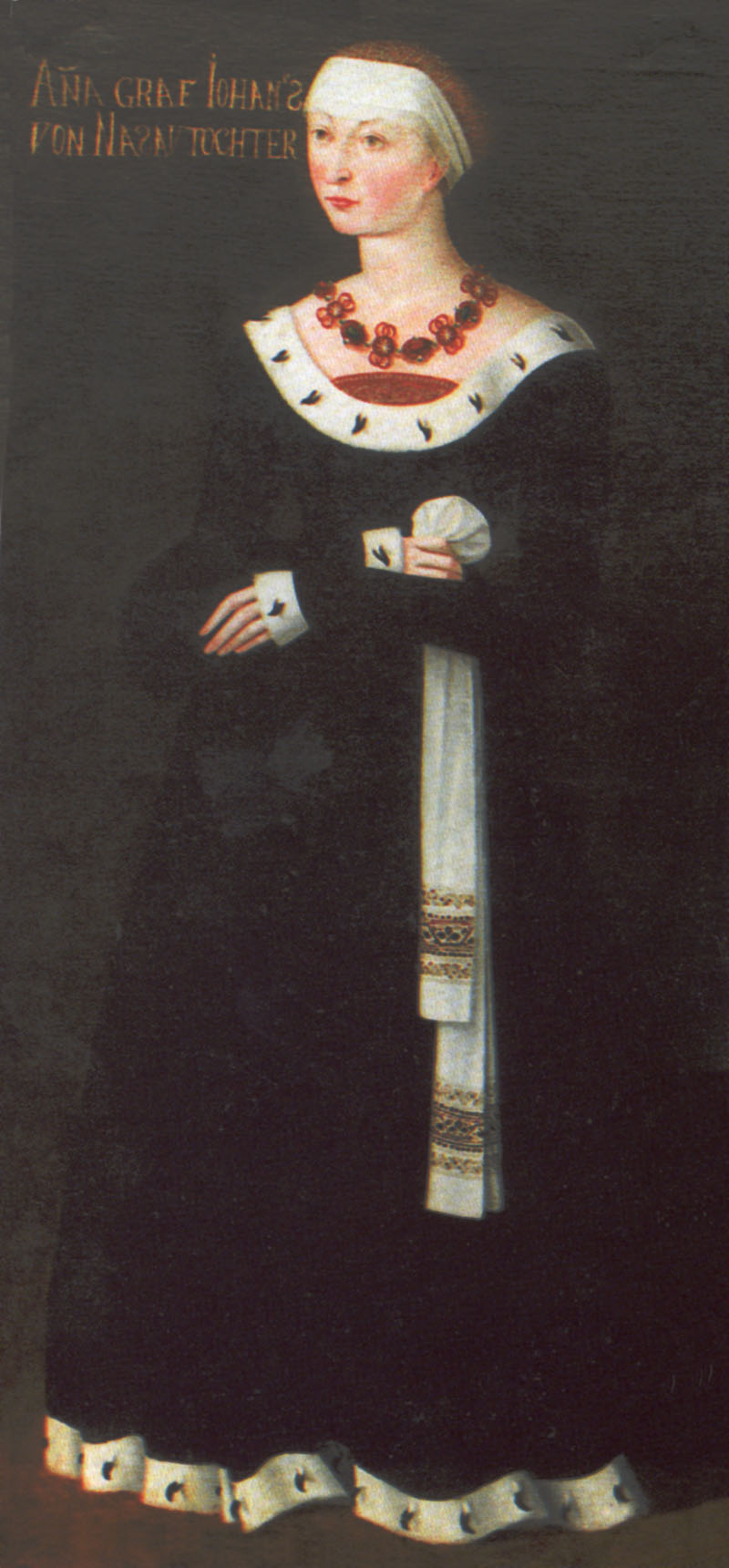
Anne of Nassau-Siegen (1440/41–1514). Anonymous portrait, c. 1460.

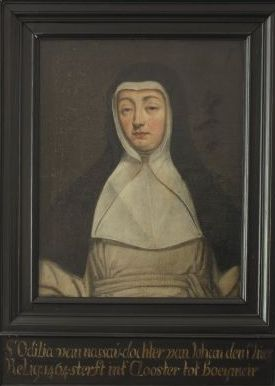
Ottilie of Nassau-Siegen (c. 1445–1495). Portrait by master Sommeren, 1681. Saint Catharinadal Abbey, Oosterhout.

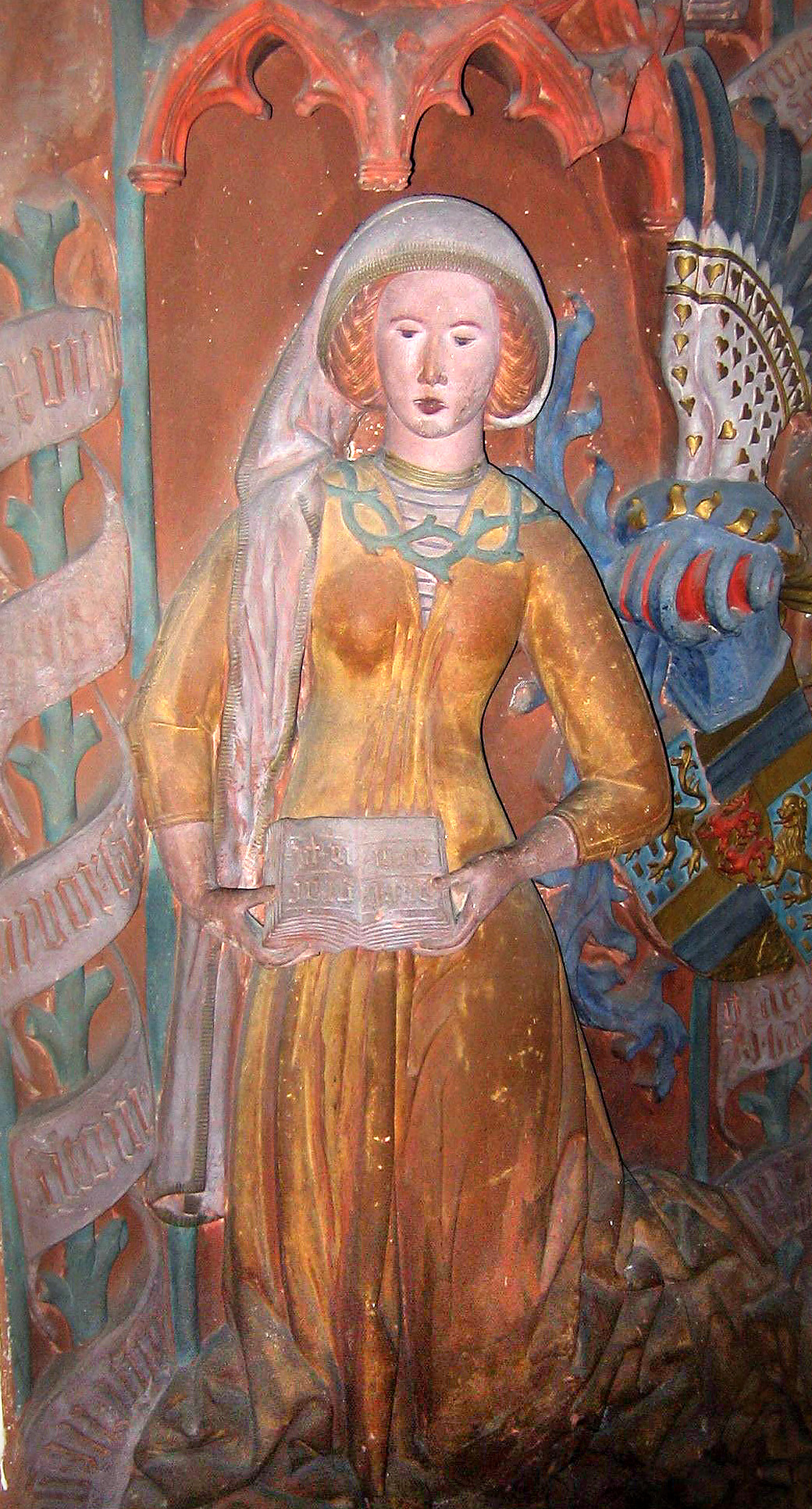
Epitaph of Adriana of Nassau-Siegen (1449–1477). Marienkirche, Hanau. Photo: Reinhard Dietrich, 2009.

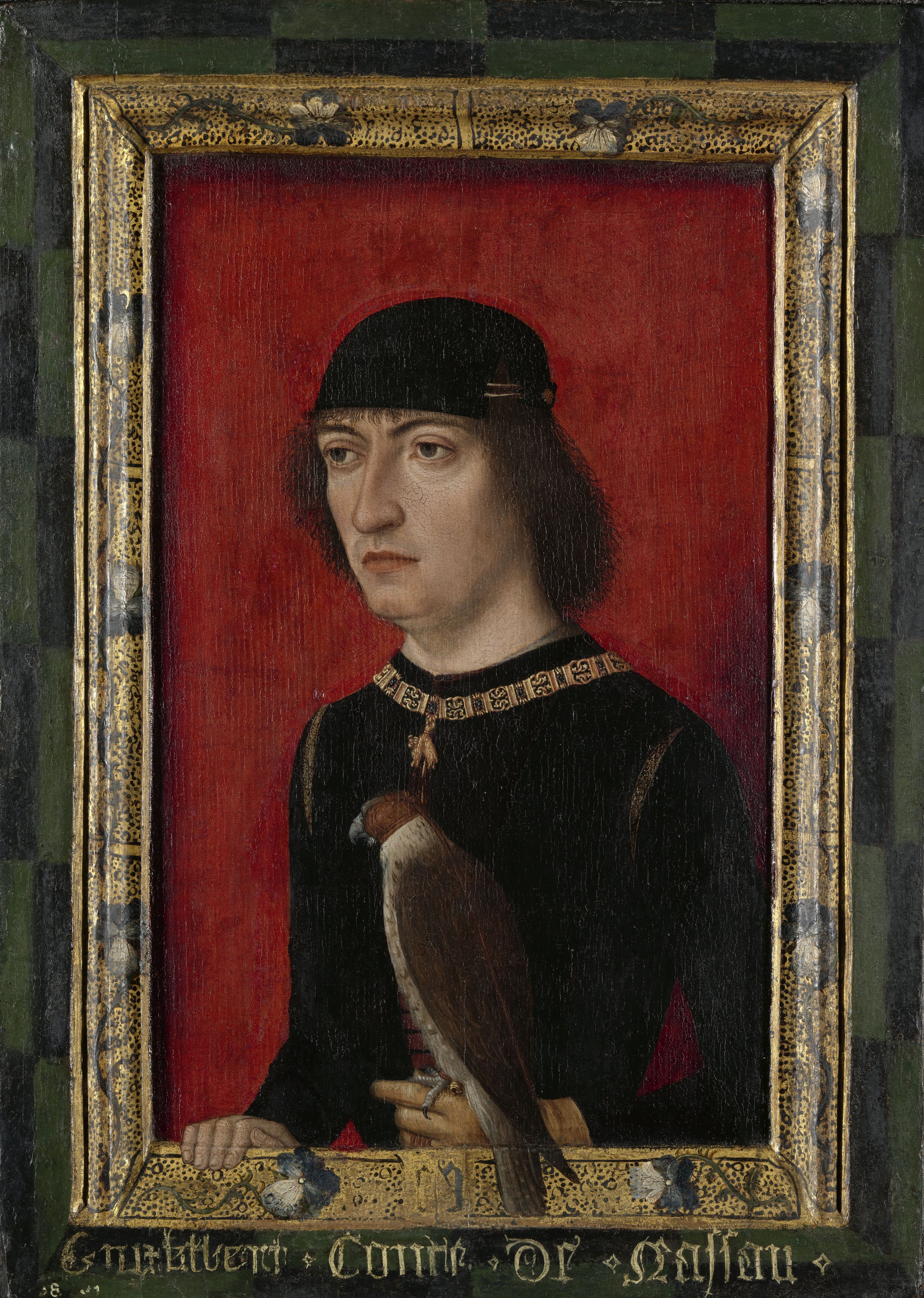
Count Engelbert II the Illustrious of Nassau-Breda (1451–1504). Portrait by the Master of Portraits of Princes, 1487. Rijksmuseum, Amsterdam.

=== Illegitimate children ===
John had two illegitimate children:

1. Jan van Nassau (d. 29 November 1506), castellan of Heusden Castle. Son of Aleid van Loemel. Was granted the castles and heerlijkheden Corroy and Frasne as a fief on 29 April 1485, after he had bought it from his halfbrother Engelbert II. In 1492, however, these properties reverted to Engelbert II. He married (marriage contract Loon op Zand, 4 November 1470) to Adriana van Haastrecht (d. 8 October 1512). Jan van Nassau was the progenitor of the illegitimate cadet branch van Nassau van Merwen.
2. Adriaan van Nassau. Bought Thommes and Auimel in 1469. On 7 October 1509 he still received 100 guilders annually from the Rentamt of St. Vith. He married Katharina von Brandscheid, Lady of Reinhardstein. Adriaan van Nassau was the progenitor of the illegitimate cadet branch Nassau-Reinhardstein.

== Ancestors ==
Ancestors of Count John IV of Nassau-Siegen
Great-great-grandparents	Henry I of Nassau-Siegen (c. 1270–1343) ⚭ before 1302; Adelaide of Heinsberg and Blankenberg (d. after 1343)	Philip II of Vianden (d. 1315/16) ⚭ Adelaide of Arnsberg (?–?)	Engelbert II of the Mark (d. 1328) ⚭ 1299; Matilda of Arberg (d. 1367)	Thierry VII of Cleves (1291–1347) ⚭ 1308; Margaret of Guelders and Zutphen (c. 1290–1331)	John I of Polanen (d. 1342) ⚭ Catherine of Brederode (1312/16–1372)	William VI of Horne (d. 1343) ⚭ 1315; Oda of Putten and Strijen (d. after 1327)	Simon I of Salm (d. 1346) ⚭ 1334; Mathilde of Saarbrücken (d. after 1354)	John of Valkenburg (d. 1356) ⚭ Mary of Herpen (d. after 1327)
Great-grandparents	Otto II of Nassau-Siegen (c. 1305–1350/51) ⚭ 1331; Adelaide of Vianden (d. 1376)		Adolf II of the Mark (d. 1347) ⚭ 1332; Margaret of Cleves (d. after 1348)		John II of Polanen (d. 1378) ⚭ 1348; Oda of Horne (d. before 1353)		John II of Salm (d. after 1400) ⚭ after 1355; Philippa of Valkenburg (?–?)	
Grandparents	John I of Nassau-Siegen (c. 1339–1416) ⚭ 1357; Margaret of the Mark (d. 1409)				John III of Polanen (d. 1394) ⚭ 1390; Odilia of Salm (d. 1428)			
Parents	Engelbert I of Nassau-Siegen (c. 1370–1442) ⚭ 1403; Joanne of Polanen (1392–1445)							

== Sources ==
- Van der Aa, A.J. (1860). "Jan IV, graaf van Nassau, Vianden, Dietz enz.". Biographisch Woordenboek der Nederlanden, bevattende levensbeschrijvingen van zoodanige personen, die zich op eenigerlei wijze in ons vaderland hebben vermaard gemaakt (in Dutch). Vol. Negende deel. Haarlem: J.J. van Brederode. pp. 87–88.
- Aßmann, Helmut & Menk, Friedhelm (1996). Auf den Spuren von Nassau und Oranien in Siegen (in German). Siegen: Gesellschaft für Stadtmarketing Siegen e.V.
- Becker, E. (1983) [1950]. Schloss und Stadt Dillenburg. Ein Gang durch ihre Geschichte in Mittelalter und Neuzeit. Zur Gedenkfeier aus Anlaß der Verleihung der Stadtrechte am 20. September 1344 herausgegeben (in German) (Neuauflage ed.). Dillenburg: Der Magistrat der Stadt Dillenburg.
- Blok, P.J. (1911). "Johan (Johann) IV, graaf van Nassau-Dillenburg". In Molhuysen, P.C. & Blok, P.J. (eds.). Nieuw Nederlandsch Biografisch Woordenboek (in Dutch). Vol. Eerste deel. Leiden: A.W. Sijthoff. pp. 1218–1219.
- Dek, A.W.E. (1970). Genealogie van het Vorstenhuis Nassau (in Dutch). Zaltbommel: Europese Bibliotheek.
- Van Ditzhuyzen, Reinildis (2004) [1992]. Oranje-Nassau. Een biografisch woordenboek (in Dutch) (3rd ed.). Haarlem: Becht. ISBN 90-230-1124-4.
- Feith, W.G. (1921). "De eerste Nassau's in Nederland". Maandblad van het genealogisch-heraldisch genootschap: "De Nederlandsche Leeuw" (in Dutch). 1921 (9): 222.
- Huberty, Michel; Giraud, Alain & Magdelaine, F. & B. (1981). l'Allemagne Dynastique (in French). Vol. Tome III: Brunswick-Nassau-Schwarzbourg. Le Perreux: Alain Giraud. ISBN 2-901138-03-9.
- Jansen, H.P.H. (1979). "De Bredase Nassaus". In Tamse, C.A. (ed.). Nassau en Oranje in de Nederlandse geschiedenis (in Dutch). Alphen aan den Rijn: A.W. Sijthoff. pp. 11–40. ISBN 90-218-2447-7.
- Lück, Alfred (1981) [1967]. Siegerland und Nederland (in German) (2nd ed.). Siegen: Siegerländer Heimatverein e.V.
- Pennings, J.C.M. & Schreuder, E.A.T.M. (1995). "Heer en meester van Ameland tot Zwaluwe. Het beheer en bestuur van de heerlijkheden van het Huis Oranje-Nassau door de Nassause Domeinraad (14de eeuw–1811)". In Van der Klooster, L.J.; Tiethoff-Spliethoff, M.E. & Tamse, C.A. (eds.). Jaarboek Oranje-Nassau Museum 1994 (in Dutch). Rotterdam: Barjesteh, Meeuwes & Co Historische Uitgeverij. pp. 45–75. ISBN 90-73714-18-4.
- Van Raak, Cees (1995). Heden vredig ontslapen. Funeraire geschiedenis van het huis Oranje-Nassau (in Dutch). Bussum: Uitgeverij Thoth. ISBN 90-6868-117-6.
- De Roo van Alderwerelt, J.K.H. (1960). "De graven van Vianden". De Nederlandsche Leeuw, Maandblad van het Koninklijk Nederlandsch Genootschap voor Geslacht- en Wapenkunde (in Dutch). 1960 (6): 196.
- Schutte, O. (1979). "Genealogische gegevens". In Tamse, C.A. (ed.). Nassau en Oranje in de Nederlandse geschiedenis (in Dutch). Alphen aan den Rijn: A.W. Sijthoff. pp. 40–44. ISBN 90-218-2447-7.
- Toebosch, Theo (1996). "Gebalsemde Oranjes". NRC Handelsblad (in Dutch).
- Van der Eycken, Michel (1980). "Diest en het Huis Oranje-Nassau". Diest en het Huis Oranje-Nassau. Diestsche Cronycke (in Dutch). Vol. 3. Diest: Stedelijk Museum. pp. 15–42.
- Vorsterman van Oyen, A.A. (1882). Het vorstenhuis Oranje-Nassau. Van de vroegste tijden tot heden (in Dutch). Leiden & Utrecht: A.W. Sijthoff & J.L. Beijers.
- De Vries Feyens, G.L. (1933). "De voorouders van den Prins van Oranje op Nederlandschen bodem". In De Savornin Lohman, Jhr. B.C.; De Vries Feyens, G.L.; Beelaerts van Blokland, Jhr. W.A.; Goosens, Th.J.A.J.; Van Schelven, A.A. & Theissen, J.S. (eds.). Prins Willem van Oranje 1533-1933 (in Dutch). Haarlem: H.D. Tjeenk Willink & Zoon N.V. pp. 11–24.
- Wenzelburger, Karl Theodor (1881). "Johann IV., Graf von Nassau-Dillenburg, Vianden, Diez etc.". Allgemeine Deutsche Biographie (in German). Vol. Band 14. Leipzig: Duncker & Humblot. pp. 251–252.

John IV of Nassau-Siegen House of Nassau-Siegen Born: 1 August 1410 Died: 3 February 1475
Regnal titles
Preceded by Engelbert I	Count of Nassau-Siegen; 3 May 1442 – 22 February 1447; 18 January 1451 – 3 February 1475	Succeeded by Henry II
Preceded by Henry II	Count of Nassau-Siegen; 3 May 1442 – 22 February 1447; 18 January 1451 – 3 February 1475	Succeeded by John V
Preceded by Engelbert I	Count of Vianden; 3 May 1442 – 22 February 1447; 18 January 1451 – 3 February 1475	Succeeded by Henry II
Preceded by Henry II	Count of Vianden; 3 May 1442 – 22 February 1447; 18 January 1451 – 3 February 1475	Succeeded by Engelbert II
Preceded by Engelbert I	Count of Diez; 3 May 1442 – 22 February 1447; 18 January 1451 – 3 February 1475	Succeeded by Henry II
Preceded by Henry II	Count of Diez; 3 May 1442 – 22 February 1447; 18 January 1451 – 3 February 1475	Succeeded by John V
Preceded by Engelbert I	Lord of Breda, etc. 3 May 1442 – 3 February 1475	Succeeded by Engelbert II
Political offices
Preceded by Henry of Moers	Marshal of Westphalia; 1450 – 1455	Succeeded by Konrad of Wrede
