= Adolph II =

Adolph II may refer to:

- Adolph II de la Marck (Bishop) (1288–1344), Price-Bishop of Liège
- Adolph II of the Marck (died 1347), Count of the Marck
- Adolph II, Count of Nassau-Wiesbaden-Idstein (1386–1426)
- Adolph II of Nassau (c. 1423–1475), Archbishop of Mainz
- Adolph II, Prince of Anhalt-Köthen (1458–1526)
- Adolphus Frederick II, Duke of Mecklenburg-Strelitz (1658–1708)
