= Van Polanen family =

Dutch noble family

Van Polanen
- Noble family
- Country: Netherlands
- Founded: 1295
- Founder: Philips van Duijvenvoorde / Jan van Polanen
- Dissolution: 1403 (marriage into House of Nassau)
- Titles inherited by the Monarch of the Netherlands

Van Polanen was a noble family that played an important role in the Netherlands during the Middle Ages. The impact of the family transcended its dissolution in the 15th century as the House of Nassau gained the vast properties of the House of Polanen in 1403 through marriage. The titles such as baron of Breda and lord of Polanen remain amongst the titles of the monarch of the Netherlands until today.

== History ==
The Van Polanen family was a side branch of the Van Wassenaer family which owned Duivenvoorde Castle since 1226. The branch took its name from Polanen Castle (Kasteel Polanen), a castle situated in Monster which was destroyed in 1351 and finally demolished in 1394.

Philips III van Duivenvoorde received the fief of Polanen in 1295. Willem van Duvenvoorde (1290–1353) purchased Oosterhout in 1324, together with vast properties around Breda and Bergen op Zoom, among them De Lek and Schoonenburg Castle (abandoned around 1450). The ruins of Strijen Castle, his possible residence, are still preserved in Oosterhout. Philips's son Jan I van Polanen, received the fief of Breda in 1339, together with his son John II who built a new castle there.

All of these properties were inherited by Johanna van Polanen who married Engelbert I of Nassau. Through this marriage the House of Nassau first gained territories in the Netherlands. Much later this fact, among others, led to the House of Orange-Nassau's rise to the ruling dynasty of the country.

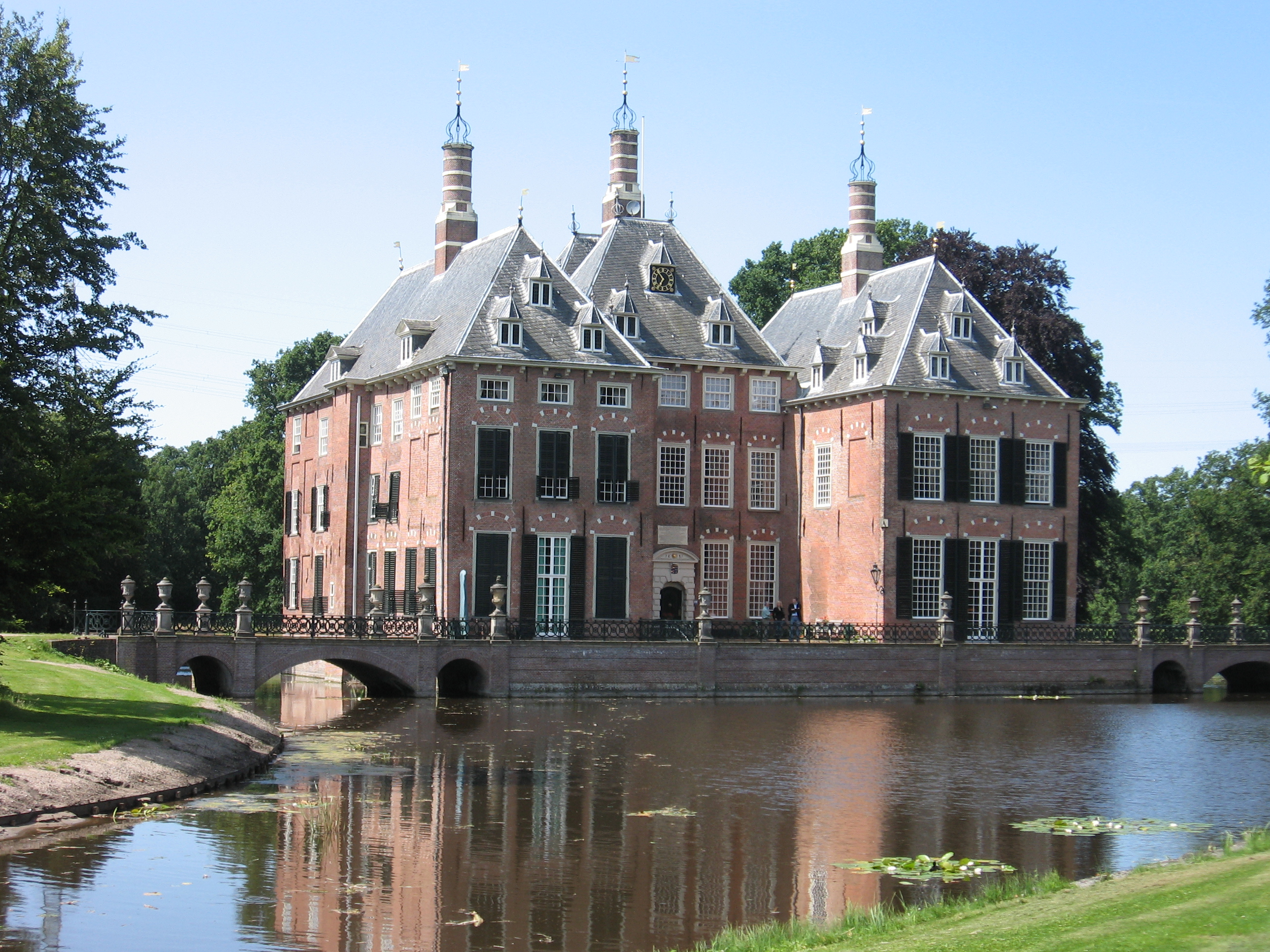
Duivenvoorde Castle

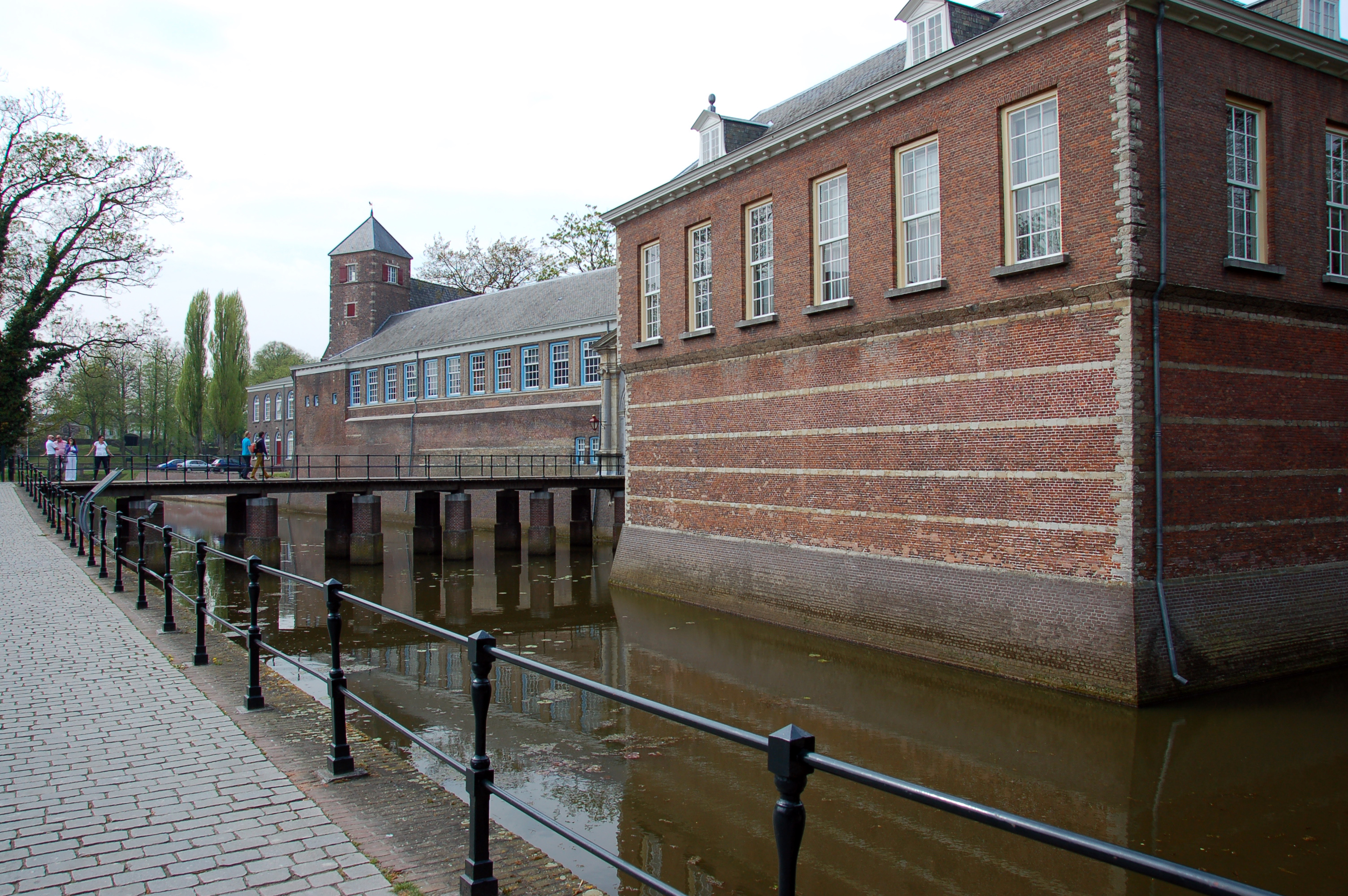
Breda Castle

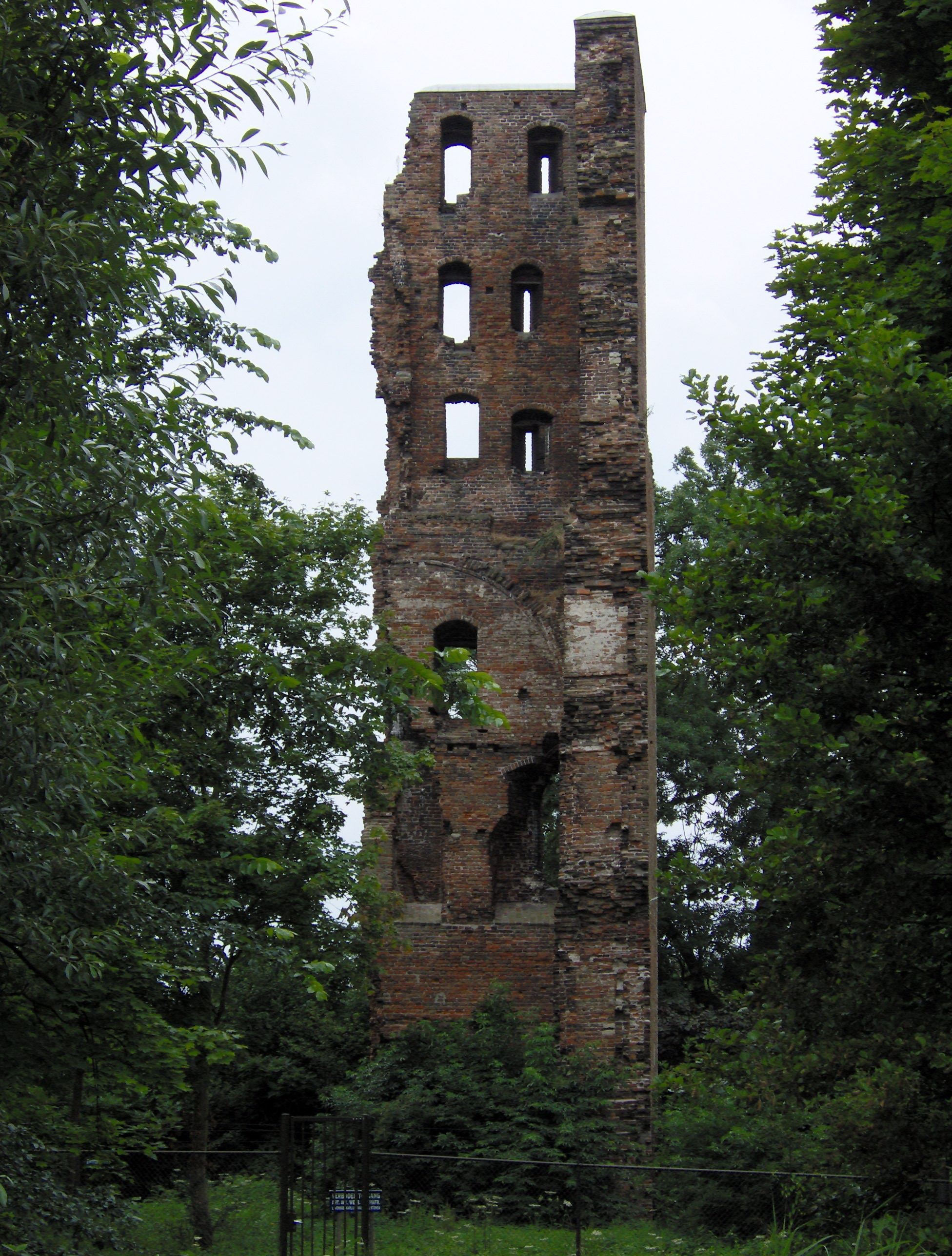
Strijen Castle, Oosterhout

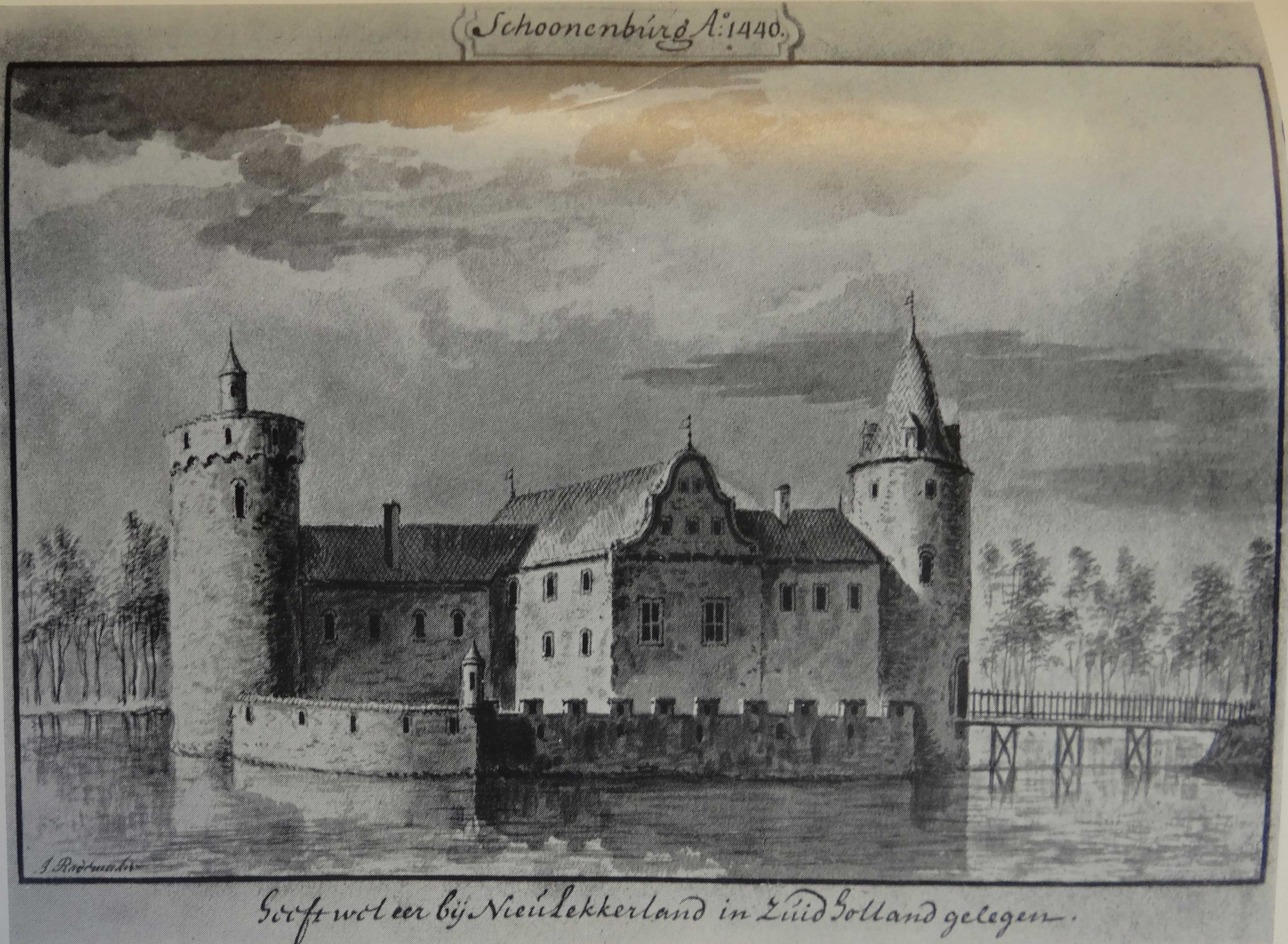
Schoonenburg near De Lek

== Family tree ==
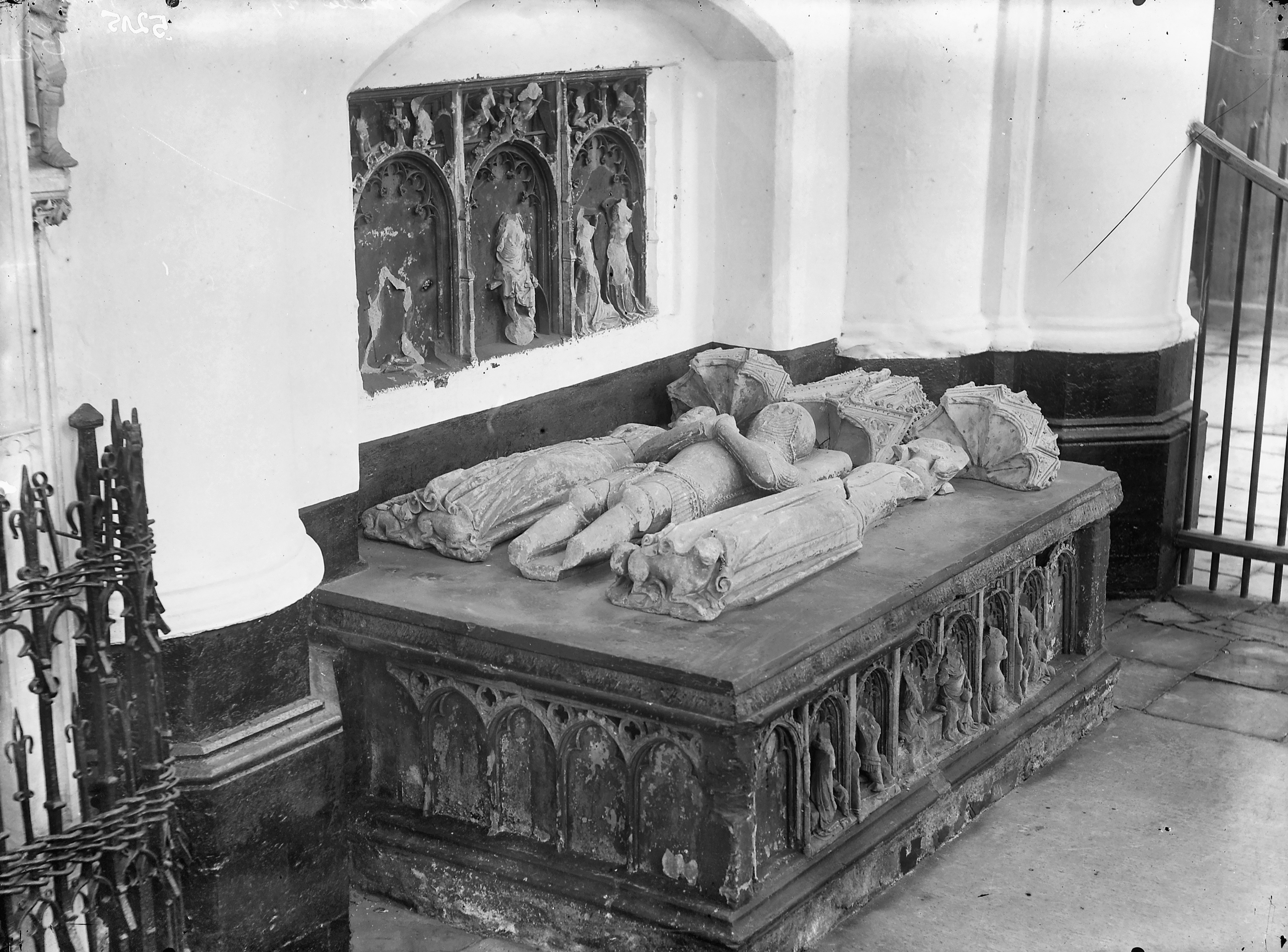
Grave of Johan II and his two wives in the Grote Kerk in Breda

- Philips III van Duivenvoorde (c. 1248 – after 1301) - 1st lord of Polanen (created 1295 - after 1301)
  - Jan I van Polanen (–1342)- 2nd lord (after 1301–1342) m. Katherina van Brederode (–1372)
    - Dirk van Polanen m. Elburg van Asperen
      - Otto van Polanen m. Johanna van Voorst
        - Elburg van Polanen m. Johan van Langerak
        - Cunegonda van Polanen m. Frederik van Hekeren genaamd van Rechteren
        - Jan van Polanen (1842- m.1 Elburg van Langerak m.2 Katharina von Gemen (–1493)
    - Philips van Polanen (–1375) 4th lord subfief for John II 1345-1378 m. Elisabeth van der Maele
      - Elisabeth van Polanen (–1404) m. Hugo van Heenvliet (–1409)
    - Johan II van Polanen (–1378) 3rd lord 1342-1345 m.1 Oda van Hoorne (–1353) m.2 Machteld bastard of Brabant (–1366) m.3 Margareta zur Lippe
      - Johan III van Polanen (–1394) 5th lord 1378-1394 m. Odilia von Salm (–1428)
        - Johanna van Polanen (1392–1445) Lady of Polanen 1394-1403 marriage to Engelbert I of Nassau (–1442). Through 'jure uxoris' the possessions and titles of the house Polanen were acquired by the House of Nassau
      - Oda van Polanen (–1417) m. Hendrik III van Montfoort (1402)
      - Hendrik van Polanen (–1427) m. 1 Johanna de Ghistelles m.2 Adelaide van Stalle
      - Dirk van Polanen m. Gillisje van Cralingen
      - Beatrix van Polanen m. Hendrik VIII van Boutershem
      - Maria van Polanen m. Willem van Cronenburch
      - Otto van der Leck (–1428) m. Sophia van den Bergh (–1412)
        - Willem II van Polanen (1404–1465) m. Lutgardis von Bentheim (–1445)

== Literature ==
- Detlev Schwennicke, Europäische Stammtafeln Band XXVIII (2012) Tafel 152.
