= John II of Nassau-Wiesbaden-Idstein =

John II, Count of Nassau-Wiesbaden-Idstein
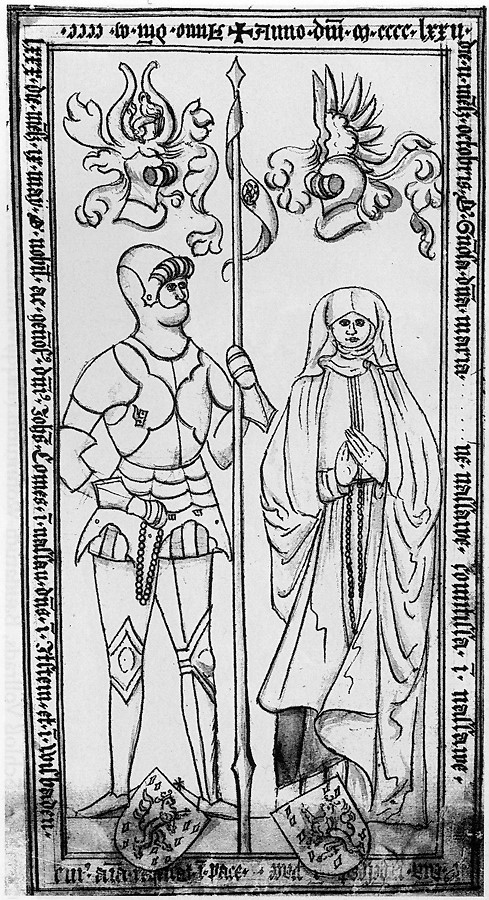
- Born: 1419
- Died: 9 May 1480
- Noble family: House of Nassau
- Spouse: Mary of Nassau-Siegen
- Father: Adolph II, Count of Nassau-Wiesbaden-Idstein
- Mother: Margaret of Baden

John II of Nassau-Wiesbaden-Idstein (born: 1419; died: 9 May 1480) was a son of Adolph II, Count of Nassau-Wiesbaden-Idstein and his wife Margarete of Baden, a daughter of Margrave Bernard I, Margrave of Baden-Baden en Anna of Oettingen. After his father's death in 1426, he ruled Nassau-Wiesbaden and Nassau-Idstein.

== Marriage and issue ==
In 1437, he married Mary (1418–1472), daughter of Engelbert I of Nassau. They had the following children:

- Maria (1438–1480), married in 1452 to Louis II of Isenburg
- John (1439–1480)
- Margarete (d. 1486)
- Anna (d. 1480), married in 1466 Otto II of Solms-Braunfels
- Adolf III (1443–1511), his successor in Nassau-Wiesbaden
- Bertha (b. 1446)
- Engelbert (1448–1508)
- Philip (1450–1509), his successor in Nassau-Idstein
- Anna

After his death, the inheritance was divided: Adolf III received Wiesbaden; Philip received Idstein. When Philip died childless in 1509, Idstein reverted to Adolf.

John II of Nassau-Wiesbaden-Idstein House of Nassau Born: 1419 Died: 9 May 1480
Preceded by Adolph II	Count of Nassau-Wiesbaden-Idstein; 1426–1480	Succeeded by Adolf III as Count of Nassau-Wiesbaden
Preceded by Adolph II	Count of Nassau-Wiesbaden-Idstein; 1426–1480	Succeeded by Philip as Count of Nassau-Idstein
