= Margarethe von Hanau-Lichtenberg =

German noblewoman

- Countess of Nassau-Wiesbaden-Idstein
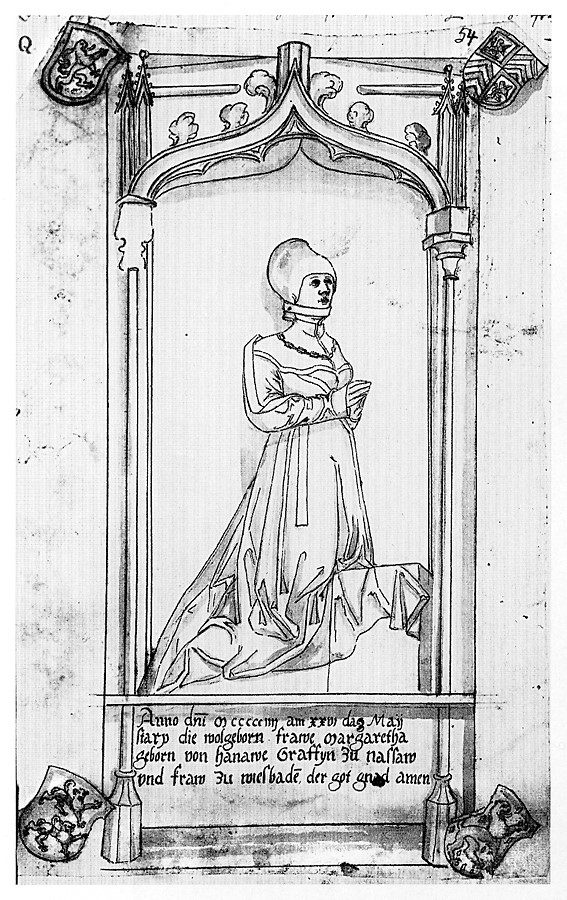
- 1632 drawing from her tomb.
- Born: 15 May 1463
- Died: 26 May 1504 (aged 41)
- Noble family: House of Hanau (by birth); House of Nassau (by marriage)
- Spouse: Adolf III of Nassau-Wiesbaden-Idstein
- Issue: Philip I, Count of Nassau-Wiesbaden-Idstein
- Father: Philipp I, Count of Hanau-Lichtenberg
- Mother: Anna von Lichtenberg

Countess Margarethe von Hanau-Lichtenberg, known upon her marriage as Margarethe, Countess of Nassau-Wiesbaden-Idstein (15 May 1463 – 26 May 1504) was a German noblewoman who, as the wife of Adolf III of Nassau-Wiesbaden-Idstein, was the Countess of Nassau-Wiesbaden and Nassau-Idstein.

== Biography ==
Margarethe was the daughter of Philipp I, Count of Hanau-Lichtenberg and Anna von Lichtenberg. Her father ruled over the county of Hanau-Lichtenberg and, after the death of her maternal grandfather, the Lordship of Lichtenberg. She was a younger sister of Philipp II, Count of Hanau-Lichtenberg.

On 20 June 1484 she married Adolf III, Count of Nassau-Wiesbaden. They had four children:

- Countess Maria Margaret (1487–1548), who married in 1502 to Louis I, Count of Nassau-Weilburg
- Countess Anna (1488–1550), married in 1506 to Henry XXXI of Schwarzburg-Sondershausen,
- Philip I, Count of Nassau-Wiesbaden-Idstein (1490–1558), who succeeded her husband as Count of Nassau-Wiesbaden-Idstein.

In 1509 her husband succeeded his childless brother, Philip, Count of Nassau-Idstein, as the Count of Nassau-Idenstein, therefore making Margarethe a countess of Idenstein.

She died on 26 May 1504.
