= Philip, Count of Nassau-Idstein =

Count of Nassau-Idstein

- Born: 1450
- Died: 16 June 1509
- Noble family: House of Nassau
- Spouse: Margaret of Zweibrücken-Veldenz
- Father: John II, Count of Nassau-Wiesbaden-Idstein
- Mother: Mary of Nassau-Siegen

Count Philip of Nassau-Idstein (1450 – 16 June 1509) was the youngest son of Count John II of Nassau-Wiesbaden-Idstein and his wife, Mary of Nassau-Siegen. In 1470, he married Margaret (1456–1527), the daughter of Count Palatine Louis I "the Black" of Zweibrücken-Veldenz.

After John II died in 1480, Philip ruled Nassau-Idstein, while his elder brother Adolf III ruled Nassau-Wiesbaden.

In 1509, Philip died childless. His brother Adolf III inherited Nassau-Idstein, thereby reuniting Nassau-Wiesbaden-Idstein.

Philip, Count of Nassau-Idstein House of Nassau Born: 1450 Died: 16 June 1509
Preceded by John II as Count of Nassau-Wiesbaden-Idstein	Count of Nassau-Idstein; 1480–1509	Succeeded by Adolf III as Count of Nassau-Wiesbaden-Idstein
