= Gageldonk =

Coordinates: 51°36′15″N 4°44′32″E

- Neighbourhood
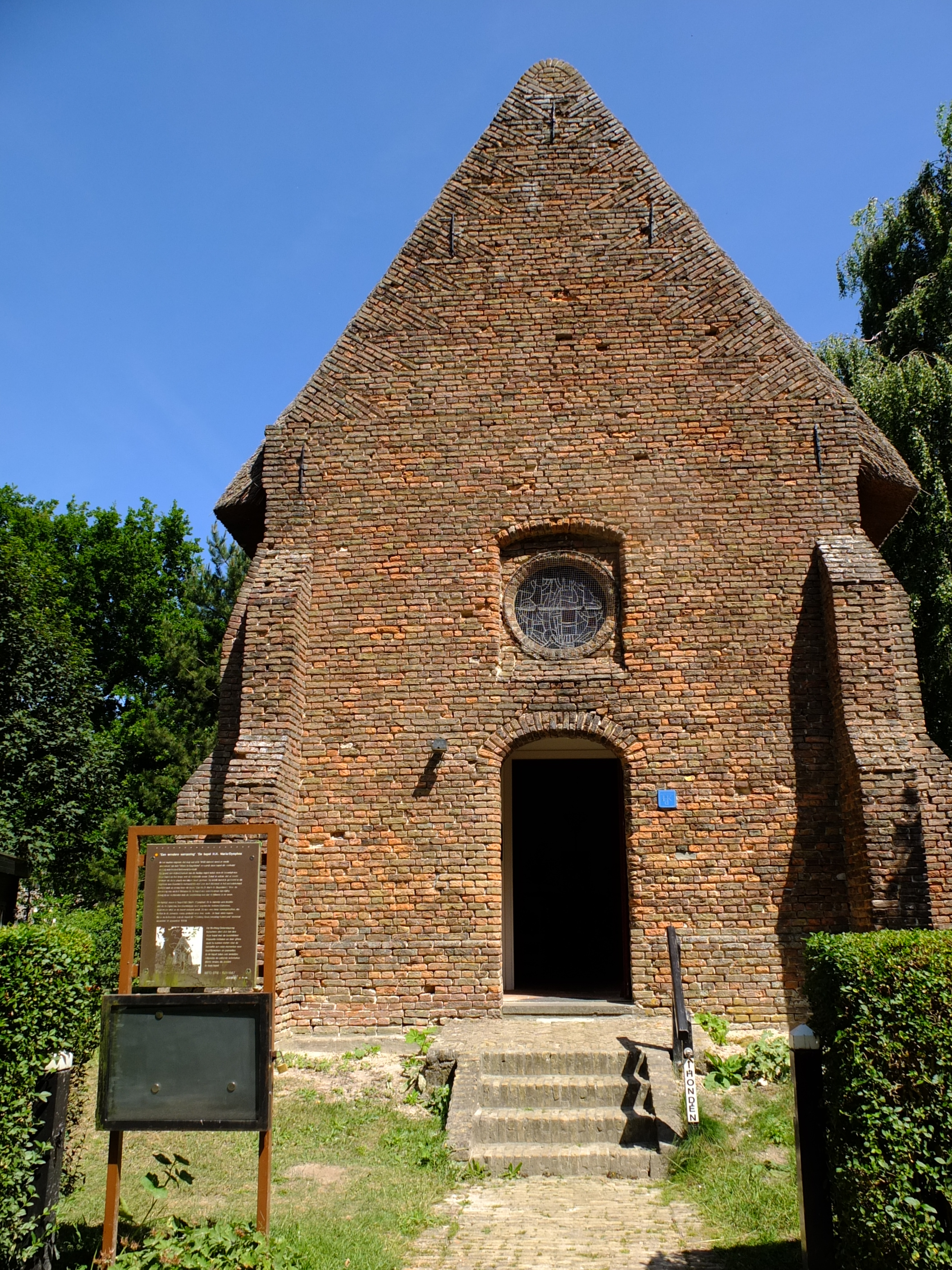
- The Kapel van Gageldonk at the Moerenpad
- Motto: Blaos Oew Eigen Wijs
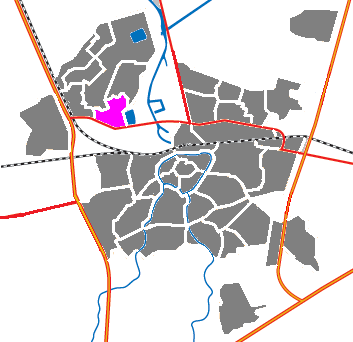
- Map of Breda with Gageldonk in pink
- Country: Netherlands
- Province: North Brabant
- Municipality: Breda
- City: Breda

Area
  - Total: 0.8 km^{2} (0.31 sq mi)
  - Land: 0.8 km^{2} (0.31 sq mi)
  - Water: 0 km^{2} (0 sq mi)

Population (2025)
  - Total: 4,610
  - Density: 5,800/km^{2} (15,000/sq mi)
- Time zone: UTC+1 (CET)
  - Summer (DST): UTC+2 (CEST)
- Postal code: 4824
- Area code: 076

Gageldonk is a neighbourhood in the city Breda. As of 2025, Gageldonk has 4610 residents.

== History ==
In the Middle Ages, Gageldonk was a castle with a chapel. Castle Gageldonk was first mentioned in 1312, when it was owned by Peter van Zevenbergen. In 1388, Willem van der Lek got the castle loaned. The most known owner is William the Silent, the leader of the Dutch during the Eighty Years' War. During the Eighty Years War, Castle Gageldonk got destroyed by the Geuzen in 1573. Only a chapel which was part of the castle is left over.

The neighbourhood Gageldonk is built in late 70s-80s with low-rise buildings and some apartments. In 1976, the area between the Mark and the A16 was ceded from Prinsenbeek (back then a separate municipality not part of Breda), to Breda.

== Demographics ==
Seeing in the table below, the greatest age group in Gageldonk are young adults (aged 25–45).

Age group	Amount in numbers	Percentage
0-15	790	17.1%
15-25	430	9.3%
25-45	1355	29.4%
45-65	1145	24.8%
65 or older	895	19.4%

87% of residents are born in the Netherlands, 13% of residents are born out of the Netherlands.

69,2% of foreign-born residents are born outside of Europe, 30,8% of foreign-born residents are born inside of Europe.

== Facilities ==
In Gageldonk, there is 1 elementary school called De Hoogakker.

At Donk, there is a shopping center named De Donken, built in 1979 .

== Transportation ==
Bus 2 stops 3 times in Gageldonk, going from Kievitsloop to the Hoge Vught.
