= Johanna van Polanen =

Dutch noblewoman

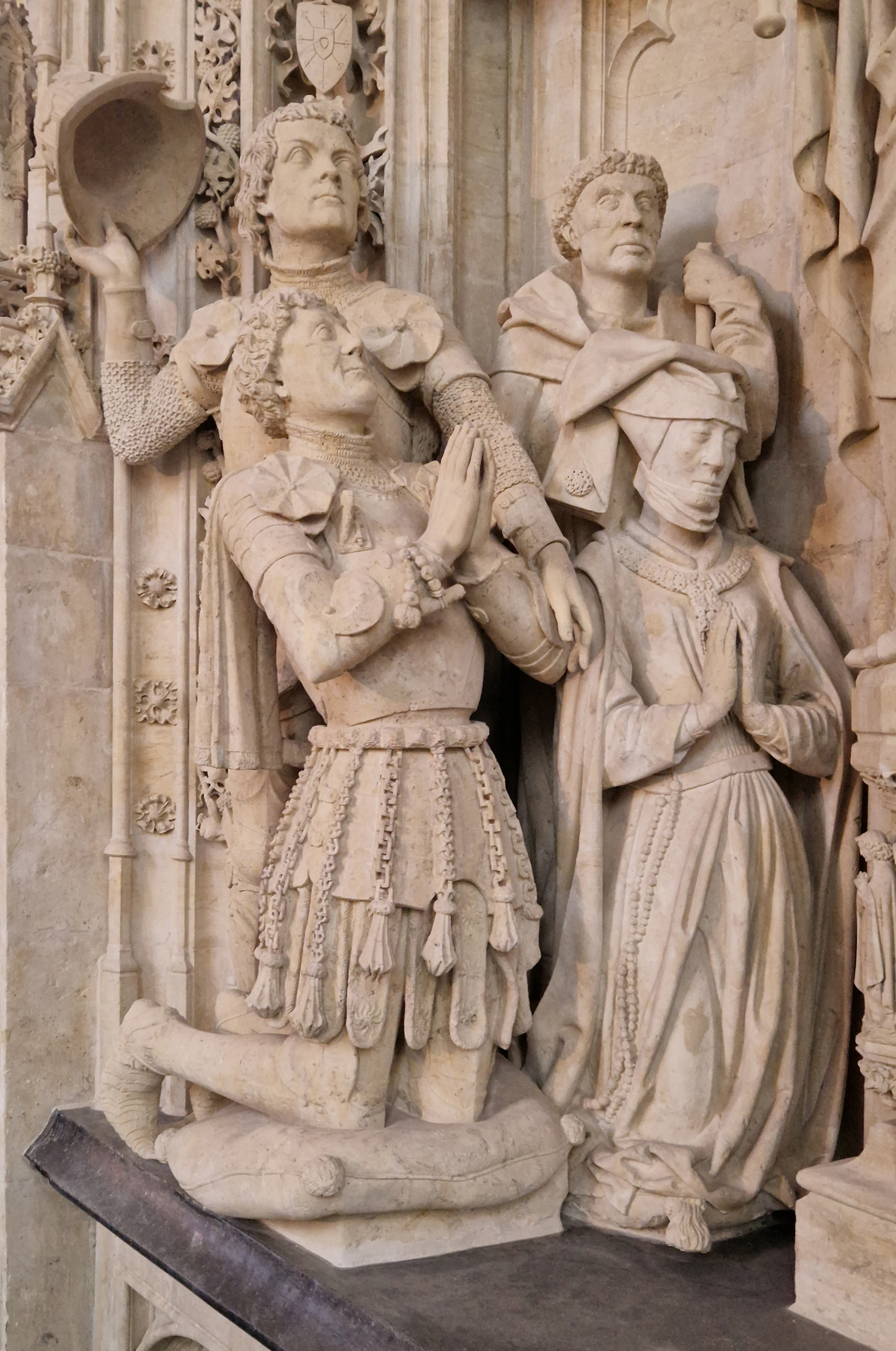
- Johanna van Polanen (right) kneeling in prayer next to Engelbrecht I of Nassau (Grote Kerk (Breda))
- Born: 10 January 1392
- Died: 15 May 1445 (aged 53); Breda
- Buried: Mausoleum of Engelbert I of Nassau in Breda
- Noble family: House of Polanen
- Spouse: Engelbert I of Nassau
- Father: John III, Lord of Polanen
- Mother: Odilia of Salm

Johanna van Polanen (also spelled as Jehenne; 10 January 1392 – 15 May 1445) was a Dutch noblewoman. She was the daughter of John III of Polanen, Lord of Breda, and his wife, Odilia of Salm. The House of Polanen was a side branch of the still existing House of Wassenaer.

Johanna married on 1 August 1403, at the age of 11, in Breda with Engelbert I of Nassau, who became Lord of Breda jure uxoris. Johanna and Engelbert resided in Breda; they also owned houses in Brussels and Mechelen. They had six children:

- John IV (b. 1410), Count of Nassau-Breda
- Henry II (b. 1414), Count of Nassau-Siegen
- Margaret (b. 1415)
- William (b. 1416)
- Mary (b. 1418)
- Philip (b. 1420)

Johanna inherited many Lordship, Heerlijkheden and manors in Holland, Brabant, Hainaut, Utrecht, Zeeland. She also inherited the western part of Krimpenerwaard, including the villages of Krimpen aan de Lek, Krimpen aan den IJssel, Lekkerkerk and Ouderkerk aan den IJssel. Most of these possessions had been acquired by William of Duivenvoorde. Through her inheritance, the House of Nassau became one of the wealthiest and most influential noble families in the Burgundian Netherlands.

Johanna died in 1445 in Breda, where she was buried in the mausoleum constructed for her husband in the Church of Our Lady (Grote Kerk) at the Market Square.
