= John III of Polanen =

John III, Lord of Polanen
- Polanen coat of arms
- Born: 1340
- Died: 10 August 1394
- Noble family: House of Polanen
- Spouse: Oda of Salm-Ravenstein
- Father: John II
- Mother: Oda of Horne

John III of Wassenaer, Lord of Polanen (1340 – 10 August 1394) was Lord of Polanen (a heerlijkheid south of Monster). The Lords of Polanen were a branch of the House of Wassenaer. He held extensive possessions besides the fief of Polanen.

He was the eldest son of John II (c. 1324 – 1378), from his first marriage to Oda of Horne (1318-1353). In 1353, his father inherited the extensive possessions of Willem van Duvenvoorde and in the same year, he purchased the Barony of Breda from the Duke of Brabant. When John II died in 1378, John III inherited most of these possessions.

John III was married to Countess Oda of Salm-Ravenstein (1370-1428). Their only child was their daughter Johanna van Polanen, who married Engelbert I of Nassau in 1404. Via this marriage, the House of Nassau inherited the Polanen possessions.

In his 1394 will, John III also mentioned three illegitimate children:

- a son
- Jan Grimhuysen, "Lord of the Leck". He married Adelaide of Egmont and had a daughter, Maria, who married William I of Bavaria-Schagen.
- Oda of the Leck
