= Engelbert I of Nassau =

German noble

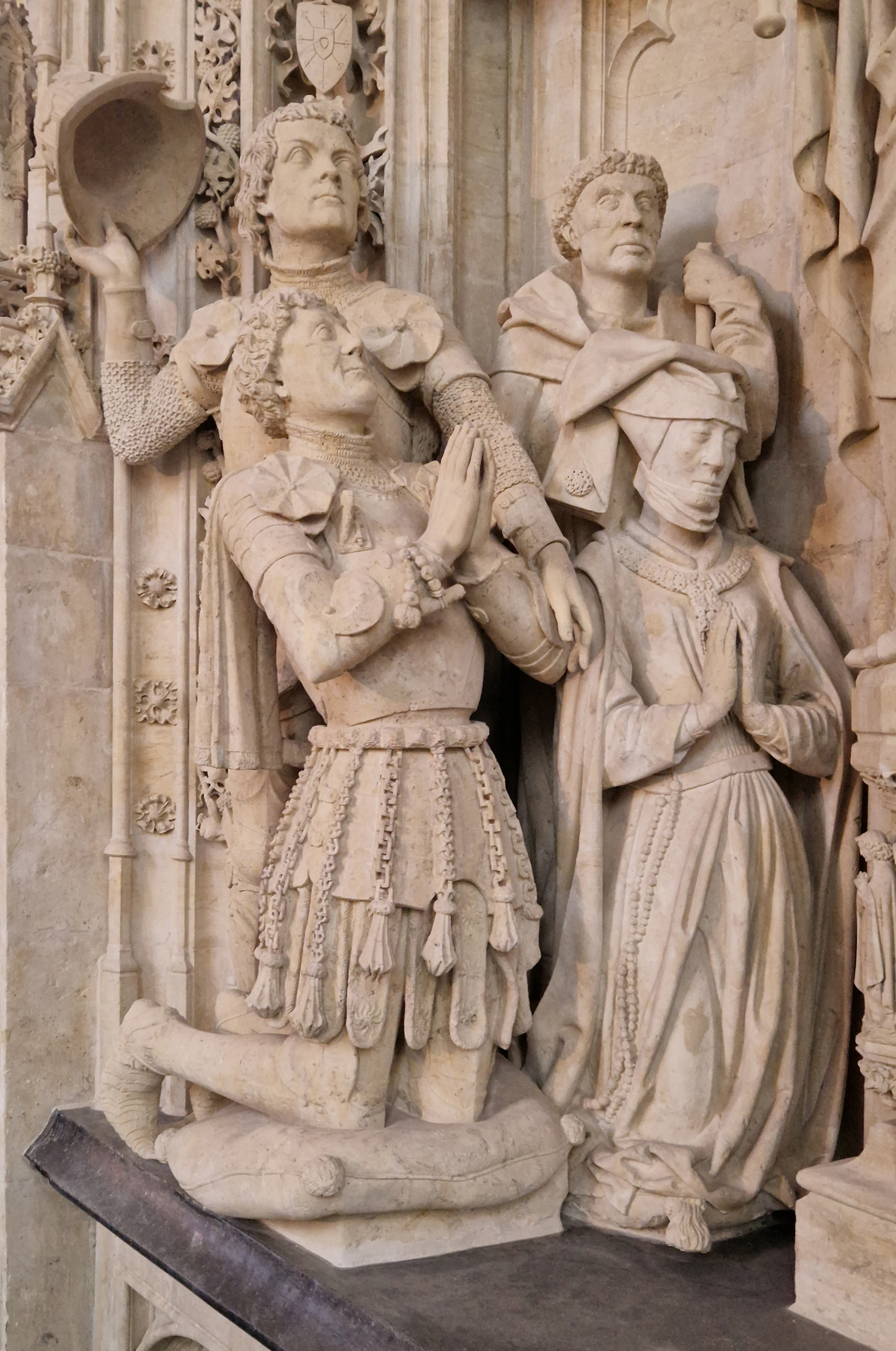
- Engelbert (in the front kneeling) depicted on his tomb in the Grote Kerk (Breda).
- Born: c. 1370; Dillenburg
- Died: 3 May 1442 (aged 71–72); Breda
- Buried: Church of Our Lady in Breda
- Noble family: House of Nassau
- Spouse: Johanna van Polanen
- Issue: John IV, Count of Nassau-Siegen; Henry II, Count of Nassau-Siegen; Margaretha; Willem; Mary; Philip; Margaretha of Nassau (ill.)
- Father: John I of Nassau-Siegen
- Mother: Margaret of the Mark

Engelbert I of Nassau (c. 1370, in Dillenburg – 3 May 1442, in Breda) was a son of Count John I of Nassau-Siegen and Countess Margaret of the Mark, daughter of Count Adolph II of the Marck.

== Early years ==
Engelbert of Nassau was a student in Cologne, Germany in 1389 and a dean in Münster from 1399 to 1404. He became counselor to the Duke of Brabant, first to Anton of Burgundy, and later for his son Jan IV of Brabant. He would later serve Philip the Good.

== Marriage and issue ==
Engelbert's brothers were childless and he left the deanery so he could marry Johanna van Polanen in 1403. They had six children:

- John IV, Count of Nassau-Siegen (born 1 August 1410) married Mary of Looz-Heinsberg
- Henry II, Count of Nassau-Siegen (born 7 January 1414) married 1) Genoveva of Virneburg 2) Irmgard of Schleiden-Junkerath
- Margaretha (born 1415), married Diederik, Count of Sayn
- Willem (born December 1416)
- Mary (born 2 February 1418 - died 2 October 1472), married Count John II of Nassau-Wiesbaden-Idstein
- Philip (born 13 October 1420 – died 1429)

Engelbert had an illegitimate daughter with an unknown mistress:

- Margaretha of Nassau. She married Hugo Wijnrix.

He died May 3, 1442, in Breda. A mausoleum was built for Engelbert in the Church-of-Our-Lady (the Great Church) in Breda. The construction took thirty years, from 1460 to 1490.
