= Adolph II of Nassau-Wiesbaden-Idstein =

Adolph II, Count of Nassau-Wiesbaden-Idstein
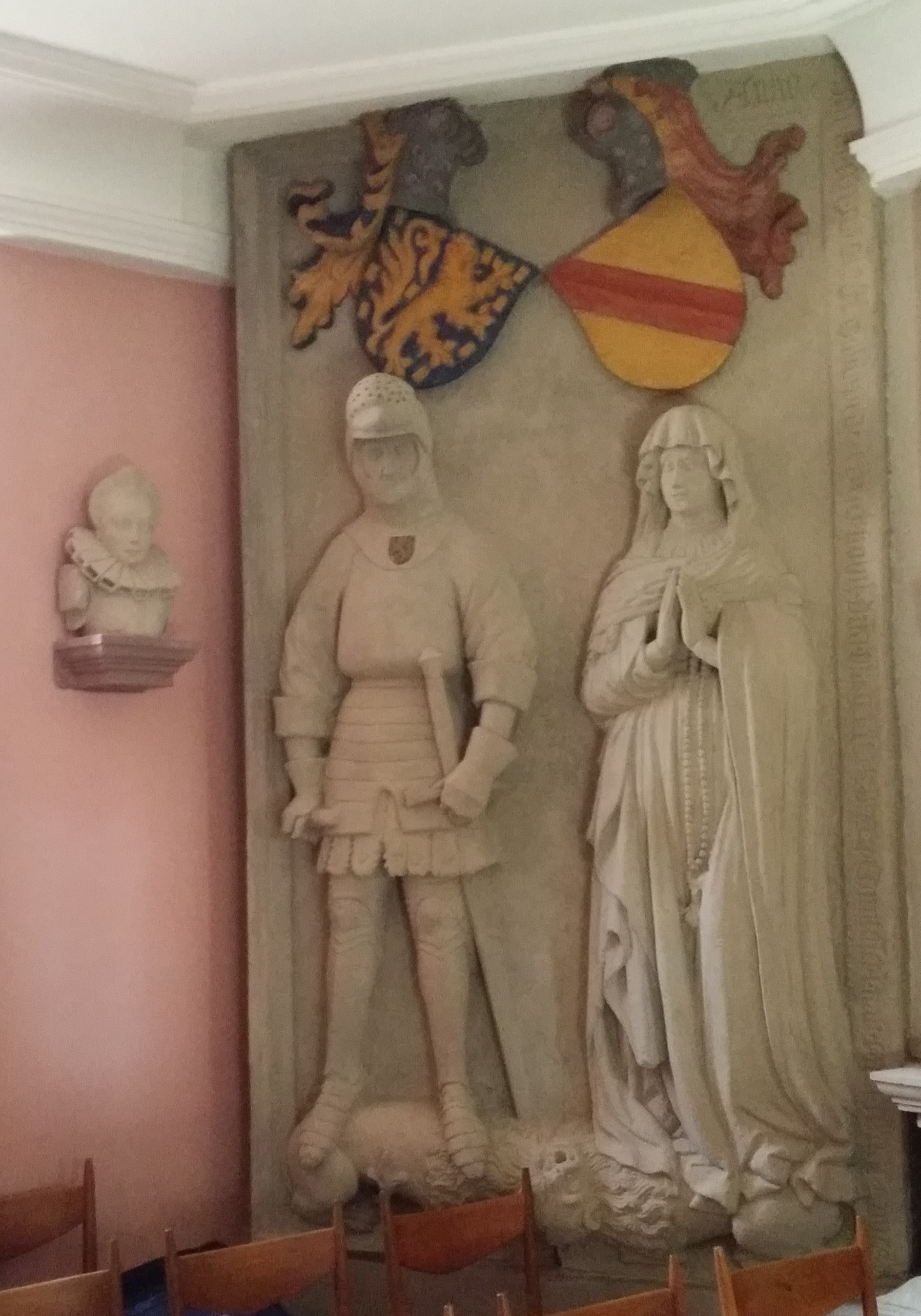
- Born: 1386
- Died: 16 July 1426
- Noble family: House of Nassau
- Spouse: Margaret of Baden-Baden
- Father: Walram IV, Count of Nassau-Idstein
- Mother: Bertha of Westerburg

Adolph II, Count of Nassau-Wiesbaden-Idstein (1386 – 16 July 1426) was a son of Walram IV, Count of Nassau-Idstein his wife, Bertha of Westerburg. He married in 1418 with Margaret (1404–1442), a daughter of Bernard I, Margrave of Baden-Baden. After his father's death in 1393, he ruled Nassau-Wiesbaden and Nassau-Idstein.

His children were:

- John II (1419–1480), who succeeded him
- Anna, married in 1438 with Everard III of Eppstein-Königstein
- Adolph (1422–1475) archbishop of Mainz.
- Walram
- Agnes (d. 1485), married in 1464 with Conrad IX of Bickenbach
