= County of Nassau =

State of the Holy Roman Empire (1125–1806)

County of Nassau Princely County/Principality of Nassau Counties/(later) Principalities of Nassau (Gefürsteter) Grafschaft Nassau (German) Fürstentümer Nassau (German)
- 1125/1159–1806
- Coat of arms

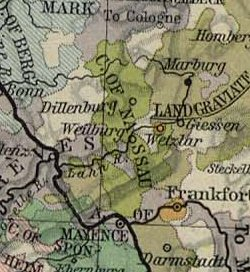
- County of Nassau in 1547
- Status: County
- Capital: Nassau
- Common languages: German (Rhine Franconian dialects, Moselle Franconian dialects)
- Religion: Roman Catholic
- Historical era: Middle Ages
  - Foundation of the city which is the namesake: 915
  - Countly title declared and non-recognized: 1125/1159
  - Recognition of the title: 1159
  - Splitings inside it because of succession: 1255–1806
  - Declaration of the duchy: 1806
Preceded by	Succeeded by
Bishopric of Worms	Duchy of Nassau
- Today part of: Germany

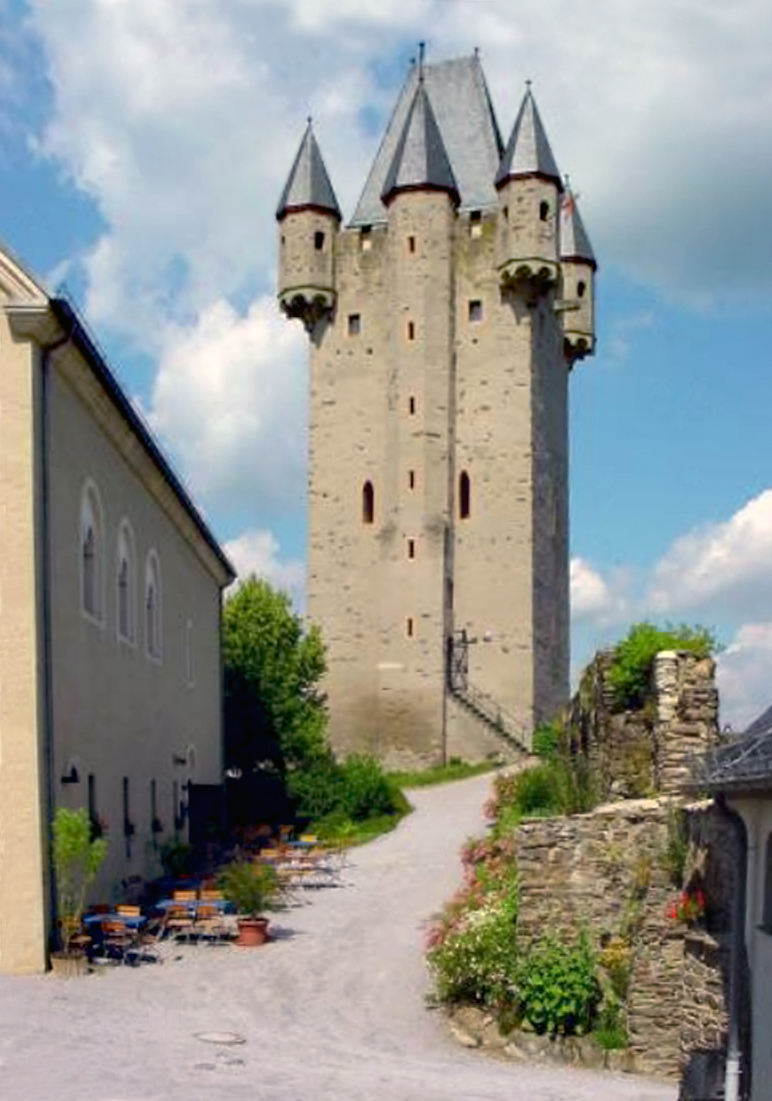
Nassau Castle

The County of Nassau was a German state within the Holy Roman Empire from the period of the formal recognition of the countly title in 1159 (though "de facto" sovereignty began in 1125) until the declaration of the Duchy of Nassau in 1806 with the creation of the Confederation of the Rhine. Through succession, it had many counts ruling parts of it, mostly or completely independent of one another. After many of these counts were promoted to princely status, the County was promoted and thus was known as a Princely County or as the Principality of Nassau.

== Origins ==
Nassau, originally a county, developed on the lower Lahn river in what is known today as Rhineland-Palatinate. The town of Nassau was founded in 915. Dudo of Laurenburg held Nassau as a fiefdom as granted by the Bishopric of Worms. His son, Rupert, built the Nassau Castle there around 1125, declaring himself "Count of Nassau". This title was not officially acknowledged by the Bishop of Worms until 1159 under the rule of Rupert's son, Walram. By 1159, the County of Nassau effectively claimed rights of taxation, toll collection, and justice, at which point it can be considered to become a state.

The Nassauers held the territory between the Taunus and the Westerwald at the lower and middle Lahn. By 1128, they acquired the bailiwick of the Bishopric of Worms, which had numerous rights in the area, and thus created a link between their heritage at the lower Lahn and their possessions near Siegen. In the middle of the 12th century, this relationship was strengthened by the acquisition of parts of the Hesse-Thüringen feudal kingdom, namely the Herborner Mark, the Kalenberger Zent and the Court of Heimau (Löhnberg). Closely linked to this was the "Lordship of Westerwald", also in Nassau's possession at the time. At the end of the 12th century, the House acquired the Reichshof Wiesbaden, an important base in the southwest.

In 1255, after the Counts of Nassau acquired the estates of Weilburg, the sons of Count Henry II divided Nassau for the first time. Walram II received the county of Nassau-Weilburg. From 1328 on, his younger brother, Otto I, held the estates north of the Lahn river, namely the County of Nassau-Siegen and Nassau-Dillenburg. The boundary line was essentially the Lahn, with Otto receiving the northern part of the county with the cities of Siegen, Dillenburg, Herborn and Haiger and Walram retaining the section south of the river, including the cities of Weilburg and Idstein.

=== County of Nassau-Weilburg ===
Walram's son Adolf became King of Germany in 1292. His son Count Gerlach abdicated in 1344 and the county was divided under his sons in 1355

- County of Nassau-Weilburg, again divided from 1442 to 1574
  - County of Nassau-Saarbrücken (Elder)
  - County of Nassau-Weilburg
- County of Nassau-Wiesbaden, again divided from 1480 to 1509
  - County of Nassau-Idstein
  - County of Nassau-Wiesbaden

fell back to Nassau-Weilburg in 1605

- County of Nassau-Sonnenberg, partitioned among Nassau-Wiesbaden and Nassau-Weilburg in 1405

In 1605, all parts of Nassau-Weilburg were again unified under Count Louis II; however, after his death in 1627, his sons divided the county again

- County of Nassau-Idstein, fell to Nassau-Ottweiler in 1721
- County of Nassau-Saarbrücken (Younger), divided again in 1640
  - County of Nassau-Saarbrücken, fell to Nassau-Ottweiler in 1723
  - County of Nassau-Ottweiler, fell to Nassau-Usingen in 1728
  - County of Nassau-Usingen, Principality in 1688
- County of Nassau-Weilburg (Younger)

After Nassau-Usingen had inherited Nassau-Ottweiler with former Nassau-Idstein and Nassau-Saarbrücken, it was reunified with Nassau-Weilburg and raised to the Duchy of Nassau in 1806.

=== County of Nassau-Dillenburg ===
After the death of Count Otto I, his county was divided between his sons in 1303:

- County of Nassau-Dillenburg, fell to Nassau-Siegen in 1328
- County of Nassau-Hadamar (Elder), fell to Nassau-Dillenburg in 1394
- County of Nassau-Siegen, called Nassau-Dillenburg from 1328 on, again got divided from 1341 to 1561:
  - County of Nassau-Beilstein (Elder)
  - County of Nassau-Dillenburg (Elder)–1606)

In 1504, Henry III of Nassau-Dillenburg inherited the county's estates at Breda in the Duchy of Brabant, while his younger brother William became Count of Nassau-Dillenburg in 1516. After the son of Henry III, René of Châlon died in 1544, Count William's eldest son William the Silent became Prince of Orange and Lord of Breda, Stadtholder in the Low Countries from 1559 on, leader in the Dutch Revolt for independence from the Spanish Empire and Pater Patriae of the Netherlands. His younger brother, John VI, again reunited all Nassau-Dillenburg possessions in 1561, though the county was again divided after his death in 1606.

- County of Nassau-Hadamar (Younger), Principality in 1650, fell to Nassau-Diez in 1743
- County of Nassau-Siegen, (1607–23), again got divided from 1623 to 1734:
  - County of Nassau-Siegen (Protestant), Principality in 1664, became extinct in 1734
  - County of Nassau-Siegen (Catholic), Principality, fell to Nassau-Diez in 1743
- County of Nassau-Dillenburg, fell to Nassau-Beilstein in 1620
- County of Nassau-Beilstein (Younger), called Nassau-Dillenburg (Younger) from 1620 on, Principality in 1652, fell to Nassau-Dietz in 1739
- County of Nassau-Dietz, fell to Joachim Murat's Grand Duchy of Berg after the dissolution of the Holy Roman Empire in 1806

The Counts of Nassau-Dietz, descendants of William Frederick were stadtholders of Friesland, Groningen and Drenthe and Princes of Orange from 1702 on. When they lost their Dutch possessions during the Napoleonic Wars, they were compensated with the Principality of Nassau-Orange-Fulda. Though they lost their German possessions in 1806, the House of Orange-Nassau, through female succession, was the reigning house of the Grand Duchy of Luxembourg until 1890 and is still the royal house of the Netherlands.

== Rulers ==
=== House of Nassau ===
Partitions of Nassau under Nassau rule

County of Laurenburg/ Nassau (1093-1255)
County of Northern Nassau (Ottonian Line) (1255-1303)	County of Southern Nassau (Walramian Line) (1255-1355)
County of Dillenburg (1st creation) (1303-1328)	County of Hadamar (1st creation) (1303-1394)
County of Beilstein (1343-1561)
County of Sonnenberg (1355-1404)
County of Weilburg (1355-1806)
County of Siegen (1303-1652/64)	Barony of Breda (1403-1544); Renamed as: Principality of Orange-Nassau (1st creation, Siegen-Breda line) (1544-1702)	County of Wiesbaden-Idstein (1st creation) (1355-1605) (divided 1370-86; 1480-1509; 1554-56; 1564-66)
County of Saarbrücken (1st creation) (1429-1574)
County of Hadamar (2nd creation) (1620-1650); Raised to: Principality of Hadamar (1650-1711)	(In 1623 divided in Catholic and Protestant ruling lines) Both lines raised to: Catholic Principality of Siegen (1652-1743) and Protestant Principality of Siegen (1664-1734)
County of Idstein (2nd creation) (1627-1688) Raised to: Principality of Idstein (1688-1721)
County of Ottweiler (1659-1721)
County of Dillenburg (2nd creation) (1606-1654) Raised to: Principality of Dillenburg (1654-1739)
County of Dietz (1606-1654); Raised to: Principality of Dietz (1654-1702)	County of Saarbrücken (2nd creation) (1627-1728)
Renamed as: Principality of Orange-Nassau (2nd creation, Dietz line) (1702-1806)	County of Usingen (1659-1688); Raised to: Principality of Usingen (1688-1806)
Principality of Saarbrücken (1741-1797)
Annexed by France
Principality of Orange-Nassau (2nd creation, Dietz line) (1813-1815)	Duchy of Nassau (1806-1866)
Annexed by Prussia

Table of rulers

Ruler	Born	Reign	Ruling part	Consort	Death	Notes
Dudo	?	1093 – 1117	County of Laurenburg/ Nassau	Irmgard/Demudis of Arnstein three children	c.1117	Founder of the family and the county.
Rupert I	c.1090 First son of Dudo and Irmgard/Demudis of Arnstein	1117 – 1154	County of Laurenburg/ Nassau	Beatrix of Limburg before 1135 four children	c.1154 aged c.63/64	Sons of Dudo, ruled jointly. Arnold abdicated from the co-regency.
Arnold I	c.1090 Second son of Dudo and Irmgard/Demudis of Arnstein	1117 – 1148/50	County of Laurenburg/ Nassau	Unmarried	c.1148/50 aged c.58-60	Sons of Dudo, ruled jointly. Arnold abdicated from the co-regency.
Rupert II	c.1120 First son of Rupert I and Beatrix of Limburg	1154 – 1159	County of Laurenburg/ Nassau	Beatrix at least two children	c.1159 aged c.38-39	Sons of Rupert I, ruled jointly.
Arnold II	c.1137 Second son of Rupert I and Beatrix of Limburg	1154 – 1159	County of Laurenburg/ Nassau	Unknown at least one child	c.1159 aged c.21-22	Sons of Rupert I, ruled jointly.
Regency of Beatrix of Limburg (1159-1160)						Cousins, ruled together. Rupert III, Arnold II's son, co- ruled with Henry I, Rupert II's son. In 1167, Henry I died in Rome during the August 1167 epidemic (after the Battle of Monte Porzio). His death made his brother Waleran replace him in the co-regency. In 1191, Rupert III's death made his son Herman the new co-regent, but he abdicated the next year. In 1193, Waleran I (then already sole ruler) would become the first legalized Count of Nassau.
Rupert III the Bellicose	c.1130/40? Son of Arnold II	1159 – 23/28 December 1191	County of Laurenburg/ Nassau	Elysa of Leiningen; 1169 two children	23/28 December 1191 aged c.51-61	Cousins, ruled together. Rupert III, Arnold II's son, co- ruled with Henry I, Rupert II's son. In 1167, Henry I died in Rome during the August 1167 epidemic (after the Battle of Monte Porzio). His death made his brother Waleran replace him in the co-regency. In 1191, Rupert III's death made his son Herman the new co-regent, but he abdicated the next year. In 1193, Waleran I (then already sole ruler) would become the first legalized Count of Nassau.
Henry I	c.1140 First son of Rupert II and Beatrix	1159 – August 1167	County of Laurenburg/ Nassau	Unmarried	August 1167; Rome aged c.26/27	Cousins, ruled together. Rupert III, Arnold II's son, co- ruled with Henry I, Rupert II's son. In 1167, Henry I died in Rome during the August 1167 epidemic (after the Battle of Monte Porzio). His death made his brother Waleran replace him in the co-regency. In 1191, Rupert III's death made his son Herman the new co-regent, but he abdicated the next year. In 1193, Waleran I (then already sole ruler) would become the first legalized Count of Nassau.
Waleran I	1146; Second son of Rupert II and Beatrix	August 1167 – 1 February 1198	County of Laurenburg/ Nassau	Kunigunde of Ziegenhain before 1135 four children	1 February 1198 aged 51/52	Cousins, ruled together. Rupert III, Arnold II's son, co- ruled with Henry I, Rupert II's son. In 1167, Henry I died in Rome during the August 1167 epidemic (after the Battle of Monte Porzio). His death made his brother Waleran replace him in the co-regency. In 1191, Rupert III's death made his son Herman the new co-regent, but he abdicated the next year. In 1193, Waleran I (then already sole ruler) would become the first legalized Count of Nassau.
Herman	c.1170 Son of Rupert III and Elysa of Leiningen	23/28 December 1191 – 1192	County of Laurenburg/ Nassau	Unmarried	c.1210? aged c.39/40?	Cousins, ruled together. Rupert III, Arnold II's son, co- ruled with Henry I, Rupert II's son. In 1167, Henry I died in Rome during the August 1167 epidemic (after the Battle of Monte Porzio). His death made his brother Waleran replace him in the co-regency. In 1191, Rupert III's death made his son Herman the new co-regent, but he abdicated the next year. In 1193, Waleran I (then already sole ruler) would become the first legalized Count of Nassau.
Henry II the Rich	c.1180 First son of Waleran I and Kunigunde of Ziegenhain	1 February 1198 – 26 April 1250	County of Nassau	Matilda of Guelders before 1221 eleven children	26 April 1250 aged c.69/70	Sons of Waleran I, ruled together. From 1230 to 1240, Rupert was a Knight of the Teutonic Order.
Rupert IV	c.1180 Second son of Waleran I and Kunigunde of Ziegenhain	1 February 1198 – 1230	County of Nassau	Gertrude of Isenburg-Cleeberg c. 11 December 1215 no children	c.1239 aged c.58/59	Sons of Waleran I, ruled together. From 1230 to 1240, Rupert was a Knight of the Teutonic Order.
Henry II's sons, Waleran II and Otto I, who were ruling together, split the Nassau possessions on 17 December 1255, by a treaty called Prima divisio, which determined the Lahn river as border of the two halves: to the south, called Southern Nassau, was ruled by Waleran and his descendants, who became known as the Walramian Line, which became important in the County of Nassau and Luxembourg; to the north, called Northern Nassau the county was ruled by Otto and his descendants, who became known as the Ottonian Line, which would inherit parts of Nassau, France and the Netherlands.
Waleran II	c.1220 First son of Henry II and Matilda of Guelders	26 April 1250 – 16 December 1255	County of Nassau	Adelaide of Katzenelnbogen before 1250 seven children	24 January 1276 aged c.55/56	Children of Henry II, ruled jointly until 1255, when they issued the Prima divisio, regulating their division of lands: Waleran received the land to the south of Lahn river: He was count of Nassau in Wiesbaden, Idstein, and Weilburg; Otto received the land to the north of Lahn river: He was count of Nassau in Dillenburg, Hadamar, Siegen, Herborn and Beilstein.
Waleran II	c.1220 First son of Henry II and Matilda of Guelders	16 December 1255 – 24 January 1276	Southern Nassau	Adelaide of Katzenelnbogen before 1250 seven children	24 January 1276 aged c.55/56	Children of Henry II, ruled jointly until 1255, when they issued the Prima divisio, regulating their division of lands: Waleran received the land to the south of Lahn river: He was count of Nassau in Wiesbaden, Idstein, and Weilburg; Otto received the land to the north of Lahn river: He was count of Nassau in Dillenburg, Hadamar, Siegen, Herborn and Beilstein.
Otto I	1224; Second son of Henry II and Matilda of Guelders	26 April 1250 – 16 December 1255	County of Nassau	Agnes of Leiningen before 1270 five children	between 3 May 1289 and 19 March 1290 aged c.64-66	Children of Henry II, ruled jointly until 1255, when they issued the Prima divisio, regulating their division of lands: Waleran received the land to the south of Lahn river: He was count of Nassau in Wiesbaden, Idstein, and Weilburg; Otto received the land to the north of Lahn river: He was count of Nassau in Dillenburg, Hadamar, Siegen, Herborn and Beilstein.
Otto I	1224; Second son of Henry II and Matilda of Guelders	16 December 1255 – 1289/90	Northern Nassau	Agnes of Leiningen before 1270 five children	between 3 May 1289 and 19 March 1290 aged c.64-66	Children of Henry II, ruled jointly until 1255, when they issued the Prima divisio, regulating their division of lands: Waleran received the land to the south of Lahn river: He was count of Nassau in Wiesbaden, Idstein, and Weilburg; Otto received the land to the north of Lahn river: He was count of Nassau in Dillenburg, Hadamar, Siegen, Herborn and Beilstein.
Adolf I	1255; Second son of Waleran II and Adelaide of Katzenelnbogen	24 January 1276 – 2 July 1298	County of Southern Nassau	Imagina of Isenburg-Limburg; 1270 eight children	2 July 1298; Göllheim aged 42/43	In 1292 was crowned King of Germany.
Henry I	c.1270 First son of Otto I, Count of Nassau and Agnes of Leiningen	1289/90 – 1303	County of Northern Nassau	Adelaide of Sponheim-Heinsberg; 1302 five children	July/August 1343 aged 72/73	Sons of Otto I, ruled together until 1303, when they divided the land: Henry received Nassau-Siegen (Siegen, Ginsberg, Haiger, and the Westerwald), Emicho received Nassau-Hadamar and John received Nassau-Dillenburg. However, after the childless death of John, Nassau-Dillenburg (and the towns of Dillenburg, Herborn, and Beilstein) fell to Nassau-Siegen, which adopted the name Nassau-Dillenburg. Siegen and Dillenburg were united until 1606.
Henry I	c.1270 First son of Otto I, Count of Nassau and Agnes of Leiningen	1303 – July/August 1343	County of Siegen	Adelaide of Sponheim-Heinsberg; 1302 five children	July/August 1343 aged 72/73	Sons of Otto I, ruled together until 1303, when they divided the land: Henry received Nassau-Siegen (Siegen, Ginsberg, Haiger, and the Westerwald), Emicho received Nassau-Hadamar and John received Nassau-Dillenburg. However, after the childless death of John, Nassau-Dillenburg (and the towns of Dillenburg, Herborn, and Beilstein) fell to Nassau-Siegen, which adopted the name Nassau-Dillenburg. Siegen and Dillenburg were united until 1606.
Emicho I	c.1285 Second son of Otto I, Count of Nassau and Agnes of Leiningen	1289/90 – 1303	County of Northern Nassau	Anna of Nuremberg before 1297 eight children	7 June 1334 aged 48–49	Sons of Otto I, ruled together until 1303, when they divided the land: Henry received Nassau-Siegen (Siegen, Ginsberg, Haiger, and the Westerwald), Emicho received Nassau-Hadamar and John received Nassau-Dillenburg. However, after the childless death of John, Nassau-Dillenburg (and the towns of Dillenburg, Herborn, and Beilstein) fell to Nassau-Siegen, which adopted the name Nassau-Dillenburg. Siegen and Dillenburg were united until 1606.
Emicho I	c.1285 Second son of Otto I, Count of Nassau and Agnes of Leiningen	1303 – 7 June 1334	County of Hadamar	Anna of Nuremberg before 1297 eight children	7 June 1334 aged 48–49	Sons of Otto I, ruled together until 1303, when they divided the land: Henry received Nassau-Siegen (Siegen, Ginsberg, Haiger, and the Westerwald), Emicho received Nassau-Hadamar and John received Nassau-Dillenburg. However, after the childless death of John, Nassau-Dillenburg (and the towns of Dillenburg, Herborn, and Beilstein) fell to Nassau-Siegen, which adopted the name Nassau-Dillenburg. Siegen and Dillenburg were united until 1606.
John	c.1285 Fourth son of Otto I, Count of Nassau and Agnes of Leiningen	1289/90 – 1303	County of Northern Nassau	Unmarried	10 August 1328 aged 42–43	Sons of Otto I, ruled together until 1303, when they divided the land: Henry received Nassau-Siegen (Siegen, Ginsberg, Haiger, and the Westerwald), Emicho received Nassau-Hadamar and John received Nassau-Dillenburg. However, after the childless death of John, Nassau-Dillenburg (and the towns of Dillenburg, Herborn, and Beilstein) fell to Nassau-Siegen, which adopted the name Nassau-Dillenburg. Siegen and Dillenburg were united until 1606.
John	c.1285 Fourth son of Otto I, Count of Nassau and Agnes of Leiningen	1303 – 10 August 1328	County of Dillenburg	Unmarried	10 August 1328 aged 42–43	Sons of Otto I, ruled together until 1303, when they divided the land: Henry received Nassau-Siegen (Siegen, Ginsberg, Haiger, and the Westerwald), Emicho received Nassau-Hadamar and John received Nassau-Dillenburg. However, after the childless death of John, Nassau-Dillenburg (and the towns of Dillenburg, Herborn, and Beilstein) fell to Nassau-Siegen, which adopted the name Nassau-Dillenburg. Siegen and Dillenburg were united until 1606.
Nassau-Dillenburg was annexed to Nassau-Siegen
Imagina of Isenburg-Limburg	1255; Limburg an der Lahn; Daughter of Gerlach IV, Count of Isenburg-Limburg and Imagina of Blieskastel	2 July 1298 – 29 September 1313	County of Southern Nassau (at Weilburg)	Adolph I 1270 eight children	29 September 1313; Wiesbaden aged 57–58	While Adolf's widow, Imagina, received a seat at Weilburg (which after her death returned to the family), the children of the couple ruled jointly. Waleran abdicated in 1316, and in 1344 Gerlach did the same to pass the rule to his two elder sons, as his brothers didn't have male heirs.
Rupert V	1280; Second son of Adolph I and Imagina of Isenburg-Limburg	2 July 1298 – 2 November 1304	County of Southern Nassau	Unmarried	2 November 1304 aged 23/24	While Adolf's widow, Imagina, received a seat at Weilburg (which after her death returned to the family), the children of the couple ruled jointly. Waleran abdicated in 1316, and in 1344 Gerlach did the same to pass the rule to his two elder sons, as his brothers didn't have male heirs.
Gerlach I	1285; Third son of Adolph I and Imagina of Isenburg-Limburg	2 July 1298 – 1344	County of Southern Nassau	Agnes of Hesse; 1307 seven children Irmgard of Hohenlohe-Weikersheim before 4 January 1337 two children	7 January 1361; Wiesbaden-Sonnenberg (?) aged 75/76	While Adolf's widow, Imagina, received a seat at Weilburg (which after her death returned to the family), the children of the couple ruled jointly. Waleran abdicated in 1316, and in 1344 Gerlach did the same to pass the rule to his two elder sons, as his brothers didn't have male heirs.
Waleran III	1294; Fifth son of Adolph I and Imagina of Isenburg-Limburg	2 July 1298 – 1316	County of Southern Nassau	Unmarried	22 December 1324 aged 29/30	While Adolf's widow, Imagina, received a seat at Weilburg (which after her death returned to the family), the children of the couple ruled jointly. Waleran abdicated in 1316, and in 1344 Gerlach did the same to pass the rule to his two elder sons, as his brothers didn't have male heirs.
John	c.1305 First son of Emicho I and Anna of Nuremberg	7 June 1334 – 20 January 1365	County of Hadamar	Elisabeth of Waldeck; 1331 ten children	20 January 1365 aged c.59/60	Children of Emicho I, ruled jointly.
Emicho II	c.1305 Second son of Emicho I and Anna of Nuremberg	7 June 1334 – 1 March 1359	County of Hadamar	Anna of Diez no children	1 March 1359 aged c. 53/54	Children of Emicho I, ruled jointly.
Otto II	1305; First son of Henry I and Adelaide of Sponheim-Heinsberg	July/August 1343 – December 1350 or January 1351	County of Siegen	Adelaide of Vianden; 23 December 1331 three children	December 1350/January 1351	Children of Henry I, divided the land: Otto inherited Siegen and Dillenburg, and Henry inherited Beilstein, partitioned from Dillenburg.
Henry I	1307; Second son of Henry I and Adelaide of Sponheim-Heinsberg	July/August 1343 – 28 October 1378	County of Beilstein	Imagina of Westerburg; 1339 three children	28 October 1378; Beilstein aged 70/71	Children of Henry I, divided the land: Otto inherited Siegen and Dillenburg, and Henry inherited Beilstein, partitioned from Dillenburg.
Adelaide of Vianden	c.1310 Daughter of Philip II, Count of Vianden and Adelaide of Arnsberg	December 1350 or January 1351 – 30 September 1376	County of Siegen (in Mengerskirchen and Tringenstein)	Otto II; 23 December 1331 three children	30 September 1376; Mengerskirchen (?) aged c.65/66	Heirs of Otto II. Adelaide, as Otto's widow, received seats Mengerskirchen and Tringenstein, while serving also as regent for her son John. After John attained majority, she continued her rule in her designated seats. During his long reign, John made lucrative acquisitions of various kinds and expanded the possessions of his family.
Regency of Adelaide of Vianden (1351-1362)						Heirs of Otto II. Adelaide, as Otto's widow, received seats Mengerskirchen and Tringenstein, while serving also as regent for her son John. After John attained majority, she continued her rule in her designated seats. During his long reign, John made lucrative acquisitions of various kinds and expanded the possessions of his family.
John I	1339; Son of Otto II and Adelaide of Vianden	December 1350 or January 1351 – 4 September 1416	County of Siegen	Margaret of the Mark; 30 November 1357 five children	4 September 1416; Herborn aged 76/77	Heirs of Otto II. Adelaide, as Otto's widow, received seats Mengerskirchen and Tringenstein, while serving also as regent for her son John. After John attained majority, she continued her rule in her designated seats. During his long reign, John made lucrative acquisitions of various kinds and expanded the possessions of his family.
Adolph I	1307; First son of Gerlach I, Count of Nassau and Agnes of Hesse	1344 – 25 November 1355	County of Southern Nassau	Margaret of Nuremberg; 1322 fourteen children	17 January 1370; Idstein aged 62/63	Children of Gerlach I. The eldest two (Adolph and John) ruled first together in Nassau. In 1355, they formalized a division of the land between them and their other brothers: Adolph inherited Idstein and passed it to his descendants.; John inherited Weilburg and passed it to his descendants.; Crato inherited Sonnenberg, died with no descendants, and was succeeded by his brother Rupert.; Rupert inherited his brother Crato's land of Sonnenberg, and, with no children left, passed it to his wife Anna.
Adolph I	1307; First son of Gerlach I, Count of Nassau and Agnes of Hesse	25 November 1355 – 17 January 1370	County of Idstein	Margaret of Nuremberg; 1322 fourteen children	17 January 1370; Idstein aged 62/63	
John I	1309; Second son of Gerlach I, Count of Nassau and Agnes of Hesse	1344 – 25 November 1355	County of Southern Nassau	Gertrude of Merenberg; 1333 one child Johanna of Saarbrücken; 1353 seven children	20 September 1371; Weilburg aged 61/62	
John I	1309; Second son of Gerlach I, Count of Nassau and Agnes of Hesse	25 November 1355 – 20 September 1371	County of Weilburg	Gertrude of Merenberg; 1333 one child Johanna of Saarbrücken; 1353 seven children	20 September 1371; Weilburg aged 61/62	
Crato	c.1340 First son of Gerlach I, Count of Nassau and Irmgard of Hohenlohe-Weikersheim	25 November 1355 – 19 September 1356	County of Sonnenberg	Unmarried	19 September 1356; Poitiers aged c.15/16	
Rupert (VI) the Warrior	c.1340 Second son of Gerlach I, Count of Nassau and Irmgard of Hohenlohe-Weikersheim	19 September 1356 – 4 September 1390	County of Sonnenberg	Anna of Nassau-Hadamar; 1362 no children	4 September 1390; Kirchheimbolanden aged c.49/50	
Elisabeth of Waldeck	c.1305 Daughter of Henry IV, Count of Waldeck and Adelaide of Cleves	1365 – 1381	County of Hadamar (at Ems)	John; 1331 ten children	c.1381 Ems (?) aged 75/76	Heirs of John. Elisabeth, as widow, ruled at Ems; the county was shared by their two children: Henry and Emicho. The mental disorder of Emicho led to an establishment of a regency led by his brother-in-law, Rupert, Count of Nassau-Sonnenberg, and probably then his widow, Emicho's sister Anna. Neither Emicho nor Henry left descendants, and the county was thus inherited by Anna.
Henry	c.1335 Hadamar; Fourth son of John and Elisabeth of Waldeck	1365 – 1368	County of Hadamar	Unmarried	1368; Hadamar aged c. 32/33	Heirs of John. Elisabeth, as widow, ruled at Ems; the county was shared by their two children: Henry and Emicho. The mental disorder of Emicho led to an establishment of a regency led by his brother-in-law, Rupert, Count of Nassau-Sonnenberg, and probably then his widow, Emicho's sister Anna. Neither Emicho nor Henry left descendants, and the county was thus inherited by Anna.
Emicho III	c.1335 Hadamar; Fifth son of John and Elisabeth of Waldeck	1365 – 1394	County of Hadamar	Unmarried	1394; Hadamar aged c. 58/59	Heirs of John. Elisabeth, as widow, ruled at Ems; the county was shared by their two children: Henry and Emicho. The mental disorder of Emicho led to an establishment of a regency led by his brother-in-law, Rupert, Count of Nassau-Sonnenberg, and probably then his widow, Emicho's sister Anna. Neither Emicho nor Henry left descendants, and the county was thus inherited by Anna.
Gerlach II	1333; First son of Adolph I and Margaret of Nuremberg	17 January 1370 – 1386	County of Idstein	Agnes of Veldenz c.1360 no children	1386; Idstein (?) aged 52/53	Children of Adolph I, divided the land: Gerlach kept Idstein and Waleran inherited Wiesbaden. Waleran reunited Idstein after his brother's death.
Waleran IV	1348 or 1354; Sixth son of Adolph I and Margaret of Nuremberg	17 January 1370 – 7 November 1393	County of Idstein (At Wiesbaden; 1370-86)	Bertha of Westerburg; 1374 two children	7 November 1393; Wiesbaden (?) aged 38/39 or 44/45	Children of Adolph I, divided the land: Gerlach kept Idstein and Waleran inherited Wiesbaden. Waleran reunited Idstein after his brother's death.
Johanna of Saarbrücken	1330; Saarbrücken; First daughter of John II, Count of Saarbrücken and Ghislette of Bar-Pierrefort	20 September 1371 – October 1381	County of Weilburg (at Neuweilnau)	John I, Count of Nassau-Weilburg; 1353 seven children	October 1381; Neuweilnau (?) aged 50/51	Joanna held her estate at Neuweilnau until her death; while providing the regency for her son on the rest of Weilburg; At his death, Philip would divide the land for his sons: the eldest received Nassau-Weilburg; the youngest, her original county of Saarbrücken.
Regencies of Johanna of Saarbrücken (1371-1381) and Frederick of Blankenheim, Bishop of Strasbourg (1381-1382)						Joanna held her estate at Neuweilnau until her death; while providing the regency for her son on the rest of Weilburg; At his death, Philip would divide the land for his sons: the eldest received Nassau-Weilburg; the youngest, her original county of Saarbrücken.
Philip I	1368; Weilburg; Son of John I and Johanna of Saarbrücken	20 September 1371 – 2 July 1429	County of Weilburg	Anna of Hohenlohe-Weikersheim; 1385 one child Elisabeth of Lorraine-Vaudémont; 1412 four children	2 July 1429; Wiesbaden aged 60/61	Joanna held her estate at Neuweilnau until her death; while providing the regency for her son on the rest of Weilburg; At his death, Philip would divide the land for his sons: the eldest received Nassau-Weilburg; the youngest, her original county of Saarbrücken.
Henry II	c.1340 Beilstein; First son of Henry I, Count of Nassau-Beilstein and Imagina of Westerburg	24 February 1378 – 12 October 1412	County of Beilstein	Catharina van Randerode; 1383 four children	12 October 1412; Beilstein aged 71/72	Sons of Henry I, ruled jointly.
Reinhard	c.1345 Beilstein; Second son of Henry I, Count of Nassau-Beilstein and Imagina of Westerburg	24 February 1378 – c.1415	County of Beilstein	Unmarried	c.1415 aged c.69/70?	Sons of Henry I, ruled jointly.
Anna	c.1350 Hadamar; Second daughter of John, Count of Nassau-Hadamar and Elisabeth of Waldeck	4 September 1390 – 21 January 1404	County of Sonnenberg	Rupert, Count of Nassau-Sonnenberg; 1362 no children	21 January 1404; Wiesbaden-Sonnenberg aged 53/54	Heir of her husband and her brother. In 1403, renounced the claims over Hadamar and, after her own death, Sonnenberg went to Weilburg line.
Anna	c.1350 Hadamar; Second daughter of John, Count of Nassau-Hadamar and Elisabeth of Waldeck	1394-1403	County of Hadamar	Rupert, Count of Nassau-Sonnenberg; 1362 no children	21 January 1404; Wiesbaden-Sonnenberg aged 53/54	Heir of her husband and her brother. In 1403, renounced the claims over Hadamar and, after her own death, Sonnenberg went to Weilburg line.
Nassau-Hadamar was annexed to Nassau-Siegen
Nassau-Sonnenberg was annexed to Nassau-Weilburg
Regency of Bertha of Westerburg (possibly) (1393-c.1400)						
Adolph II	1386; Son of Waleran IV, Count of Nassau-Idstein and Bertha of Westerburg	7 November 1393 – 16 July 1426	County of Idstein	Margaret of Baden; March 1418 six children	16 July 1426 aged 39/40	
John I	c.1400? First son of Henry I and Catharina van Randerode	1414/18 – July 1473	County of Beilstein	Matilda of Isenburg-Grenzau; 1415 four children Johanna von Gemen; 1477 one child	July 1473 aged 72/73	Sons of Henry II, ruled jointly.
Henry III	c.1400? Third son of Henry I andCatharina van Randerode	1414/18 – 12 September 1477	County of Beilstein	Unmarried	12 September 1477 aged 76/77	Sons of Henry II, ruled jointly.
Adolph I	1362; Dillenburg; First son of John I, Count of Nassau-Siegen and Margaret of the Mark	1388 – 12 June 1420	County of Diez	Judith of Diez (d.14 August 1397); 1384 one child Kunigunde of Isenburg-Limburg (d.15 March 1403); 1402 no children	12 June 1420; Diez (?) aged 57/58	Sons of John I, ruled jointly, as Tetrarchs. Counts Adolph and Engelbert inherited via his wives half of Diez and Breda, respectively, which became, after their deaths, part of Nassau patrimony.
Adolph I	1362; Dillenburg; First son of John I, Count of Nassau-Siegen and Margaret of the Mark	4 September 1416 – 1420	County of Siegen	Judith of Diez (d.14 August 1397); 1384 one child Kunigunde of Isenburg-Limburg (d.15 March 1403); 1402 no children	12 June 1420; Diez (?) aged 57/58	Sons of John I, ruled jointly, as Tetrarchs. Counts Adolph and Engelbert inherited via his wives half of Diez and Breda, respectively, which became, after their deaths, part of Nassau patrimony.
John II with the Helmet	c.1365 Dillenburg; Second son of John I, Count of Nassau-Siegen and Margaret of the Mark	4 September 1416 – May 1443	County of Siegen	Unmarried	May 1443; Dillenburg	Sons of John I, ruled jointly, as Tetrarchs. Counts Adolph and Engelbert inherited via his wives half of Diez and Breda, respectively, which became, after their deaths, part of Nassau patrimony.
Engelbert I	1370; Dillenburg; Third son of John I, Count of Nassau-Siegen and Margaret of the Mark	1403 – 3 May 1442	Barony of Breda	Johanna van Polanen; 1 August 1403; Breda six children	3 May 1442; Breda aged 71/72	Sons of John I, ruled jointly, as Tetrarchs. Counts Adolph and Engelbert inherited via his wives half of Diez and Breda, respectively, which became, after their deaths, part of Nassau patrimony.
Engelbert I	1370; Dillenburg; Third son of John I, Count of Nassau-Siegen and Margaret of the Mark	4 September 1416 – 3 May 1442	County of Siegen	Johanna van Polanen; 1 August 1403; Breda six children	3 May 1442; Breda aged 71/72	Sons of John I, ruled jointly, as Tetrarchs. Counts Adolph and Engelbert inherited via his wives half of Diez and Breda, respectively, which became, after their deaths, part of Nassau patrimony.
John III the Younger	1398; Dillenburg; Fifth son of John I, Count of Nassau-Siegen and Margaret of the Mark	4 September 1416 – 18 April 1430	County of Siegen	Unmarried	18 April 1430; Siegen (?)aged 31/32	Sons of John I, ruled jointly, as Tetrarchs. Counts Adolph and Engelbert inherited via his wives half of Diez and Breda, respectively, which became, after their deaths, part of Nassau patrimony.
Judith	c.1385 Siegen or Diez; Daughter of Adolf I, Count of Nassau-Siegen and Judith of Diez	12 June 1420 – 2 August 1424	County of Diez	Godfried VII, Lord of Eppstein-Münzenberg; 1401 five children	2 August 1424 aged 38/39	Inherited half of Diez (the other part was inherited by her uncles) and after her death passed to the Eppstein family. Nassau-Siegen eventually recovered parts of her share of Diez in 1530.
Diez annexed to County of Eppstein; Recovered to Nassau-Siegen in 1530
Regency of Margaret of Baden (1426-1433)						
John II	1419; Wiesbaden or Idstein; Son of Adolph II and Margaret of Baden	16 July 1426 – 9 May 1480	County of Idstein	Maria of Nassau-Siegen; 17 June 1437; Breda six children	9 May 1480; Wiesbaden or Idstein aged 60/61	
Regency of Elisabeth of Lorraine-Vaudémont (1429–1438)						Sons of Philip I, Philip II and John II divided their inheritance. Philip II was the eldest and received Nassau-Weilburg; John received Saarbrücken. Between 1464 and 1490, Philip II also served as regent for count John Louis in Saarbrücken, together with Duke Eberhard I of Württemberg, following the death of the count's mother and previous regent. Philip II also associated, later in his reign, his own son, John III, who predeceased him.
Philip II	12 March 1418; Weilburg; First son of Philip I and Elisabeth of Lorraine-Vaudémont	2 July 1429 – 19 March 1492	County of Weilburg	Margaret of Loon-Heinsberg; 25 September 1440 two children Veronica of Sayn-Wittgenstein; 1477 no children	19 March 1492; Mainz aged 74	Sons of Philip I, Philip II and John II divided their inheritance. Philip II was the eldest and received Nassau-Weilburg; John received Saarbrücken. Between 1464 and 1490, Philip II also served as regent for count John Louis in Saarbrücken, together with Duke Eberhard I of Württemberg, following the death of the count's mother and previous regent. Philip II also associated, later in his reign, his own son, John III, who predeceased him.
John III	27 June 1441; Weilburg; Son of Philip II and Margaret of Loon-Heinsberg	1472 – 15 July 1480	County of Weilburg	Elisabeth of Hesse the Beautiful; 1464 two children	15 July 1480; Weilburg aged 39	Sons of Philip I, Philip II and John II divided their inheritance. Philip II was the eldest and received Nassau-Weilburg; John received Saarbrücken. Between 1464 and 1490, Philip II also served as regent for count John Louis in Saarbrücken, together with Duke Eberhard I of Württemberg, following the death of the count's mother and previous regent. Philip II also associated, later in his reign, his own son, John III, who predeceased him.
John II	4 April 1423; Saarbrücken; Second son of Philip I, Count of Nassau-Weilburg and Elisabeth of Lorraine-Vaudémont	2 July 1429 – 15 July 1472	County of Saarbrücken	Johanna of Loon-Heinsberg; 30 November 1456 two children Elisabeth of Württemberg-Urach; 30 October 1470 one child	15 July 1472; Vehingen aged 49	Sons of Philip I, Philip II and John II divided their inheritance. Philip II was the eldest and received Nassau-Weilburg; John received Saarbrücken. Between 1464 and 1490, Philip II also served as regent for count John Louis in Saarbrücken, together with Duke Eberhard I of Württemberg, following the death of the count's mother and previous regent. Philip II also associated, later in his reign, his own son, John III, who predeceased him.
John IV	1 August 1410; Breda; First son of Engelbert I and Johanna van Polanen	3 May 1442 – 3 February 1475	Barony of Breda	Mary of Looz-Heinsberg; 7 February 1440 six children	3 February 1475; Dillenburg aged 64	Sons of Engelbert I, ruled jointly in Breda and Dillenburg until 1447. In this year they divided their lands: John kept Breda and Henry, Dillenburg. After the latter's death, the former reunited their possessions. Their sister Maria inherited some unknown possessions in the Netherlands (possibly in Breda), which she contested with her brother John, and possibly passed to Nassau-Idstein.
John IV	1 August 1410; Breda; First son of Engelbert I and Johanna van Polanen	3 May 1442 – 22 February 1447 18 January 1451 – 3 February 1475	County of Siegen	Mary of Looz-Heinsberg; 7 February 1440 six children	3 February 1475; Dillenburg aged 64	Sons of Engelbert I, ruled jointly in Breda and Dillenburg until 1447. In this year they divided their lands: John kept Breda and Henry, Dillenburg. After the latter's death, the former reunited their possessions. Their sister Maria inherited some unknown possessions in the Netherlands (possibly in Breda), which she contested with her brother John, and possibly passed to Nassau-Idstein.
Maria	2 February 1418; Breda; Second daughter of Engelbert I and Johanna van Polanen	3 May 1442 – 11 October 1472	Barony of Breda	John II; 17 June 1437; Breda six children	11 October 1472; Idstein aged 54	Sons of Engelbert I, ruled jointly in Breda and Dillenburg until 1447. In this year they divided their lands: John kept Breda and Henry, Dillenburg. After the latter's death, the former reunited their possessions. Their sister Maria inherited some unknown possessions in the Netherlands (possibly in Breda), which she contested with her brother John, and possibly passed to Nassau-Idstein.
Henry II	7 January 1414; Dillenburg; Second son of Engelbert I and Johanna van Polanen	3 May 1442 – 22 February 1447	Barony of Breda	Genoveva of Virneburg; 1435 one child Irmgard of Schleiden-Junkerath after 1437 no children	18 January 1451; Radicofani aged 37	Sons of Engelbert I, ruled jointly in Breda and Dillenburg until 1447. In this year they divided their lands: John kept Breda and Henry, Dillenburg. After the latter's death, the former reunited their possessions. Their sister Maria inherited some unknown possessions in the Netherlands (possibly in Breda), which she contested with her brother John, and possibly passed to Nassau-Idstein.
Henry II	7 January 1414; Dillenburg; Second son of Engelbert I and Johanna van Polanen	3 May 1442 – 18 January 1451	County of Siegen	Genoveva of Virneburg; 1435 one child Irmgard of Schleiden-Junkerath after 1437 no children	18 January 1451; Radicofani aged 37	Sons of Engelbert I, ruled jointly in Breda and Dillenburg until 1447. In this year they divided their lands: John kept Breda and Henry, Dillenburg. After the latter's death, the former reunited their possessions. Their sister Maria inherited some unknown possessions in the Netherlands (possibly in Breda), which she contested with her brother John, and possibly passed to Nassau-Idstein.
Margaret	1415; Dillenburg; First daughter of Engelbert I and Johanna van Polanen	3 May 1442 – 27 May 1467	County of Siegen (at Burbach)	Dietrich, Count of Sayn; 24 November 1435 no children	27 May 1467 aged 51/52	Sons of Engelbert I, ruled jointly in Breda and Dillenburg until 1447. In this year they divided their lands: John kept Breda and Henry, Dillenburg. After the latter's death, the former reunited their possessions. Their sister Maria inherited some unknown possessions in the Netherlands (possibly in Breda), which she contested with her brother John, and possibly passed to Nassau-Idstein.
Elisabeth	19 October 1459; Saarbrücken; First daughter of John II and Johanna of Loon-Heinsberg	15 July 1472 – 9 March 1479	County of Saarbrücken (at Heinsberg, Diest, Zichem and Zeelhem)	William IV, Duke of Jülich-Berg; 19 October 1472; Saarbrücken no children	9 March 1479 aged 19	Children of John II. John Louis inherited the county in general, and his sister Elisabeth received a particular rule over a group of towns, which, after her death with no descendants, was resold by her husband to the House of Nassau, but to the Breda branch.
Regencies of Elisabeth of Württemberg-Urach and Eberhard I, Duke of Württemberg (1472-1474), and Philip II, Count of Nassau-Weilburg (1474-1490)						Children of John II. John Louis inherited the county in general, and his sister Elisabeth received a particular rule over a group of towns, which, after her death with no descendants, was resold by her husband to the House of Nassau, but to the Breda branch.
John Louis	19 October 1472; Saarbrücken; Son of John II and Elisabeth of Württemberg-Urach	15 July 1472 – 4 June 1545	County of Saarbrücken	Elisabeth of Palatinate-Zweibrücken; 29 January 1492; Saarbrücken six children Catharina van Meurs-Saarwerden; 14 February 1507 nine children	4 June 1545; Saarbrücken aged 72	Children of John II. John Louis inherited the county in general, and his sister Elisabeth received a particular rule over a group of towns, which, after her death with no descendants, was resold by her husband to the House of Nassau, but to the Breda branch.
Engelbert II the Valorious	17 May 1451; Breda; First son of John IV and Maria of Looz-Heinsberg	3 February 1475 – 31 May 1504	Barony of Breda	[Cymburgis of Baden; 19 December 1468; Koblenz no children	31 May 1504; Brussels aged 53	Children of John IV, divided the land: Engelbert inherited Breda in the Netherlands (with the towns of Lek, Diest, Roosendaal en Nispen, Wouw, and Vianden) and John inherited Dillenburg (with the towns of Dillenburg, Siegen, Hadamar, Herborn, Vianden, Dietz). Both brothers were also Governor of the Habsburg Netherlands: Engelbert was a Stadtholder in Flanders (1499-1506) and Artois (1500-1504); John was Stadtholder in Guelders (1504-1505). Engelbert left no descendants, being succeeded by John's eldest son Henry III.
John V	9 November 1455; Breda; Second son of John IV and Maria of Looz-Heinsberg	3 February 1475 – 30 July 1516	County of Siegen	Elisabeth of Hesse-Marburg; 11 February 1481 six children	30 July 1516; Siegen aged 60	
Henry IV	1449; Beilstein; Son of John I and Johanna von Gemen	12 September 1477 – 26 May 1499	County of Beilstein	Eva of Sayn; 1464 ten children	26 May 1499; Beilstein aged 49/50	
Adolph III	10 November 1443; Wiesbaden; Second son of John II and Maria of Nassau-Siegen	9 May 1480 – 6 July 1511	County of Idstein (At Wiesbaden; 1480-1509)	Margaret of Hanau-Lichtenberg; 20 June 1484 four children	6 July 1511; Wiesbaden aged 67	Children of John II, divided the land: Philip kept Idstein and Adolph inherited Wiesbaden. Once more, the holder of Wiesbaden reunited the county. Adolph was also Stadtholder in Guelders (1481-1492).
Philip (I)	1450; Idstein; Fourth son of John II and Maria of Nassau-Siegen	9 May 1480 – 16 June 1509	County of Idstein (At Idstein proper)	Margaret of Palatinate-Zweibrücken; 1470 no children	16 June 1509; Idstein aged 58/59	Children of John II, divided the land: Philip kept Idstein and Adolph inherited Wiesbaden. Once more, the holder of Wiesbaden reunited the county. Adolph was also Stadtholder in Guelders (1481-1492).
Louis I	1473; Son of John III and Elisabeth of Hesse	19 March 1492 – 28 May 1523	County of Weilburg	Maria Margaretha of Nassau-Wiesbaden-Idstein; 19 April 1501 six children	28 May 1523; Weilburg aged 49/50	
John II	1475; Beilstein; First son of Henry IV and Eva of Sayn	26 May 1499 – 18 August 1513	County of Beilstein	Maria of Solms-Braunfels; 1492 four children Anna of Lippe; 1510 no children	18 August 1513; Beilstein aged 37/38	Children of Henry IV, ruled jointly.
Bernard	1479/85; Beilstein; Third son of Henry IV and Eva of Sayn	26 May 1499 – 10 May 1556	County of Beilstein	Unmarried	10 May 1556; Liebenscheid aged 70/71 or 76/77	Children of Henry IV, ruled jointly.
Henry III	12 January 1483; Siegen; First son of John V, Count of Nassau-Siegen and Elisabeth of Hesse-Marburg	31 May 1504 – 14 September 1538	Barony of Breda	Louise-Françoise of Savoy; 3 August 1503 no children Claudia of Chalon; May 1515 one child Mencía de Mendoza; 26 June 1524 one child	14 September 1538; Breda aged 55	Son of John V, inherited Nassau-Breda from his uncle Engelbrecht II. Also Stadtholder in Holland, Zeeland and Utrecht (1515-1521).
Philip I the Elder	26 April 1492; Cologne; Son of Adolph III and Margaret of Hanau-Lichtenberg	6 July 1511 – 1554	County of Idstein	Adriana van Glymes; 24 August 1514; Bergen op Zoom six children	6 June 1558; Idstein aged 66	Abdicated for his children, who divided the land once more.
John III	17 November 1495; Beilstein; Son of John II and Maria of Solms-Braunfels	10 May 1556 – 13 December 1561	County of Beilstein	Anna of Nassau-Weilburg; 1523 no children	13 December 1561; Beilstein aged	Ruled with his uncle, Bernard, since 18 August 1513 (his father's death). Had no descendants and after his death the county was annexed to Nassau-Dillenburg.
Nassau-Beilstein merged again in Nassau-Siegen
Elisabeth of Hesse-Marburg	May 1466; Marburg; First daughter of Henry III, Landgrave of Upper Hesse and Anna of Katzenelnbogen	30 July 1516 – 7/17 January 1523	County of Siegen (at Tringenstein)	John V 11 February 1481 six children	7 or 17 January 1523; Cologne aged 56	Heirs of John V. William inherited Nassau-Siegen, and gave his mother a seat at Tringenstein. During William's reign (1530), parts of Judith's half of Dietz were recovered. From 1557 he obtained the County of Katznelnbogen.
William I the Rich	10 April 1487; Dillenburg; Fourth son of John V and Elisabeth of Hesse-Marburg	30 July 1516 – 6 October 1559	County of Siegen	Walburga of Egmont; 29 October 1519; Koblenz two children Juliana of Stolberg; 29 September 1531; Königstein twelve children	6 October 1559; Dillenburgaged 72	Heirs of John V. William inherited Nassau-Siegen, and gave his mother a seat at Tringenstein. During William's reign (1530), parts of Judith's half of Dietz were recovered. From 1557 he obtained the County of Katznelnbogen.
Philip III	20 September 1504; Weilrod; Son of Louis I and Maria Margaretha of Nassau-Idstein	28 May 1523 – 4 October 1559	County of Weilburg	Elisabeth of Sayn-Hachenburg; 2 March 1523 four children Anna of Inner Mansfeld; 23 September 1536 one child Amalia of Isenburg-Büdingen; 17 August 1541; Büdingen three children	4 October 1559; Weilburg aged 55	
René	5 February 1519; Breda; Son of Henry III and Claudia of Chalon	14 September 1538 – 15 July 1544	Principality of Orange (1530–44); Barony of Breda (1538–44)	Anna of Lorraine; 22 August 1540; Bar-le-Duc one child	15 July 1544; Saint-Dizier aged 25	Son of Henry III, inherited Nassau-Breda from his father and the Principality of Orange from his mother. He was also Stadtholder in Holland, Zealand and Utrecht (1540-1544).Left no descendants, and gave his patrimony to his cousin.
William I the Silent	24 April 1533; Dillenburg; First son of William I, Count of Nassau-Siegen and Juliane of Stolberg-Wernigerode	15 July 1544 – 10 July 1584	Principality of Orange (with Barony of Breda)	Anna van Egmont; 8 July 1551; Buren three children Anna of Saxony; 24 August 1561; Leipzig (annulled 14 December 1571) five children Charlotte of Bourbon; 12 June 1575; Brielle six children Louise de Coligny; 12 April 1583; Antwerp one child	10 July 1584; Delft aged 51	Eldest son of William the Rich, inherited his cousin's lands, and left his father's inheritance to his younger brothers. Also Count of Katzenelnbogen, Vianden, Dietz, Buren and Leerdam and Lord of IJsselstein, Baron of Breda, etc. He was also Stadtholder in Holland, Zeeland and Utrecht (1559-1567 and 1572-1584) and Frisia and Drenthe (1580-1584). Murdered in 1584.
Philip II	25 July 1509; Saarbrücken; First son of John Louis and Catherine of Moers-Saarwerden	4 June 1545 – 19 June 1554	County of Saarbrücken	Apollonia Catherine of Leiningen-Hartenburg; 17 July 1535 no children	19 June 1554; Strasbourg aged 44	Left no descendants. He was succeeded by his brother.
John III	5 April 1511; Saarbrücken; Second son of John Louis and Catherine of Moers-Saarwerden	19 June 1554 – 23 November 1574	County of Saarbrücken	Unmarried	23 November 1574; Saarbrücken aged 63	Left no descendants. The land was absorbed by Nassau-Weilburg.
Nassau-Saarbrücken merged again in Nassau-Weilburg
Philip II the Younger	1516; Idstein; First son of Philip I and Adriana van Glymes	1554 – 3 January 1566	County of Idstein (At Wiesbaden; 1554-56 and 1564–66)	Unmarried	3 January 1566; Wiesbaden-Sonnenberg aged 49	Children of Philip I, divided the land. Adolph kept Idstein and Philip inherited Wiesbaden. After Adolph IV's death, Philip II reunited Idstein, but divided it again with another brother, Balthasar.
Adolph IV	1518; Idstein; Second son of Philip I and Adriana van Glymes	1554 – 5 January 1556	County of Idstein (At Idstein)	Franziska of Luxembourg-Brienne (1475-17 June 1566); 19 April 1543 four children	5 January 1556; Idstein aged 38	Children of Philip I, divided the land. Adolph kept Idstein and Philip inherited Wiesbaden. After Adolph IV's death, Philip II reunited Idstein, but divided it again with another brother, Balthasar.
Albert	26 December 1537; Weilburg; Son of Philip III and Anna of Inner Mansfeld	4 October 1559 – 11 November 1593	County of Weilburg (at Weilburg proper)	Anna of Nassau-Dillenburg; 23 September 1536 fourteen children	11 November 1593; Ottweiler aged 55	Sons of Philip I, ruled jointly. In 1574 annexed Nassau-Saarbrücken. Philip kept Neuweilnau until his death, which was then reabsorbed in Weilburg.
Philip IV	14 October 1542; Weilburg; Son of Philip III and Amalia of Isenburg-Büdingen	4 October 1559 – 12 March 1602	County of Weilburg (at Neuweilnau)	Erica of Manderscheid-Blankenheim; 9 April 1563 one child Elisabeth of Nassau-Dillenburg; 3 October 1583 no children	12 March 1602; Saarbrücken aged 59	Sons of Philip I, ruled jointly. In 1574 annexed Nassau-Saarbrücken. Philip kept Neuweilnau until his death, which was then reabsorbed in Weilburg.
John VI the Elder	22 November 1536; Dillenburg; Second son of William I, Count of Nassau-Siegen and Juliane of Stolberg-Wernigerode	6 October 1559 – 8 October 1606	County of Siegen	Elisabeth of Leuchtenberg; 6 June 1559; Dillenburg thirteen children Kunigunde Jakobäa of the Palatinate-Simmern; 13 September 1580; Dillenburg four children Johannetta of Sayn-Wittgenstein; 14 June 1586; Berleburg seven children	8 October 1606; Dillenburg aged 69	Younger brother of William the Silent, inherited his father's domains, which were divided after his own death. Also Stadtholder of Guelders (1578-1581).
Balthasar	1520; Idstein; Third son of Philip I and Adriana van Glymes	1564 – 11 January 1568	County of Idstein (with Wiesbaden since 1566)	Margaret of Isenburg-Birstein (4 December 1542 – 8 August 1613); 9 June/6 September 1564 one child	11 January 1568; Idstein aged 48	Brother of Adolph IV and Philip II. Definitely reunited Idstein.
Regency of Margaret of Isenburg-Birstein (1568-1587)						
John Louis I	10 April 1567; Idstein; Son of Balthasar and Margaret of Isenburg-Birstein	11 January 1568 – 10 June 1596	County of Idstein	Maria of Nassau-Siegen; 2 December 1588; Idstein six children	10 June 1596; Idstein aged 29	
Philip William	19 December 1554; Buren; Son of William I and Anna van Egmont	10 July 1584 – 20 February 1618	Principality of Orange (with Barony of Breda)	Éléonore de Bourbon; 23 November 1606; Fontainebleau no children	20 February 1618; Brussels aged 63	Left no descendants. He was succeeded by his half-brother Maurice.
Regency of Maria of Nassau-Siegen (1596-1605)						Died as minors. After John Louis' death, his lands were annexed to Nassau-Weilburg.
John Philip	26 March 1595; Idstein; First son of John Louis I and Maria of Nassau-Dillenburg	20 June 1596 – 29 August 1599	County of Idstein	Unmarried	29 August 1599; Idstein aged 4	Died as minors. After John Louis' death, his lands were annexed to Nassau-Weilburg.
John Louis II	21 May 1596; Idstein; Second son of John Louis I and Maria of Nassau-Dillenburg	29 August 1599 – 19 June 1605	County of Idstein	Unmarried	19 June 1605; Dillenburg aged 9	Died as minors. After John Louis' death, his lands were annexed to Nassau-Weilburg.
Nassau-Idstein merged again in Nassau-Weilburg
Anna of Nassau-Siegen	21 September 1541; Dillenburg; Third daughter of William I, Count of Nassau-Siegen and Juliane of Stolberg-Wernigerode	11 November 1593 – 12 February 1616	County of Weilburg (at Wehen)	Albert, Count of Nassau-Weilburg; 23 September 1536 fourteen children	12 February 1616; Weilburg aged 74	Heirs of Albert of Weilburg: Anna, his widow, inherited the town of Wehen, which passed to one of her daughters-in-law; Louis inherited Ottweiler.; William inherited Weilburg, which eventually passed to his brother Louis.; John Casimir inherited Gleiberg, which eventually passed to his brother Louis.; Louis reunited all Southern Nassau under Weilburg, but his sons divided it again.
Louis II	9 August 1565; Weilburg; First son of Albert and Anna of Nassau-Siegen	11 November 1593 – 19 November 1597 (as count of Ottweiler) 19 November 1597 – 8 November 1627 (as count of Weilburg)	County of Weilburg	Anna Maria of Hesse-Kassel; 8 June 1589; Kassel fourteen children	8 November 1627; Saarbrücken aged 62	Heirs of Albert of Weilburg: Anna, his widow, inherited the town of Wehen, which passed to one of her daughters-in-law; Louis inherited Ottweiler.; William inherited Weilburg, which eventually passed to his brother Louis.; John Casimir inherited Gleiberg, which eventually passed to his brother Louis.; Louis reunited all Southern Nassau under Weilburg, but his sons divided it again.
William	25 August 1570; Weilburg; Fourth son of Albert and Anna of Nassau-Siegen	11 November 1593 – 19 November 1597	County of Weilburg	Erica of Isenburg-Birstein; 29 January 1596; Birstein two children	19 November 1597; Burgschwalbach aged 27	Heirs of Albert of Weilburg: Anna, his widow, inherited the town of Wehen, which passed to one of her daughters-in-law; Louis inherited Ottweiler.; William inherited Weilburg, which eventually passed to his brother Louis.; John Casimir inherited Gleiberg, which eventually passed to his brother Louis.; Louis reunited all Southern Nassau under Weilburg, but his sons divided it again.
John Casimir	24 September 1577; Ottweiler; Fifth son of Albert and Anna of Nassau-Siegen	11 November 1593 – 29 March 1602	County of Weilburg (at Gleiberg)	Elisabeth of Hesse-Darmstadt; 10 May 1601; Weilburg one child	29 March 1602; Wehen aged 24	Heirs of Albert of Weilburg: Anna, his widow, inherited the town of Wehen, which passed to one of her daughters-in-law; Louis inherited Ottweiler.; William inherited Weilburg, which eventually passed to his brother Louis.; John Casimir inherited Gleiberg, which eventually passed to his brother Louis.; Louis reunited all Southern Nassau under Weilburg, but his sons divided it again.
William Louis	13 March 1560; Dillenburg; First son of John VI, Count of Nassau-Siegen and Elisabeth of Leuchtenberg	8 October 1606 – 13 July 1620	County of Dillenburg	Anna of Orange-Nassau; 25 November 1587; Franeker no children	13 July 1620; Leeuwarden aged 60	Children of John VI, divided the land: William Louis received Dillenburg, but left no descendants and was succeeded by his brother George. He was also Stadtholder in Frisia (1584-1620), Groningen (1594-1620), and Drenthe (1596-1620); John VII received Siegen, and passed it to his descendants, who divided it once more; George received Beilstein, and reunited it with Dillenburg after William Louis' death, passing both to his descendants; Ernest Casimir received Dietz, and passed it to his descendants. He was also Stadtholder in Frisia (1620-1632), Groningen and Drenthe (1625-1632); John Louis received Hadamar, and passed it to his descendants.
John VII the Middle	7 June 1561; Siegen; Second son of John VI and Elisabeth of Leuchtenberg	8 October 1606 – 27 September 1623	County of Siegen	Magdalene of Waldeck-Wildungen; 9 December 1581; Dillenburg twelve children Margaret of Schleswig-Holstein-Sonderburg; 27 August 1603; Dillenburg thirteen children	27 September 1623; Siegen aged 62	
George	1 September 1562; Dillenburg; Third son of John VI, Count of Nassau-Siegen and Elisabeth of Leuchtenberg	8 October 1606 – 9 August 1623	County of Beilstein (1606–23) County of Dillenburg (1620–23)	Anna Amalia of Nassau-Saarbrücken; 1584 fourteen children Amalia of Sayn-Wittgenstein; 1605 one child	9 August 1623; Dillenburg aged 60	
Ernest Casimir	22 December 1573; Dillenburg; Sixth son of John VI, Count of Nassau-Siegen and Elisabeth of Leuchtenberg	8 October 1606 – 2 June 1632	County of Dietz	Sophia Hedwig of Brunswick-Lüneburg; 8 June 1607; Dillenburg two children	2 June 1632; Roermond aged 58	
Regency of George II, Count of Sayn-Berleburg and John Albert I, Count of Solms-Braunfels (1606-1617)
John Louis	6 August 1590; Dillenburg; Second son of John VI, Count of Nassau-Siegen and Johannetta of Sayn-Wittgenstein	8 October 1606 – 10 March 1653	County of Hadamar (1606–50) Principality of Hadamar (1650–53)	Ursula of Lippe; 1617 fourteen children	10 March 1653; Hadamar aged 62	
Elisabeth of Hesse-Darmstadt	29 November 1579; Darmstadt; Second daughter of George I, Landgrave of Hesse-Darmstadt and Magdalene of Lippe	12 February 1616 – 17 July 1655	County of Weilburg (at Wehen)	John Casimir, Count of Nassau-Gleiberg; 10 May 1601; Weilburg one child	17 July 1655; Wehen aged 48	Widow of John Casimir, inherited from her mother-in-law her seat at Wehen. At her death, Wehen was inherited by Nassau-Idstein.
Maurice	14 November 1567; Dillenburg; Second son of William I and Anna of Saxony	20 February 1618 – 23 April 1625	Principality of Orange (with Barony of Breda)	Unmarried	23 April 1625; The Hague aged 57	He was also Stadtholder in Holland, Zeeland and Utrecht (1584-1625), Guelders and Overjissel (1590-1625) and Groningen and Drenthe (1620-1625). Left no descendants. He was succeeded by his half-brother Frederick Henry.
John VIII the Younger	29 September 1583; Dillenburg; Second son of John VII and Magdalene of Waldeck-Wildungen	27 September 1623 – 27 July 1638	County of Siegen (Catholic branch)	Ernestine Yolande de Ligne; 13 August 1618; Brussels thirteen children	27 July 1638; Ronse aged 54	Sons of John VII, divided the land once more, this time in religious matters: John VIII converted to Catholicism and received the part of the county south of the river Sieg and the original castle in Siegen (which after 1695 was called the "Upper Castle").; John Maurice remained Protestant, and received the part of the county north of the Sieg, and was also governor of Dutch Brazil and later of the Prussian province of Cleves, Mark, and Ravensberg. He also conquered the Freudenberg and Netphen districts from his half-brother John VIII, but lost them again four years later. Between 1638 and 1674, his brother George Frederick of Nassau-Siegen ruled his part of the country.; William received the district of Hilchenbach from John VIII, and also the Ferndorf and Krombach districts 1632–1636. After his own death his districts went back to the Catholic main line.
William	13 August 1592; Dillenburg; Fifth son of John VII and Magdalene of Waldeck-Wildungen	1624 – 17 July 1642	County of Siegen (Protestant branch, at Hilchenbach)	Christiane of Erbach; 17 January 1619; Siegen seven children	17 July 1642; Orsoy aged 49	
John Maurice the Brazilian	17 June 1604; Dillenburg; First son of John VII and Margaret of Schleswig-Holstein-Sonderburg	1632 – 20 December 1679	County of Siegen (Protestant branch, 1632–64) Principality of Siegen (Protestant branch, 1664–79)	Unmarried	20 December 1679; Kleve aged 75	
Louis Henry	9 May 1594; Saarbrücken; Sixth son of George and Anna Amalia of Nassau-Saarbrücken	9 August 1623 – 12 July 1662	County of Dillenburg (1623–54) Principality of Dillenburg (1654–62)	Catherine of Sayn-Wittgenstein; 1615 twelve children Elizabeth of Salm-Dhaun; 1653 no children Sophia Margaretha of Nassau-Hadamar; 1656 three children	12 July 1662; Dillenburg aged 68	Sons of George, ruled jointly.
Albert	1 November 1596; Dillenburg; Eighth son of George and Anna Amalia of Nassau-Saarbrücken	9 August 1623 – 16 June 1626	County of Dillenburg	Unmarried	16 June 1626; Quakenbrück aged 29	Sons of George, ruled jointly.
Frederick Henry	29 January 1584; Delft; Son of William I and Louise de Coligny	23 April 1625 – 14 March 1647	Principality of Orange (with Barony of Breda)	Amalia of Solms-Braunfels; 4 April 1625; The Hague nine children	14 March 1647; The Hague aged 63	He was also Stadtholder in Holland, Zeeland, Utrecht, Guelders and Overjissel (1625-1647) and Groningen and Drenthe (1640-1647).
William Louis	18 December 1590; Ottweiler; First son of Louis II, Count of Nassau-Weilburg and Anna Maria of Hesse-Kassel	8 November 1627 – 22 August 1640	County of Saarbrücken	Anna Amalia of Baden-Durlach; 25 November 1615; Durlach twelve children	22 August 1640; Metz aged 49	Children of Louis II, divided the land: William Louis received Saarbrücken; John received Idstein, and (from 1651) Wiesbaden, Sonnenberg, Wehen, Burg-Schwalbach and Lahr. From 1675 he also served as regent for his nephew, John Ernest of Weilburg.; Ernest Casimir received Weilburg.
John	24 November 1603; Saarbrücken; Seventh son of Louis II, Count of Nassau-Weilburg and Anna Maria of Hesse-Kassel	8 November 1627 – 23 May 1677	County of Idstein	Sibylla Magdalena of Baden-Durlach; 6 June 1629; Strasbourg nine children Anna of Leiningen-Dagsburg-Falkenburg; 6 December 1646; Strasbourg seventeen children	23 May 1677; Idstein aged 73	Children of Louis II, divided the land: William Louis received Saarbrücken; John received Idstein, and (from 1651) Wiesbaden, Sonnenberg, Wehen, Burg-Schwalbach and Lahr. From 1675 he also served as regent for his nephew, John Ernest of Weilburg.; Ernest Casimir received Weilburg.
Ernest Casimir	15 November 1607; Saarbrücken; Eighth son of Louis II and Anna Maria of Hesse-Kassel	8 November 1627 – 16 April 1655	County of Weilburg	Anna Maria of Sayn-Wittgenstein-Hachenburg; 22 February 1634; Weilburg six children	16 April 1655; Weilburg aged 47	Children of Louis II, divided the land: William Louis received Saarbrücken; John received Idstein, and (from 1651) Wiesbaden, Sonnenberg, Wehen, Burg-Schwalbach and Lahr. From 1675 he also served as regent for his nephew, John Ernest of Weilburg.; Ernest Casimir received Weilburg.
Henry Casimir I	21 January 1612; Arnhem; Fourth son of Ernest Casimir I and Sophie Hedwig of Brunswick-Wolfenbüttel	2 June 1632 – 13 July 1640	County of Dietz	Unmarried	13 July 1640; Hulst aged 28	Also Stadtholder in Frisia, Groningen and Drenthe. Left no descendants. He was succeeded by his brother.
Regency of Ernestine Yolande de Ligne (1638-1651)						Had to cede a part of the county to the Protestant branch of the family in 1648. He kept fighting his Protestant neighbours and suppressing the Calvinists in his territory. His reign was marked by bad management and debts. However, in 1652, he was elevated to Imperial Prince. He was also Stadtholder in Limburg (1665-1684) and Upper Guelders (1680-1699).
John Francis Desideratus	28 July 1627; Nozeroy; Son of John VIII and Ernestine Yolande de Ligne	27 July 1638 – 17 November 1699	County of Siegen (Catholic branch, 1638–52) Principality of Siegen (Catholic branch, 1652–99)	Johanna Claudia of Königsegg-Rotenfels-Aulendorf; 14 May 1651; Vienna ten children Marie Eleonore Sophie of Baden-Rodemachern; 31 May 1665; Rodemachern four children Isabella Clara du Puget de la Serre; 9 February 1669; Brussels ten children	17 November 1699; Roermond aged 72	Had to cede a part of the county to the Protestant branch of the family in 1648. He kept fighting his Protestant neighbours and suppressing the Calvinists in his territory. His reign was marked by bad management and debts. However, in 1652, he was elevated to Imperial Prince. He was also Stadtholder in Limburg (1665-1684) and Upper Guelders (1680-1699).
William Frederick	7 August 1613; Arnhem; Fourth son of Ernest Casimir I and Sophie Hedwig of Brunswick-Wolfenbüttel	13 July 1640 – 31 October 1664	County of Dietz (1632–54) Principality of Dietz (1654–64)	Albertine Agnes of Orange-Nassau; 2 May 1652; Kleve three children	31 October 1664; Leeuwarden aged 51	Also Stadtholder in Frisia (1640-1664), Groningen and Drenthe (1650-1664).
Regency of Anna Amalia of Baden-Durlach (1638-1642)						Anna Amalia exerted regency of her son Crato, and, after his death, took the County of Saarwerden, while regent in the name of her second son in Saarbrücken. After her death, Saarwerden reunited with Saarbrücken. In 1659, John Louis divided the land with his other brothers, in which he received Ottweiler. Count of Nassau-Saarbrücken and (1659–80) in Ottweiler, Jungenheim, and Wöllstein. Between 1677 and 1680 he also served as regent for Count John Ernest of Nassau-Weilburg.
Crato	7 April 1621; Second son of William Louis, Count of Nassau-Saarbrücken and Anna Amalia of Baden-Durlach	22 August 1640 – 25 July 1642	County of Saarbrücken	Unmarried	25 July 1642	Anna Amalia exerted regency of her son Crato, and, after his death, took the County of Saarwerden, while regent in the name of her second son in Saarbrücken. After her death, Saarwerden reunited with Saarbrücken. In 1659, John Louis divided the land with his other brothers, in which he received Ottweiler. Count of Nassau-Saarbrücken and (1659–80) in Ottweiler, Jungenheim, and Wöllstein. Between 1677 and 1680 he also served as regent for Count John Ernest of Nassau-Weilburg.
Anna Amalia of Baden-Durlach	9 July 1595; Durlach; Second daughter of George Frederick, Margrave of Baden-Durlach and Juliana Ursula of Salm-Neuville	25 July 1642 – 18 November 1651	County of Saarbrücken (at Saarwerden)	William Louis, Count of Nassau-Saarbrücken; 25 November 1615; Durlach twelve children	18 November 1651; Saarbrücken aged 56	Anna Amalia exerted regency of her son Crato, and, after his death, took the County of Saarwerden, while regent in the name of her second son in Saarbrücken. After her death, Saarwerden reunited with Saarbrücken. In 1659, John Louis divided the land with his other brothers, in which he received Ottweiler. Count of Nassau-Saarbrücken and (1659–80) in Ottweiler, Jungenheim, and Wöllstein. Between 1677 and 1680 he also served as regent for Count John Ernest of Nassau-Weilburg.
Regency of Anna Amalia of Baden-Durlach (1642-1651)						Anna Amalia exerted regency of her son Crato, and, after his death, took the County of Saarwerden, while regent in the name of her second son in Saarbrücken. After her death, Saarwerden reunited with Saarbrücken. In 1659, John Louis divided the land with his other brothers, in which he received Ottweiler. Count of Nassau-Saarbrücken and (1659–80) in Ottweiler, Jungenheim, and Wöllstein. Between 1677 and 1680 he also served as regent for Count John Ernest of Nassau-Weilburg.
John Louis	23 May 1625; Saarbrücken; Third son of William Louis, Count of Nassau-Saarbrücken and Anna Amalia of Baden-Durlach	25 July 1642 – 1659	County of Saarbrücken	Dorothea Catherine of Palatinate-Bischweiler; 6 October 1649; Bischweiler eight children	9 February 1690; Reichelsheim aged 64	Anna Amalia exerted regency of her son Crato, and, after his death, took the County of Saarwerden, while regent in the name of her second son in Saarbrücken. After her death, Saarwerden reunited with Saarbrücken. In 1659, John Louis divided the land with his other brothers, in which he received Ottweiler. Count of Nassau-Saarbrücken and (1659–80) in Ottweiler, Jungenheim, and Wöllstein. Between 1677 and 1680 he also served as regent for Count John Ernest of Nassau-Weilburg.
John Louis	23 May 1625; Saarbrücken; Third son of William Louis, Count of Nassau-Saarbrücken and Anna Amalia of Baden-Durlach	1659 – 9 February 1690	County of Ottweiler	Dorothea Catherine of Palatinate-Bischweiler; 6 October 1649; Bischweiler eight children	9 February 1690; Reichelsheim aged 64	Anna Amalia exerted regency of her son Crato, and, after his death, took the County of Saarwerden, while regent in the name of her second son in Saarbrücken. After her death, Saarwerden reunited with Saarbrücken. In 1659, John Louis divided the land with his other brothers, in which he received Ottweiler. Count of Nassau-Saarbrücken and (1659–80) in Ottweiler, Jungenheim, and Wöllstein. Between 1677 and 1680 he also served as regent for Count John Ernest of Nassau-Weilburg.
William II	27 May 1626; The Hague; Son of Frederick Henry and Amalia of Solms-Braunfels	14 March 1647 – 6 November 1650	Principality of Orange (with Barony of Breda)	2 May 1641; London one child	6 November 1650; The Hague aged 24	He was also Stadtholder in Holland, Zeeland, Utrecht, Guelders, Overjissel, Groningen and Drenthe.
Mary of Great Britain	4 November 1631; Westminster, London; First daughter of Charles I of England and Henrietta Maria of France	6 November 1650 – 24 December 1660	Barony of Breda	2 May 1641; London one child	24 December 1660; Westminster, London aged 29	Given her inherited seat in Breda, she may have had the entire hereditary barony, which passed then to her son.
Regencies of Mary of Great Britain (1650-1660) and Amalia of Solms-Braunfels (1650-1672)						Also Stadtholder in Holland, Zeeland and Utrecht (1672-1702), Guelders and Overjissel (1675-1702), and Drenthe (1696-1702). Became King of England and Scotland (Great Britain) in 1688, jointly with his wife. Left no descendants. He named his cousin John William Friso of Nassau-Dietz as his heir in The Netherlands and the principality of Orange, passing over the claims of the Hohenzollerns of Brandenburg/Prussia.
William III	4 November 1650; The Hague; Son of William II and Mary of Great Britain	6 November 1650 – 8 March 1702	Principality of Orange (with Barony of Breda from 1660)	Mary II, Queen of Great Britain; 4 November 1677; Kensington, London no children	8 March 1702; London aged 51	Also Stadtholder in Holland, Zeeland and Utrecht (1672-1702), Guelders and Overjissel (1675-1702), and Drenthe (1696-1702). Became King of England and Scotland (Great Britain) in 1688, jointly with his wife. Left no descendants. He named his cousin John William Friso of Nassau-Dietz as his heir in The Netherlands and the principality of Orange, passing over the claims of the Hohenzollerns of Brandenburg/Prussia.
Principality of Orange (and Breda) inherited by Nassau-Dietz
In 1702, the Nassau-Dietz branch followed the House of Orange that had become extinct with William III of England (d. 1702). The counts of Nassau-Dietz not only descended from William the Silent's brother, but in female line also from himself, as William Frederick, Prince of Nassau-Dietz, had married Countess Albertine Agnes of Nassau, the fifth daughter of Frederick Henry, Prince of Orange in 1652.
Maurice Henry	23 April 1626; Hadamar; Son of John Louis and Ursula of Lippe	10 March 1653 – 24 January 1679	Principality of Hadamar	Ernestine Charlotte of Nassau-Siegen; 30 January 1650; Siegen six children Maria Leopoldine of Nassau-Siegen; 12 August 1669; Siegen three children Anna Louise of Manderscheid-Blankenheim; 24 October 1675; Hachenburg six children	24 January 1679; Hadamar aged 52	
Frederick	26 April 1640; Metz; Son of Ernest Casimir and Anna Maria of Sayn-Wittgenstein-Hachenburg	16 April 1655 – 8 September 1675	County of Weilburg	Christiane Elisabeth of Sayn-Homburg; 26 May 1663 three children	8 September 1675; Weilburg aged 35	
Gustav Adolph	27 March 1632; Saarbrücken; Fifth son of William Louis, Count of Nassau-Saarbrücken and Anna Amalia of Baden-Durlach	1659 – 9 October 1677	County of Saarbrücken	Eleonora Clara of Hohenlohe-Neuenstein; 14 June 1662 seven children	9 October 1677; Strasbourg aged 45	Brothers of John Louis of Nassau-Saarbrücken (who retired to rule Ottweiler only), they divided the land: Gustav kept Saarbrücken, and Waleran inherited Usingen.
Walrad	25 February 1635; Roermond; Seventh son of William Louis, Count of Nassau-Saarbrücken and Anna Amalia of Baden-Durlach	1659 – 17 October 1702	County of Usingen (1659–88) Principality of Usingen (1688-1702)	Catherine Françoise of Croÿ-Roeulx; 16 June 1678; Mechelen three children Magdalena Elizabeth of Löwenstein-Wertheim-Rochefort; 1686 no children	17 October 1702; Usingen aged 66	Brothers of John Louis of Nassau-Saarbrücken (who retired to rule Ottweiler only), they divided the land: Gustav kept Saarbrücken, and Waleran inherited Usingen.
Henry	28 August 1641; Dillenburg; Son of George Louis, Heir of Dillenburg and Anna Augusta of Brunswick-Wolfenbüttel	12 July 1662 – 18 April 1701	Principality of Dillenburg	Dorothea Elizabeth of Brieg; 13 October 1663 sixteen children	18 April 1701; Ludwigsbrunn im Tiergarten aged	Henry was a grandson of Louis Henry, as son of George Louis, Heir of Nassau-Dillenburg. Adolph, son of Louis Henry, ruled at Holzappel and Schaumburg. Adolph passed his fief to his youngest daughter.
Adolph	23 January 1629; Dillenburg; Son of Louis Henry and Catherine of Sayn-Wittgenstein	12 July 1662 – 19 December 1676	Principality of Dillenburg (at Schaumburg)	Elisabeth Charlotte, Countess of Holzappel; 1653 eight children	19 December 1676; Hadamar aged 47	Henry was a grandson of Louis Henry, as son of George Louis, Heir of Nassau-Dillenburg. Adolph, son of Louis Henry, ruled at Holzappel and Schaumburg. Adolph passed his fief to his youngest daughter.
Regency of Albertine Agnes of Orange-Nassau (1664-1677)						Also Stadtholder in Frisia, Groningen and Drenthe.
Henry Casimir II	18 January 1657; The Hague; Son of William Frederick and Albertine Agnes of Orange-Nassau	31 October 1664 – 25 March 1696	Principality of Dietz	Henriëtte Amalia of Anhalt-Dessau; 26 November 1683; Dessau nine children	25 March 1696; Leeuwarden aged 39	Also Stadtholder in Frisia, Groningen and Drenthe.
Regencies of John, Count of Nassau-Idstein (1675-1677) and John Louis, Count of Nassau-Ottweiler (1677-1680)						
John Ernest	13 June 1664; Weilburg; Son of Frederick and Christiane Elisabeth of Sayn-Homburg	8 September 1675 – 27 February 1719	County of Weilburg	Maria Polyxena of Leiningen-Hardenburg; 3 April 1683 nine children	27 February 1719; Heidelberg aged 54	
Regency of Elisabeth Charlotte, Countess of Holzappel (1676-1690)						Youngest daughter of Adolf, was his heiress to the lordship of Schuaumburg, which through her marriage was inherited by Anhalt.
Charlotte	28 September 1673; Northrhine-Westphalia; Sixth daughter of Adolph and Elisabeth Charlotte, Countess of Holzappel	19 December 1676 – 31 January 1700	Principality of Dillenburg (at Schaumburg)	Lebrecht, Prince of Anhalt-Zeitz-Hoym; 12 April 1692; Schaumburg five children	31 January 1700; Bernburg aged 27	Youngest daughter of Adolf, was his heiress to the lordship of Schuaumburg, which through her marriage was inherited by Anhalt.
Schaumburg annexed to Anhalt-Bernburg-Schaumburg-Hoym
Louis Crato	28 March 1663; Saarbrücken; First son of Gustav Adolph and Eleonora Clara of Hohenlohe-Neuenstein	9 October 1677 – 14 February 1713	County of Saarbrücken	Philippine Henriette of Hohenlohe-Langenburg; 25 April 1699 eight children	14 February 1713; Saarbrücken aged 49	Left no male descendants. He was succeeded by his brother Charles Louis.
George August	26 February 1665; Idstein; Son of John and Anna of Leiningen-Dagsburg	23 May 1677 – 26 October 1721	County of Idstein (1677–88) Principality of Idstein (1688-1721)	Henriette Dorothea of Oettingen; 22 September 1688; Kirchheim unter Teck twelve children	26 October 1721; Biebrich aged 66	
Nassau-Idstein was annexed by Nassau-Saarbrücken
Regency of Francis Bernard of Nassau-Hadamar (1679-1694)						Left no surviving descendants, and his lands were divided by Nassau-Siegen, Nassau-Dillenburg and Nassau-Diez in 1717.
Francis Alexander	27 January 1674; Hadamar; Son of Maurice Henry and Maria Leopoldine of Nassau-Siegen	24 January 1679 – 27 May 1711	Principality of Hadamar	Elizabeth Catherine Felicitas of Hesse-Rotenburg; 18 October 1695; Lovosice (annulled 1705) fourteen children	27 May 1711; Hadamar aged 37	Left no surviving descendants, and his lands were divided by Nassau-Siegen, Nassau-Dillenburg and Nassau-Diez in 1717.
Nassau-Hadamar divided between Nassau-Dietz, Nassau-Dillenburg and Nassau-Siegen
William Maurice	18/28 January 1649; Terbog	20 December 1679 – 23 January 1691	Principality of Siegen (Protestant branch)	Ernestine Charlotte of Nassau-Schaumburg; 6 February 1678; Schaumburg two children	23 January 1691; Siegen aged 41/42	
Regency of Ernestine Charlotte of Nassau-Schaumburg (1691-1701)						
Frederick William Adolf	20 February 1680; Siegen; Son of William Maurice and Ernestine Charlotte of Nassau-Schaumburg	23 January 1691 – 13 February 1722	Principality of Siegen (Protestant branch)	Elisabeth Juliana Francisca of Hesse-Homburg; 7 January 1702 five children Amalie Louise of Courland; 13 April 1708 eight children	13 February 1722; Siegen aged 41	
Regency of Henriëtte Amalia of Anhalt-Dessau (1696-1708)						In 1702 became the heir of William III of Orange and thus the founder of the younger House of Orange-Nassau and of the Dutch royal family. However, he had to split the Dutch properties with the King of Prussia who also descended from William I. Also Stadtholder in Frisia and Groningen.
John William Friso	14 August 1687; Dessau; Son of Henry Casimir II and Henriëtte Amalia of Anhalt-Dessau	25 March 1696 – 14 July 1711	Principality of Dietz (as Nassau-Dietz, 1696–1702; as Orange-Nassau, 1702–11) Principality of Orange; Barony of Breda (as Orange-Nassau, 1702–11)	Marie Louise of Hesse-Kassel; 26 April 1709; Kassel two children	14 July 1711; Hollands Diep aged 23	In 1702 became the heir of William III of Orange and thus the founder of the younger House of Orange-Nassau and of the Dutch royal family. However, he had to split the Dutch properties with the King of Prussia who also descended from William I. Also Stadtholder in Frisia and Groningen.
William Hyacinth	3 April 1667; Brussels; Son of John Francis Desideratus and Eleonore Sophie of Baden-Rodemachern	17 December 1699 – 18 February 1743	Principality of Siegen (Catholic branch)	Maria Francisca of Fürstenberg-Heiligenberg; 9 April 1687; Liège three children Maria Anna Josepha of Hohenlohe-Schillingsfürst; 22 May 1698; Frankfurt one child Maria Eva Sophia von Starhemberg; 28 July 1740; Vienna no children	18 April 1743; Hadamar aged 76	Son of John Francis Desideratus. Mismanaged the government of the principality and was removed from executive power 1707–1740. He inherited 1/6 of Nassau-Hadamar in 1711 and 1/2 of Nassau-Dillenburg in 1739. He ceded his part of Nassau-Dillenburg to William IV of Orange-Nassau in 1742 and received the latter's part of Nassau-Hadamar in return. He was succeeded by William IV of Orange-Nassau.
William II	28 August 1670; Dillenburg; Second son of Henry and Dorothea Elizabeth of Brieg	18 April 1701 – 21 September 1724	Principality of Dillenburg	Johanna Dorothea of Schleswig-Holstein-Sonderburg-Plön-Norburg; 13 January 1699; Harzgerode two children	21 September 1724; Dillenburg aged 54	Left no surviving descendants. He was succeeded by his brother.
William Henry	2 May 1684 's-Hertogenbosch; Son of Walrad and Catherine Françoise of Croÿ-Roeulx	17 October 1702 – 14 February 1718	Principality of Usingen	Charlotte Amalia of Nassau-Dillenburg; 15 April 1706; Dillenburg nine children	14 February 1718; Usingen aged 33	
Regency of Marie Louise of Hesse-Kassel (1711-1729)						Inherited a number of Nassau territories besides his paternal Nassau-Dietz. He reunited all of the German possessions of the Ottonian Line of his family in his hand, renaming his county Nassau-Dillenburg, and styling himself Prince of Orange and Nassau. Also Stadtholder in Frisia and Groningen (1711-1747), Drenthe and Guelders (1722-1747) and Overjissel (1747). In 1747 reunited all the Stadtholderates under his rule, becoming the first Hereditary Stadtholder.
William IV	1 September 1711; Leeuwarden; Son of John William Friso and Marie Louise of Hesse-Kassel	1 September 1711 – 22 October 1751	Principality of Orange (in Barony of Breda only from 1713) Principality of Dietz (as Orange-Nassau)	Anne of Great Britain; 25 March 1734; London three children	22 October 1751; The Hague aged 40	Inherited a number of Nassau territories besides his paternal Nassau-Dietz. He reunited all of the German possessions of the Ottonian Line of his family in his hand, renaming his county Nassau-Dillenburg, and styling himself Prince of Orange and Nassau. Also Stadtholder in Frisia and Groningen (1711-1747), Drenthe and Guelders (1722-1747) and Overjissel (1747). In 1747 reunited all the Stadtholderates under his rule, becoming the first Hereditary Stadtholder.
In 1713, Orange was annexed to France. From 1713, the use of the title was merely nominal
Charles Louis	6 January 1665; Saarbrücken; Second son of Gustav Adolph and Eleonora Clara of Hohenlohe-Neuenstein	14 February 1713 – 6 December 1723	County of Saarbrücken	Christiane Charlotte of Nassau-Ottweiler; 22 April 1713; Saarbrücken two children	6 December 1723; Idstein aged 58	Left no descendants. The land went to his cousin from Nassau-Ottweiler.
Charles August	17 September 1685; Weilburg; Son of John Ernest and Maria Polyxena of Leiningen-Hardenburg	27 February 1719 – 9 November 1753	County of Weilburg	Augusta Friederike of Nassau-Idstein; 17 August 1723; Wiesbaden seven children	9 November 1753; Weilburg aged 68	
Regency of Amalie Louise of Courland (1722-1726)						Left no surviving male descendants. After his death (which determined the extinction of the line) in 1734, Emperor Charles VI transferred the Protestant county of Nassau-Siegen to the House of Orange-Nassau as the inheritors.
Frederick William	11 November 1706; Siegen; Son of Frederick William Adolf and Elisabeth Juliana Francisca of Hesse-Homburg	13 February 1722 – 2 March 1734	Principality of Siegen (Protestant branch)	Sophie Polyxena Concordia of Sayn-Wittgenstein-Hohenstein; 23 September 1728 five children	11 November 1734; Siegen aged 27	Left no surviving male descendants. After his death (which determined the extinction of the line) in 1734, Emperor Charles VI transferred the Protestant county of Nassau-Siegen to the House of Orange-Nassau as the inheritors.
Nassau-Siegen was annexed by Nassau-Dillenburg and Nassau-Dietz
Frederick Louis	13 November 1651; Ottweiler; Son of John Louis and Dorothea Catherine of Palatinate-Birkenfeld-Bischweiler	9 February 1690 – 6 December 1723	County of Ottweiler	Christiane van Ahlefeldt; 28 July 1680 eight children Louise Sophie of Hanau-Lichtenberg; 27 September 1697 no children	25 May 1728; Saarbrücken aged 76	Count of Nassau-Ottweiler (1680–1728), in Rixingen (1703–28), Idstein (1721–28), and in Wiesbaden, etc. (1723–28). In 1723 inherited Saarbrücken, reuniting Ottweiler with the newly inherited land. After his death, Saarbrücken briefly mergen with Nassau-Usingen.
Frederick Louis	13 November 1651; Ottweiler; Son of John Louis and Dorothea Catherine of Palatinate-Birkenfeld-Bischweiler	6 December 1723 – 25 May 1728	County of Saarbrücken	Christiane van Ahlefeldt; 28 July 1680 eight children Louise Sophie of Hanau-Lichtenberg; 27 September 1697 no children	25 May 1728; Saarbrücken aged 76	Count of Nassau-Ottweiler (1680–1728), in Rixingen (1703–28), Idstein (1721–28), and in Wiesbaden, etc. (1723–28). In 1723 inherited Saarbrücken, reuniting Ottweiler with the newly inherited land. After his death, Saarbrücken briefly mergen with Nassau-Usingen.
Nassau-Ottweiler merged again in Nassau-Saarbrücken
Christian	12 August 1688; Dillenburg; Eighth son of Henry and Dorothea Elizabeth of Brieg	21 September 1724 – 28 August 1739	Principality of Dillenburg	Isabella Charlotte of Nassau-Dietz; 1725 no children	28 August 1739; Straßebersbach aged 51	Left no surviving descendants and his lands were inherited by Nassau-Dietz and catholic Nassau-Siegen.
Nassau-Dillenburg was inherited by Orange-Nassau (Nassau-Dietz) and catholic Nassau-Siegen
Regency of Charlotte Amalia of Nassau-Dillenburg (1718-1734)						Sons of William Henry. Charles was the only heir, but in 1741 he divided the inheritance, and gave Saarbrücken to his brother (raised as a principality), and retained Usingen.
Charles	31 December 1712; Usingen; First son of William Henry, Prince of Nassau-Usingen and Charlotte Amalia of Nassau-Dillenburg	14 February 1718 – 21 June 1775	Principality of Usingen	Christine Wilhelmine of Saxe-Eisenach; 26 December 1734 four children Magdalene Gross of Wiesbaden after 1740 (morganatic) four children	21 June 1775; Biebrich aged 62	Sons of William Henry. Charles was the only heir, but in 1741 he divided the inheritance, and gave Saarbrücken to his brother (raised as a principality), and retained Usingen.
William Henry	6 March 1718; Usingen; Second son of William Henry, Prince of Nassau-Usingen and Charlotte Amalia of Nassau-Dillenburg	1735 – 24 July 1768	Principality of Saarbrücken	Sophie Erdmuthe of Erbach-Erbach; 28 February 1742; Erbach five children	24 July 1768; Saarbrücken aged 50	Sons of William Henry. Charles was the only heir, but in 1741 he divided the inheritance, and gave Saarbrücken to his brother (raised as a principality), and retained Usingen.
Regencies of Anne of Great Britain (1751-1759, Marie Louise of Hesse-Kassel (1759-1765), Louis Ernest, Duke of Brunswick-Bevern (1759-1766) and Carolina of Orange-Nassau (1765-1766)						Also Hereditary Stadtholder of the Netherlands.
William V	8 March 1748; The Hague; Son of William IV and Anne of Great Britain	22 October 1751 – 9 April 1806	Principality of Dietz (with Barony of Breda;as Orange-Nassau)	Wilhelmina of Prussia I 4 October 1767; Berlin five children	9 April 1806; Braunschweig aged 58	Also Hereditary Stadtholder of the Netherlands.
Charles Christian	16 January 1735; Weilburg; Son of Charles August and Augusta Friederike of Nassau-Idstein	9 November 1753 – 28 November 1788	County of Weilburg	Carolina of Orange-Nassau; 5 March 1760; The Hague fifteen children Barbara Giessen; 2 October 1788 (morganatic) no children	28 November 1788; Münster-Dreissen aged 53	
Louis	3 January 1745; Saarbrücken; Son of William Henry and Sophie Erdmuthe of Erbach-Erbach	24 July 1768 – 2 March 1794	Principality of Saarbrücken	Wilhelmine of Schwarzburg-Rudolstadt; 30 October 1766; Schwarzburg one child Katharina Kest; 28 February 1787 (morganatic, legitimized 1787) seven children	2 March 1794; Aschaffenburg aged 49	
Charles William	9 November 1735; Usingen; First son of Charles and Christine Wilhelmine of Saxe-Eisenach	21 June 1775 – 17 May 1803	Principality of Usingen	Caroline Felizitas of Leiningen-Dagsburg; 16 April 1760 one child	17 May 1803; Biebrich aged 67	Left no descendants. He was succeeded by his brother.
In 1783, the heads of various branches of the House of Nassau sealed the Nassau Family Pact (Erbverein) to regulate future succession in their states, and to establish a dynastic hierarchy whereby the Prince of Orange-Nassau-Dietz was recognised as President of the House of Nassau.
Henry Louis	9 March 1768; Saarbrücken; Son of Louis and Wilhelmine of Schwarzburg-Rudolstadt	2 March 1794 – 27 April 1797	Principality of Saarbrücken	Marie Françoise Maximilienne of Saint Mauris-Montbarrey; 6 October 1785 no children	27 April 1797; Cadolzburg (aged 29)	After his death Nassau-Saarbrücken was occupied by France.
Nassau-Saarbrücken was annexed by France
Frederick Augustus	23 April 1738; Usingen; Second son of Charles and Christine Wilhelmine of Saxe-Eisenach	17 May 1803 – 24 March 1816	Principality of Usingen	Louise of Waldeck and Pyrmont; 9 June 1775 seven children	24 March 1816; Wiesbaden aged 77	From 1806 ruled jointly. Frederick William retained the title of Prince of Nassau, and Frederick Augustus maintained his title of Duke.
Frederick Augustus	23 April 1738; Usingen; Second son of Charles and Christine Wilhelmine of Saxe-Eisenach	30 August 1806 – 24 March 1816	Duchy of Nassau	Louise of Waldeck and Pyrmont; 9 June 1775 seven children	24 March 1816; Wiesbaden aged 77	From 1806 ruled jointly. Frederick William retained the title of Prince of Nassau, and Frederick Augustus maintained his title of Duke.
Nassau-Usingen united with Nassau-Weilburg to form the Duchy of Nassau						From 1806 ruled jointly. Frederick William retained the title of Prince of Nassau, and Frederick Augustus maintained his title of Duke.
Frederick William	25 October 1768; The Hague; Son of Charles Christian and Carolina of Orange-Nassau	28 November 1788 – 9 January 1816	County of Weilburg	Louise Isabelle of Kirchberg; 31 July 1788; Hachenburg four children	9 January 1816; Weilburg aged 47	From 1806 ruled jointly. Frederick William retained the title of Prince of Nassau, and Frederick Augustus maintained his title of Duke.
Frederick William	25 October 1768; The Hague; Son of Charles Christian and Carolina of Orange-Nassau	30 August 1806 – 9 January 1816	Duchy of Nassau	Louise Isabelle of Kirchberg; 31 July 1788; Hachenburg four children	9 January 1816; Weilburg aged 47	From 1806 ruled jointly. Frederick William retained the title of Prince of Nassau, and Frederick Augustus maintained his title of Duke.
Nassau-Weilburg united with Nassau-Usingen to form the Duchy of Nassau						From 1806 ruled jointly. Frederick William retained the title of Prince of Nassau, and Frederick Augustus maintained his title of Duke.
William VI	24 August 1772; The Hague; Son of William V and Wilhelmina of Prussia I	9 April – 12 July 1806 19 October 1813 – 31 May 1815	Principality of Dietz (with Barony of Breda;as Orange-Nassau)	Wilhelmina of Prussia II; 1 October 1791; Berlin six children Henrietta d'Oultremont; 17 February 1841 (morganatic) no children	12 December 1843; Berlin aged 71	Ascended 9 April 1806, and on 27 October his lands were annexed to the Duchy of Nassau. He revived the Principality of Orange-Nassau, but in 1815 was proclaimed King of the Netherlands. His Nassau lands returned to the Duchy of Nassau. See List of monarchs of the Netherlands for extended information on the descendants of William.
In 1806 (and then again in 1815), Dietz and Breda were annexed to the Duchy of Nassau
William	14 June 1792; Kirchheimbolanden; Son of Frederick William, Prince of Nassau-Weilburg and Louise Isabelle of Kirchberg	9 January 1816 – 24 March 1816 (as Prince of Weilburg) 24 March 1816 – 20 August 1839 (as Duke of Nassau)	Duchy of Nassau	Louise of Saxe-Hildburghausen; 24 June 1814; Weilburg eight children Pauline of Württemberg; 23 April 1829; Stuttgart four children	20/30 August 1839; Kissingen aged 47	
Adolph	24 July 1817; Wiesbaden; Son of William and Louise of Saxe-Hildburghausen	20 August 1839 – 20 September 1866	Duchy of Nassau	Elizabeth Mikhailovna of Russia; 31 January 1844; St. Petersburg no children Adelheid-Marie of Anhalt-Dessau; 23 April 1851; Dessau five children	17 November 1905; Lenggries aged 88	In 1866 lost his Nassau lands, but he was granted in 1890 the Grand Duchy of Luxembourg after the death of his 17th cousin without male descendants. See List of monarchs of Luxembourg for extended information on the descendants of Adolph.
In 1866, Nassau was annexed to the Kingdom of Prussia

== Nassau's successor states ==
=== Kings and Queens of the Netherlands (from the House of Orange-Nassau-Dietz) ===
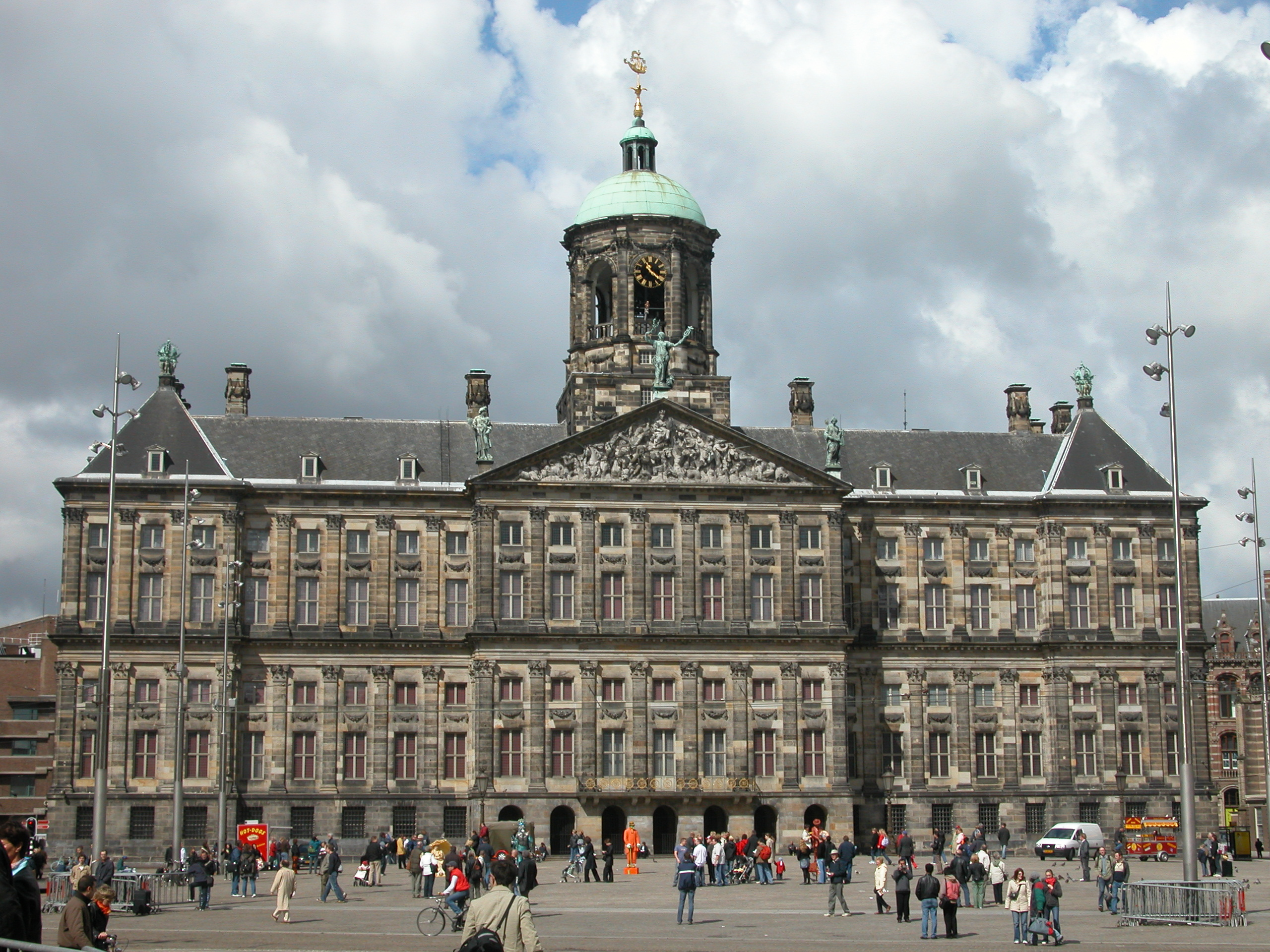
Royal Palace of Amsterdam

- 1815–1840: William I, also Duke and Grand Duke of Luxemburg and Duke of Limburg
- 1840–1849: William II, also Grand Duke of Luxemburg and Duke of Limburg
- 1849–1890: William III, also Grand Duke of Luxemburg and Duke of Limburg
- 1890–1948: Wilhelmina

Following defunct German laws that no longer have relevance due to the end of German nobility, the House of Orange-Nassau(-Dietz) has been extinct since the death of Wilhelmina (1962). Dutch laws and the Dutch nation do not consider it extinct.

- 1948–1980: Juliana
- 1980–2013: Beatrix
- 2013-present: Willem-Alexander

=== Grand Dukes of Luxembourg (from the House of Nassau-Weilburg) ===
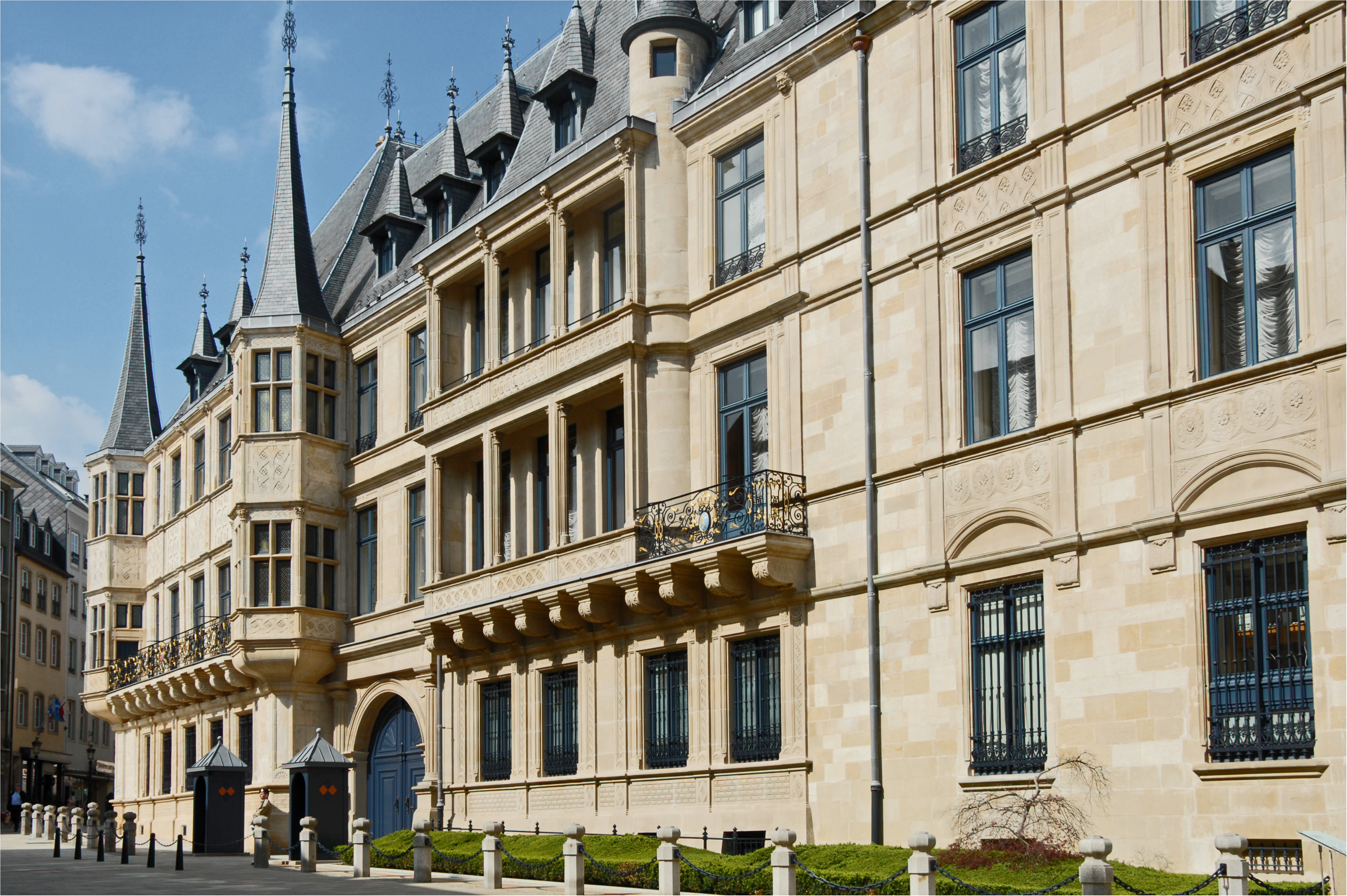
Grand Ducal Palace, Luxembourg

- 1890–1905: Adolphe
- 1905–1912: William IV
- 1912–1919: Marie-Adélaïde, succession through a female onwards
- 1919–1964: Charlotte
- 1964–2000: Jean
- 2000–2025: Henri
- 2025–present: Guillaume V

== See also ==
- House of Nassau
- County of Nassau-Saarbrücken
- Duchy of Nassau
