= 1596 =

1596 in various calendars
- Gregorian calendar: 1596; MDXCVI
- Ab urbe condita: 2349
- Armenian calendar: 1045; ԹՎ ՌԽԵ
- Assyrian calendar: 6346
- Balinese saka calendar: 1517–1518
- Bengali calendar: 1002–1003
- Berber calendar: 2546
- English Regnal year: 38 Eliz. 1 – 39 Eliz. 1
- Buddhist calendar: 2140
- Burmese calendar: 958
- Byzantine calendar: 7104–7105
- Chinese calendar: 乙未年 (Wood Goat); 4293 or 4086 — to — 丙申年 (Fire Monkey); 4294 or 4087
- Coptic calendar: 1312–1313
- Discordian calendar: 2762
- Ethiopian calendar: 1588–1589
- Hebrew calendar: 5356–5357
- Hindu calendars
- Vikram Samvat: 1652–1653
- Shaka Samvat: 1517–1518
- Kali Yuga: 4696–4697
- Holocene calendar: 11596
- Igbo calendar: 596–597
- Iranian calendar: 974–975
- Islamic calendar: 1004–1005
- Japanese calendar: Bunroku 5 / Keichō 1 (慶長元年)
- Javanese calendar: 1516–1517
- Julian calendar: Gregorian minus 10 days
- Korean calendar: 3929
- Minguo calendar: 316 before ROC 民前316年
- Nanakshahi calendar: 128
- Thai solar calendar: 2138–2139
- Tibetan calendar: ཤིང་མོ་ལུག་ལོ་ (female Wood-Sheep); 1722 or 1341 or 569 — to — མེ་ཕོ་སྤྲེ་ལོ་ (male Fire-Monkey); 1723 or 1342 or 570

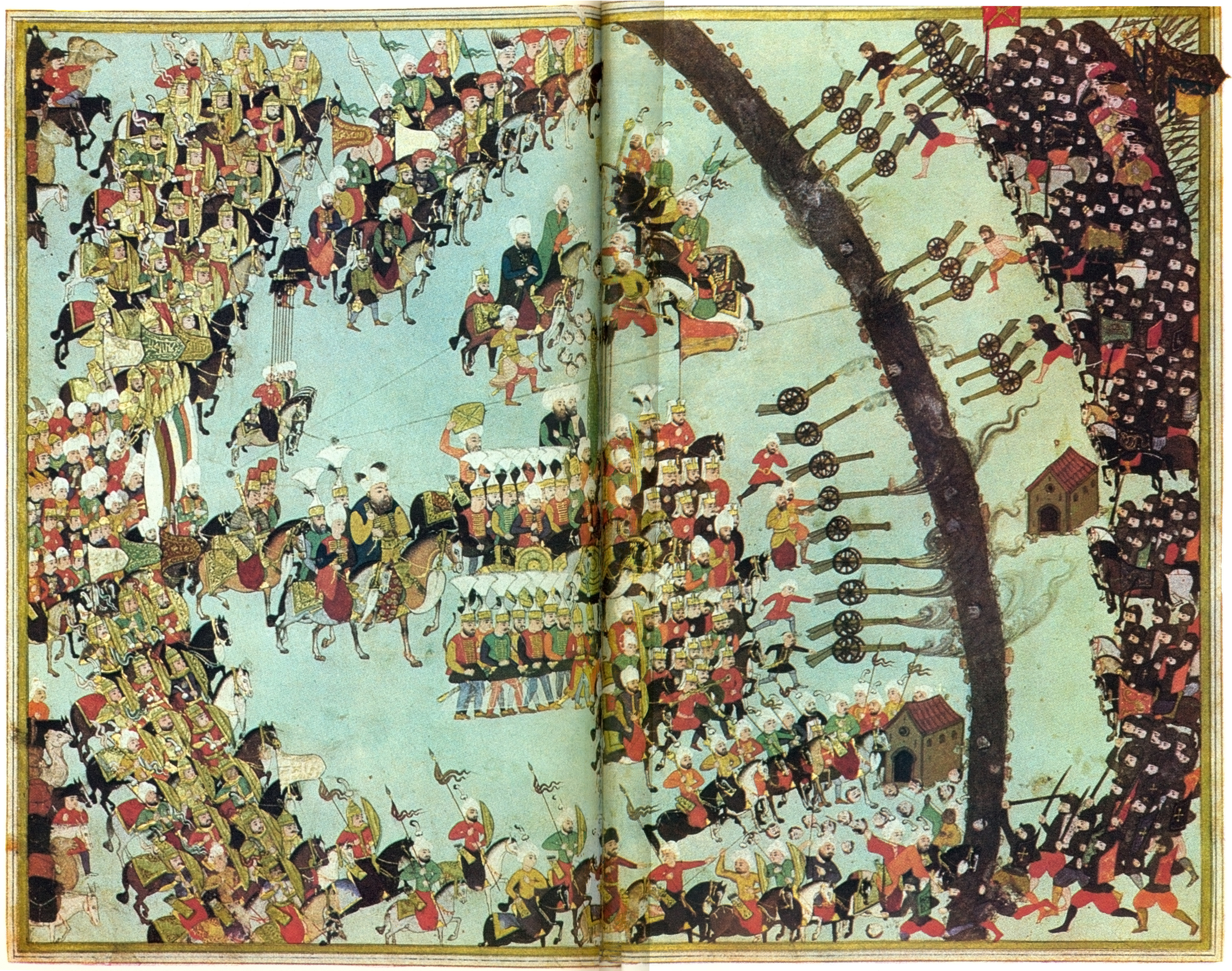
October 24–26: Battle of Keresztes

1596 (MDXCVI) was a leap year starting on Monday of the Gregorian calendar and a leap year starting on Thursday of the Julian calendar, the 1596th year of the Common Era (CE) and Anno Domini (AD) designations, the 596th year of the 2nd millennium, the 96th year of the 16th century, and the 7th year of the 1590s decade. As of the start of 1596, the Gregorian calendar was 10 days ahead of the Julian calendar, which remained in localized use until 1923.

== Events ==
=== January–March ===
- January 6 – Drake's Assault on Panama: Sir Francis Drake, General Thomas Baskerville and an English force of 15 ships land at the Atlantic Ocean port of Nombre de Dios in an attempt to capture the Isthmus of Panama.
- January 20 – Francis Drake, unable to receive a ransom for the town of Nombre de Dios, orders the town and all Spanish ships in harbor to be burned. At the same time, General Baskerville leads 750 men on a mission to clear the Isthmus of Spanish parties.
- January 27 – With an epidemic of dysentery spreading through the English forces of Drake and Baskerville, Drake orders survivors to retreat to the English ships, anchored off of the island of Escudo de Veraguas. Drake dies of dystentery two days later on his flagship, Defiance.
- February 11 – Albert of Austria arrives in Brussels to begin his administration as Governor General of the Habsburg Netherlands.
- February 14 – Archbishop John Whitgift begins building his hospital at Croydon.
- March 11 – The Battle of Pinos is fought between the English Navy (with 14 warships) and the Spanish Navy (with 13 galleons) off of the coast Cuba's Isla de Pinos, with 325 English Navy men killed or captured, while Spain drives Baskerville's ships to retreat and sustains 80 dead or wounded.
- March 15 – During Spain's Brittany Campaign during the Anglo-Spanish War, a Spanish ship carrying 25 soldiers invades England after arriving at Cawsand Bay in Cornwall. After starting a fire, the Spanish retreat.

=== April–June ===
- April 9 – Siege of Calais: Army of Flanders captures Calais.
- May 18 – Willem Barents leaves Vlie, on his third and final Arctic voyage.
- June 5 – Pope Clement VIII appoints 16 new Cardinals.
- June 10 – Willem Barents and Jacob van Heemskerk discover Bear Island.
- June 17 – Willem Barents discovers Spitsbergen.
- June 24 – Cornelis de Houtman arrives in Banten, the first Dutch sailor to reach Indonesia.

=== July–September ===
- July 5 – Capture of Cádiz: An English fleet, commanded by Robert Devereux, 2nd Earl of Essex, and Lord Howard of Effingham, sacks Cádiz.
- July 14 – King Dominicus Corea (Edirille Bandara) is beheaded by the Portuguese in Colombo, Ceylon.
- July 18 – Queen Elizabeth I of England issues "an open warrant to the Lord Mayor of London and the aldermen and his brethren, and to all other vice-admirals, mayors, and other public officers whatsoever to whom it may appertain" directing that Africans in the realm will be deported. Citing a request from Casper van Senden "to have licence to take up so many blackamoors here in this realm and to transport them into Spain and Portugal," the Queen notes that "Her majesty... considering the reasonableness of his request to transport so many blackamoors from hence, doth think it a very good exchange and that those kind of people may be well spared in this realm being so populous and numbers of able persons the subjects of the land and Christian people that perish for want of service, whereby through their labor they might be maintained."
- August 18 – The siege of the Dutch city of Hulst is completed after a month as Spanish forces under the command of Albert, son of the late Holy Roman Emperor Maxmimilan II, force the surrender of the city.
- August 29 – The coronation of Christian IV as King of Denmark and King of Norway takes place at the Vor Frue Kirke cathedral in Copenhagen. The Bishop of Zealand, Peder Virstrup, places the crown upon the head of King Christian IV, who had become the monarch in 1588 at the age of 11.
- August – David Fabricius discovers the variable nature of the star Mira.
- September 20 – Diego de Montemayor founds the city of Monterrey, Mexico.

=== October–December ===
- October 10 – The Union of Brest: The Ukrainian Church west of the Dnieper becomes known as the Ukrainian Rite of Catholicism, whereas the East officially renounces the authority of the Pope.
- October 18 – The Second Armada, a Spanish fleet sent to attack England in revenge for the raid on Cadiz, is wrecked in storms off Cape Finisterre; nearly 5,000 men and 44 ships are lost including five galleons
- October 19 – The Spanish galleon San Felipe founders in Japan, leading to 26 Christians being martyred the next year.
- October 26 – Battle of Keresztes: The Ottoman Empire Turks defeat a combined Habsburg–Transylvanian army, after two days of fighting: .
- November 25 – The Cudgel War begins in Finland (at the time part of Sweden), when poor peasants rise up against the troops, nobles and cavalry who have taxed them.
- December 5 – Damat Ibrahim Pasha is appointed the Grand Vizier of the Ottoman Empire by Sultan Mehmed III for the second time in less than a year, replacing Cigalazade Yusuf Sinan Pasha, who succeeded him on October 27.
- December 8 – In Japan, Toyotomi Hideyoshi, Chancellor of the Realm, orders the arrest of the 26 Roman Catholic Christians who had the misfortune of being shipwrecked in Kyoto on October 19; each of the ones arrested has a part of the left ear cut off, then sent on a forced march to Nagasaki on January 4, then has them killed on February 5.
- December 31 – King Henry IV of France (who was originally King Henry III of the Kingdom of Navarre) declares Navarre to be permanently separate of France.

=== Date unknown ===
- The first water closet, by Sir John Harington, is installed in a manor near Kelston in England.
- King Sigismund III Vasa moves the capital of Poland from Kraków to Warsaw.
- Sidney Sussex College, Cambridge, is founded.
- The Black Death hits parts of Europe.
- The fourth of a five year run of poor harvests, largely caused by the weather, a pattern typical of the last third of the century. This causes famine throughout Europe, which leads to food riots in Britain.
- The Serb Uprising of 1596–97 begins.

== Births ==
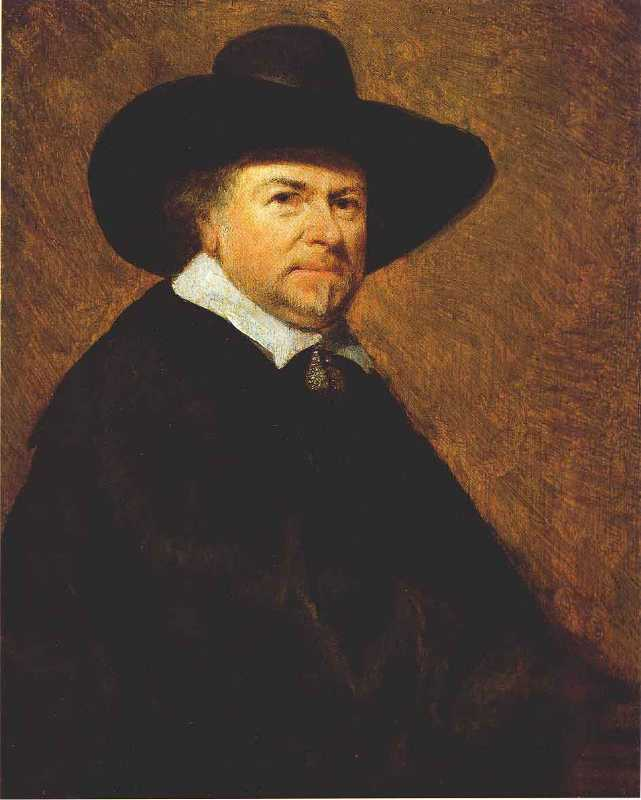
Jan van Goyen

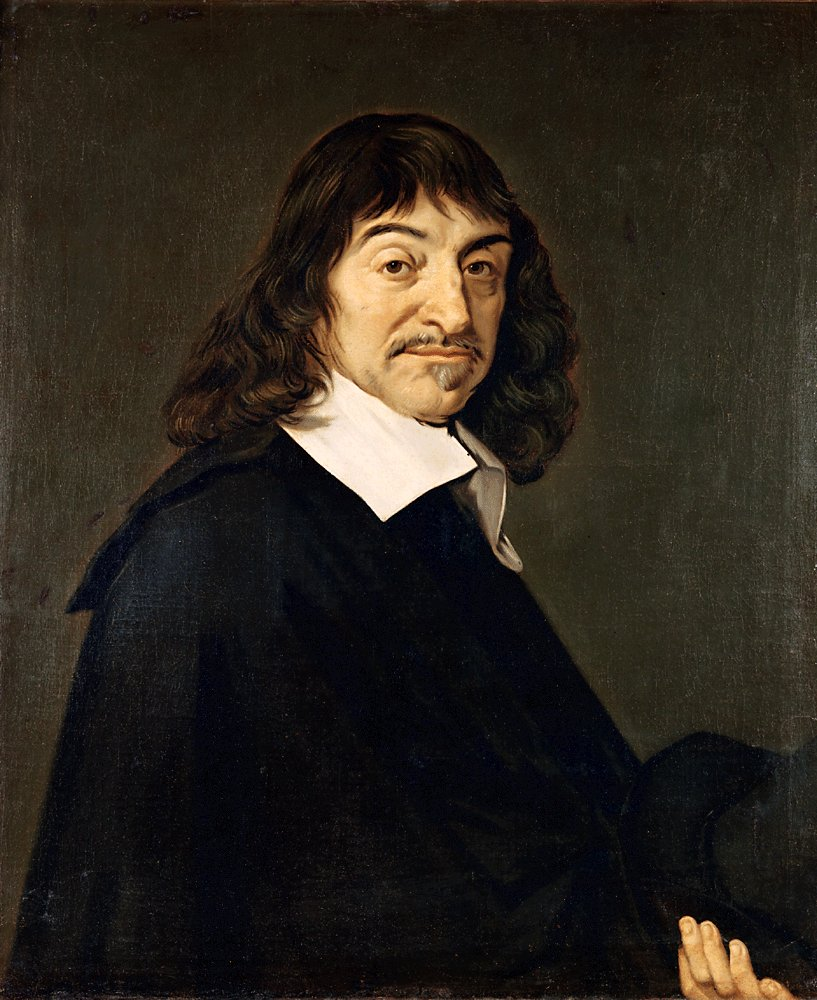
René Descartes

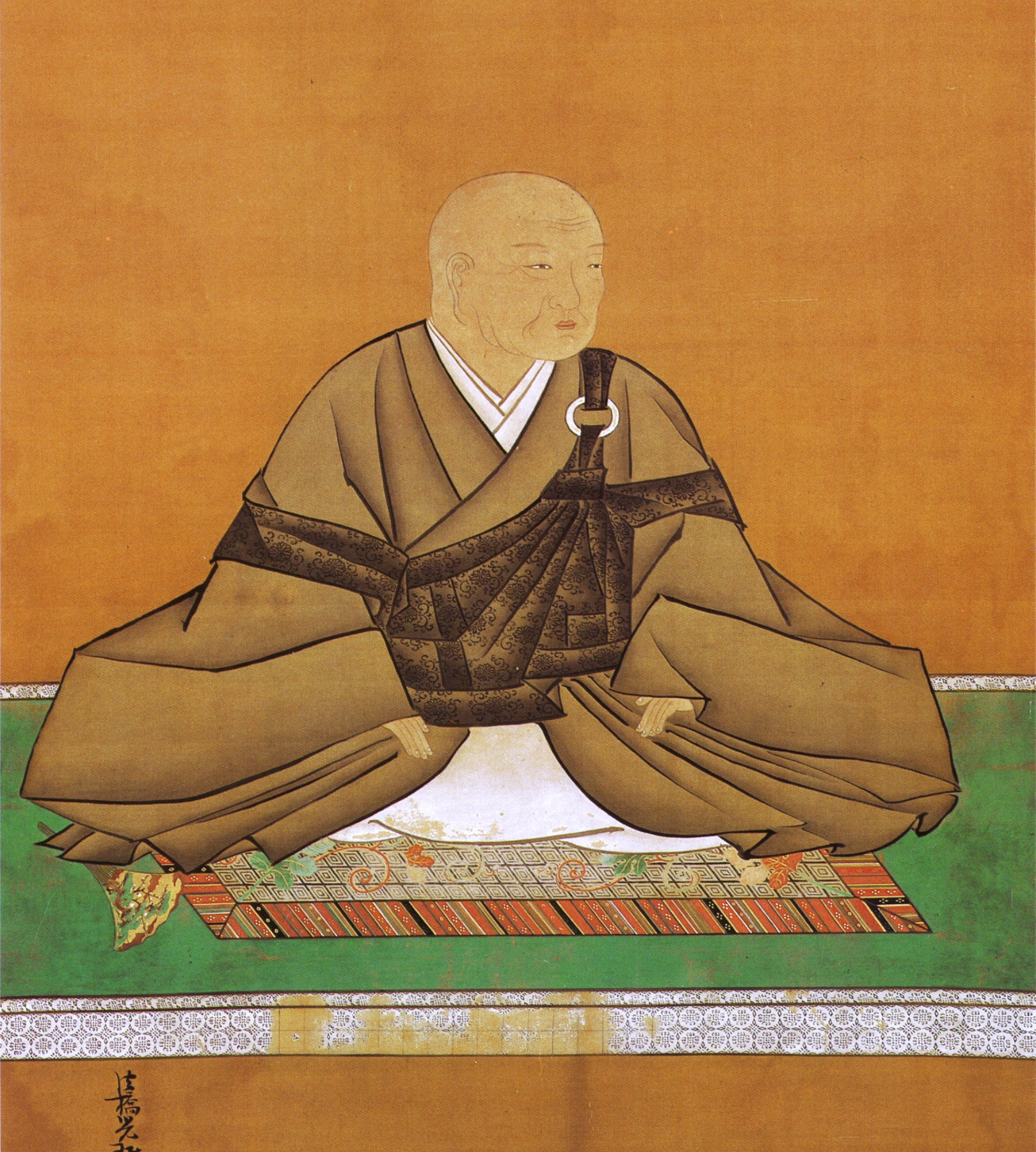
Emperor Go-Mizunoo

=== January–June ===
- January 1 – Elizabeth Ribbing, Swedish noble (d. 1662)
- January 13 – Jan van Goyen, Dutch painter (d. 1656)
- February 2
  - Jacob van Campen, Dutch artist and architect of the Golden Age (d. 1657)
  - Carew Mildmay, Member of the Parliament of England (d. 1676)
- February 3 – Brás Garcia de Mascarenhas, soldier, poet and writer (d. 1656)
- February 8 – Louis Giry, French lawyer, classical scholar (d. 1665)
- February 27 – Johan Stiernhöök, Swedish lawyer (d. 1675)
- March 1 – Duke Frederick of Saxe-Weimar, German prince and colonel (d. 1622)
- March 10 – Princess Maria Elizabeth of Sweden (d. 1618)
- March 11 – Isaac Elzevir, Dutch printer and publisher (d. 1651)
- March 16 – Ebba Brahe, Swedish countess (d. 1674)
- March 24 – Elizabeth of Hesse-Kassel, Duchess of Mecklenburg-Gütsrow (d. 1625)
- March 26 – Catherine Henriette de Bourbon, French noble (d. 1663)
- March 31 – René Descartes, French philosopher and mathematician (d. 1650)
- April 8 – Juan van der Hamen, Spanish artist (d. 1631)
- April 11 – Moritz Gudenus, German Catholic preacher (d. 1680)
- May 9 – Abraham van Diepenbeeck, Dutch painter (d. 1675)
- May 21 – John Louis II, Count of Nassau-Wiesbaden-Idstein (d. 1605)
- June 5 – Peter Wtewael, Dutch painter (d. 1660)
- June 6 – Michel Particelli d'Émery, French politician (d. 1650)
- June 23 – Johan Banér, Swedish field marshal in the Thirty Years' War (d. 1641)
- June 27 – Maximilian, Prince of Dietrichstein, German prince (d. 1655)
- June 29 – Emperor Go-Mizunoo of Japan (d. 1680)

=== July–December ===
- July 1 – Bertuccio Valiero, Doge of Venice (d. 1658)
- July 12 – Michael I of Russia, Russian Tsar (d. 1645)
- August 10 – Lorentz Eichstadt, German mathematician and astronomer (d. 1660)
- August 26 – Frederick V of the Palatinate (d. 1632)
- August 18 – Jean Bolland, Belgian Jesuit, Founder of the Bollandist (d. 1665)
- August 19 – Elizabeth Stuart, later Queen of Bohemia (d. 1662)
- September
  - James Shirley, English dramatist (d. 1666)
  - Moses Amyraut, French Protestant theologian (d. 1664)
- September 3 – Nicola Amati, Italian luthier from Cremona (d. 1684)
- September 4 – Constantijn Huygens, Dutch Golden Age poet and composer (d. 1687)
- September 7 – John Casimir, Prince of Anhalt-Dessau (d. 1660)
- September 11 – Francis Eaton, Mayflower passenger and New World colonist (d. 1633)
- September 23 – Joan Blaeu, Dutch cartographer (d. 1673)
- October 1 – Cesare Dandini, Italian painter (d. 1657)
- October 5 – Pieter van Mierevelt, Dutch painter (d. 1623)
- October 18 – Edward Winslow, American Pilgrim leader (d. 1655)
- October 23 – Daniel Hay du Chastelet de Chambon, French mathematician (d. 1671)
- October 26 – Robert Coe, American colonial (d. 1689)
- November 1
  - Albert, Count of Nassau-Dillenburg, joint ruler of Nassau-Dillenburg 1623–1626 (d. 1626)
  - Pietro da Cortona, Italian painter (d. 1669)
- November 5 – Charles II, Duke of Elbeuf, French noble (d. 1657)
- November 6 – Jeanne Chezard de Matel, French mystic (d. 1670)
- November 21 – René de Voyer de Paulmy d'Argenson, French politician (d. 1651)
- December 12 – Sir Edward Osborne, 1st Baronet, English politician (d. 1647)
- December 13 – António Luís de Meneses, 1st Marquis of Marialva, Portuguese general and noble (d. 1675)
- December 21
  - Thomas Francis, Prince of Carignano (d. 1656)
  - Peter Mohyla, Moldavian Orthodox Metropolitan of Kiev and Galicia (d. 1646)
- December 24 – Leonaert Bramer, Dutch painter (d. 1674)

=== Date unknown ===
- Francesco Buonamici, Italian architect, painter and engraver (d. 1677)
- John Dury, Scottish-born Calvinist minister (d. 1680)
- Franz von Hatzfeld, Prince-Bishop of Würzburg (d. 1642)
- Lucas Holstenius, German humanist (d. 1661)
- Georg Jenatsch, Swiss political leader (d. 1639)
- Richard Mather, American clergyman (d. 1669)
- Horio Tadaharu, Japanese warlord (d. 1633)
- Pocahontas, Algonquian (Native American) princess (d. 1617)

== Deaths ==
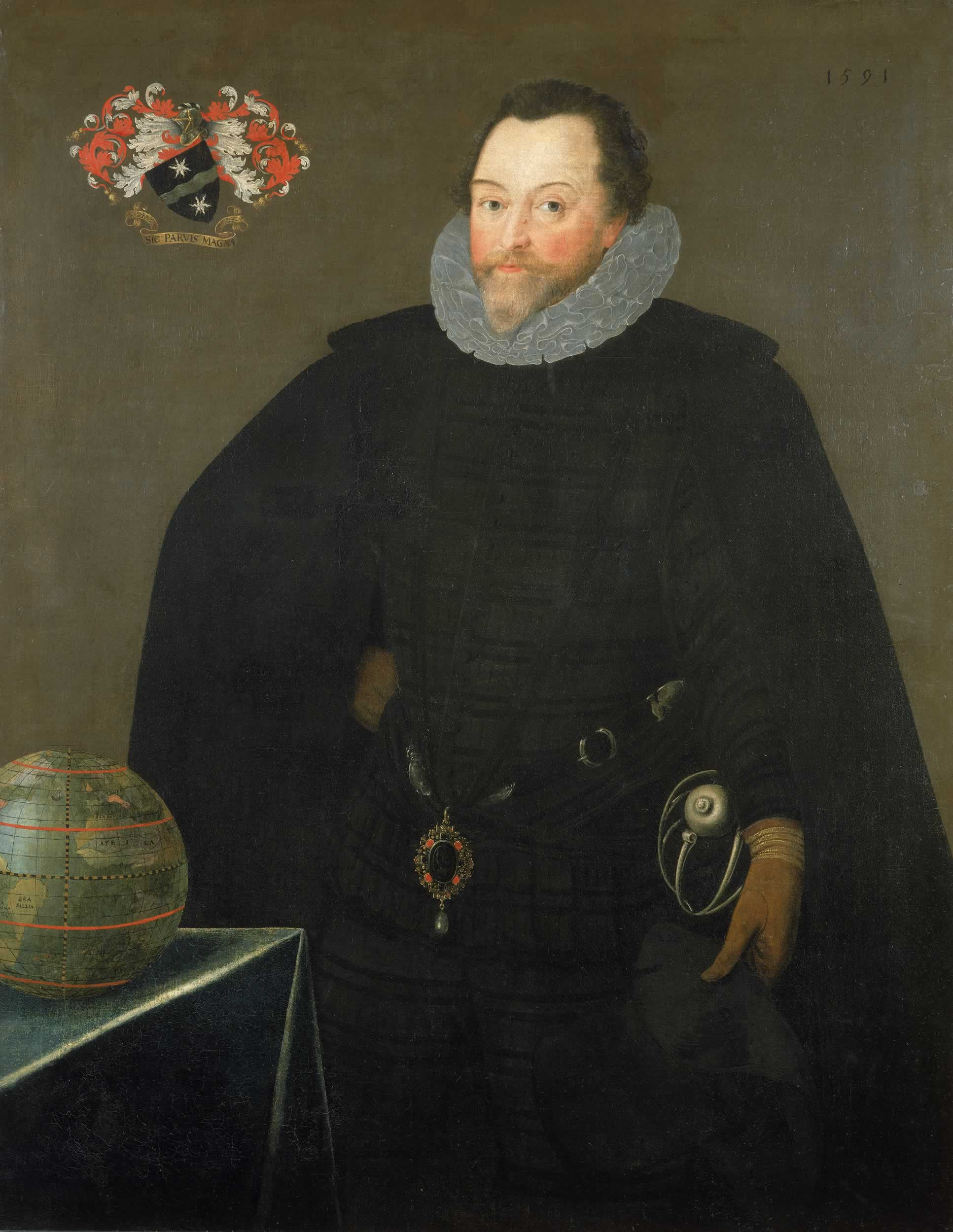
Sir Francis Drake

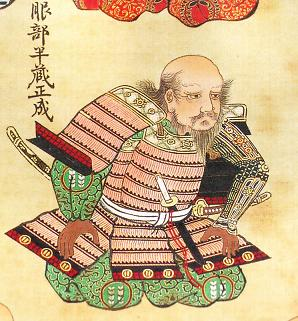
Hattori Hanzō

- January 28 – Sir Francis Drake, English explorer, sea captain, privateer, navigator, slaver, pirate and politician (b. c. 1540)
- February 7 – George I, Landgrave of Hesse-Darmstadt (b. 1547)
- February 17 – Friedrich Sylburg, German classical scholar (b. 1536)
- February 19 – Blaise de Vigenère, French cryptographer, diplomat, scientist, and author (b. 1523)
- March 23 – Henry Unton, English diplomat (b. 1557)
- March 27 – Frederick IV of Liegnitz, German noble (b. 1552)
- April 4 – Philip II, Duke of Brunswick-Grubenhagen (b. 1533)
- April 6 – Jørgen Ottesen Rosenkrantz, Danish nobleman and statesman (d. 1596)
- May – Janet Fockart, Scottish merchant and moneylender
- May 5 – Catherine de Montpensier, politically active French duchess (b. 1552)
- May 6 – Giaches de Wert, Flemish composer (b. 1535)
- May 31 – John Lesley, Scottish bishop (b. 1527)
- June 10 – John Louis I, Count of Nassau-Wiesbaden-Idstein, Germany noble (b. 1567)
- June 29 – Emperor Go-Mizunoo, 108th Emperor of Japan (d. 1680)
- July 10 – Alessandro Alberti, Italian painter (b. 1551)
- July 23 – Henry Carey, 1st Baron Hunsdon (b. 1526)
- August 11 – Hamnet Shakespeare, son of William Shakespeare (b. 1585)
- September 9 – Anna Jagiellon, queen of Poland (b. 1523)
- September 14 – Francisco de Toledo, Spanish Catholic cardinal (b. 1532)
- September 15 – Leonhard Rauwolf, German physician and botanist (b. 1535)
- October 3 – Florent Chrestien, French writer (b. 1541)
- October 26 – István Esterházy, Hungarian noble (b. 1572)
- November 1 – Pierre Pithou, French lawyer and scholar (b. 1539)
- November 10 – Peter Wentworth, English Puritan politician (b. 1530)
- November 29
  - William Gibson (martyr), English Catholic martyr
  - Venerable William Knight, English Catholic martyr (b. 1572)
- December 8 – Francisca Nuñez de Carabajal, Portuguese-born marrano, burned at the stake
- December 27 – Pietro Pontio, Italian music theorist and composer (b. 1532)
- date unknown
  - Jean Bodin, French jurist (born 1530)
  - Anna Wecker, German writer
  - Hattori Hanzō, Japanese ninja under Tokugawa Ieyasu (b. 1541)
- probable – Henry Willobie, English poet (b. 1575)
