= Philip I of Nassau-Wiesbaden-Idstein =

Philip I, Count of Nassau-Wiesbaden-Idstein
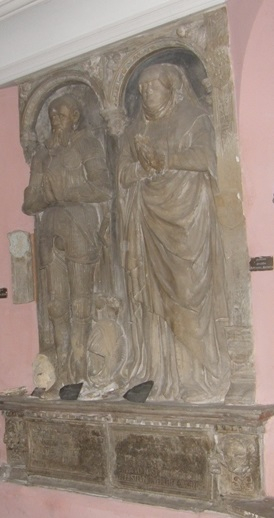
- Born: 1490; Cologne
- Died: 16 June 1558
- Noble family: House of Nassau
- Spouse: Adriana of Glymes of Bergen
- Father: Adolf III of Nassau-Wiesbaden-Idstein
- Mother: Margaret of Hanau-Lichtenberg

Philip I, Count of Nassau-Wiesbaden-Idstein (1490 in Cologne – 16 June 1558) was member of the House of Nassau who ruled the County of Nassau-Wiesbaden-Idstein.

== Early life ==
He was born as the only son of Count Adolph III and his wife, Countess Margaret of Hanau-Lichtenberg. After his father died in 1511, he became the ruler in his own right.

== Marriage and issue ==
In 1514, he married Adriana of Glymes, the daughter of John III of Bergen op Zoom. They had five children:

- Catherine (1515–1540), married in 1538 to John II of Hohenfels
- Philip II (1516–1566)
- Margaret (1517–1596)
- Adolph (1518–1556), married in 1543 to Countess Françoise of Luxembourg, the daughter of Charles I, Count of Ligny
- Balthasar (1520–1568)

Philip I of Nassau-Wiesbaden-Idstein House of Nassau Born: 1490 Died: 16 June 1558
| Preceded by Adolph III | Count of Nassau-Wiesbaden-Idstein; 1511-1558 | Succeeded by Philip II |
