= Maria of Nassau-Dillenburg =

- Born: 1568
- Died: 1625 (aged 56–57)
- Noble family: House of Nassau
- Father: John VI, Count of Nassau-Dillenburg
- Mother: Countess Elisabeth of Leuchtenberg

Maria of Nassau-Dillenburg (1568–1625) was a daughter of Count John VI "the Elder" of Nassau-Dillenburg and his first wife, Countess Elisabeth of Leuchtenberg.

Maria married her cousin John Louis I, Count of Nassau-Wiesbaden-Idstein in 1588 and was the mother of:

- Margaretha (1589–1660), married in 1606 to Adolph of Bentheim
- Anna Catharina (1590–1622), married in 1607 to Count Simon VII "the Pious" of Lippe
- Marie Magdalene (1592–1654), married in 1609 Wolfgang Heinrich, Count of Isenburg-Offenbach
- Juliana (1593–1605)
- John Philip (1595–1599)
- John Louis II (1596–1605).
