= Philip II of Nassau-Wiesbaden =

Philip II, Count of Nassau-Wiesbaden
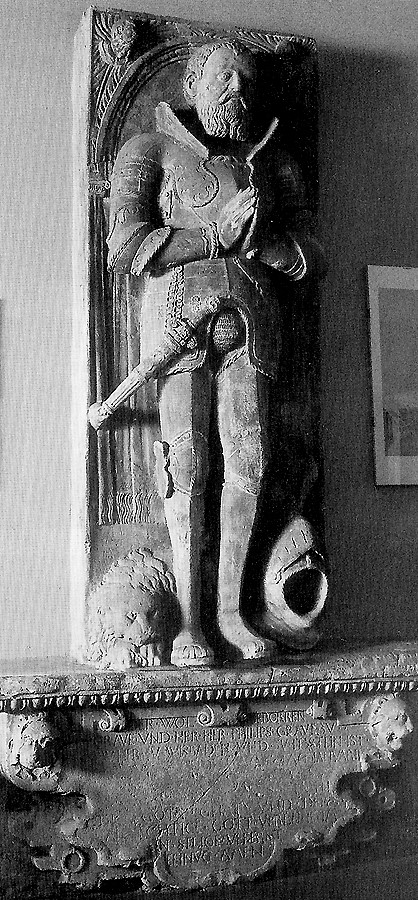
- Born: 1516
- Died: 3 January 1566; Wiesbaden-Sonnenberg
- Noble family: House of Nassau
- Father: Philip I, Count of Nassau-Wiesbaden-Idstein
- Mother: Adriana of Glymes of Bergen

Philip II, Count of Nassau-Wiesbaden (1516 – 3 January 1566 in Wiesbaden-Sonnenberg) was the eldest son of Philip I and his wife, Adriana of Glymes of Bergen. He succeeded his father as Count of Nassau-Wiesbaden and Nassau-Idstein in 1558.

He died unmarried and childless in 1566, and was succeeded as Count of Nassau-Wiesbaden-Idstein by his younger brother Balthasar.

Philip II of Nassau-Wiesbaden House of Nassau Born: 1516 Died: 3 January 1566
| Preceded by Philip I | Count of Nassau-Wiesbaden-Idstein; 1558-1566 | Succeeded by Balthasar |
