= Balthasar, Count of Nassau-Wiesbaden-Idstein =

- Born: 1520
- Died: 11 January 1568
- Noble family: House of Nassau
- Spouse: Margaret of Isenburg-Birstein
- Father: Philip I, Count of Nassau-Wiesbaden-Idstein
- Mother: Adriana of Glymes of Bergen

Balthasar of Nassau-Wiesbaden-Idstein (1520 – 11 January 1568) was the youngest son of Count Philip I of Nassau-Wiesbaden-Idstein and his wife, Adriana of Glymes of Bergen, the daughter of John III of Bergen op Zoom.

In 1566, Balthasar succeeded his elder brother Philip II as Count of Nassau-Wiesbaden and Nassau-Idstein. However, he died only two years later. He was succeeded by his son John Louis I.

In 1564, Balthasar married Margaret (1543–1612), the daughter of Reinhard of Isenburg-Birstein. They had a son:

- John Louis I (1567–1596)

After Balthasar's death, Margaret married Count George I of Leiningen-Westerburg.

Balthasar, Count of Nassau-Wiesbaden-Idstein House of Nassau Born: 1520 Died: 11 January 1568
Preceded by Philip II	Count of Nassau-Wiesbaden-Idstein; 1566-1568	Succeeded by John Louis I
