= Louis Giry =

French lawyer and scholar (1596–1665)

Louis Giry (8 February 1596 – 28 July 1665) was a French lawyer, translator and writer.

== Biography ==
Born in Paris in 1595, Louis Giry was a French lawyer and was one of the first members of the Académie française. He served as the general counsel for the depreciation chamber and the freeholds in the Paris Parliament. He also became part of the Privy Council of Mazarin.

Giry died in 1665 at age 70. He was the father of Francois Giry, noted for his commentary of the Rule of Saint Francois de Paule.

== Works ==
Giry's published works include Les verifons fuivantes, la Pierre de touche which was a translation of Trajano Boccalini's original. He translated Tertullian's Apology and several other works such as Plato's Crito and Apology and Saint Augustine's La Cite de Dieu.
