= John Louis II of Nassau-Wiesbaden-Idstein =

John Louis II, Count of Nassau-Wiesbaden-Idstein
- Born: 21 May 1596
- Died: 9 June 1605 (aged 9); Dillenburg
- Noble family: House of Nassau
- Father: John Louis I, Count of Nassau-Wiesbaden-Idstein
- Mother: Maria of Nassau-Dillenburg

Count John Louis II (German: Johann Ludwig II) of Nassau-Wiesbaden-Idstein (born: 21 May 1596; died: 9 June 1605 at Dillenburg) was the youngest and only surviving son of John Louis I and Maria of Nassau-Dillenburg.

He was only a few weeks old when his father died and he inherited Nassau-Wiesbaden and Nassau-Idstein. However, he died when he was ten years old. With his death, the Nassau-Wiesbaden-Idstein line died out.

Wiesbaden and Idstein fell back to Nassau-Weilburg, thereby reuniting all the territories of the Nassau-Walram ΙΙ line in one hand.

John Louis II of Nassau-Wiesbaden-Idstein House of Nassau Born: 21 May 1596 Died: 9 June 1605
Preceded by John Louis I	Count of Nassau-Wiesbaden-Idstein; 1596-1605	Succeeded by Louis II
