= John Louis I of Nassau-Wiesbaden-Idstein =

John Louis I, Count of Nassau-Wiesbaden-Idstein
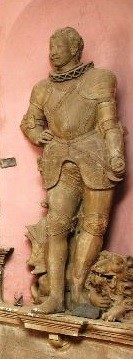
- Born: 10 April 1567
- Died: 10 June 1596 (aged 29)
- Noble family: House of Nassau
- Spouse: Maria of Nassau-Dillenburg
- Father: Balthasar, Count of Nassau-Wiesbaden-Idstein
- Mother: Margaret of Isenburg-Bierstein

John Louis I, Count of Nassau-Wiesbaden-Idstein (10 April 1567 – 10 June 1596) was the son of Count Balthasar of Nassau-Wiesbaden-Idstein and his wife Margaret of Isenburg-Birstein. He succeeded his father in 1568 as Count of Nassau-Wiesbaden.

== Marriage and issue ==
In 1588, John Louis married Maria of Nassau-Dillenburg, daughter of John VI, Count of Nassau-Dillenburg. They had the following children:

- Margaret (1589–1660), married in 1606 with Adolph of Bentheim, son of Arnold III, Count of Bentheim-Steinfurt-Tecklenburg-Limburg
- Anna Catherine (1590–1622), married in 1607 with Simon VII, Count of Lippe
- Marie Magdalene (1592–1654), married in 1609 Wolfgang Heinrich, Count of Isenburg-Offenbach
- Juliana (1593–1605)
- John Philip (1595–1599), his successor with his brother John Louis II until his death
- John Louis II (1596–1605), his successor, the last male of Nassau-Wiesbaden-Idstein line

== Death ==
John Louis l fell out of the window of his residence, Idstein Castle, and drowned in the moat during the baptism for one of his children.

== Footnotes ==
John Louis I of Nassau-Wiesbaden-Idstein House of Nassau Born: 10 April 1567 10 June
Preceded by Balthasar	Count of Nassau-Wiesbaden-Idstein; 1568-1596	Succeeded by John Louis II
