= Christian, Prince of Nassau-Dillenburg =

- Born: 12 August 1688; Dillenburg Castle
- Died: 28 August 1739 (aged 51); Straßebersbach, now part of Dietzhölztal
- Spouse: Isabella Charlotte of Nassau-Dietz
- House: House of Nassau-Dillenburg
- Father: Henry, Prince of Nassau-Dillenburg
- Mother: Dorothea Elizabeth of Legnica

Christian, Prince of Nassau-Dillenburg (12 August 1688 at Dillenburg Castle – 28 August 1739 in Straßebersbach, now part of Dietzhölztal) was the last ruler (i.e. Fürst) of Nassau-Dillenburg from the line that had started in 1606 with George, Count of Nassau-Dillenburg.

== Life ==
His parents were Henry, Prince of Nassau-Dillenburg (1641-1701) and his wife Duchess Dorothea Elizabeth of Legnica.

After his parents died, his older brother William II took up Christian's education. Christian and his Hofmeister, Gustav von Moltke, were sent to Leiden, where Christian enthusiastically studied mathematics at the local university.

In 1708, Christian joined the Dutch army as a major. On 16 April 1711, he was promoted to colonel. He fought with distinction in the Dutch against the French during the War of the Spanish Succession. After the 1713 Treaty of Utrecht, he returned to Germany and resided in Hadamar. In 1711, Francis Alexander, the last Prince of Nassau-Hadamar had died and his territory had been divided among the surviving Ottonian lines of Nassau: Nassau-Dietz, Nassau-Dillenburg and Nassau-Siegen.

In 1724, his brother William II died without a male heir and Christian inherited Nassau-Dillenburg.

In 1731, Prince Frederick William II of Nassau-Siegen died. With his death, the Calvinist line of Nassau-Siegen died out. Initially, the rule of Nassau-Siegen was taken of by Emmanuel Ignaz (1688-1735), a younger half-brother of William Hyacinth, who had been deposed in 1707. After Emmanuel Ignaz died in 1735, Nassau-Siegen was divided by the remaining Ottonian lines: Nassau-Dietz and Nassau-Dillenburg. As head of the Ottonian branch, Christian concluded an inheritance treaty in 1736 with Charles August, the head of the Walram line: if one of the line were to die out in the male line, the other line would inherit their possessions.

Prince Christian died of a catarrhus suffocativus attack on 28 August 1739 in Straßebersbach (now part of Dietzhölztal). Since he was childless, Nassau-Dillenburg was divided between William IV of Nassau-Dietz and William Hyacinth of Nassau-Siegen. The latter was in financial difficulties and sold his share on 17 February 1742 to William IV for 40000taler.

Prince Christian was appointed Knight of the Order of Saint Hubert.

== Marriage ==
In 1725, Christian married Isabella Charlotte, the daughter of Henry Casimir II of Nassau-Dietz.

== Ancestors ==
Ancestors of Christian, Prince of Nassau-Dillenburg

16. George, Count of Nassau-Dillenburg
8. Louis Henry, Prince of Nassau-Dillenburg
17. Anna Amalia of Nassau-Saarbrücken
4. George Louis, Prince of Nassau-Dillenburg
18. Louis I, Count of Sayn-Wittgenstein
9. Catherine of Sayn-Wittgenstein
19. Elisabeth of Solms-Laubach
2. Henry, Prince of Nassau-Dillenburg
20. Julius, Duke of Brunswick-Lüneburg
10. Henry Julius, Duke of Brunswick-Wolfenbüttel
21. Hedwig of Brandenburg
5. Anna Augusta of Brunswick-Wolfenbüttel
22. Frederick II of Denmark
11. Elisabeth of Denmark
23. Sophie of Mecklenburg-Güstrow
1. Christian, Prince of Nassau-Dillenburg
24. Joachim Frederick of Brieg
12. John Christian of Brieg
25. Anna Maria of Anhalt
6. George III of Brieg
26. John George, Elector of Brandenburg
13. Dorothea Sybille of Brandenburg
27. Elisabeth of Anhalt-Zerbst
3. Dorothea Elizabeth of Legnica
28. Henry II, Duke of Münsterberg-Oels
14. Charles II, Duke of Münsterberg-Oels
29. Margaret of Mecklenburg-Schwerin
7. Sophie Catherine of Münsterberg-Oels
30. George II of Brieg
15. Elisabeth Magdalena of Brieg
31. Barbara of Brandenburg

Christian, Prince of Nassau-Dillenburg House of Nassau Born: 12 August 1688 Died: 28 August 1739
Preceded by William II	Prince of Nassau-Dillenburg; 1724-1739	Succeeded by William IV and William Hyacinth
