= Henry, Prince of Nassau-Dillenburg =

- Born: 28 August 1641; Dillenburg
- Died: 18 April 1701 (aged 59); Ludwigsbrunn Castle
- Noble family: House of Nassau-Dillenburg
- Spouse: Dorothea Elizabeth of Brieg
- Father: George Louis, Prince of Nassau-Dillenburg
- Mother: Anna Augusta of Brunswick-Wolfenbüttel

Henry, Prince of Nassau-Dillenburg (born 28 August 1641 in Dillenburg; died: 18 April 1701 at Ludwigsbrunn Castle) was ruler (i.e. Fürst) of Nassau-Dillenburg from 1662 until his death.

== Life ==
Henry was the son of George Louis, Prince of Nassau-Dillenburg and his wife, Anna Augusta, a daughter of Duke Henry Julius of Brunswick-Wolfenbüttel. He studied at Herborn Academy, which could enjoy an upswing during his rule, and in France. After completing his studies, he served in the Dutch army, where he reached the rank of commander. When his grandfather, Louis Henry, Prince of Nassau-Dillenburg, died in 1662, he inherited the county, because his father had already died. When his uncle Adolph died without a male heir in 1676, he inherited Nassau-Schaumburg as well.

His reign is regarded as competent but unspectacular. He tried unsuccessfully to claim the inheritance of his father-in-law, George III of Brieg. After his death, he was succeeded by his oldest son William II, and after William II died without a son, by his younger son Christian.

== Marriage and issue ==
He married in 1663 with Dorothea Elizabeth, the daughter of Duke George III of Brieg.

- Sofie Auguste (born: 28 April 1666; died: 14 January 1733), married on 20 October 1695 at Frederiksborg Castle with Prince William Louis of Anhalt-Harzgerode (1643–1709)
- George Louis (born: 21 June 1667; died: 25 July 1681)
- Albertine (born: 8 August 1668; died: 13 August 1719), a nun at Herford Abbey
- William (born: 28 August 1670; died: 21 September 1724), married on 13 January 1699 in Harzgerode with Johanna Dorothea of Holstein-Plön (born: 24 December 1676; died: 29 November 1727), a daughter of Duke Augustus of Schleswig-Holstein-Sonderburg-Plön-Norburg
- Charles (born: 4 February 1672; died 28 April 1672)
- Adolph (born: 7 March 1673; died: 1 June 1690, fell in the Battle of Fleurus)
- Friederike Amalie (born: 28 December 1674; died: 28 July 1724)
- Elisabeth Dorothea (born: January 25, 1676; died: 25 July 1676)
- Wilhelmine Henriette (born: 6 August 1677; died: 28 August 1727)
- Frederick Henry (born: 10 November 1678; † July 24, 1681)
- Charlotte Amalia (born: 13 June 1680, died: 11 October 1738), married in April 1706 to Prince William Henry of Nassau-Usingen (1684–1718)
- Louis Henry (born 10 October 1681; died: 13 January 1710)
- John George (born: 28 January 1683; died: 10 May 1690)
- Elisabeth Dorothea (born: 5 June 1685; died: 20 January 1686)
- Christian (born: 11 August 1688; died: 28 August 1739), married on 15 April 1725 at Oranienstein Castle with Isabella of Nassau-Dietz (1692–1757)
- Henry (born and died 1689)

== Ancestors ==
Ancestors of Henry, Prince of Nassau-Dillenburg

8. George, Count of Nassau-Dillenburg
4. Louis Henry, Prince of Nassau-Dillenburg
9. Anna Amalia of Nassau-Saarbrücken
2. George Louis, Prince of Nassau-Dillenburg
10. Louis I, Count of Sayn-Wittgenstein
5. Catherine of Sayn-Wittgenstein
11. Elisabeth of Solms-Laubach
1. Henry, Prince of Nassau-Dillenburg
12. Julius, Duke of Brunswick-Lüneburg
6. Henry Julius, Duke of Brunswick-Wolfenbüttel
13. Hedwig of Brandenburg
3. Anna Augusta of Brunswick-Wolfenbüttel
14. Frederick II of Denmark
7. Elisabeth of Denmark
15. Sophie of Mecklenburg-Güstrow

Henry, Prince of Nassau-Dillenburg House of Nassau Born: 28 August 1641 Died: 18 April 1701
Preceded by Louis Henry	Prince of Nassau-Dillenburg; 1662-1701	Succeeded by William II
Preceded by Adolph	Prince of Nassau-Schaumburg; 1676-1701	Succeeded by William II
