= Maurice Henry, Prince of Nassau-Hadamar =

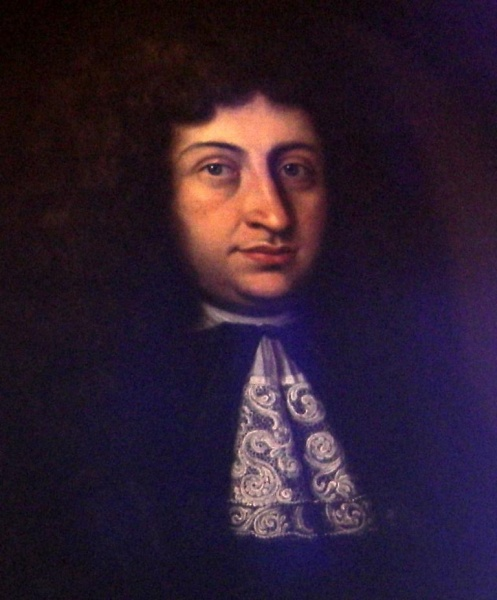
- Born: 23 April 1626; Hadamar
- Died: 24 January 1679 (aged 52); Hadamar
- Buried: Franciscan Church in Hadamar
- Noble family: House of Nassau
- Spouses: Ernestine Charlotte of Nassau-Siegen; Maria Leopoldine of Nassau-Siegen; Anna Louise of Manderscheid-Blankenheim
- Father: John Louis, Prince of Nassau-Hadamar
- Mother: Ursula of Lippe

Maurice Henry, Prince of Nassau-Hadamar (23 April 1626, in Hadamar – 24 January 1679, in Hadamar) was — after his father — the second ruler of the younger Nassau-Hadamar line of the Ottonian branch of the House of Nassau.

== Background ==
Maurice Henry was born on 23 April 1626 in Hadamar as the son of Prince John Louis of Nassau-Hadamar and his wife Countess Ursula of Lippe, the daughter of Count Simon "the Elder" of Lippe. John Louis died in 1653, and Maurice Henry succeeded him.

== Construction policies ==
Maurice Henry continued the development of the city of Hadamar his father had begun. He played a significant role in the development of infrastructure, civil order, public health, and social services. Unlike his father, he did not exert influence over neighboring principalities.

On 17 July 1663, he officially continued the construction of the St. Elisabeth Hospital at the Upper Market Square, for which his father had laid the foundation. The building was completed on 21 November 1663.

== Religion ==
After his father had converted to Catholicism, Maurice Henry was raised as a Catholic and he supported the Counter-Reformation in Hadamar. He was also responsible for the construction, between 1658 and 1666, of the Franciscan church at the spot where the church of St. Giles had been demolished. The princely family owned a crypt below the choir of this church; the first burial there took place in May 1661.

In the second half of 1675, he built the octagonal Herzenberg chapel, which later became the choir of the Herzenberg church.

== Marriages and Issue ==
Maurice Henry married three times and was the father of 13 children.

His first marriage was on 30 January 1650 in Siegen with his cousin Ernestine Charlotte (23 October 1623 – 15 August 1668 in Hadamar), the daughter of Count John VIII of Nassau-Siegen. They had the following children:

- Ernestine Ludovika (17 February 1651 in Hadamar – 29 May 1661 in Hadamar)
- John Herman Lamoral Francis (21 January 1653 in Hadamar – 18 February 1654 in Hadamar)
- Charles Philip (15 May 1656 in Hadamar – 22 July 1668 in Oirschot)
- Francis Caspar Otto (29 November 1657 in Hadamar – 24 February 1659 in Hadamar)
- Claudia Francisca (6 June 1660 in Hadamar – 6 March 1680 in Neustadt an der Waldnaab), married on 18 July 1677 in Hadamar with Prince Ferdinand Augustus of Lobkowitz (7 September 1655 – 3 October 1715)
- Maximilian Augustus Adolph (19 October 1662 in Hadamar – 26 May 1663 in Hadamar)

His second marriage was on 12 August 1669 in Siegen with Maria Leopoldine (1652 – 27 June 1675). She was a daughter of Count John Francis Desideratus of Nassau-Siegen and a niece of his first wife. They had the following children:

- Leopold Francis Ignatius (26 September 1672 in Hadamar – 19 July 1675 in Hadamar)
- Francis Alexander (27 January 1674 in Hadamar – 27 May 1711 in Hadamar), who succeeded Maurice Henry as Prince of Nassau-Hadamar
- Hugh Lothar Lamorald Augustus (4 April 1675 in Hadamar – 24 June 1675 in Hadamar)

His third marriage was on 24 October 1675 in Hachenburg with Anna Louise (11 April 1654 in Hachenburg – 23 April 1692 in Hadamar), the eldest daughter of Count Salentin Ernest of Manderscheid-Blankenheim. They had the following children:

- Damian Solomon Salentin (24 July 1676 in Hadamar – 18 October 1676 in Hadamar)
- William Bernard Louis (25 May 1677 in Hadamar – 3 October 1677 in Hadamar)
- Hugh Ferdinand Leonor Augustus (22 May 1678 in Hadamar – 16 April 1679 in Hadamar)
- Albertine Johanette Francisca Catharina (6 July 1679 in Hadamar – 24 April 1716 in Anholt), married on 20 July 1700 in Anholt to Louis Otto, Prince of Salm (d. 23 November 1738)

== Ancestors ==
Ancestors of Maurice Henry, Prince of Nassau-Hadamar

16. John V, Count of Nassau-Siegen
8. William I, Count of Nassau-Siegen
17. Elisabeth of Hesse-Marburg
4. John VI, Count of Nassau-Dillenburg
18. Bodo III, Count of Stolberg-Wernigerode
9. Juliana of Stolberg-Wernigerode
19. Anna of Eppstein-Königstein
2. John Louis, Prince of Nassau-Hadamar
20. William I, Count of Sayn-Wittgenstein
10. Louis I, Count of Sayn-Wittgenstein
21. Johannetta of Isenburg-Neumagen
5. Johannetta of Sayn-Wittgenstein
22. Philip, Count of Solms-Braunfels
11. Anna of Solms-Braunfels
23. Anna of Tecklenburg
1. Maurice Henry, Prince of Nassau-Hadamar
24. Simon V, Count of Lippe
12. Bernhard VIII, Count of Lippe
25. Magdalena of Mansfeld-Mittelort
6. Simon VI, Count of Lippe
26. Philip III, Count of Waldeck-Eisenberg
13. Catherine of Waldeck-Eisenberg
27. Anne of Cleves
3. Ursula of Lippe
28. Jobst I, Count of Holstein-Schauenburg
14. Otto IV of Schaumburg
29. Maria of Nassau-Dietz
7. Elisabeth of Schaumburg
30. Barnim XI, Duke of Pomerania
15. Maria of Pomerania-Stettin
31. Anna of Brunswick-Lüneburg

Maurice Henry, Prince of Nassau-Hadamar House of Nassau Born: 23 April 1626 Died: 24 January 1679
Preceded by John Louis	Prince of Nassau-Hadamar; 1653-1679	Succeeded by Francis Alexander
