= Francis Alexander, Prince of Nassau-Hadamar =

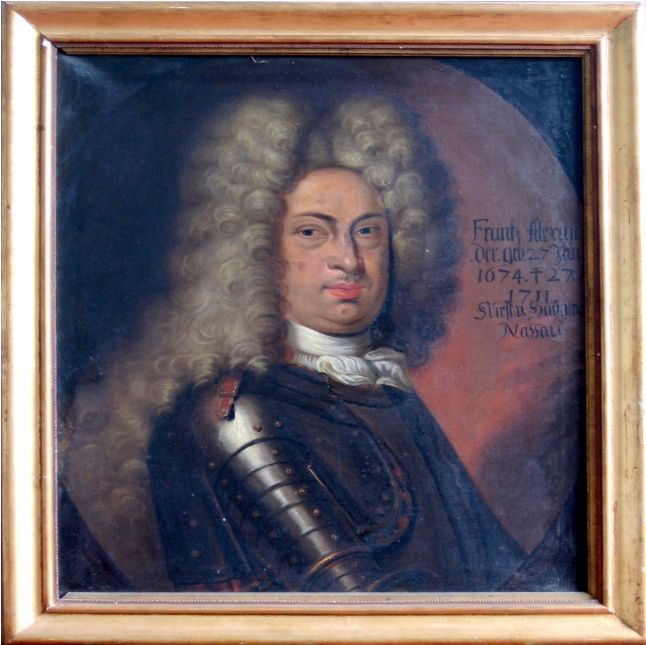
- Francis Alexander's portrait at the City Museum in Hadamar
- Born: 27 January 1674; Hadamar
- Died: 27 May 1711 (aged 37); Hadamar
- Noble family: House of Nassau
- Spouse: Elizabeth Catherine Felicitas of Hesse-Rotenburg
- Father: Maurice Henry, Prince of Nassau-Hadamar
- Mother: Maria Leopoldine of Nassau-Siegen

Francis Alexander von Nassau-Hadamar (27 January 1674 in Hadamar – 27 May 1711 in ibid.) was the last prince of Nassau-Hadamar.

== Life ==
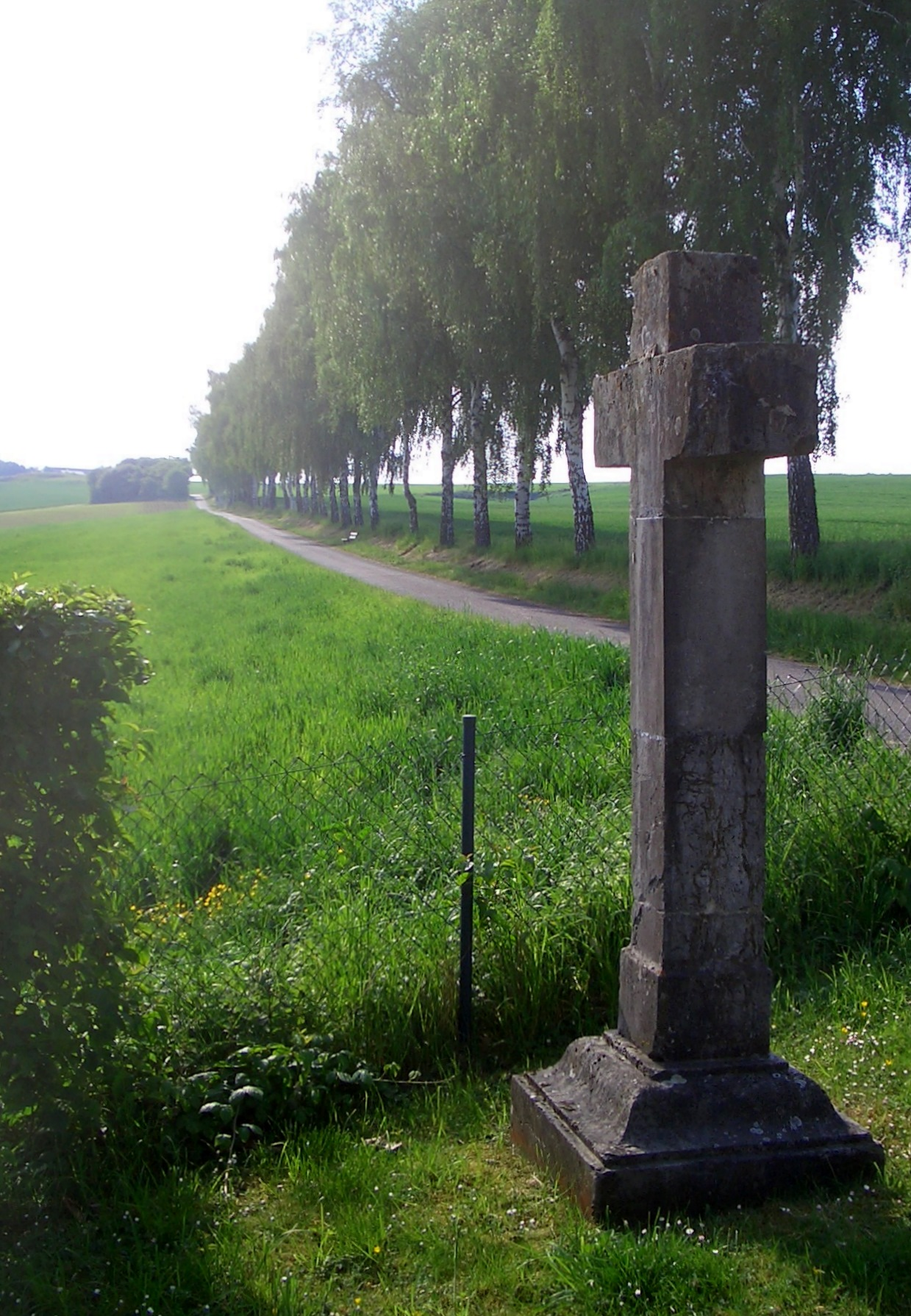
Memorial cross for Francis Alexander on the ancient road from Hadamar to Limburg an der Lahn

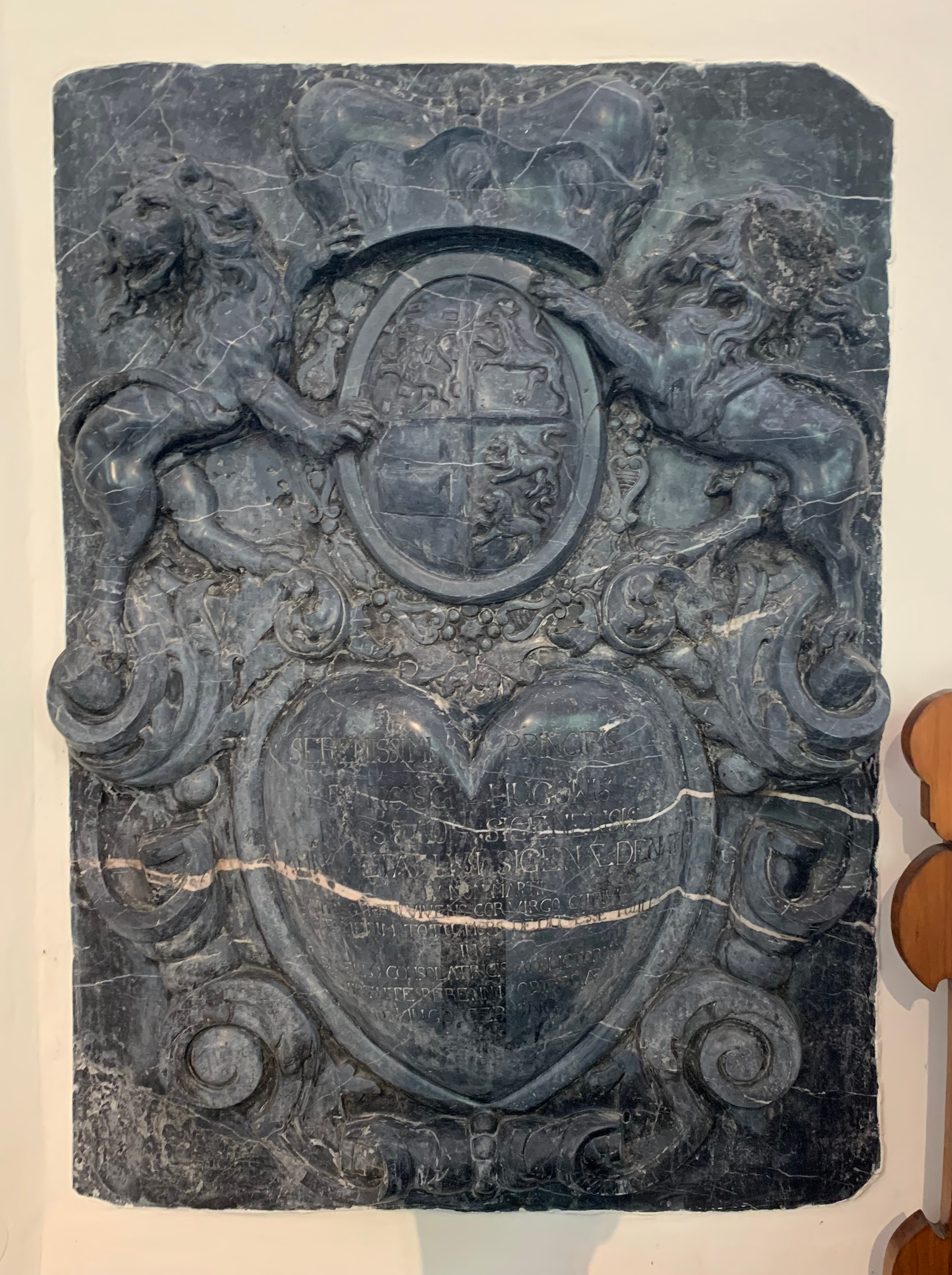
Heart Epitaph for Hadamar Francis Alexander in the Herzenberg Chapel in Hadamar

Francis Alexander was the son of prince Maurice Henry of Nassau-Hadamar (23 April 1626 – 24 January 1679) and his second wife Maria Leopoldine of Nassau-Siegen (1652–1675). At the age of 6 years he inherited of Nassau-Hadamar. His guardian and ruler of Nassau-Hadamar during his youth was his uncle Francis Bernard (21 September 1637 – 15 September 1695). In 1710, Francis Alexander was appointed Judge of the Reichskammergericht in Wetzlar. He was sworn in on 28 January 1711.

He died as a result of a fall from his horse near the Limburg Gate (now called the Hammelburg) in Hadamar on 27 May 1711. He was buried in the princely crypt in the Franciscan church at the Mönchsberg in Hadamar, wearing the robe of a Reichskammergericht judge. His heart was placed in the St. Mary chapel on the Herzenberg, like the heart of his uncle Francis Bernard 16 years earlier.

A memorial cross was erected at the site of the fatal accident. It bears the inscription:

VERGES ICH DEIN - VERGIS O GOTT MEIN F.A.F.Z.N.H. ANNO 1711 D. 26. MAY.

(If I forget Thee, o God, forgive me. F.A.F.Z.N.H. [Franz Alexander, Fürst zu Nassau-Hadamar], 26 May 1711.)

The cross was later moved by about 300 meters and is now located on the southeastern edge of Hadamar, but still on the old road connecting Hadamar and Limburg an der Lahn.

== Marriage and issue ==
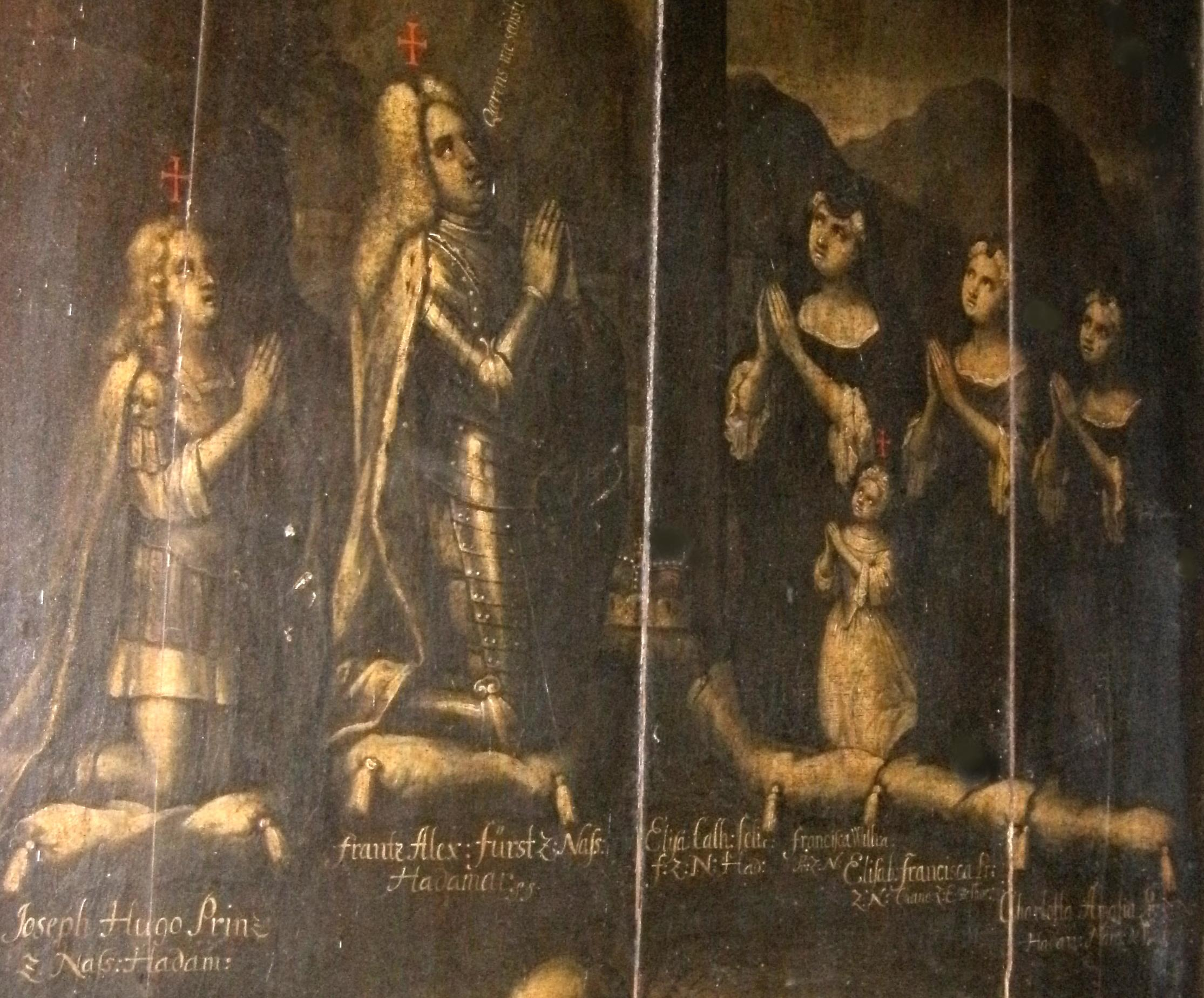
The family of Prince Francis Alexander in prayer (detail)

On 18 October 1695 in Lovosice (Bohemia), Francis Alexander married Elizabeth Catherine Felicitas (14 February 1677 Rheinfels Castle near St. Goar – 15 May 1739 in Dietz, buried in the Franciscan monastery St. Martin at Boppard), the daughter of William "the Elder" of Hesse-Rheinfels-Rotenburg. The couple had the following children:

1. Francisca Maria Anna Wilhelmina (16 September 1696 – 18 June 1697)
2. Elisabeth (21 September 1698 – 2 October 1724 in Roermond), a nun at Thorn and Essen
3. Joseph Hugo (18 April 1701 – 6 December 1708)
4. Charlotte Wilhelmine Amalie Alexandrina (21 September 1703 – 25 September 1740), married on 29 September 1721 Jean Philippe Eugène de Mérode (1674–1732). A descendant from this marriage is Prince Albert-Henri de Merode, who was born in Brussels on 8 September 1975 and who married Countess Marie Christine of Soden-Frauenhofen on 20 July 2003 in Alt-Fraunhofen.

The spouses separated in 1705. Ernestine, the sister of the Princess, many have caused increasing tensions between the couple. Even after Ernestine had entered the convent at Altenberg, near Wetzlar, and despite mediations efforts by Archbishop John VIII of Trier and Emperor Joseph I, Francis Alexander and his wife could not reconcile their differences. From 1705, they lived separately: Francis Alexander and the children resided at Hadamar Castle, his wife resided at Mengerskirchen Castle. Another mediation attempt in on 23 October 1708 in Hadamar also failed. Nevertheless, the death of their son, Hereditary Prince Joseph Hugo, brought them closer together.

When Francis Alexander died in 1711, he had no male heir. After lengthy negotiations, Nassau-Hadamar was divided between the rulers of the remaining Ottonian lines: Nassau-Dietz, Nassau-Dillenburg, the Catholic line in Nassau-Siegen and the Calvinist line in Nassau-Siegen. The town of Hadamar was in the part that was given to the Catholic line.

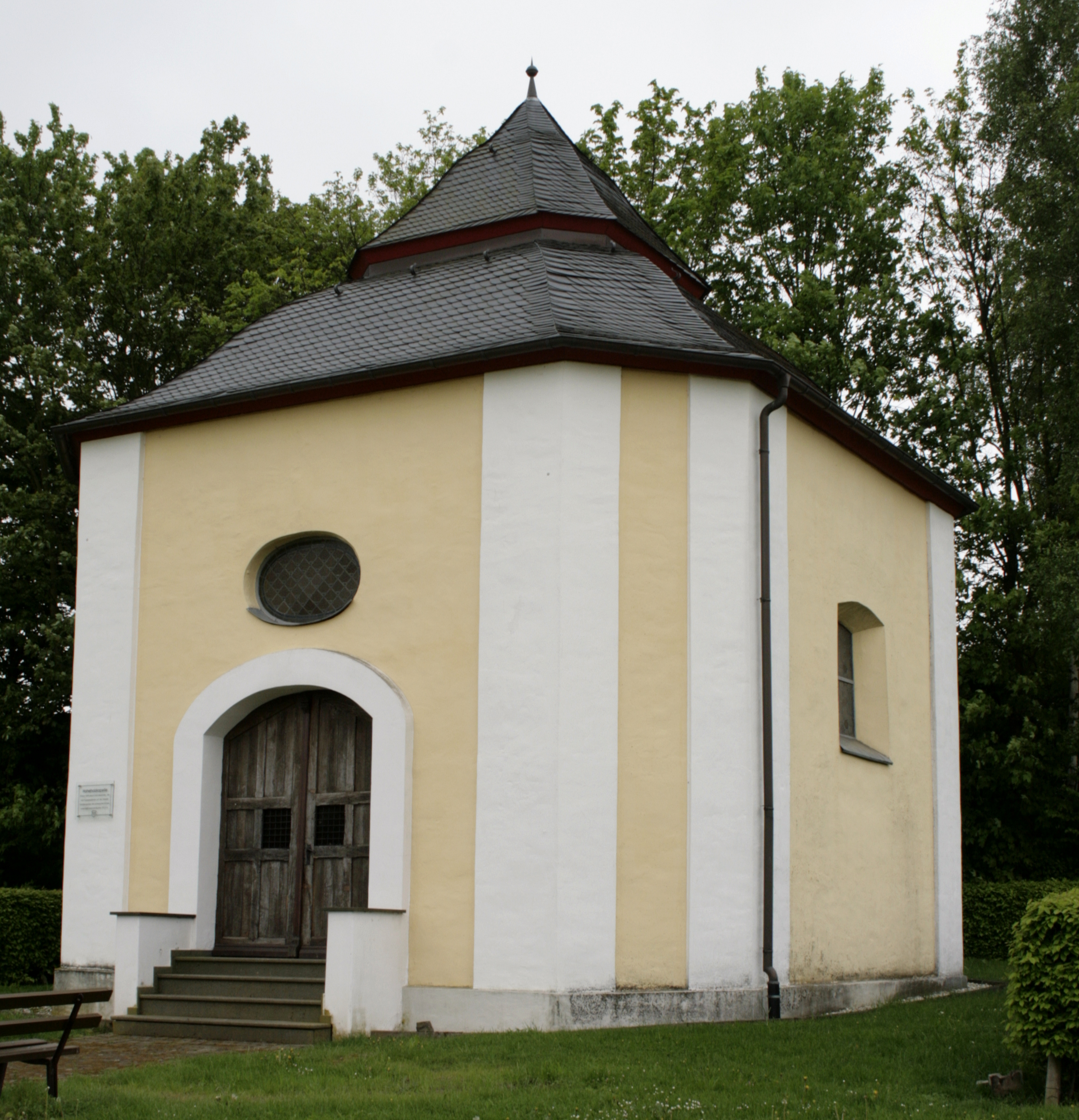
Hoheholz chapel

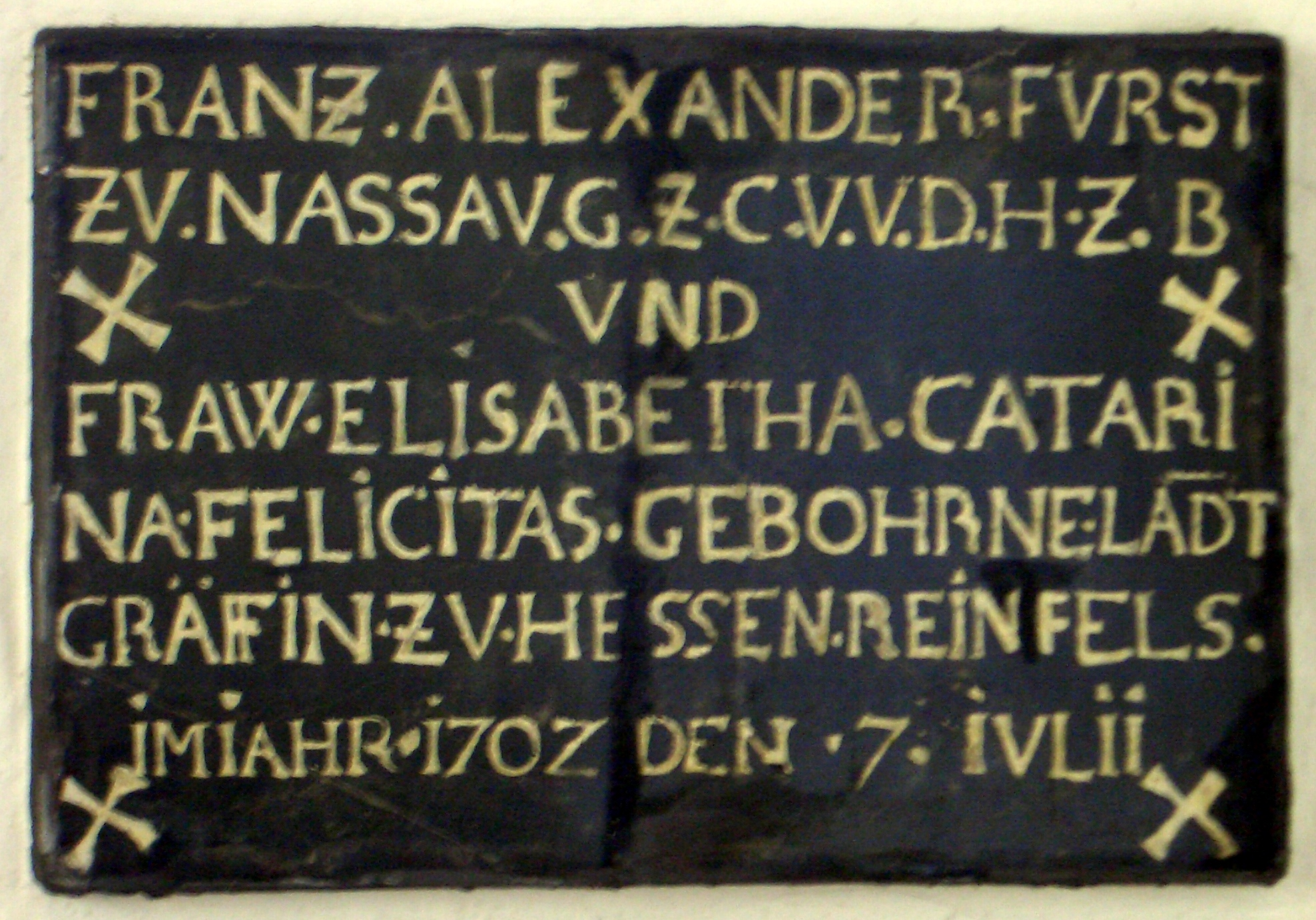
plaque in the Nothelfer chapel in Steinbach

At the front of the princely crypt of the Nassau-Hadamar line under the Franciscan church on Mount St. Giles, there is a painting of the prince, kneeling as he prays with his family to the crucified Jesus. Red crosses are painted above the heads of John Alexander, Joseph Hugo and Francisca Wilhelmina, who were already deceased when the painting was created. Francis Alexander is shown wearing a metal armour and beside him is a gleaming crown, decorated with pearls and a golden cross.

Francis Alexander's widow, Elizabeth Catherine Felicitas, remarried on 6 September 1727 in Nuremberg to Count Anton Ferdinand of Attems, who was also a widower and was almost 14 years younger than her. He had lived at Sterneck Castle with his first wife, Baroness Marie Auguste of Ow-Hirrlingen. Elizabeth Catherine Felicitas died on 15 May 1739, at the age of 62, in Dietz on the Lahn.

== Buildings ==
A number of impressive building projects were undertaken during Francis Alexander's reign. The stucco decoration of Hadamar Castle is noteworthy, as are three chapels:

- The Hoheholz chapel, west of Hadamar, constructed in 1699
- The Nothelfer chapel in Steinbach, constructed in 1702, originally dedicated to St. Mary
- The Chapel of the Cross in Niederzeuzheim, constructed in 1706

== Ancestors ==
Ancestors of Francis Alexander, Prince of Nassau-Hadamar

16. William I, Count of Nassau-Siegen
8. John VI, Count of Nassau-Dillenburg
17. Juliana of Stolberg-Wernigerode
4. John Louis of Nassau-Hadamar
18. Louis I, Count of Sayn-Wittgenstein
9. Johannetta of Sayn-Wittgenstein
19. Anna of Solms-Braunfels
2. Maurice Henry, Prince of Nassau-Hadamar
20. Bernhard VIII, Count of Lippe
10. Simon VI, Count of Lippe
21. Catherine of Waldeck
5. Ursula of Lippe
22. Otto IV of Schaumburg
11. Elisabeth of Schaumburg
23. Maria of Pomerania-Stettin
1. Francis Alexander, Prince of Nassau-Hadamar
24. John VII, Count of Nassau-Siegen
12. John VIII, Count of Nassau-Siegen
25. Magdalene of Waldeck-Wildungen
6. John Francis Desideratus of Nassau-Siegen
26. Lamoral, 1st Prince of Ligne
13. Ernestine Yolande de Ligne
27. Anne-Marie de Melun
3. Maria Leopoldine of Nassau-Siegen
28. John George, Count of Königsegg
14. John George, Count of Königsegg-Aulendorf
29. Kunigunde of Waldburg-Wolfegg-Zeil
7. Johanna Claudia of Königsegg-Rotenfels-Aulendorf
30. Caspar Marcus, Count of Hohenems
15. Eleonore of Hohenems
31. Eleonore of Welsperg-Primör

Francis Alexander, Prince of Nassau-Hadamar House of Nassau Born: 27 January 1674 Died: 27 May 1711
Preceded by Maurice Henry	Prince of Nassau-Hadamar	Succeeded by William IV as Prince of Orange-Nassau
Preceded by Maurice Henry	Prince of Nassau-Hadamar	Succeeded by William II as Prince of Nassau-Dillenburg
Preceded by Maurice Henry	Prince of Nassau-Hadamar	Succeeded by Frederick William Adolf as Prince of Nassau-Siegen
