= Gustav Ricker =

German physician and pathologist (1870–1948)

Gustav Wilhelm August Josef Ricker (November 2, 1870 – September 23, 1948) was a German physician and pathologist born in Hadamar, Hesse-Nassau.

He studied philosophy and medicine at several universities, earning his doctorate in 1893 at the University of Berlin. In 1897 he received his habilitation under Albert Thierfelder (1842–1908) at the University of Rostock, and from 1906 until 1933 was head of pathology at the city hospitals (Altstadt and Sudenburg) in Magdeburg. Afterwards, he worked as a private scholar in Berlin and Dresden.

Ricker is remembered for his Stufengesetz (law of stages), relating the intensity of neural stimulation to blood flow in capillaries, and also Relationspathologie (relational pathology), in which he maintains that the root of pathological processes are a neural process and not a cellular process.

Today in Magdeburg, Gustav-Ricker-Straße and Gustav-Ricker-Krankenhaus are named in his honor.

== Selected publications ==
- Entwurf einer Relationspathologie, 1905
- Grundlinien einer Logik der Physiologie als reiner Naturwissenschaft, 1912
- Pathologie als Naturwissenschaft – Relationspathologie – Für Pathologen, Physiologen, Mediziner und Biologen, 1924
- Wissenschaftstheoretische Aufsätze für Ärzte, 1936
