= George Louis, Prince of Nassau-Dillenburg =

German noble (1618–1656)

- Born: 4 March 1618
- Died: 19 May 1656 (aged 38)
- Buried: Dillenburg
- Noble family: House of Nassau
- Spouse: Anna Augusta of Brunswick-Wolfenbüttel
- Father: Louis Henry, Prince of Nassau-Dillenburg
- Mother: Catherine of Sayn-Wittgenstein

George Louis of Nassau-Dillenburg (4 March 1618 – 19 May 1656) was Hereditary Prince of Nassau-Dillenburg.

== Early life ==
He was the son of Prince Louis Henry, Prince of Nassau-Dillenburg and his wife, Countess Katharina of Sayn-Wittgenstein (1588–1651), daughter of Louis I, Count of Sayn-Wittgenstein and his second wife, Countess Elisabeth von Solms-Laubach (1549–1599).

== Marriage ==
George Louis married on 19 February 1638 in Coppenbrügge to Princess Anna Augusta of Brunswick-Wolfenbüttel (1612–1673), the daughter of Henry Julius, Duke of Brunswick-Wolfenbüttel and Elizabeth of Denmark.

== Death ==
He never inherited the principality, because he died before his father. George Louis died on 19 August 1656 at the age of 38 and was buried in Dillenburg the next day.

== Issue ==
- Elisabeth Catherine (1639–1641)
- Sophia Eleonora (1640–1712)
- Henry (1641–1701), succeeded George Louis's father as Prince of Nassau-Dillenburg
- Elisabeth Charlotte (1643–1686), married firstly to Count August of Legnica and secondly to Count Ferdinand Gobert von Aspremont-Lynden
- stillborn son (1645)
- Elisabeth Louise (1648–1670)
- Anna Catherine (born 1651)
