= William II of Nassau-Dillenburg =

William II, Prince of Nassau-Dillenburg
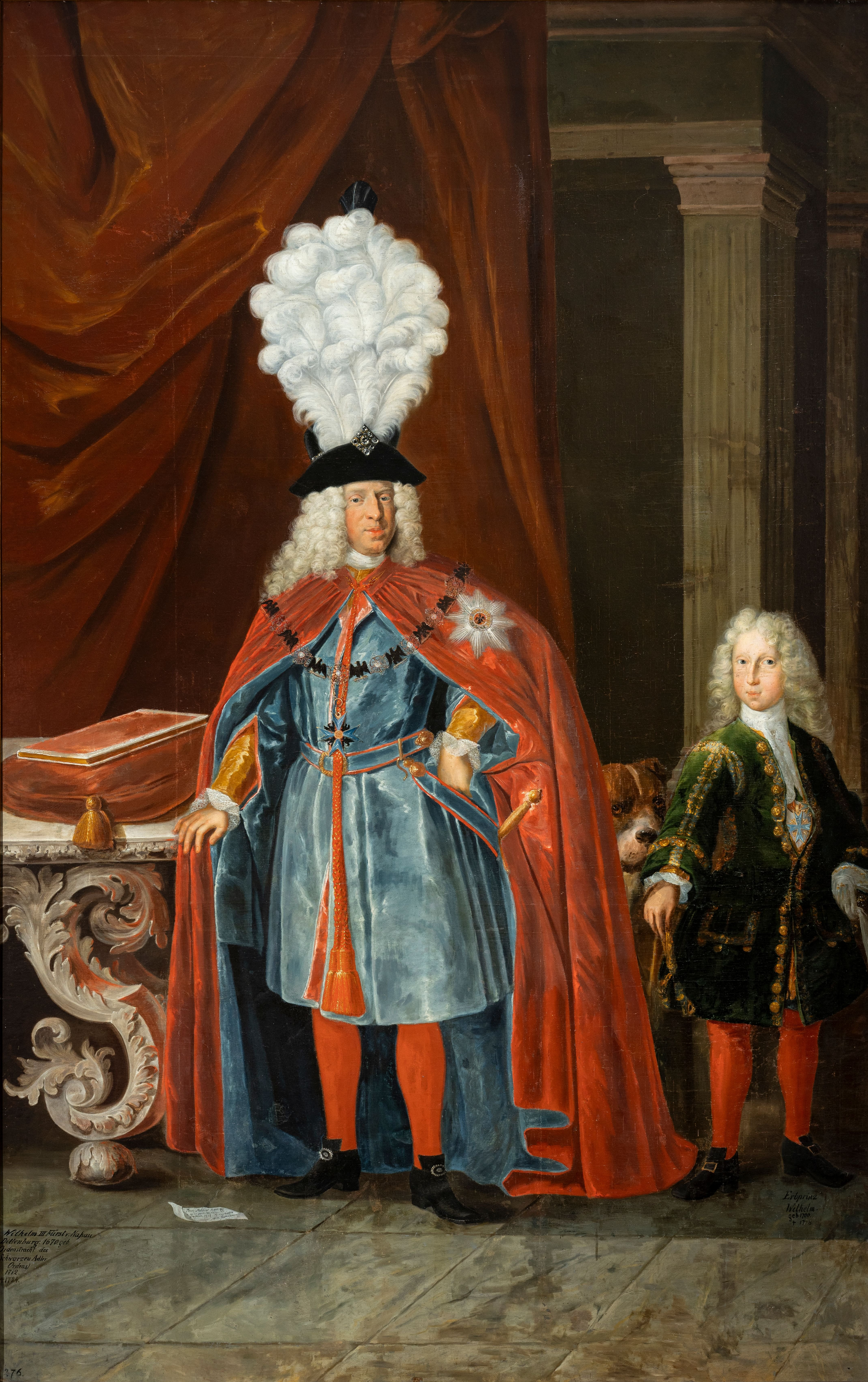
- Portrait of Prince Wilhelm II wearing the robes of the Order of the Black Eagle.
- Born: 28 August 1670
- Died: 21 September 1724 (aged 54); Dillenburg
- Buried: Evangelical City Church in Dillenburg
- Noble family: House of Nassau-Dillenburg
- Spouse: Johanna Dorothea of Schleswig-Holstein-Sonderburg-Plön-Norburg
- Father: Henry, Prince of Nassau-Dillenburg
- Mother: Dorothea Elisabeth of Legnica-Brzeg

William II, Prince of Nassau-Dillenburg (28 August 1670 – 21 September 1724 in Dillenburg) was the ruler (i.e. Fürst) of Nassau-Dillenburg from 1701 until his death. His parents were Henry, Prince of Nassau-Dillenburg (1641–1701) and his wife Princess Dorothea Elisabeth of Legnica-Brzeg (1646–1691).

== Life ==
Around 1694 he made his grand tour which took him through Germany, the Netherlands, England, Denmark, Sweden and Italy. After his father's death in 1701 he inherited Nassau-Dillenburg. In 1711, Francis Alexander died, and William II inherited a share of Nassau-Hadamar. Negotiations dragged on until 1717; William II received Mengerskirchen, Lahr in the Westerwald, and Frickhofen.

In 1709, he was appointed Knight of the Order of Saint Hubert, which had been revived by Elector Palatine John William in September 1708.

William II died in 1724 and was interred in the Evangelical City Church in Dillenburg. As he had no male heir, his principality was inherited by his brother Christian.

== Marriage and issue ==
He married on 13 January 1699 in Harzgerode to Johanna Dorothea (24 December 1676 – 29 November 1727), the daughter of Duke Augustus of Schleswig-Holstein-Sonderburg-Plön-Norburg. They had two children:

- Henry Augustus William (15 November 1700 – 22 August 1718)
- Elisabeth Charlotte (14 July 1703 – 22 June 1720)

The family was interred in the Evangelical City Church in Dillenburg.

== Footnotes ==
William II of Nassau-Dillenburg House of Nassau Born: 28 August 1670 Died: 21 September 1724
Preceded by Henry	Prince of Nassau-Dillenburg; 1701-1724	Succeeded by Christian
Preceded by Francis Alexander	Prince of Nassau-Hadamar; 1711-1724	Succeeded by Christian
