= Albert, Count of Nassau-Dillenburg =

Count of Nassau-Dillenburg (1623-1626)

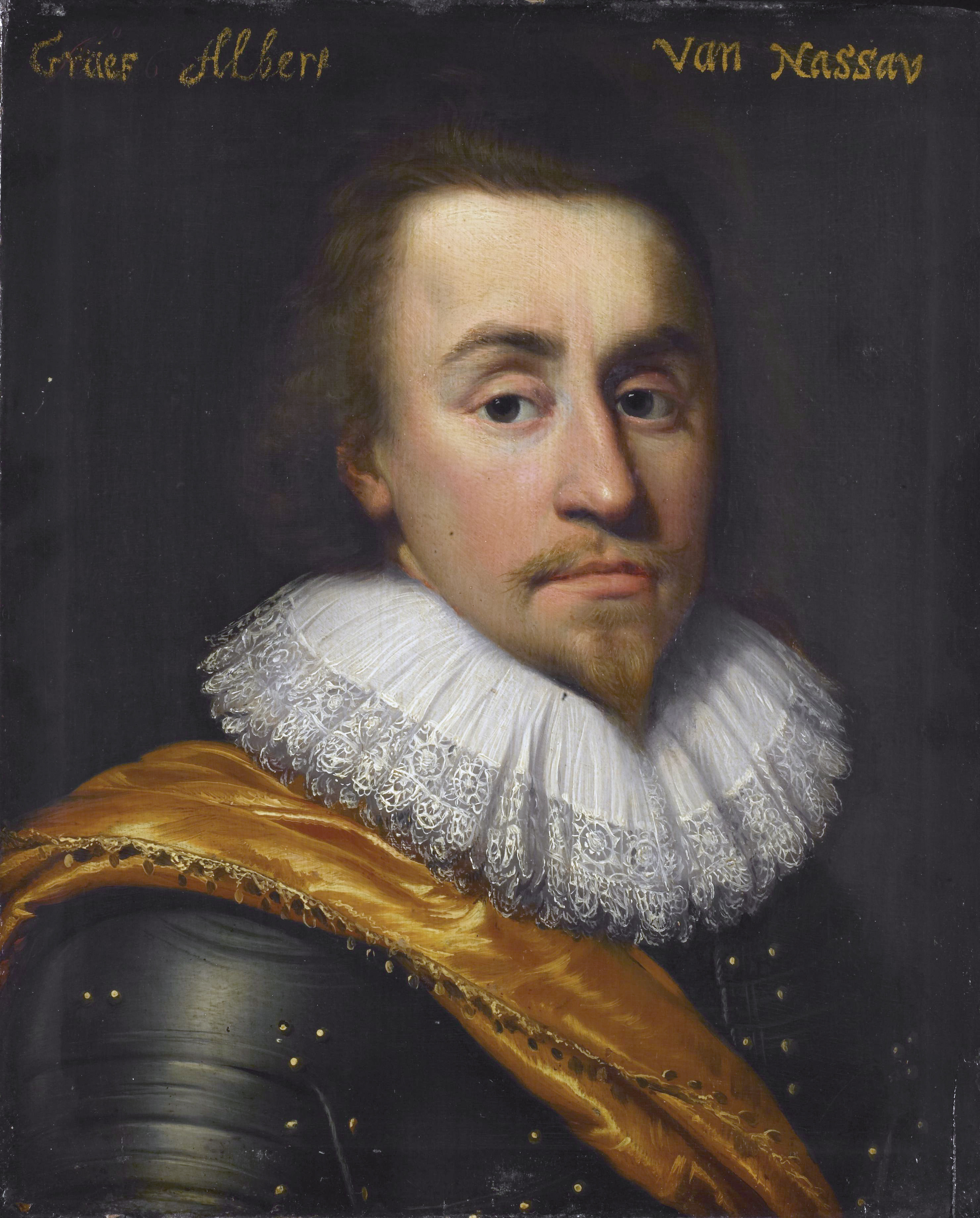
- Born: 1 November 1596; Dillenburg
- Died: 16 June 1626 (aged 29); Quakenbrück
- Noble family: House of Nassau
- Father: George, Count of Nassau-Dillenburg
- Mother: Anna Amalia of Nassau-Saarbrücken

Albert, Count of Nassau-Dillenburg (1 November 1596 in Dillenburg – 16 June 1626 in Quakenbrück) was a son of Count George of Nassau-Dillenburg and his first wife, Anna Amalia of Nassau-Saarbruucken. After his father died in 1623, he ruled Nassau-Dillenburg jointly with his elder brother Louis Henry until Albert died himself in 1626.

Albert, Count of Nassau-Dillenburg House of Nassau Born: 1 November 1596 Died: 16 June 1626
Preceded by George	Count of Nassau-Dillenburg; 1623-1626; With: Louis Henry	Succeeded by Louis Henry as Prince of Nassau-Dillenburg
