= John Louis of Nassau-Hadamar =

German nobleman and member of the House of Nassau (1590-1653)

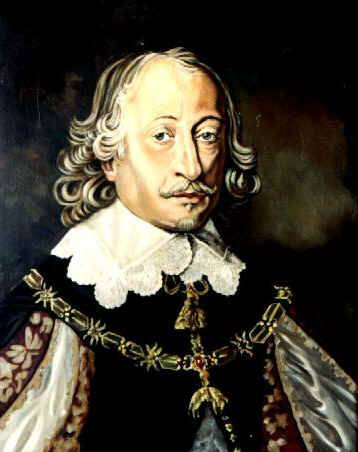
- John Louis of Nassau-Hadamar
- Born: 6 August 1590; Dillenburg
- Died: 10 March 1653 (aged 62); Hadamar
- Noble family: House of Nassau
- Spouse: Ursula of Lippe
- Father: John VI, Count of Nassau-Dillenburg
- Mother: Johannetta of Sayn-Wittgenstein

John Louis of Nassau-Hadamar, (Dillenburg, 6 August 1590 – Hadamar, 10 March 1653) and also known in German as Johann Ludwig, was a German nobleman and member of the House of Nassau who is best known for his role as an aide to the head of the imperial (Holy Roman Empire) delegation for the Peace of Westphalia, Count Maximilian von Trautmansdorff.

He was the son of John VI, Count of Nassau-Dillenburg and his third wife Johannetta of Sayn-Wittgenstein.

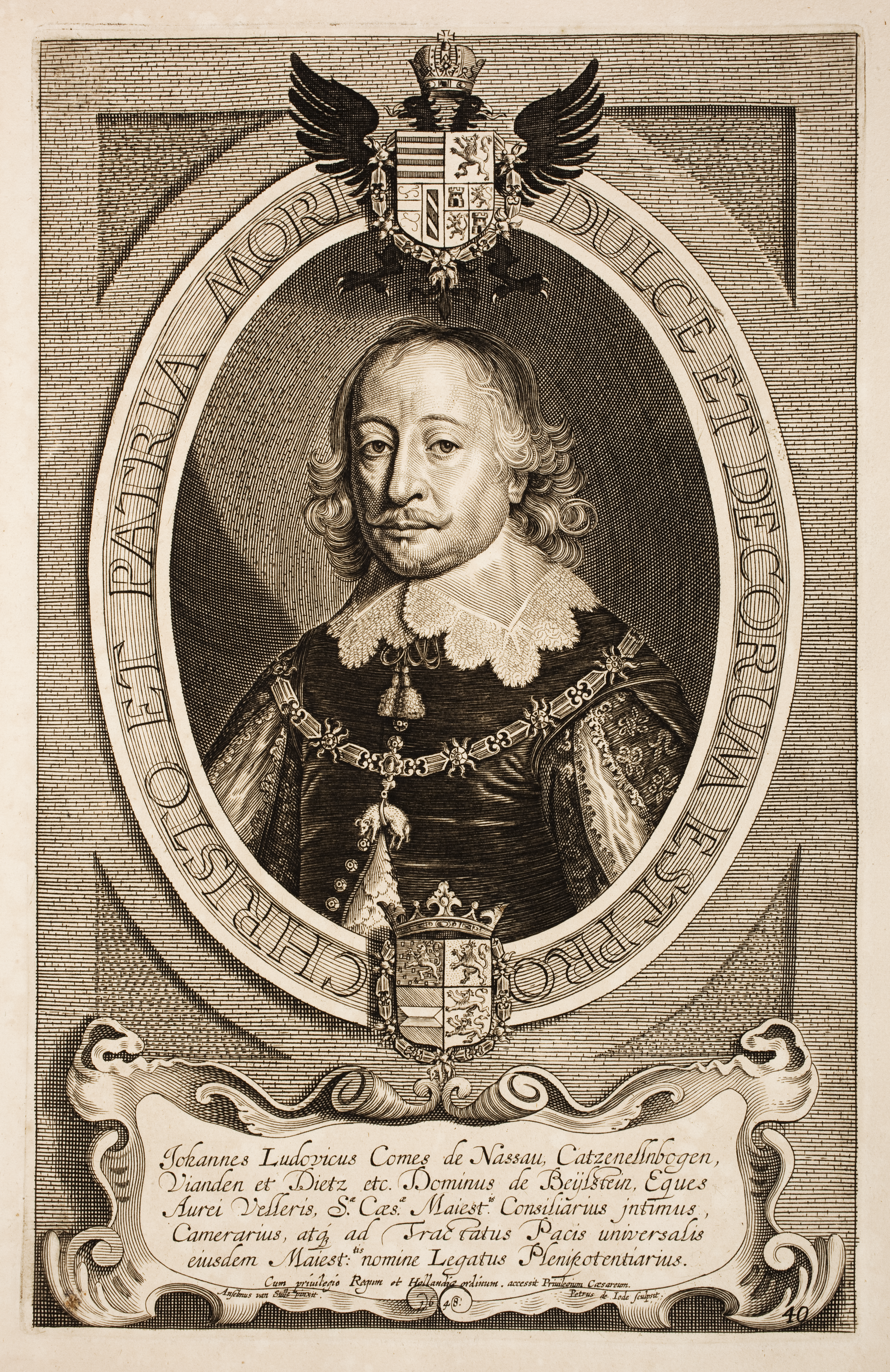
Engraving of John Louis of Nassau-Hadamar

When his father died in 1606, Nassau was divided amongst his five sons. William Louis received Nassau-Dillenburg, John received Nassau-Siegen, George received Nassau-Beilstein, Ernst Casimir received Nassau-Dietz and John Louis received Nassau-Hadamar.

== Marriage and children ==
In 1617 he married in Countess Ursula of Lippe, daughter of Simon VI, Count of Lippe. They had 14 children, of whom six survived infancy :

- Johanna Elisabeth (1619–1647) married Frederick, Prince of Anhalt-Harzgerode
- Sofie Magdalene (1622–1658) married Louis Henry, Prince of Nassau-Dillenburg
- Maurice Henry (1626–1679), his successor
- Hermann Otto (1627–1660), a canon in Trier, Mainz and Cologne
- Johann Ernst (1631–1651), a canon in Cologne and Münster
- Franz Bernhard (1637–1695), a canon in Cologne

== Career ==
When John Louis was 28 years old, the Thirty Years' War broke out. He tried in vain to keep Nassau-Hadamar out of the war. His lands suffered from the passage of multitudes of Imperial and Protestant troops, which plundered and requisitioned them into poverty. Highly indebted, John Louis was forced to sell Esterau to Peter Melander Graf von Holzappel in 1643.

John Louis was raised a Calvinist, as was sent in 1629 by his brothers as a diplomat to Vienna to negotiate a truce with Emperor Ferdinand II. Here John Louis converted to Catholicism under influence of Wilhelm Lamormaini. John Louis was much appreciated by the Emperor for his diplomatic skills. In 1638 he successfully led the peace negotiations in Cologne and Munster. In 1645 he was added to the Imperial delegation under Maximilian von und zu Trauttmansdorff who negotiated the Peace of Westphalia. By 1647 he had replaced Trauttmansdorff as head of the Imperial delegation, and it was he who finalized the treaty.

For this, he was awarded the Order of the Golden Fleece by King Philip IV of Spain.

Ferdinand III, Holy Roman Emperor made him a Prince (Fürst) and gave him a large sum of money.
