= Louis Henry, Prince of Nassau-Dillenburg =

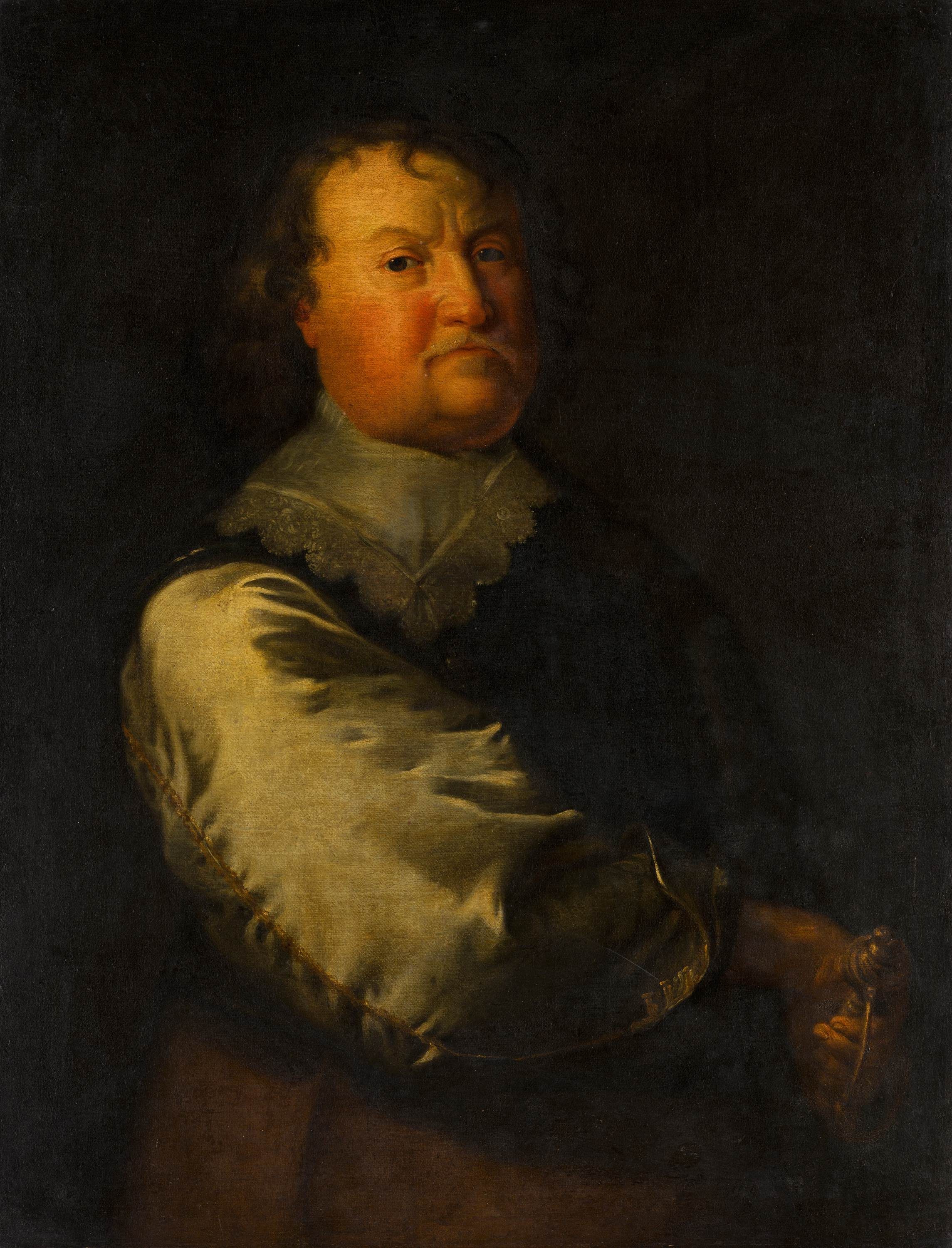
- Louis Henry, Prince of Nassau-Dillenburg
- Born: 9 May 1594; Saarbrücken
- Died: 12 July 1662 (aged 68); Dillenburg
- Noble family: House of Nassau
- Spouses: Catherine of Sayn-Wittgenstein; Elisabeth of Salm-Dhaun; Sofie Magdalene of Nassau-Hadamar
- Father: George, Count of Nassau-Dillenburg
- Mother: Anna Amalia of Nassau-Saarbrücken

Louis Henry of Nassau-Dillenburg (9 May 1594 in Saarbrücken – 12 July 1662 in Dillenburg), was Count, and from 1654 Prince of Nassau-Dillenburg. During the Thirty Years' War, he was a senior officer. He climbed to the rank of Major General. Before 1635, he served on the Protestant side; after 1635, he served in the imperial army.

== Early life ==
He was born as the eight child and sixth son of the Count George, Count of Nassau-Dillenburg and his wife, Countess Anna Amalie of Nassau-Saarbrücken (1565–1605). Before ruling Nassau-Dillenburg, his father was reigning count of Nassau-Beilstein.

== Early years ==
Louis Henry was first educated at the court in Dillenburg and later at Herborn Academy. He then made a Grand Tour to France and the Netherlands. He received his military training under Prince Maurice of Orange-Nassau. As early as 1614, he participated in the relief of Emmerich, which was besieged by the Spanish.

Louis Henry and his brother Albert inherited Nassau-Dillenburg in 1623. They ruled jointly, until Albert died in 1626 and Louis Henry became the sole ruler.

== Councillor Hoen and domestic policies ==
The Emperor had outlawed the Counts of Nassau-Dillenburg and Nassau-Hadamar for allegedly supporting Elector Palatine Frederick V. The Emperor had assigned their possessions to John VIII of Nassau-Siegen. This ruling was never carried out, thanks to the efforts of John Louis of Nassau-Hadamar. Even so, the military occupation of Nassau-Dillenburg from 1622 onwards, put a high strain on his land. Louis Henry saw reducing this damage as his main task. He only played a relatively small rôle himself. Policies were mainly drawn up and carried out by his councillor, the publicist and professor Philipp Heinrich Hoen (Hoenosius). Hoen also administered the county during Henry Louis long periods of absence. He also represented the interests of the House of Nassau and the Wetterau Association of Imperial Counts in the negotiations that led to the Peace of Westphalia.

== In Protestant service ==
Louis Henry initially stood on the side of the Protestant Union. He joined the army of King Gustavus Adolphus of Sweden as a colonel. He led an infantry regiment and later a cavalry regiment. His troops distinguished themselves in various battles, and Louis Henry himself showed personal bravery. He distinguished himself in particular during the storming of fortified cities and fortresses, such as the capture of Braunfels in 1635.

== In the imperial service ==
Later that year, when the war seemed to turn against the Swedes, Louis Henry changed sides and joined the imperial side. He served the emperor as a senior officer and united his forces with those of Landgrave George II of Hesse-Darmstadt. In 1637, he held the rank of Major general and marched into Saxony. He then enjoyed the imperial favour at the court in Prague. In 1654, he was rewarded for his services by being raised to Imperial Prince.

== Domestic policies after 1649 ==
After Hoen died in 1649, Louis Henry tried to enforce an absolutist policy in Dillenburg. He was only partially successful. He also attempted to support Herborn Academy, which had been badly affected by the war, but eventually lost interest.

Louis Henry died in 1662. Since his eldest son, George Louis had already died in 1656, Dillenburg was inherited by his grandson Henry.

== Personal life ==
Louis Henry was married three times. His first wife was Katharina of Sayn-Wittgenstein (1588–1651), the daughter of Louis I, Count of Sayn-Wittgenstein. The couple had the following children:

- Anne (1616–1649), married:
  1. in 1638 with Count Philip of Wied (died 1638)
  2. in 1646 with Count Christian of Sayn-Wittgenstein (died 1675)
- George Louis (1618–1656), Hereditary Prince of Nassau-Dillenburg, married in 1638 with Princess Augusta Anna Brunswick-Wolfenbüttel, the daughter of Duke Henry Julius, Duke of Brunswick-Wolfenbüttel (1612–1673)
- Elisabeth (1619–1665)
- Juliana (1620–1622)
- Albert (1621–1622)
- Catherine (1622–1631)
- Louise (1623–1665), married in 1646 Count John Louis of Isenburg-Offenbach (died 1685)
- Unnamed daughter (1624)
- Henry (1626–1627)
- Magdalena (1628–1663), married in 1662 with Count Christian Maurice of Isenburg-Büdingen (died 1664)
- Adolph (1629–1676), Prince of Nassau-Schaumburg, married in 1653 with Countess Elisabeth Charlotte von Holzappel (1640–1707), the daughter of Peter Melander, Count of Holzappel and his wife, Baroness Agnes von Efferen genannt Hall (1697-1666)
- Philip (1630–1657)
- twins (1631)
- Maria Eleonora (1632–1633)

After Catherine's death, he married Wild- and Rhinegravine Elizabeth of Salm-Dhaun (1593–1656), widow of Count Philipp Ludwig zu Ysenburg und Büdingen (1593–1616) and of Count Reinhard, Count zu Solms-Hungen (1573–1630). She was the daughter of Wild- and Rhinegrave Adolph Henry of Salm-Dhaun-Neufviller (1557–1606) and his wife, Countess Countess Juliana von Nassau-Dillenburg (1565–1630). However, she died soon after the wedding.

In 1656, he married his third wife. She was Princess Sophie Magdalene of Nassau-Hadamar (1622–1658), the daughter of Prince John Louis of Nassau-Hadamar and his wife, Countess Ursula zur Lippe (1598–1638). They had three children:

- Augustus (1657–1680)
- Charles (1658–1659)
- Louis (1658–1658)

== Ancestors ==
Ancestors of Louis Henry, Prince of Nassau-Dillenburg

16. John V, Count of Nassau-Siegen
8. William I, Count of Nassau-Siegen
17. Elisabeth of Hesse-Marburg
4. John VI, Count of Nassau-Dillenburg
18. Bodo III, Count of Stolberg-Wernigerode
9. Juliana of Stolberg
19. Anna of Eppstein-Königstein
2. George, Count of Nassau-Dillenburg
20. John IV, Landgrave of Leuchtenberg
10. George III, Landgrave of Leuchtenberg
21. Margaret of Schwarzburg
5. Elisabeth of Leuchtenberg
22. Frederick I, Margrave of Brandenburg-Ansbach
11. Barbara of Brandenburg-Ansbach-Kulmbach
23. Sophia Jagiellon, Margravine of Brandenburg-Ansbach
1. Louis Henry, Prince of Nassau-Dillenburg
24. Louis I, Count of Nassau-Weilburg
12. Philip III, Count of Nassau-Weilburg
25. Marie Margaret of Nassau-Wiesbaden
6. Philip IV, Count of Nassau-Weilburg
26. John V, Count of Isenburg-Budingen
13. Amalie of Isenburg-Büdingen
27. Anna of Schwarzburg-Blankenburg
3. Anna Amalia of Nassau-Saarbrücken
28. Dietrich IV of Manderscheid-Schleiden
14. Francis of Manderscheid-Schleiden-Virneburg
29. Elisabeth of Neufchâtel
7. Erika of Manderscheid-Blankenheim
30. Salentin VII of Isenburg-Neumagen
15. Anna of Isenburg-Neumagen
31. Elisabeth of Hunolstein-Neumagen

Louis Henry, Prince of Nassau-Dillenburg House of Nassau Born: 9 May 1594 Died: 12 July 1662
Preceded by George as Count of Nassau-Dillenburg	Prince of Nassau-Dillenburg before 1654 Count of Nassau-Dillenburg; 1623-1662	Succeeded by Henry
