= George, Count of Nassau-Dillenburg =

Count of Nassau-Dillenburg

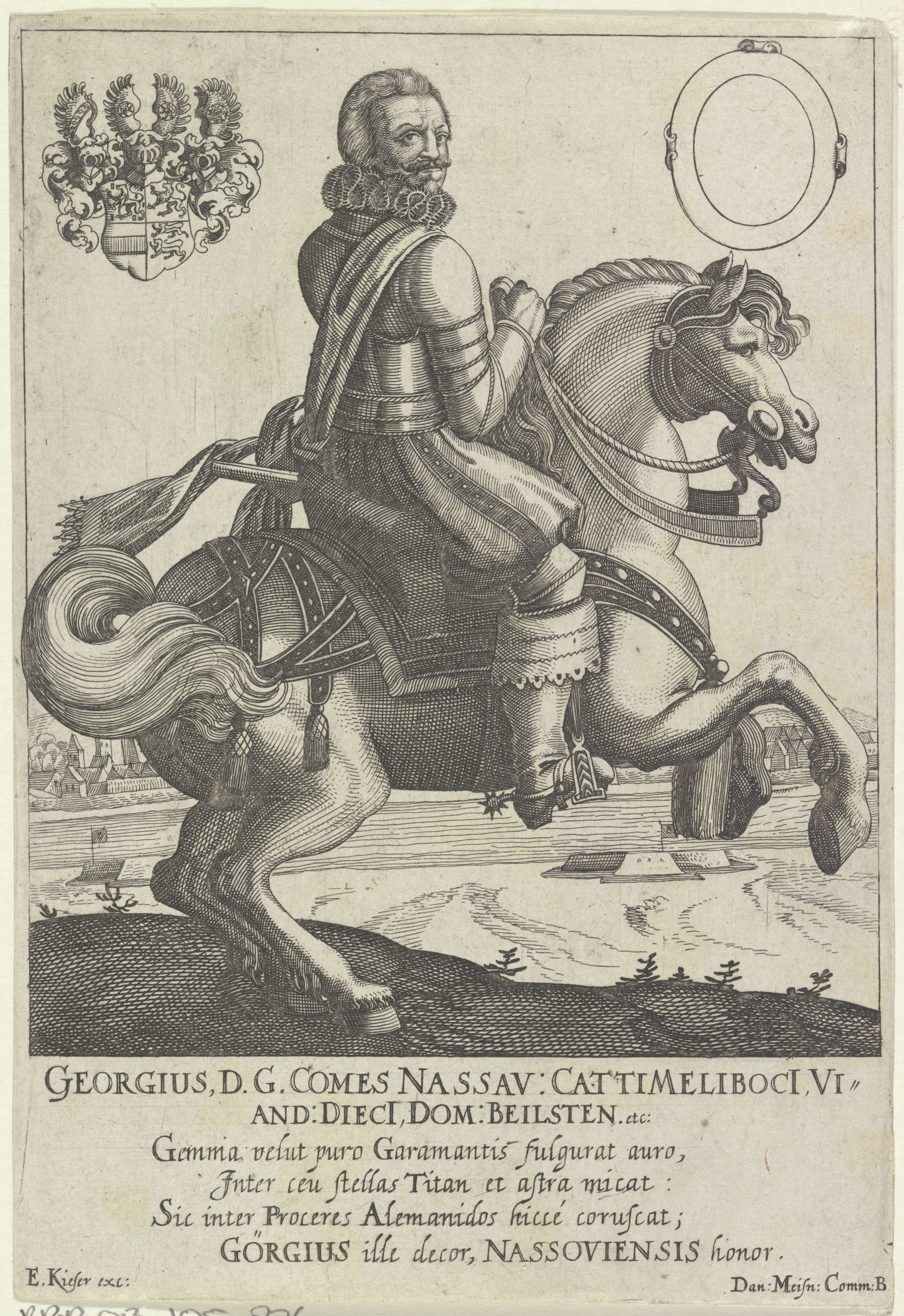
- Born: 1 September 1562
- Died: 9 August 1623 (aged 60); Dillenburg
- Noble family: House of Nassau
- Spouses: Anna Amalia of Nassau-Saarbrücken; Amalia of Sayn-Wittgenstein
- Father: John VI, Count of Nassau-Dillenburg
- Mother: Elisabeth of Leuchtenberg

Count George of Nassau-Beilstein, later also Count of Nassau-Dillenburg, (1 September 1562 – 9 August 1623 in Dillenburg) was the third son of Count John VI "the Elder" of Nassau-Dillenburg (1536–1606) from his first marriage with Landgravine Elisabeth of Leuchtenberg.

In 1576, he studied at the University of Heidelberg. In 1578, he went to the Netherlands, to serve in the army, under Count of Günther XLI of Schwarzburg-Arnstadt. While in the Netherlands, he tried to be elected Bishop of Utrecht, but failed. From 1580, he attended the court of Margrave George Frederick of Brandenburg-Ansbach-Kulmbach.

In 1604, he purchased his first territory, the district and city of Driedorf from his father. After his father died in 1606, George and his brothers decided to divide Nassau-Dillenburg. When this division was implemented in 1607, William Louis received Nassau-Dillenburg; John VII received Nassau-Siegen; Ernst Casimir received Nassau-Diez; John Louis received Nassau-Hadamar and George received Nassau-Beilstein, which included the Lordships of Westerwald, Burbach and Hickengrund. In 1611, he purchased the Nassau share of the district of Wehrheim, which Nassau shared with Trier, from his brother John VII.

Until 1612, George resided in Dillenburg, as regent for his absent brother William Louis, who was in Holland. After his brother returned, George moved into Beilstein Castle, in his own territory.

In 1618, George reached an agreement with his brother John VII, in which John ceded to George the right to inherit Dillenburg if William Louis were to die childless. This came to happen in 1620. So George moved back to Dillenburg and became the founder of the younger Nassau-Dillenburg line. Nassau-Beilstein was divided, with George keeping Burbach and Hickengrund.

He ruled his territory well; like his brothers he issued court regulations, administrative and law enforcement regulations.

George died in Dillenburg in 1623.

== Marriage and issue ==
George married twice. His first wife was Anna Amalia of Nassau-Saarbrücken (1565–1605), the only child of Philip IV of Nassau-Weilburg. They had 15 children:

1. John Philip (b. 1586)
2. Johan George (b. 1587)
3. unnamed son (b. 1588)
4. John Philip (1590–1607)
5. George (1591–1616)
6. Maria Juliana (1592–1645), married Count George II of Sayn-Wittgenstein-Berleburg (1565–1631), son of Louis I, Count of Sayn-Wittgenstein, and thus half-brother of her stepmother
7. Louise (1593–1614)
8. Louis Henry (1594–1662), Count of Nassau-Dillenburg jointly with Albert from 1623 to 1626 and alone from 1626 until his death; raised to Prince in 1654
9. Wolfgang Philip (b. 1595)
10. Albert (1596–1626), ruled Nassau-Dillenburg jointly with Louis Henry from 1623 until his death in 1626
11. Amalia (1597–1598)
12. Elisabeth (1598–1599)
13. Erica (1600–1657)
14. Anna Elisabeth (1602–1651)
15. Maurice Louis (1603–1604)

After her death, George married Countess Amalia of Sayn-Wittgenstein (1585–1633), the daughter of Louis I, Count of Sayn-Wittgenstein. With her, he had one more daughter:

1. Margarethe (1606–1661), married Count Otto of Lippe-Brake (1589–1657), a son of Simon VI of Lippe (1554–1613)

== Ancestors ==
Ancestors of George, Count of Nassau-Dillenburg

16. John IV, Count of Nassau-Siegen
8. John V, Count of Nassau-Siegen
17. Mary of Looz-Heinsberg
4. William I, Count of Nassau-Siegen
18. Henry III, Landgrave of Upper Hesse
9. Elisabeth of Hesse-Marburg
19. Anna of Katzenelnbogen
2. John VI, Count of Nassau-Dillenburg
20. Henry IX of Stolberg
10. Bodo III, Count of Stolberg-Wernigerode
21. Matilda of Mansfeld
5. Juliana of Stolberg
22. Philip I of Eppstein-Königstein
11. Anna of Eppstein-Königstein
23. Louise de la Marck
1. George, Count of Nassau-Dillenburg
24. Frederick V of Leuchtenberg
12. John IV, Landgrave of Leuchtenberg
25. Dorothea of Rieneck
6. George III, Landgrave of Leuchtenberg
26. Günther XXXVIII, Count of Schwarzburg
13. Margaret of Schwarzburg
27. Catherine of Querfurt
3. Countess Elisabeth of Leuchtenberg
28. Albert III, Margrave of Brandenburg
14. Frederick I, Margrave of Brandenburg-Ansbach
29. Anna of Saxony
7. Barbara of Brandenburg-Ansbach-Kulmbach
30. Casimir IV Jagiellon
15. Sophia Jagiellon
31. Elizabeth of Austria

George, Count of Nassau-Dillenburg House of Nassau Born: 1 September 1562 Died: 9 August 1623
Preceded by John VI	Lord of Driedorf; 1604-1607	Succeeded by himself as Count of Nassau-Beilstein
Preceded by John VI	Count of Nassau-Beilstein; 1607-1620	Nassau-Beilstein divided
Preceded by William Louis	Count of Nassau-Dillenburg; 1620-1623	Succeeded by Louis Henry and Albert
