= Hadamar =

- Town
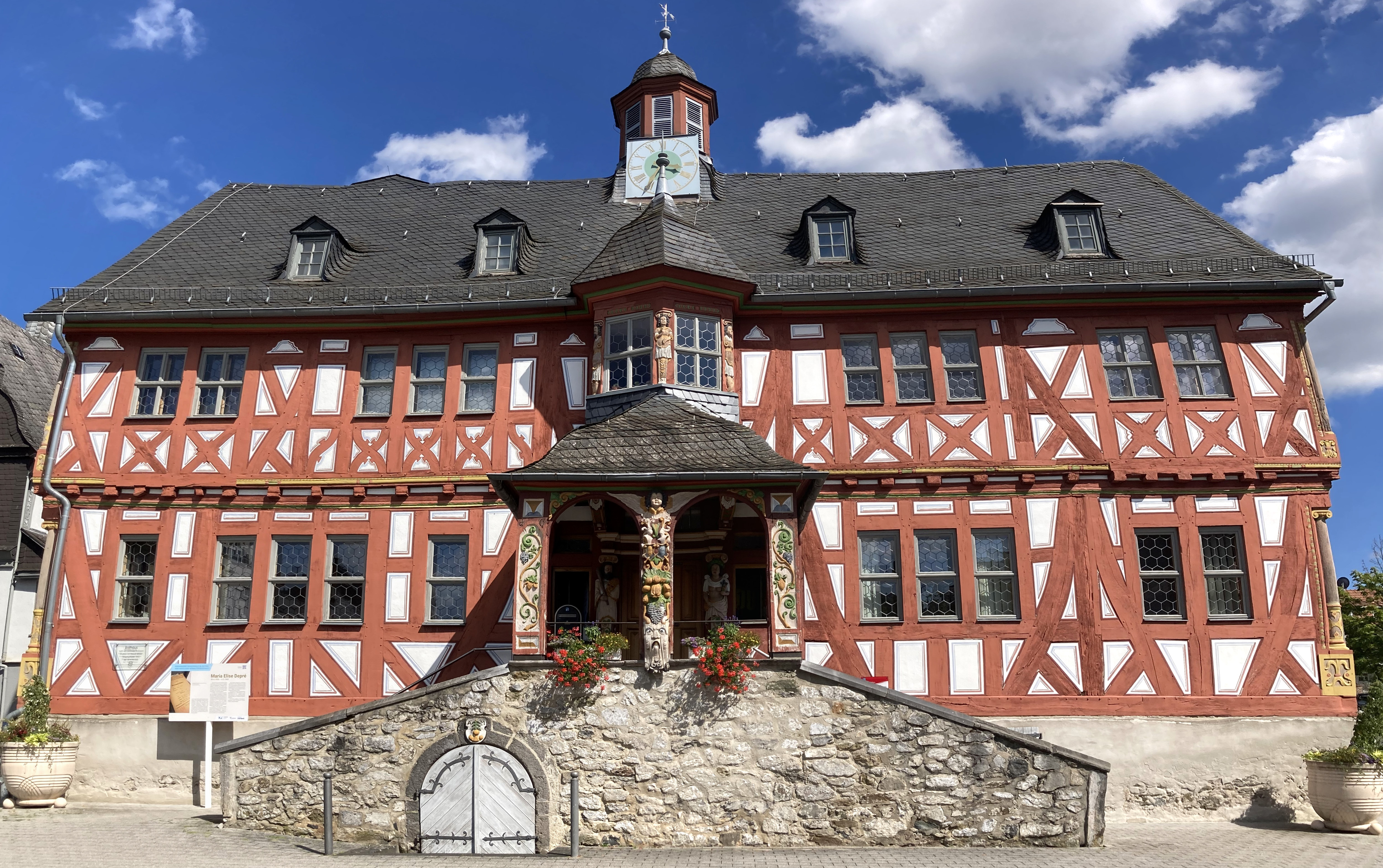
- Hadamar town hall from 1639

- Flag Coat of arms

- Location of Hadamar within Limburg-Weilburg district
- Interactive map of Hadamar
- Location within Germany Location within Hesse
- Coordinates: 50°27′N 8°3′E
- Country: Germany
- State: Hesse
- Admin. region: Gießen
- District: Limburg-Weilburg

Government
  - Mayor (2021–27): Michael Ruoff (CDU)

Area
  - Total: 40.99 km^{2} (15.83 sq mi)
- Elevation: 191 m (627 ft)

Population (2025-12-31)
  - Total: 12,967
  - Density: 316.3/km^{2} (819.3/sq mi)
- Time zone: UTC+01:00 (CET)
  - Summer (DST): UTC+02:00 (CEST)
- Postal codes: 65589
- Dialling codes: 06433
- Vehicle registration: LM, WEL
- Website: www.hadamar.de

Hadamar (German pronunciation: [ˈhaːdamaʁ]) is a small town in Limburg-Weilburg district in Hesse, Germany.

Hadamar is known for its Clinic for Forensic Psychiatry/Centre for Social Psychiatry, lying at the edge of town, in whose outlying buildings is also found the Hadamar Memorial. This remembers the murders of people with handicaps and mental illnesses under the Nazi regime at the NS-Tötungsanstalt Hadamar.

== Geography ==
=== Location ===
Hadamar lies 7 km north of Limburg between Cologne and Frankfurt am Main on the southern edge of the Westerwald at elevations from 120 to 390 m above sea level.

=== Neighbouring communities ===
Hadamar borders in the north on the communities of Dornburg, Elbtal and Waldbrunn, in the east on the community of Beselich, in the south on the town of Limburg, and the community of Elz (all in Limburg-Weilburg) and in the west on the community of Hundsangen (in the Westerwaldkreis in Rhineland-Palatinate).

=== Constituent communities ===
The town consists of eight formerly autonomous communities.

- Hadamar (main town)
- Niederhadamar
- Niederzeuzheim
- Oberzeuzheim
- Steinbach
- Oberweyer
- Niederweyer
- Faulbach

== History ==
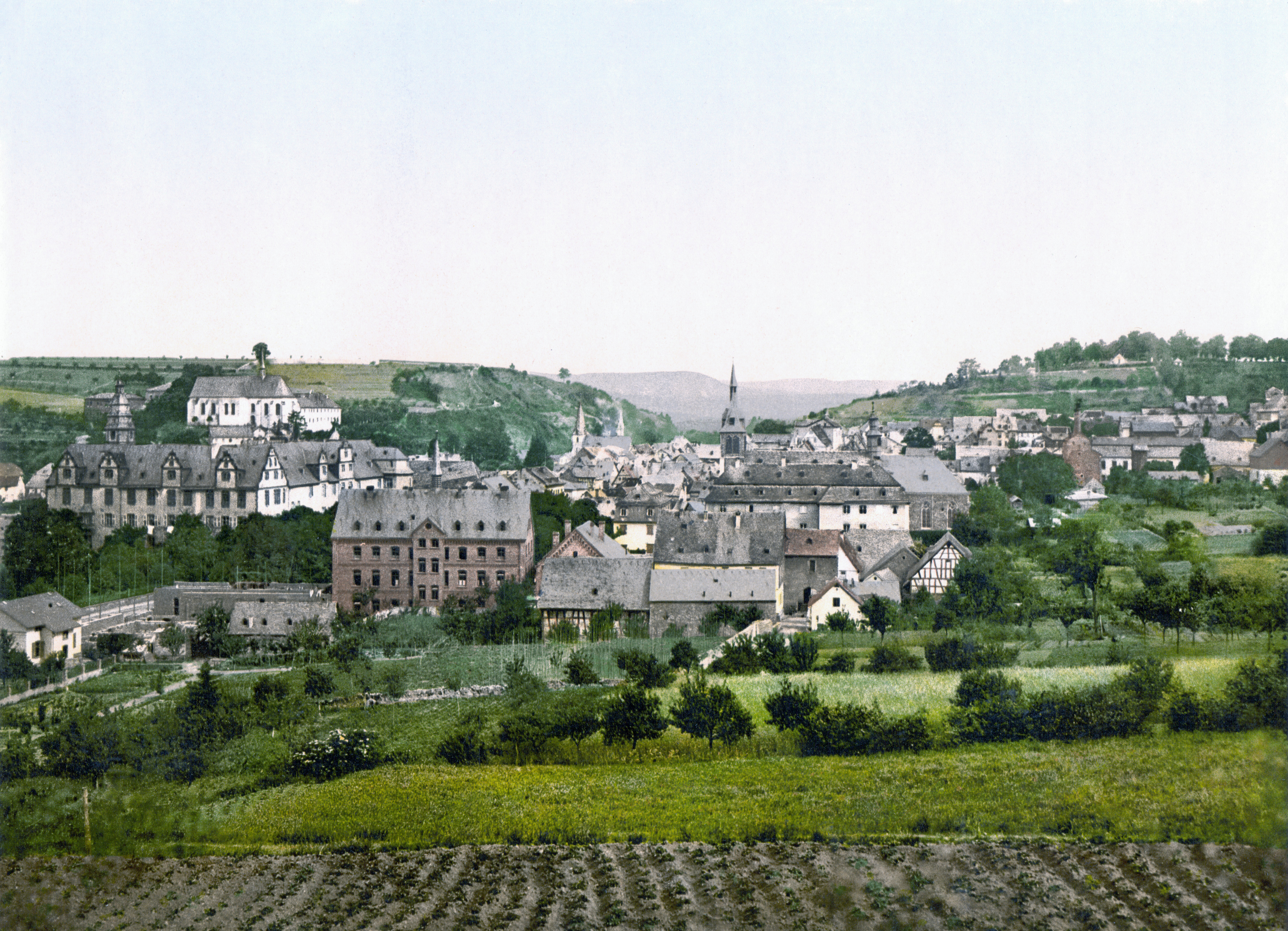
View of Hadamar about 1900

One of the oldest witnesses to the Hadamar region's settlement is the cist (see also Megaliths) stemming from the Wartberg culture, and therefore some 5,000 years old, in Hadamar-Niederzeuzheim. A further grave was found in Oberzeuzheim, but it was taken apart and reassembled in the castle garden at Hachenburg (Westerwaldkreis).

Out of all today's constituent communities, Oberweyer and Niederweyer were the first to be mentioned in documents, in 772. The town's name itself did not have its first documentary mention until 832 in a Carolingian exchange document. On the spot where now stands the Renaissance palace on the banks of the Elbbach, Cistercian monks from Eberbach Abbey in the Rheingau worked a model farm in the 13th century which Count Emich von Nassau-Hadamar bought in 1320 and converted into a moated castle. In 1324, Emperor Ludwig IV granted him Frankfurt town rights for his residence. A yearly fair is known to have existed in 1430.

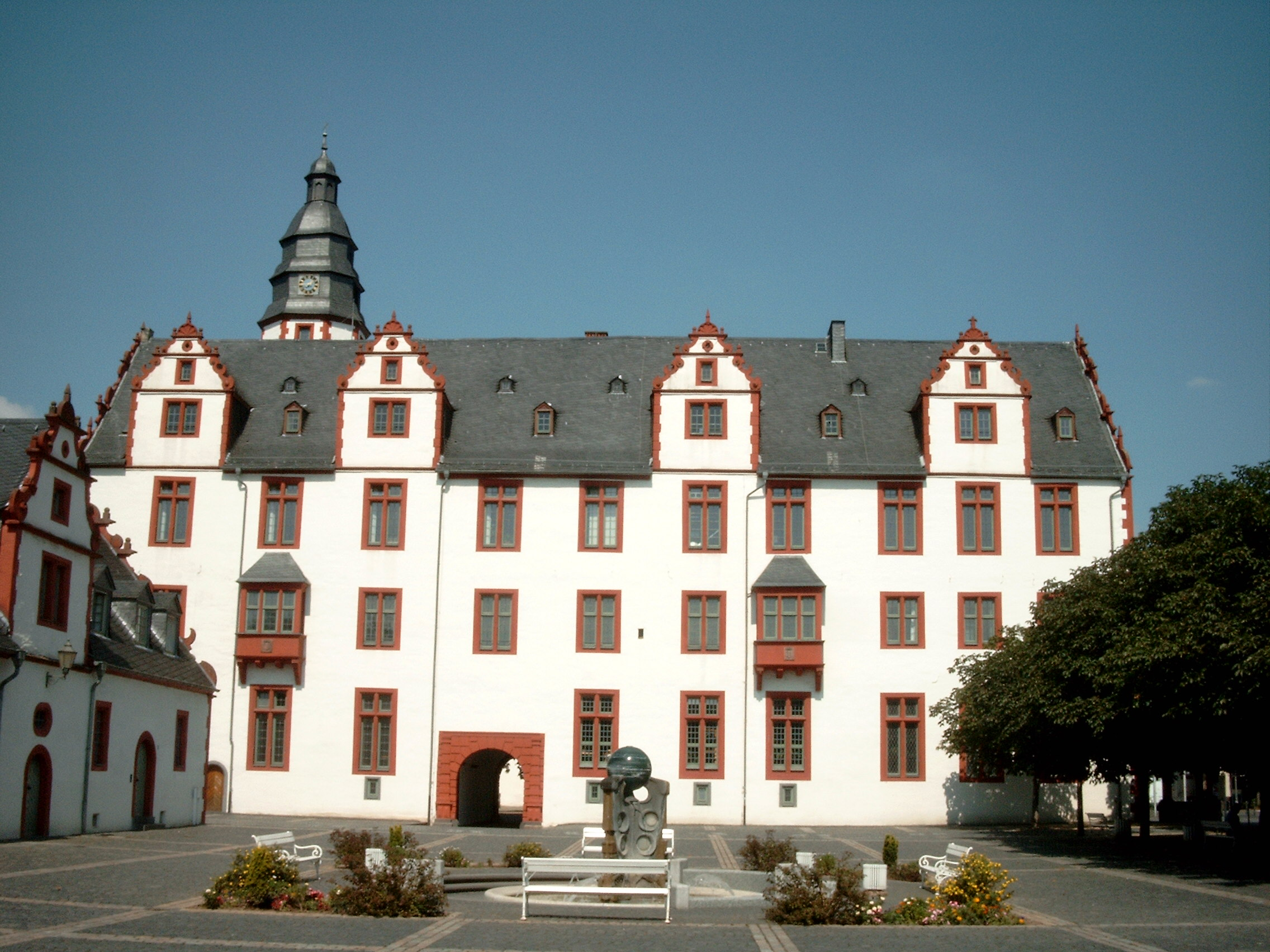
Hadamar Schloss (Hadamar palace)

After a devastating fire in the 16th century, there were great changes to the town's appearance in the 17th century. The town had Count, later Prince, Johann Ludwig von Nassau-Hadamar (1590–1653) to thank for the new building work. He had the old moated castle expanded as his residence into a Renaissance palace, and he laid out the Baroque new town's streets in a grid pattern with broad marketplaces and public fountains. The Prince called the Franciscans to town, supported the building of the monastery with endowments and saw to the establishment of the Society of Jesus in Hadamar in 1630.

Johann Ludwig von Nassau-Hadamar managed to bring his lordly domain some importance when the Emperor named him Commissioner-General of the negotiations surrounding the Peace of Westphalia, which eventually put an end to the Thirty Years' War. He was the first to sign the document for the peace treaty. In 1650, he was made Prince, whereby Hadamar became a residence town. After several conversions, Johann Ludwig became Catholic again in 1629 and arranged for Jesuits to live in Hadamar who instituted a Gymnasium in 1652. Prince Johann Ludwig is the namesake of the comprehensive school that has grown out of this Jesuit Gymnasium, and which still exists today in Hadamar.

"Hadamar Baroque" earned importance in the field of altar building art. The terms "Hadamar Baroque" and "Hadamar school" (Hadamarer Barock and Hadamarer Schule in German) are indeed quite commonly used in the area of the former Principality of Nassau-Hadamar, though how it arose and spread, along with its meaning and connections to art history are largely unknown. Archival finds about 70 to 80 years ago yielded isolated clues. New findings are to a significant extent especially Ludwig Baron Döry's work through his publications since the 1970s. The four sculptors who were among the best of the "Hadamar school" were Martin Volk, Johann Valentin Neudecker the Elder, Johann Neudecker the Younger and Johann Theodor Thüringer. Not long ago, streets in the main town were named after them.

The Corrigendenanstalt, the forerunner of today's Centre for Social Psychiatry, was built in 1883 beside the former Franciscan monastery on the Mönchberg. The architect was Building Councillor (Baurat) Eduard Zais, who clearly laid the new facility out using one of his earlier works, the Klinik für Psychiatrie und Psychotherapie Eichberg, designed about 30 years earlier, as a model. The institution served as a workhouse for interning and reeducating vagrants in the Regierungsbezirk of Wiesbaden and had 236 places for men and 80 for women. In the neighbouring former monastery at the same time, an institution for rural paupers (Landarme) from Hadamar and the outlying countryside was founded that was less strictly run and seldom had more than a dozen inmates. In 1906, the Corrigendenanstalt was converted into a care facility for the mentally ill.

In Nazi Germany, beginning in 1941 at the NS-Tötungsanstalt Hadamar as it is nowadays called in German (literally: "Hadamar Nazi Killing Facility"), the then state health and care facility on the Mönchberg, at least 14,494 handicapped or mentally ill people, along with those known as "Half-Jews" under the Nuremberg Laws and Ostarbeiter ("Eastern workers") were murdered. Today a memorial recalls these crimes. On the grounds today stands the Clinic for Forensic Psychiatry. Most of Hadamar's Jews were murdered in camps that were farther away. In 1942 alone, 19 Jewish inhabitants were taken away and murdered.

After the Second World War, German-speaking refugee families from the Sudetenland came to live here. They brought with them their glass crafts and founded businesses, which in turn led to the founding of the now Germany-wide famous Erwin-Stein-Glasfachschule, a vocational school in which glass craftsmen and -women, and also stained glass makers from all over Germany are trained. The school enjoys an outstanding reputation far beyond Germany's borders. There are plans to open a glass museum in the renovated princely dwelling at the Hadamar palace.

In Hadamar is also found the "Musical Boarding School", since 1969 the rehearsal seat of the Limburger Domsingknaben and since 1998 of the department of church music of the Bishopric of Limburg.

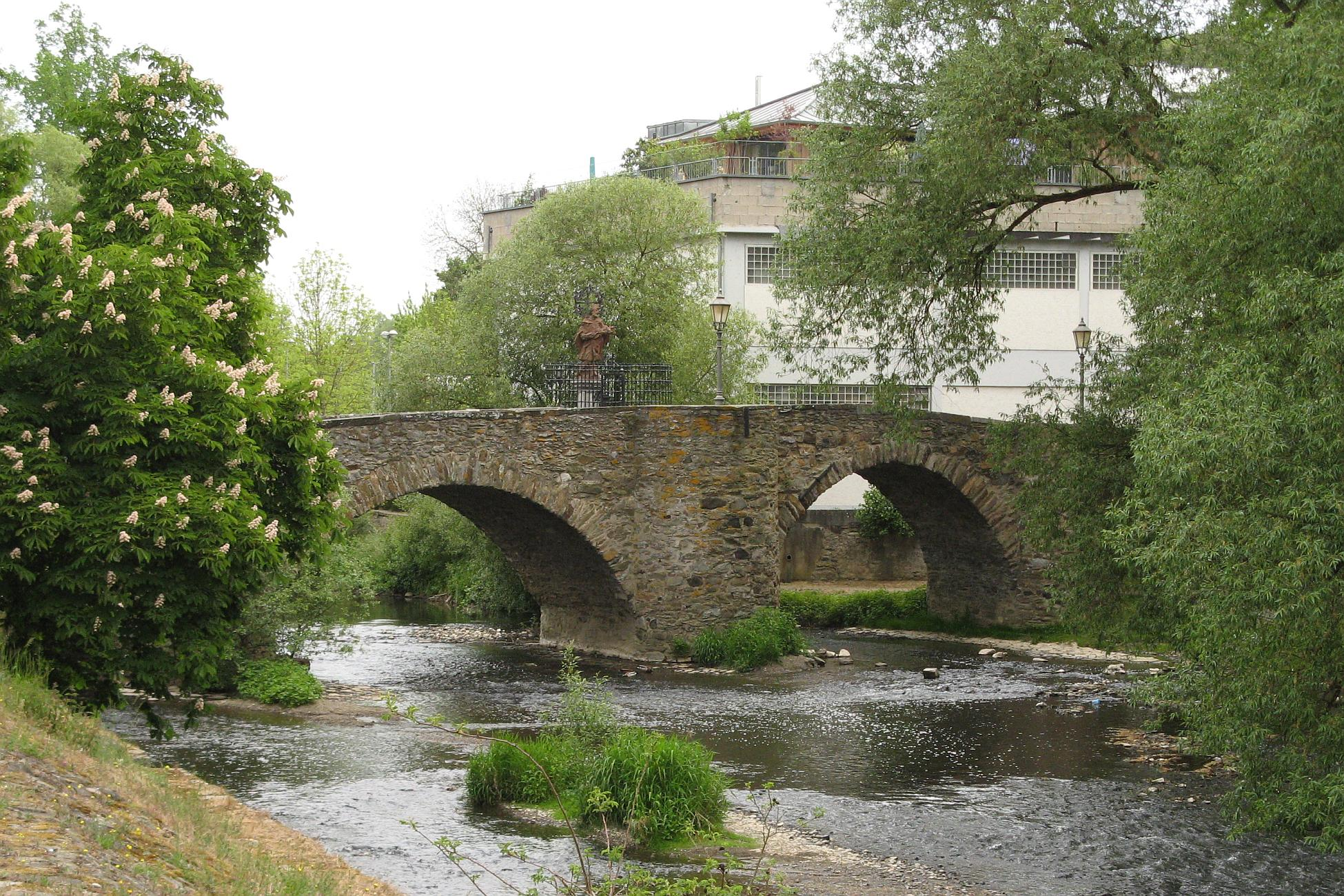
Stone bridge in Hadamar

Throughout the town, one comes across witnesses to the past. Among these are the Fürstenschloss (princely residence) with its old stone bridge, the Liebfrauenkirche (church) with a bell from the time of the Thirty Years' War, the Stadtkirche ("Town Church") with the old Franciscan friary, the former Jesuit house on the Mönchberg, the renovated "Old Town Hall", the synagogue, the historic marketplaces, and some old timber-frame houses. In many ways it can still be clearly seen that the town was a princely seat, a court seat, administrative seat and a market town for centuries for a broad outlying area.

== Politics ==
The municipal election held on 14 March 2021 yielded the following results:

| Parties and voter communities | | % 2016 | seats 2016 | % 2021 | seats 2021 |
| CDU | Christian Democratic Union of Germany | 40.7 | 15 | 31.5 | 12 |
| Greens | Alliance 90/The Greens | - | - | 15.5 | 6 |
| SPD | Social Democratic Party of Germany | 20.5 | 8 | 14.3 | 5 |
| FWG | Freie Wählergemeinschaft Hadamar | 22.5 | 8 | 20.5 | 7 |
| WfH | Wir für Hadamar | 16.3 | 6 | 18.2 | 7 |
| Total | | 100.0 | 37 | 100.0 | 37 |
| voter turnout in % | | 44.9 | | 47.6 | |

== Coat of arms ==
Hadamar's arms have their roots in a seal image that was already being used in the town of Hadamar and in the outlying countryside by the late 15th century. The crosses in the arms stand for peace and the crossed swords for might.

== Main sights ==
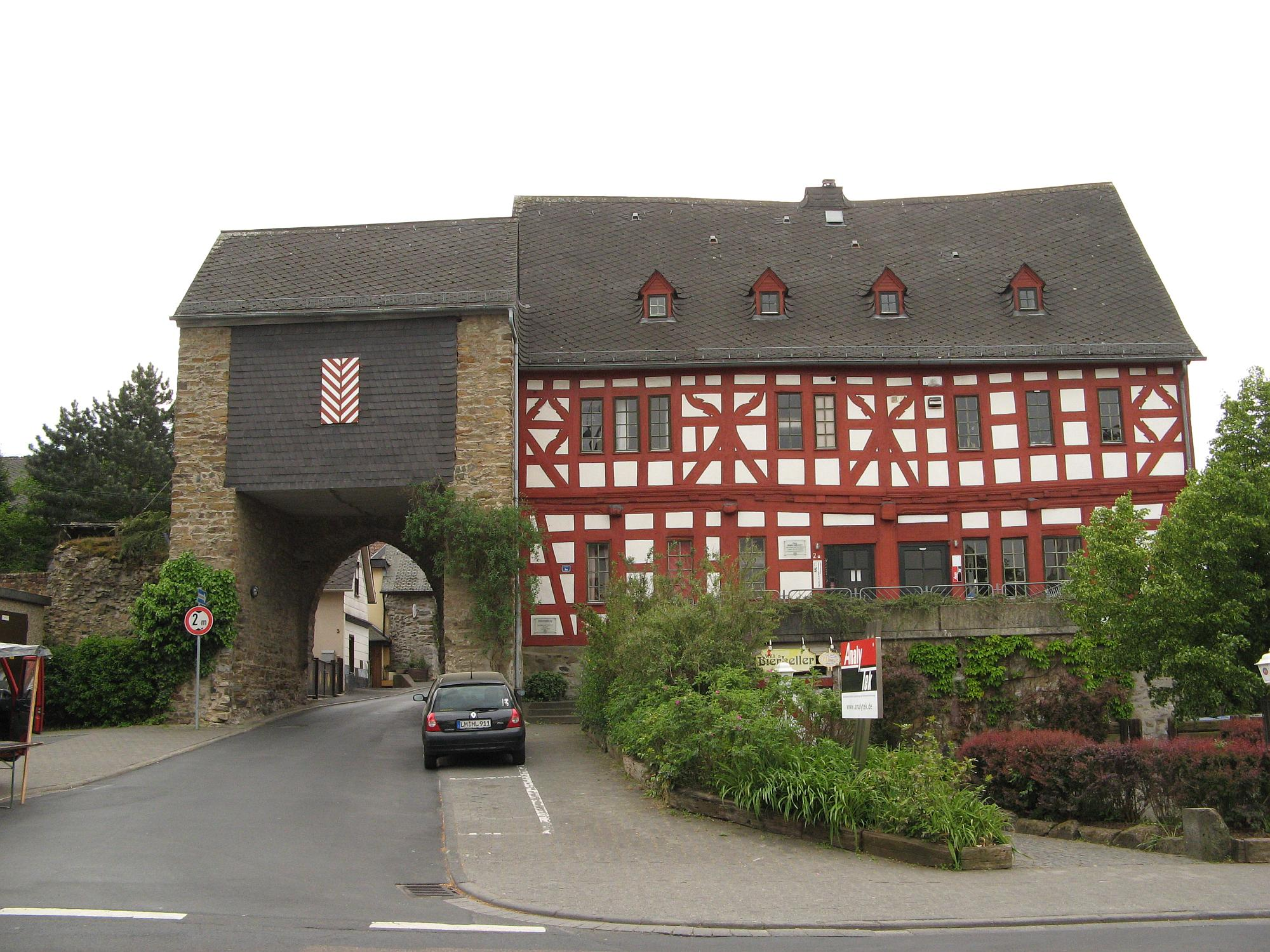
The town wall's Limburg Gate

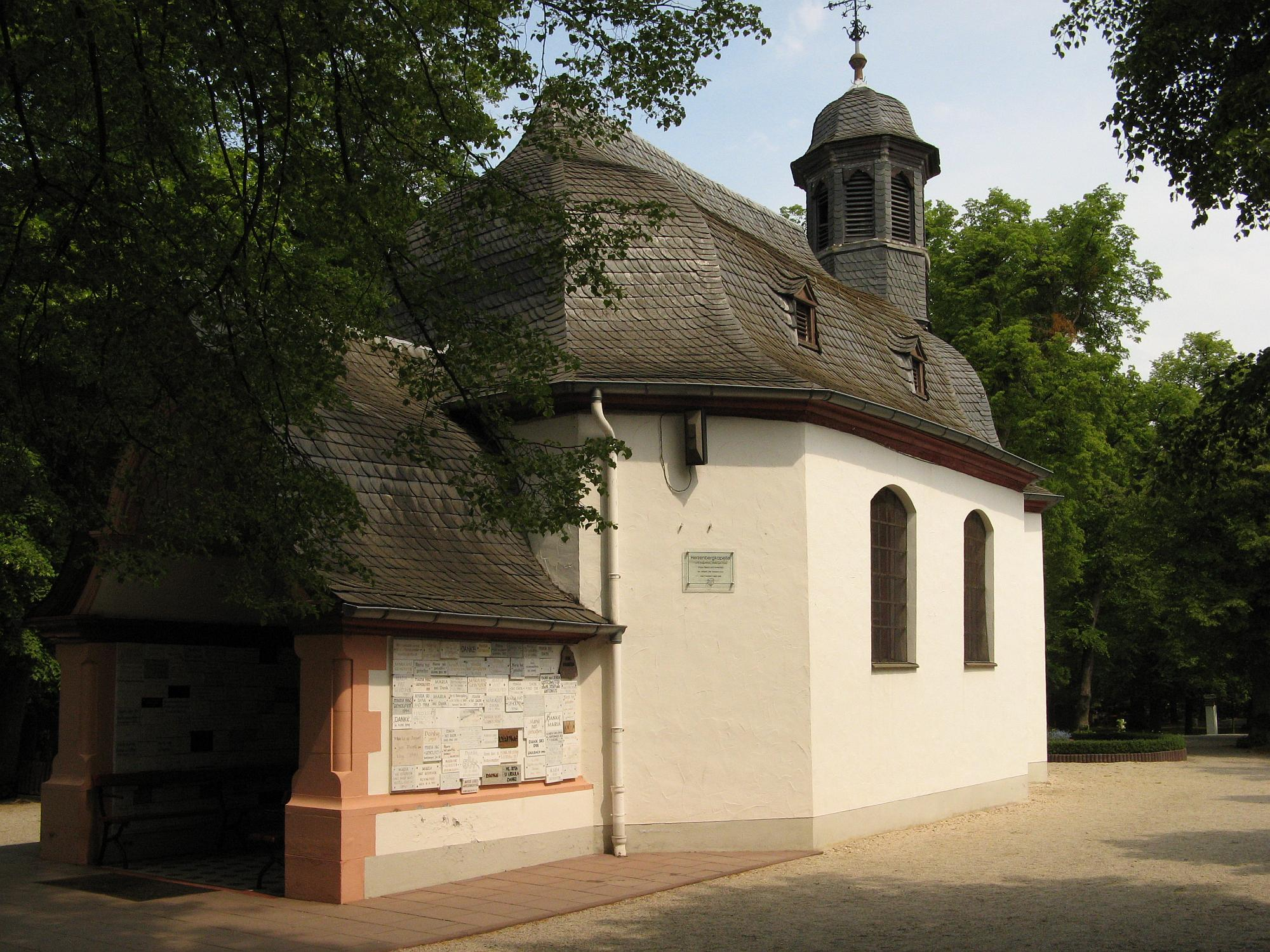
Herzenbergkapelle

In the Old Town (Altstadt), many timber-frame buildings have been preserved, among them the Town Hall (Rathaus) built in 1639 and the Jesuit boarding school (early 17th century) at the Limburg Gate (Limburger Pforte). That is why Hadamar is located on the German Timber-Frame Road.

The Gothic Liebfrauenkirche on the Elbbach was built before 1376 and until 1818 served as the town church. The bell that rings in the churchtower comes from the time of the Thirty Years' War, making it one of Germany's oldest bells still in use. The Baroque Church of St. Johannes Nepomuk, currently serving as the town church, is part of the Jesuit residence (built 1756-1758). The Ägidienkirche (“Saint Giles’s Church”) on the Mönchberg was part of the Franciscan monastery from 1632 to 1816. 31 members of the House of Nassau-Hadamar are buried here. Above the Old Town is the Baroque Herzenbergkapelle (a chapel built about 1676) in which the Hadamar Princes’ hearts are buried. All the churches are decorated in the “Hadamar Baroque” style.

The synagogue is likewise preserved. Today, the building houses a permanent exhibit about Jewish life.

At the edge of the Old Town, right on the Elbbach stands the former Nassau residence, Schloss Hadamar, in whose stable is housed the town museum. Within the town, two old bridges have also been preserved, the Steinerne Brücke (“Stone Bridge”) and the St. Wendelinbrücke.

At the Herzenbergkapelle, a rose garden has been laid out. In an area of some 3,000m^{2}, roughly 2,000 rose plants of over 160 varieties have been planted.

== Transport ==
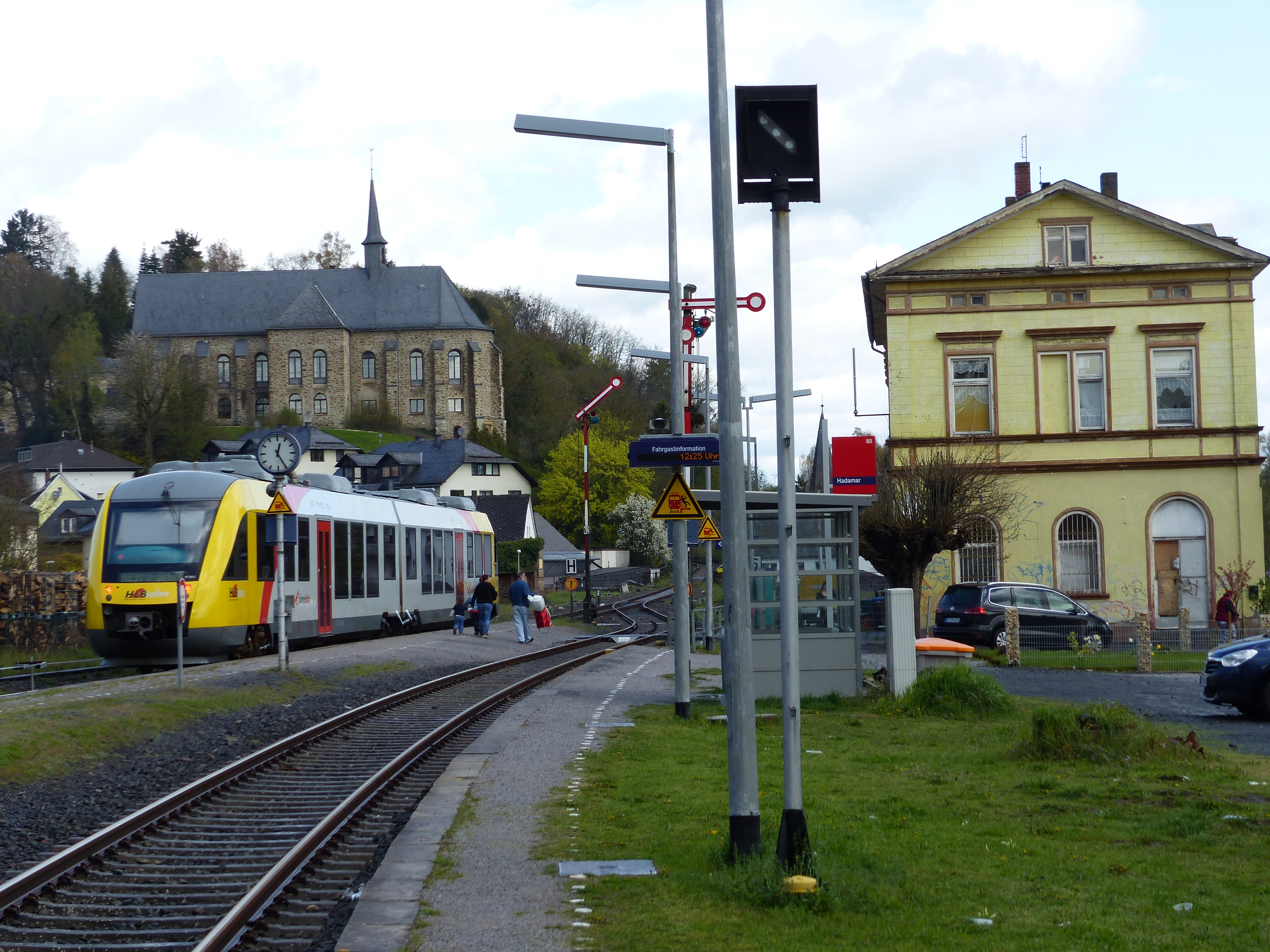
Hadamar train station

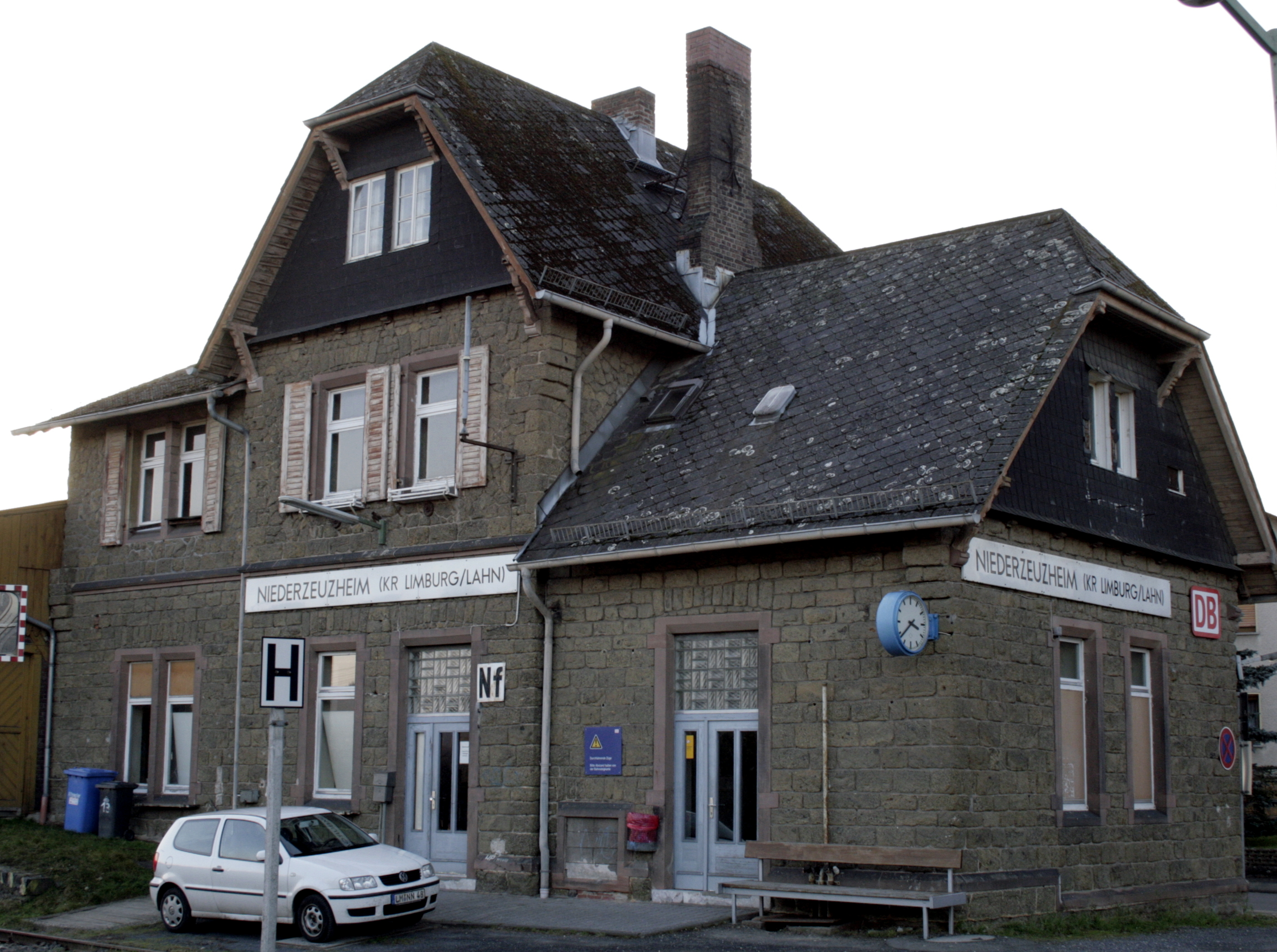
Niederzeuzheim station

The town of Hadamar lies on Bundesstraße 54 from Siegen to Limburg.

Hadamar has three stations on the Westerwald-Sieg-Bahn from Limburg via Willmenrod has a stop at the Westerwald-Sieg-Railwayrailway, which is served by the local trains of the line RB90 (Limburg (Lahn) - Diez Ost - Westerburg - Hachenburg, Altenkirchen, Au (Sieg), Wissen and Kirchen to Siegen Hbf, served by Hessische Landesbahn section DreiLänderBahn, these are Hadamar, Niederzeuzheim and Niederhadamar. From there, the cities of Cologne, Koblenz, Frankfurt am Main and Wiesbaden may be reached directly. Niederzeuzheim station has a park and ride lot as for public transport users as well. Hadamar is located in the zone number 6040 of the transport association Rhein-Main-Verkehrsverbund RMV and the zone number 172 of the transport association Verkehrsverbund Rhein-Mosel (VRM).

== Education ==
There are five primary schools in town, one each in Hadamar, Niederhadamar, Niederzeuzheim, Oberzeuzheim and Steinbach.

Secondary school education is to be had at the Fürst-Johann-Ludwig-Schule, a comprehensive school with Hauptschule, Realschule and Gymnasium branches. The school's feeder area reaches far beyond the town's limits.

Moreover, Hadamar is a centre for glazier training. The Federal vocational school of the glazier's craft and the Erwin-Stein-Schule (state glass vocational school) are located here. The Erwin-Stein-Schule is named after Erwin Stein, one of the fathers of the Hessian state constitution.

Hadamar is seat of the “Musical Boarding School”, where the Limburger Domsingknaben are trained.

== People ==
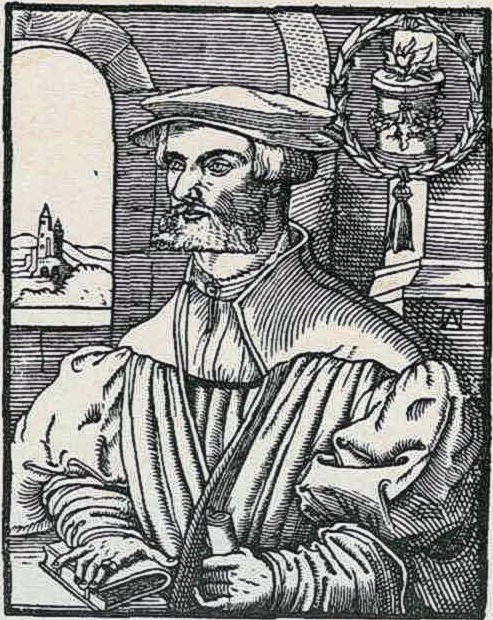
Christian Egenolff

- Johann Wilhelm Bausch (1774-1840) 1834-1840 Bishop of Limburg
- Karl Wilhelm Diefenbach (1851–1913), painter
- Christian Egenolff (1502–1555), Frankfurt's first independent book printer
- Ernst Moritz Engert (1892–1986), silhouette artist and painter
- Karl Faust (1874–1952), German botanist
- Maria Mathi (1889–1961), writer
- Peter Melander von Holzappel (1589–1648), commander in the Thirty Years' War
- Prince Johann Ludwig von Nassau-Hadamar (1590–1653), regent, Imperial commissioner and signer of the peace agreement for the Peace of Westphalia
- Gustav Ricker (1870–1948), physician and scientist
- André Rudersdorf (b.1995), racing driver

== See also ==
- Hadamar Euthanasia Centre
