= Louis I of Sayn-Wittgenstein =

Louis I
- Count of Sayn-Wittgenstein
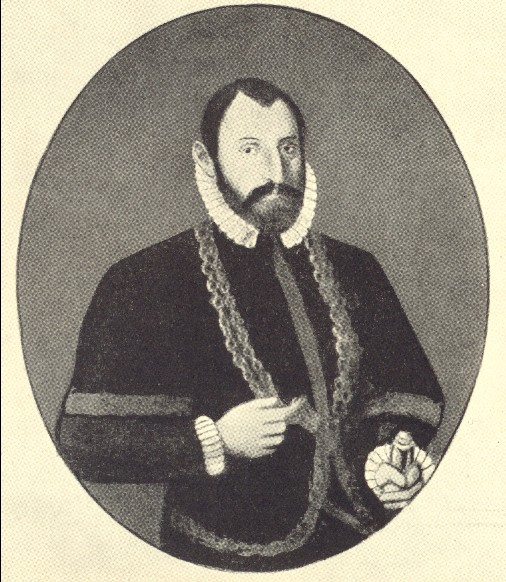
- Born: 7 December 1532; Wittgenstein Castle, near Bad Laasphe
- Died: 2 July 1605 (aged 72); On the road near Altenkirchen
- Noble family: House of Sayn-Wittgenstein
- Spouses: Anna of Solms-Braunfels; Elisabeth of Solms-Laubach
- Father: William I, Count of Sayn-Wittgenstein
- Mother: Johannetta of Isenburg-Neumagen

Louis I, Count of Sayn-Wittgenstein, nicknamed "the Elder", formally "Louis I of Sayn, Count at Wittgenstein" (7 December 1532 at Wittgenstein Castle, near Bad Laasphe – 2 July 1605, while travelling near Altenkirchen) ruled the County of Wittgenstein, on the upper reaches of the rivers Lahn and Eder, from 1558 until his death. He converted his county to Calvinism and was an influential politician in the service to the Electoral Palatinate.

== Biography ==
He was born as the sixth child and fourth son of William I, Count of Sayn-Wittgenstein (24 August 1488 – 18 April 1570) and his wife, Countess Johannetta of Isenburg-Neumagen (born 1500).

He received his first schooling at Wittgenstein Castle from the vicar of Weidenhausen. In 1543, Louis and his brothers went to Cologne to receive further education. He learned Greek and Latin, as well as English, French, Italian, and some Spanish. From 1545, Louis and two of his brothers studied at the Universities of Leuven, Paris and Orléans. Between 1553 and 1556, he made a Grand Tour, visiting Padua, Malta, Savoy, France and England. he briefly served Pope Pius IV as treasurer. When he returned to Wittgenstein Castle in 1556, Louis found that his father had issued a moderate Lutheran Church Order (Lutheran). He studied the new faith and converted to Lutheranism.

His elderly father William I (died 18 April 1570) had appointed Louis' elder brother William II as Regent in 1551. In 1558, William II died in Brussels and Louis I took up the regency.

Count Louis was raised in a humanist fashion. He frequently corresponded with his contemporaries, especially with other Calvinists. He travelled to the Netherlands and visited the grave of Erasmus. He began an intensive correspondence with various scholars of his time. As a result of this correspondence, he increasingly turned to the Reformed doctrine. In 1568, he travelled to Zurich, where he met numerous leading Reformed, with whom he also started an intense correspondence.

Between 1574 and 1577, he served as Lord High Stewart at the Reformed court of Elector Palatine Frederick III in Heidelberg. During this period, he carried out numerous political tasks. In Heidelberg, he also came into close contact with Reformed theologicians and scholars. After the Palatinate reverted to Lutheranism under Elector Louis VI, his service in Heidelberg ended.

Louis returned to his county and brought the reformer Caspar Olevian with him. Reformed church orders had been issued in 1563 and 1565; in 1578, the conversion to the Reformed faith was made official and altars and religious imagery were banned.

Louis of Wittgenstein was a very close friend of his neighbour, Count John VI, Count of Nassau-Dillenburg, who was also reformed, and was almost the same age. In 1584, the two counts jointly founded Herborn Academy. From 1592 to 1594, he again served as Lord High Steward in the Electoral Palatinate, after the Palatinate had again converted to Calvinism.

Louise and his first wife Anna moved their residence from the ancestral Wittgenstein Castle on a hilltop overlooking Bad Laasphe to a former hunting lodge near Berleburg. Here he began keeping a diary.

Parts of his extensive diaries have preserved in the Princely Archive in Berleburg. Some excerpts were printed in the 19th century. His diaries are an important source of information about the intellectual and political history of his time. His extensive correspondence has not yet been fully evaluated by historians.

== Family and children ==
On 14 August 1559, at Dillenburg Castle, he married Countess Anna of Solms-Braunfels (1538–1565), daughter of Philipp I, Count of Solms-Braunfels (1494–1581) and his wife, Countess Anna of Tecklenburg (1500–1554). Anna died in 1565. Children of his first marriage were:

- Johannette (15 February 1561 – 13 April 1622), married Johann VI, Count of Nassau-Dillenburg; she was his third wife.
- Juliana (18 September 1562 – 13 January 1563).
- George II (30 April 1565 – 16 December 1631), inherited Sayn-Wittgenstein-Berleburg, married Countess Elisabeth of Nassau-Weilburg (with whom he had issue, Christian Louis Casimir of Sayn-Wittgenstein-Ludwigsburg being among his descendants) and secondly Countess Maria Anna Juliana of Nassau-Dillenburg, daughter of George, Count of Nassau-Dillenburg.

In 1567, Louis remarried, to Countess Elisabeth of Solms-Laubach (6 March 1549 – 1599), daughter of Frederick Magnus I, Count of Solms-Laubach and his wife, Countess Agnes von Wied (d. 1588), widow of Count Kaspar von Mansfeld-Hinterort (d. 1542). Children from his second marriage were:

- Agnes (18 April 1568 – 18 April 1617), married John Albert I, Count of Solms-Braunfels (1563–1603), and had issue, including Amalia of Solms-Braunfels.
- William III (14 March 1569 – 29 October 1623), inherited Sayn-Wittgenstein-Hachenburg, married Countess Anna Elisabeth of Sayn-Sayn (1572–1608), and secondly Countess Anna Ottilie of Nassau-Weilburg (1582–1635).
- Anna (11 February 1570 – 9 July 1571).
- Louis II (15 March 1571 – 14 September 1634), inherited Sayn-Wittgenstein-Wittgenstein, married Countess Juliana of Solms-Braunfels (1578–1634).
- Conrad (5 May 1572 – 20 March 1573).
- Frederick Magnus (15 – 18 August 1574).
- Magdalena (28 October 1575 – 6 February 1634), married Baron Wilhelm of Winneburg und Beilstein (1571–1637).
- Eberhard (born and died 6 November 1576).
- Anna Elisabeth (8 December 1577 – 18 December 1580).
- Philipp (8 March 1579 – 10 November 1580).
- Erika (31 May 1580 – 30 August 1657).
- Elisabeth (25 August 1581 – ca. 1600), married Maximilian Marschall of Pappenheim, Landgrave of Stühlingen (1580–1639).
- Juliane (26 February 1583 – 8 February 1627), married Wolfgang Ernest I, Count of Isenburg-Büdingen-Birstein.
- Gebhard (20 March 1584 – 22 August 1602).
- Amalie (13 October 1585 – 28 March 1633), married George, Count of Nassau-Dillenburg.
- Bernhard (17 November 1587 – 14 March 1616).
- Katharina (10 August 1588 – 19 May 1651), married Louis Henry, Prince of Nassau-Dillenburg.
