= Adolf I of Nassau-Siegen =

German count (1362–1420)

Adolf I, Count of Nassau-Siegen

Count of Diez; Count of Nassau-Siegen; Count of Vianden
- Coat of arms
- Reign: 1384–1420 (Diez); 1416–1420 (Nassau-Siegen); 1417–1420 (Vianden)
- Predecessor: Gerhard VII (Diez); John I (Nassau-Siegen); Elisabeth of Sponheim-Kreuznach (Vianden)
- Successor: Godfrey VII of Eppstein-Münzenberg (half Diez); John II with the Helmet (Nassau-Siegen, Vianden and half Diez); Engelbert I (Nassau-Siegen, Vianden and half Diez); John III the Younger (Nassau-Siegen, Vianden and half Diez)
- Full name: Adolf I, Count of Nassau-Siegen
- Native name: Adolf I. Graf von Nassau-Siegen
- Born: 1362
- Died: 12 June 1420
- Noble family: House of Nassau-Siegen
- Spouses: Jutta of Diez; Kunigonda of Isenburg-Limburg
- Issue Detail: Jutta
- Father: John I of Nassau-Siegen
- Mother: Margaret of the Mark

Count Adolf I of Nassau-Siegen (Note: In many sources he is called Adolf I of Nassau(-Dillenburg). His official title was Count of Nassau, but it is incorrect to refer to him as the only reigning Count of Nassau, because the County of Nassau was divided into Nassau-Beilstein, Nassau-Siegen, Nassau-Weilburg and Nassau-Wiesbaden-Idstein. Adolf co-ruled the County of Nassau-Siegen, which is erroneously called Nassau-Dillenburg in many sources. See note 2.) (1362 – 12 June 1420), German: Adolf I. Graf von Nassau-Siegen, was since 1384 Count of Diez, through his first marriage. With his brothers, he succeeded his father in 1416 as Count of Nassau-Siegen (Note: The County of Nassau-Siegen is erroneously called Nassau-Dillenburg in many sources. The county was not named after the small, unimportant city of Dillenburg, which did not even have a church at that time, but after the, for that time, large city of Siegen, the economic centre of the county and the counts' main residence. See Lück (1981), passim. It is also evident from the numbering of the reigning counts with the given name John. One John without regal number who ruled the County of Nassau-Dillenburg in the period 1303–1328, and eight counts by the name of John who ruled the County of Nassau-Siegen in the period 1362–1638.) (a part of the County of Nassau), and also inherited the County of Vianden in 1417. He descended from the Ottonian Line of the House of Nassau.

== Biography ==
Adolf was born in 1362 (Note: von Stramberg (1865), p. 723 states born around 1360.) as the eldest son of Count John I of Nassau-Siegen and Countess Margaret of the Mark.

On 30 November 1376, a marriage contract was concluded between Adolf's father and Count Gerhard VII of Diez, for a marriage of the latter's only daughter Jutta to Adolf. The family of the counts of Diez was on the verge of becoming extinct in the male line; the County of Diez would then pass to Jutta, who was at most eight years old. According to this contract, Adolf would immediately receive everything that was or would become due to his father from the inheritance of Nassau-Hadamar. In addition, Adolf was to receive the dowers belonging to his grandmother Adelaide of Vianden (the Herbermark and the parish of Haiger), as well as half of castle, city and district of Löhnberg, but only until he came into full possession of the Nassau-Hadamar inheritance. The marriage contract further stipulated that the Zents of Nentershausen, Meudt, Salz, Hundsangen, and two others, transferred by Gerhard, Dehrn Castle and the district of Kirberg were to be redeemed by John and given to his daughter-in-law as a dower. The dowry was set at 7,000 guilders and assigned to Dehrn, the six Zents, Laurenburg, the Esterau and the Zents of Diez in the parish of Driedorf. If Gerhard were to die without leaving any sons, his daughter's marriage to Adolf would be consummated immediately and the entire County of Diez would pass to him.

Adolf came into possession of the County of Diez through his marriage to Jutta before 1384. Roman King Wenceslaus invested him with the county in 1384. The beginning of his reign was very unsettled: it fell at the time of a great devastating feud, which was led by the cities of the Rhenish Confederation and their allies, especially Count Rupert the Bellicose of Nassau-Sonnenberg, against the nobility on the Rhine and in the Wetterau and their allies, to whom Adolf's father-in-law Gerhard belonged, under the name of the Hattsteinischen Krieg (Hattstein War). A claim by Adolf to the city of Frankfurt around 1393 for compensation for damages shows that the Frankfurters and Rupert in particular had caused great devastation in the County of Weilnau and had burned several villages in the County of Diez itself. This was probably the reason why Adolf lived in constant hostilities with Frankfurt until 1412, as proven by several letters of refusal still in existence. That this very feud was the cause of the alliance which Adolf established with Archbishop Werner of Trier on 8 November 1388 and for which he had the latter pay him 2,000 guilders, is probable, because Adolf, from the relatives of the House of Nassau, against whom this alliance was not supposed to be directed, explicitly excluded Rupert.

As Count of Diez, Adolf build Ardeck Castle in 1394. The castle primarily served to secure Nassau-Diez territory against the counts of Katzenelnbogen (in particular Burgschwalbach).

With his brothers John II with the Helmet, Engelbert I and John III the Younger, Adolf already agreed on a joint continuation of the government of the County of Nassau-Siegen, when their father would die, on 21 December 1409. Whichever of the brothers would be native or closest to his lands on the father's death should take possession of them in all brothers' name until a division would have taken place. Likewise, they promised each other, out of conviction of mutual advantages, not to inflict any violent advances on each other, and to allow the preferences of one and the other to apply, which had been established by older decrees. Whoever would take something for himself alone would be disinherited. All parental decrees favouring one brother over the other were declared null and void in advance. Adolf hereby tacitly renounced his right to the part of Nassau-Hadamar and the districts of Herborn, Haiger and Löhnberg, which he could have claimed in advance from the marriage contract with the heiress of the County of Diez. In accordance with this agreement, the brothers took over the government jointly after their father's death in 1416. (Note: Dek (1970), p. 66 and Vorsterman van Oyen (1882), p. 90 state that Adolf co-ruled with his brother John II only.) However, the intended division did not take place: Adolf had no male offspring, the elder John was not married, the younger of the same name was a clergyman; it was to be expected that a division would not last long. Together, the brothers bought back the other half of the city of Siegen from the Electorate of Cologne. (Note: Lück (1981), p. 23 states that their father exchanged the County of Arnsberg in 1381 for the other half of Siegen from the Electorate of Cologne.)

When Elisabeth of Sponheim-Kreuznach, Countess of Vianden, died without issue in 1417, the four brothers, grandsons of Adelaide of Vianden, Elisabeth's great-aunt, inherited the County of Vianden with the lordships of St. Vith, Bütgenbach, Dasburg and Grimbergen. (Note: Dek (1970), p. 67 states that only Engelbert I, the third of the brothers, inherited the County of Vianden together with St. Vith and Bütgenbach, and furthermore Grimbergen, Corroy, Frasnes and Londerzeel. Vorsterman van Oyen (1882), p. 91 first states that John II received the County of Vianden on 27 February 1420, but later on the same page that only Engelbert I inherited it with St. Vith, Bütgenbach, Grimbergen, Dasburg, etc. According to von Stramberg (1865), p. 727 John II was named Count of Vianden in a feudal charter of the Palatinate on 27 February 1421.)

Shortly before his death, in 1420, Adolf transferred Altweilnau, Wehrheim and Rosbach to Walter and Frank von Kronberg for 4300 guilders, or rather only renewed an older pledge. Adolf is mentioned as living for the last time in the settlement with the Electorate of Trier about the lordship of Limburg of 22 April 1420, but as deceased in the settlement of his brothers with Lord Godfrey VII of Eppstein-Münzenberg about the County of Diez of 2 July of the same year. According to the Necrologium of Arnstein Abbey, 12 June is the date of his death. (Note: Dek (1970), p. 66, and Vorsterman van Oyen (1882), p. 90 also state that Adolf died on 12 June 1420.) Adolf was succeeded as Count of Diez by his son-in-law Godfrey VII of Eppstein-Münzenberg in one half and by his brothers in the other half. His brothers also succeeded Adolf as Count of Nassau-Siegen and Count of Vianden. On 2 July 1420, Engelbert I and Count Godfrey VII of Eppstein-Münzenberg transferred the County of Diez, which was an imperial fief, to Archbishop Otto of Trier, and received it back from him as a fief.

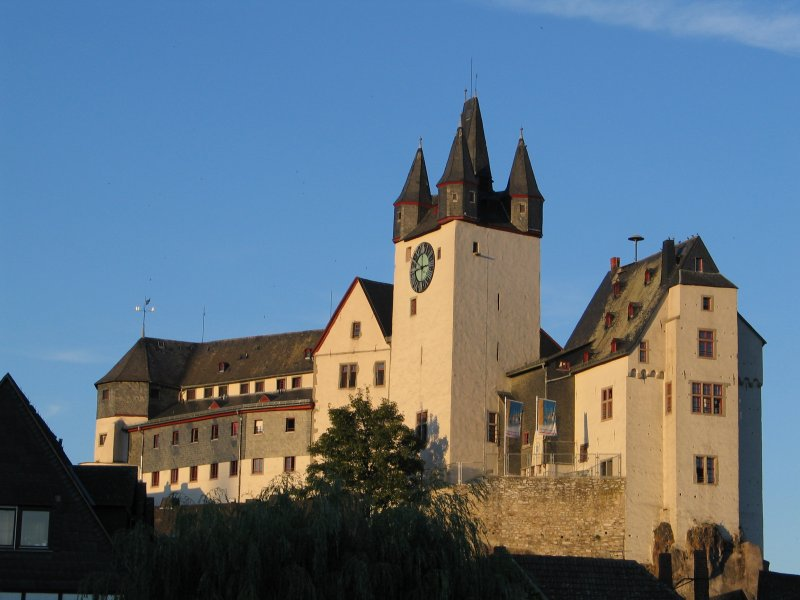
Diez Castle. Photo: Peter Klassen, 2006.

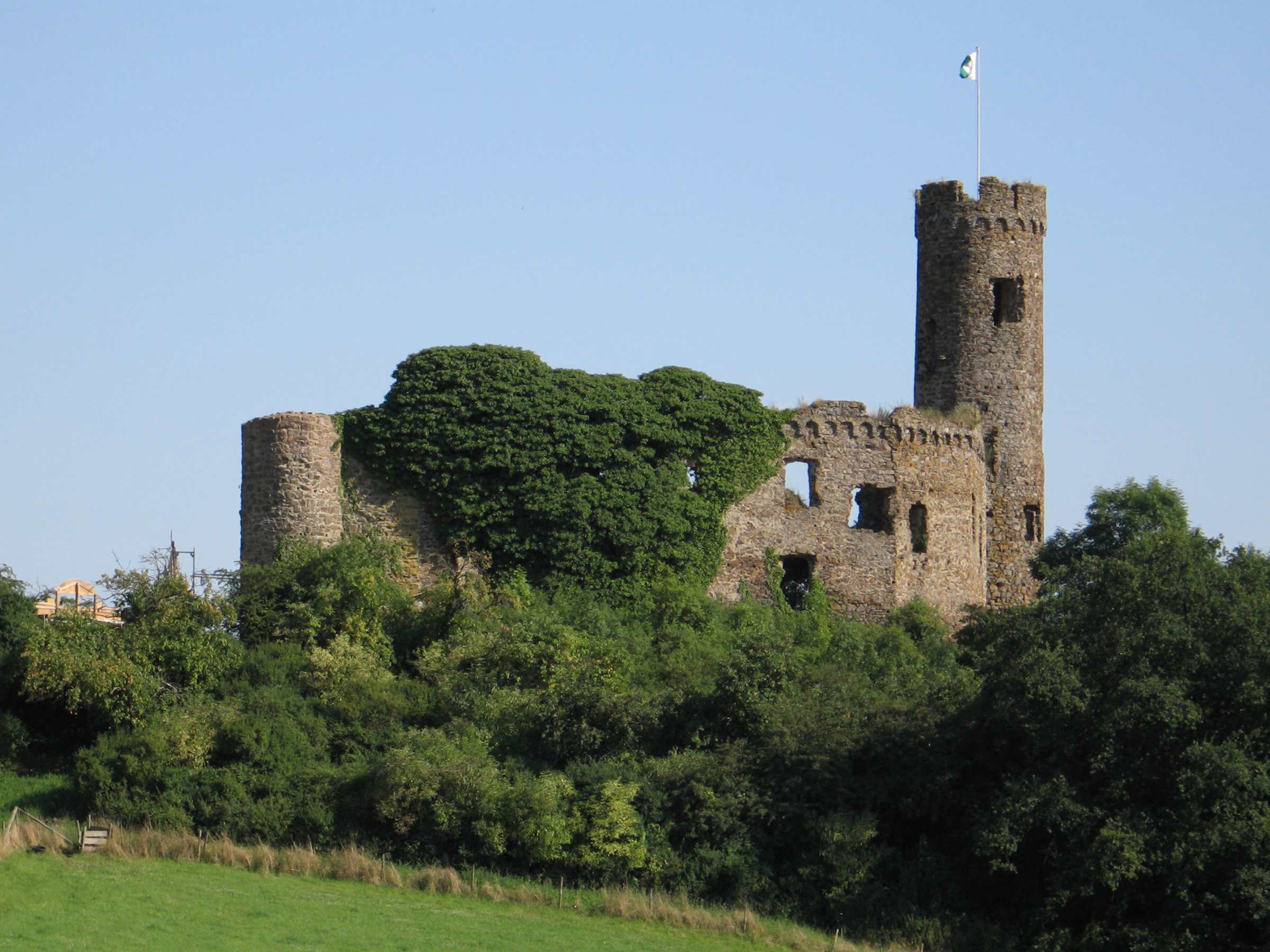
Ardeck Castle. Photo: Johannes Robalotoff, 2009.

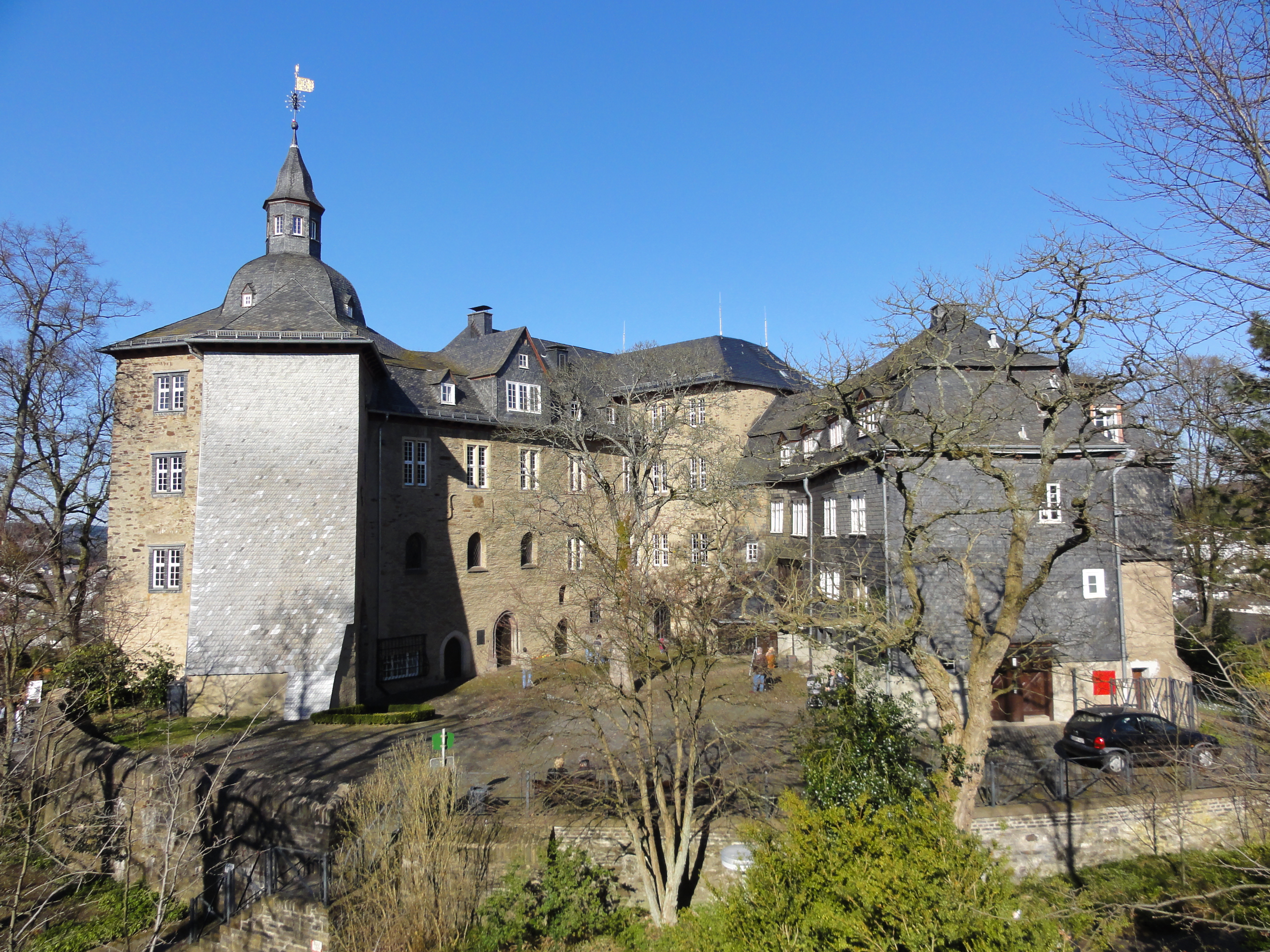
Siegen Castle, 2011.

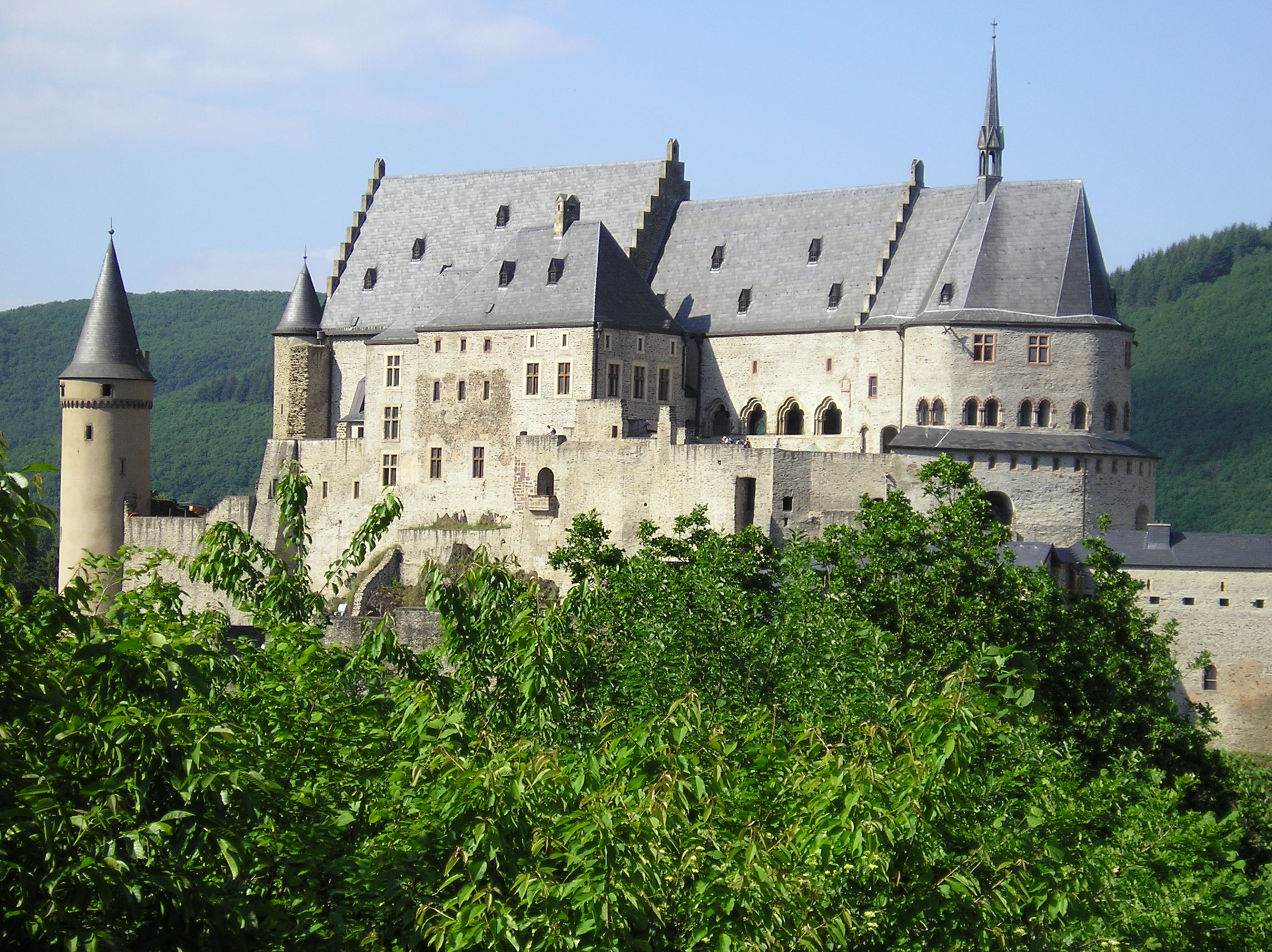
Vianden Castle. Photo: Vincent de Groot, 2004.

== Marriages and issue ==
=== First marriage ===
Adolf married (marriage contract 30 November 1376 (Note: Huberty, et al. (1981), p. 219 state that the marriage took place in 1388, while Dek (1970), p. 66, and Vorsterman van Oyen (1882), p. 90 state that the marriage took place in 1384.)) to Countess Jutta of Diez (after 1367 – 14 August 1397), daughter of Count Gerhard VII of Diez and Countess Gertrud of Westerburg.

Adolf and Jutta were related in the fourth degree, great-grandchildren of the brothers Henry I of Nassau-Siegen and Emicho I of Nassau-Hadamar. It was stipulated in the marriage contract that Adolf's father had to seek dispensation from the Pope for the marriage.

From the marriage of Adolf and Jutta only one daughter was born:

1. Jutta (d. 2 August 1424), married in 1401 to Lord Godfrey VII of Eppstein-Münzenberg (d. 28 June 1437), since 1420 Count of half Diez.

According to the marriage contract, Jutta received the still unpledged half of Altweilnau and Werheim as hereditary property instead of the dowry of 3000 guilders, with the right to redeem a quarter of it for hereditary property. If Adolf were to die without leaving any sons, the succession to the entire County of Diez was assured to Jutta and her heirs. A daughter whom Adolf might produce in a second marriage, on the other hand, was to have a right of inheritance to Diez before Jutta.

=== Second marriage ===
Adolf remarried in 1402 to Kunigunde of Isenburg-Limburg (d. 15 March 1403), daughter of John II of Isenburg, Lord of Limburg and Countess Hildegard of Saarwerden. The marriage remained childless.

== Ancestors ==
Ancestors of Count Adolf I of Nassau-Siegen
Great-great-grandparents	Otto I of Nassau (d. 1289/90) ⚭ before 1270; Agnes of Leiningen (d. after 1299)	Thierry II of Heinsberg and Blankenberg (d. 1303) ⚭ 1253; Joanna of Gaasbeek (d. 1291)	Godfrey I of Vianden (d. 1307/10) ⚭ 1278; Adelaide of Oudenaarde (d. 1305)	Louis of Arnsberg (d. 1312/13) ⚭ before 1276; Petronilla of Jülich (d. after 1299)	Engelbert I of the Mark (d. 1308) ⚭ 1273; Irmgard of Berg (d. 1294)	John of Arberg (d. 1281) ⚭ before 1273; Catherine of Jülich (d. after 1287)	Thierry VII of Cleves (1256/57–1305) ⚭ 1290; Margaret of Habsburg (d. c. 1333)	Reginald I of Guelders and Zutphen (c. 1255–1326) ⚭ 1286; Margaret of Flanders (d. after 1327)
Great-grandparents	Henry I of Nassau-Siegen (c. 1270–1343) ⚭ before 1302; Adelaide of Heinsberg and Blankenberg (d. after 1343)		Philip II of Vianden (d. 1315/16) ⚭ Adelaide of Arnsberg (?–?)		Engelbert II of the Mark (d. 1328) ⚭ 1299; Matilda of Arberg (d. 1367)		Thierry VIII of Cleves (1291–1347) ⚭ 1308; Margaret of Guelders and Zutphen (c. 1290–1331)	
Grandparents	Otto II of Nassau-Siegen (c. 1305–1350/51) ⚭ 1331; Adelaide of Vianden (d. 1376)				Adolf II of the Mark (d. 1347) ⚭ 1332; Margaret of Cleves (d. after 1348)			
Parents	John I of Nassau-Siegen (c. 1339–1416) ⚭ 1357; Margaret of the Mark (d. 1409)							

== Sources ==
- Becker, E. (1983) [1950]. Schloss und Stadt Dillenburg. Ein Gang durch ihre Geschichte in Mittelalter und Neuzeit. Zur Gedenkfeier aus Anlaß der Verleihung der Stadtrechte am 20. September 1344 herausgegeben (in German) (Neuauflage ed.). Dillenburg: Der Magistrat der Stadt Dillenburg.
- Dek, A.W.E. (1970). Genealogie van het Vorstenhuis Nassau (in Dutch). Zaltbommel: Europese Bibliotheek.
- Huberty, Michel; Giraud, Alain & Magdelaine, F. & B. (1981). l'Allemagne Dynastique (in French). Vol. Tome III: Brunswick-Nassau-Schwarzbourg. Le Perreux: Alain Giraud. ISBN 2-901138-03-9.
- Lück, Alfred (1981) [1967]. Siegerland und Nederland (in German) (2nd ed.). Siegen: Siegerländer Heimatverein e.V.
- von Stramberg, Chr. (1865). Denkwürdiger und nützlicher Rheinischer Antiquarius, welcher die wichtigsten und angenehmsten geographischen historischen und politischen Merkwürdigkeiten des ganzen Rheinstroms, von seinem Ausflusse in das Meer bis zu seinem Ursprunge darstellt. Von einem Nachforscher in historischen Dingen. Mittelrhein. Der II. Abtheilung. 13. Band. Der Rheingau. Historisch und topografisch (in German). Vol. Vierter Band. Coblenz: Rud. Friedr. Hergt.
- Vorsterman van Oyen, A.A. (1882). Het vorstenhuis Oranje-Nassau. Van de vroegste tijden tot heden (in Dutch). Leiden & Utrecht: A.W. Sijthoff & J.L. Beijers.

Adolf I of Nassau-Siegen House of Nassau-Siegen Born: 1362 Died: 12 June 1420
Regnal titles
Preceded by Gerhard VII	Count of Diez; 1384 – 12 June 1420	Succeeded by Godfrey VII of Eppstein-Münzenberg; John II with the Helmet of Nassau-Siegen; Engelbert I of Nassau-Siegen; John III the Younger of Nassau-Siegen
Preceded by John I	Count of Nassau-Siegen; 4 September 1416 – 12 June 1420	Succeeded by John II with the Helmet; Engelbert I John III the Younger
Preceded by Elisabeth of Sponheim-Kreuznach	Count of Vianden; 31 July 1417 – 12 June 1420	Succeeded by John II with the Helmet of Nassau-Siegen; Engelbert I of Nassau-Siegen; John III the Younger of Nassau-Siegen
