= John III of Nassau-Siegen =

German count (d. 1430)

John III the Younger, Count of Nassau-Siegen

Count of Nassau-Siegen; Count of Vianden; Count of half Diez
- Coat of arms
- Reign: 1416–1430 (Nassau-Siegen); 1417–1430 (Vianden); 1420–1430 (half Diez)
- Predecessor: John I (Nassau-Siegen); Elisabeth of Sponheim-Kreuznach (Vianden); Adolf I of Nassau-Siegen (Diez)
- Successor: John II with the Helmet of Nassau-Siegen; Engelbert I of Nassau-Siegen
- Full name: John III the Younger, Count of Nassau-Siegen
- Native name: Johann III. der Jüngere Graf von Nassau-Siegen
- Born: Unknown
- Died: 18 April 1430
- Noble family: House of Nassau-Siegen
- Spouse: –
- Father: John I of Nassau-Siegen
- Mother: Margaret of the Mark

Count John III the Younger of Nassau-Siegen (Note: In many sources he is called John III of Nassau(-Dillenburg). His official title was Count of Nassau, but it is incorrect to refer to him as the only reigning Count of Nassau, because the County of Nassau was divided into Nassau-Beilstein, Nassau-Siegen, Nassau-Weilburg and Nassau-Wiesbaden-Idstein. John co-ruled the County of Nassau-Siegen, which is erroneously called Nassau-Dillenburg in many sources. See note 2.) (d. 18 April 1430), German: Johann III. der Jüngere Graf von Nassau-Siegen, succeeded, with his brothers, his father in 1416 as Count of Nassau-Siegen (Note: The County of Nassau-Siegen is erroneously called Nassau-Dillenburg in many sources. The county was not named after the small, unimportant city of Dillenburg, which did not even have a church at that time, but after the, for that time, large city of Siegen, the economic centre of the county and the counts' main residence. See Lück (1981), passim. It is also evident from the numbering of the reigning counts with the given name John. One John without regal number who ruled the County of Nassau-Dillenburg in the period 1303–1328, and eight counts by the name of John who ruled the County of Nassau-Siegen in the period 1362–1638.) (a part of the County of Nassau). With his brothers, he inherited the County of Vianden in 1417, and also inherited half of the County of Diez in 1420. He descended from the Ottonian Line of the House of Nassau.

== Biography ==
John was the fifth son of Count John I of Nassau-Siegen and Countess Margaret of the Mark.

John was first documented in 1401. He initially became a clergyman, perhaps according to his father's wishes. He later took over the lucrative provostship of the cathedral in Münster, in place of his older brother Engelbert, who stepped down to the secular state. John served as provost of the Münster Cathedral in the period 1410–1414. The priestly robe, however, did not prevent him from being active in worldly affairs, and he especially became a capable swashbuckler. It is also assumed that he subsequently resigned from his position in Münster out of a predominant inclination for worldly matters, in order to be able to take part in all the undertakings of his quarrelsome brothers without any interference.

John and his brothers, Adolf, John with the Helmet and Engelbert, already agreed on a joint continuation of the government of the County of Nassau-Siegen, when their father would die, on 21 December 1409. Whichever of the brothers would be native or closest to his lands on the father's death should take possession of them in all brothers' name until a division would have taken place. Likewise, they promised each other, out of conviction of mutual advantages, not to inflict any violent advances on each other, and to allow the preferences of one and the other to apply, which had been established by older decrees. Whoever would take something for himself alone would be disinherited. All parental decrees favouring one brother over the other were declared null and void in advance. Adolf hereby tacitly renounced his right to the part of Nassau-Hadamar and the districts of Herborn, Haiger and Löhnberg, which he could have claimed in advance from the marriage contract with the heiress of the County of Diez. In accordance with this agreement, the brothers took over the government jointly after their father's death in 1416. (Note: Dek (1970), p. 66 and Vorsterman van Oyen (1882), p. 90 state that only Adolf and John with the Helmet succeeded their father.) However, the intended division did not take place: Adolf had no male offspring, John with the Helmet was not married, and John the Younger was a clergyman; it was to be expected that a division would not last long. Together, the brothers bought back the other half of the city of Siegen from the Electorate of Cologne. (Note: Lück (1981), p. 23 states that their father exchanged the County of Arnsberg in 1381 for the other half of Siegen from the Electorate of Cologne.)

When Elisabeth of Sponheim-Kreuznach, Countess of Vianden, died without issue in 1417, the four brothers, grandsons of Adelaide of Vianden, Elisabeth's great-aunt, inherited the County of Vianden with the lordships of St. Vith, Bütgenbach, Dasburg and Grimbergen. (Note: Dek (1970), p. 67 states that only Engelbert I, the third of the brothers, inherited the County of Vianden together with St. Vith and Bütgenbach, and furthermore Grimbergen, Corroy, Frasnes and Londerzeel. Vorsterman van Oyen (1882), p. 91 first states that John with the Helmet received the County of Vianden on 27 February 1420, but later on the same page that only Engelbert I inherited it with St. Vith, Bütgenbach, Grimbergen, Dasburg, etc.) When the actual transfer took place and in which year the brothers came into possession of the County of Vianden cannot be stated with certainty and reliability. It probably happened in 1420 or 1421, because it was in the latter year that John II with the Helmet was first named Count of Vianden in the Palatinate feudal charter of 27 February. A few years before taking possession of Vianden, Engelbert I had already come into possession of half the lordships of St. Vith and Bütgenbach. Vianden included 47 villages (with 583 taxable households in 1562). Apart from the city of St. Vith, St. Vith and Bütgenbach contained 51 villages with 814 taxable subjects, while Dasburg had 304 in 36 villages. The Counts of Vianden only partially owned the lordship of Grimbergen, and it could only partially be inherited by the House of Nassau.

John the Younger obtained Greifenstein Castle with the toll at Lahnstein from Roman King Sigismund on 4 April 1418. In 1422 he entered the service of King Sigismund with a salary of 500 guilders and, as a councillor, carried out important assignments for him.

After the death of the eldest brother Adolf in 1420, the three remaining brothers succeeded him, but they lost half of the County of Diez, (Note: "The other half came to the Count of Eppstein who had married Adolf's only daughter. Half of this half (i.e. ¼) passed to the counts of Katzenelnbogen (1479). Hesse inherited that in 1500.") as well as ¼ of Camberg in 1428. (Note: "The lords von Eppstein, already possessors of one half, then held ¾ of the Amt Camberg. One of these quarters passed to Katzenelnbogen, then, in 1479, to Hesse and returned to Nassau in 1557. The other two quarters came to the lords of Königstein, then to the Elector of Trier in 1564, and finally, in 1803, to Nassau, who thus again found itself in sole possession of the Amt.") On 2 July 1420, Engelbert I and Count Godfrey VII of Eppstein-Münzenberg, as the joint owners, transferred the County of Diez, which was an imperial fief, to Archbishop Otto of Trier, and received it back from him as a fief. On 28 October 1425, (Note: Dek (1970), p. 66 and Vorsterman van Oyen (1882), p. 91 state the date 1 August 1425.) the three remaining brothers established a kind of division: John II with the Helmet was given Dillenburg Castle, Engelbert I Herborn Castle, and John III the Younger Haiger Castle as his Residenz. John II with the Helmet, as far as some sovereign rights were concerned, was given the County of Nassau and the Lordship of Hadamar; Engelbert I received the County of Vianden in the same way, and John III the Younger half of the County of Diez. All of them, however, remained in joint ownership of these territories. The revenues were collected jointly and distributed equally.

In 1427, (Note: Dek (1970), p. 66 and Vorsterman van Oyen (1882), p. 91 state the date 24 December 1427.) a new agreement was made for four years. Of the land on both sides of the Kalteiche (the later principalities of Nassau-Dillenburg and Nassau-Siegen), each brother was assigned a third and John III the Younger was assigned Siegen Castle as his Residenz instead of Haiger Castle. This division, however, mainly concerned services and fines from the allotted places. Everything else remained in joint ownership. This joint government is particularly remarkable because of the addition it has gained, half the County of Diez and the County of Vianden with St. Vith, Bütgenbach, Dasburg and Grimbergen.

To settle the claims to the Duchy of Cleves and the County of Mark, (Note: The Nassau brothers had claims to Cleves and Mark through their mother Margaret of the Mark.) which had already led to hostilities, Duke Adolf I of Cleves, compensated the Nassau brothers with 12,000 gold guilders, Tuesday after Egidien (Note: Egidien, Ägidiustag or St. Gilgentag is the day Saint Giles is commemorated, which is on 1 September.) 1424. The Duke also appointed John the Younger as Oberst and Amtmann in the County of Mark on 21 September 1424, for a period of eight years. He earned a distinguished reputation for his useful services. John had already saved the duke from great embarrassment when he had been caught in the arms of a beautiful nun during the war with Duke Charles II of Lorraine and had been taken prisoner to Nancy. John then guaranteed the ransom for his friend, so that he would be released again. Yet, his association with Duke Adolf I of Cleves seems to have been short-lived, as John already took sides against his friend in the feud with the Electorate of Cologne.

In a treaty of 1429 or 1439, the Nassau brothers jointly ceded their rights to the heerlijkheden of Ravenstein, Herpen and Uden to the Counts of Virneburg for a sum of 21,000 gold guilders.

John's last fighting activity may have been the old family feud with the Landgraviate of Hesse, against which he and several of his relatives united with the Electorate of Mainz. John died unmarried on 18 April 1430. (Note: The other sources state that John died in 1429 or 1430.) He was succeeded by his brothers John II and Engelbert I, who jointly ruled their territories again, which continued until their deaths.

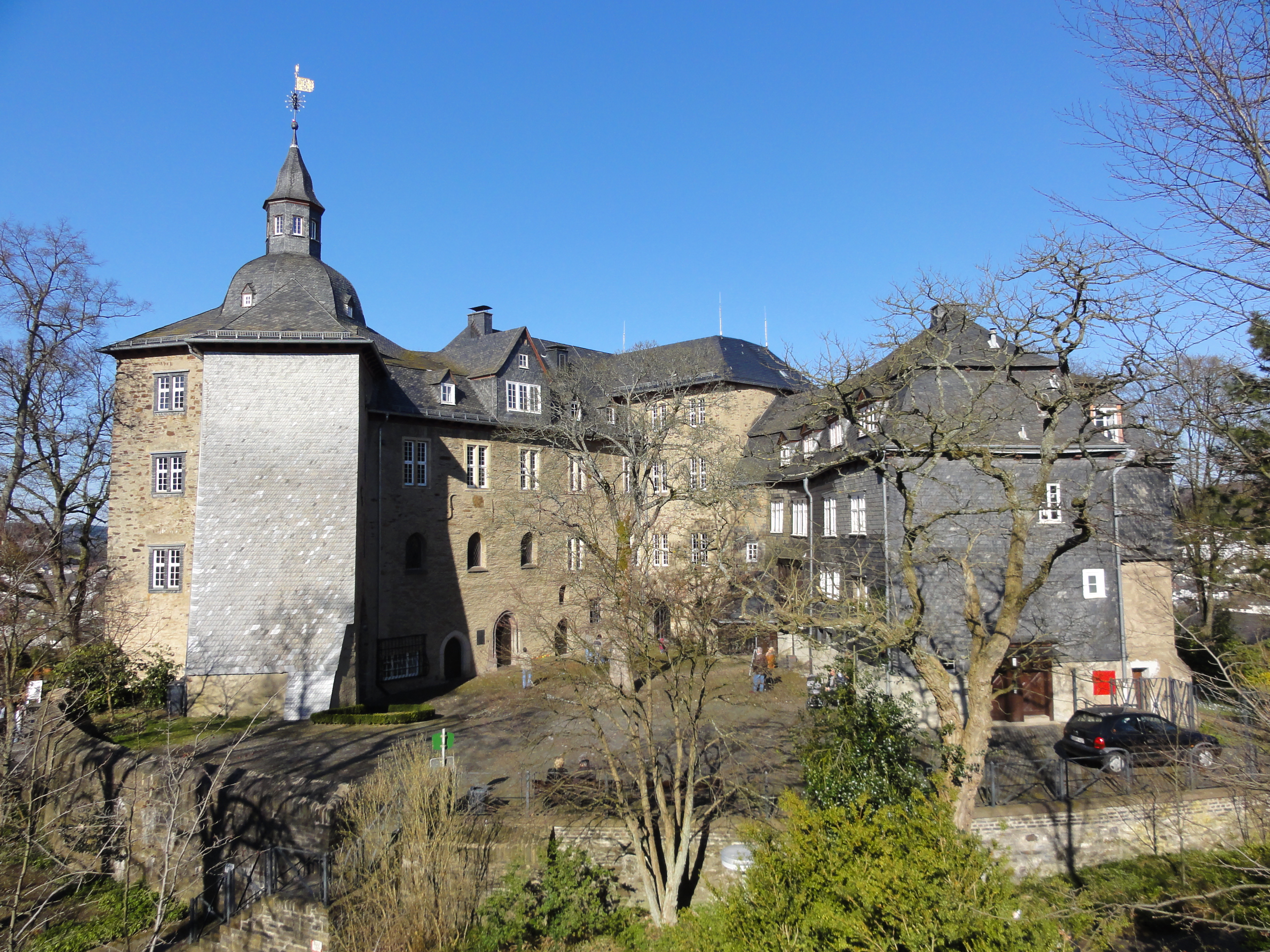
Siegen Castle, 2011.

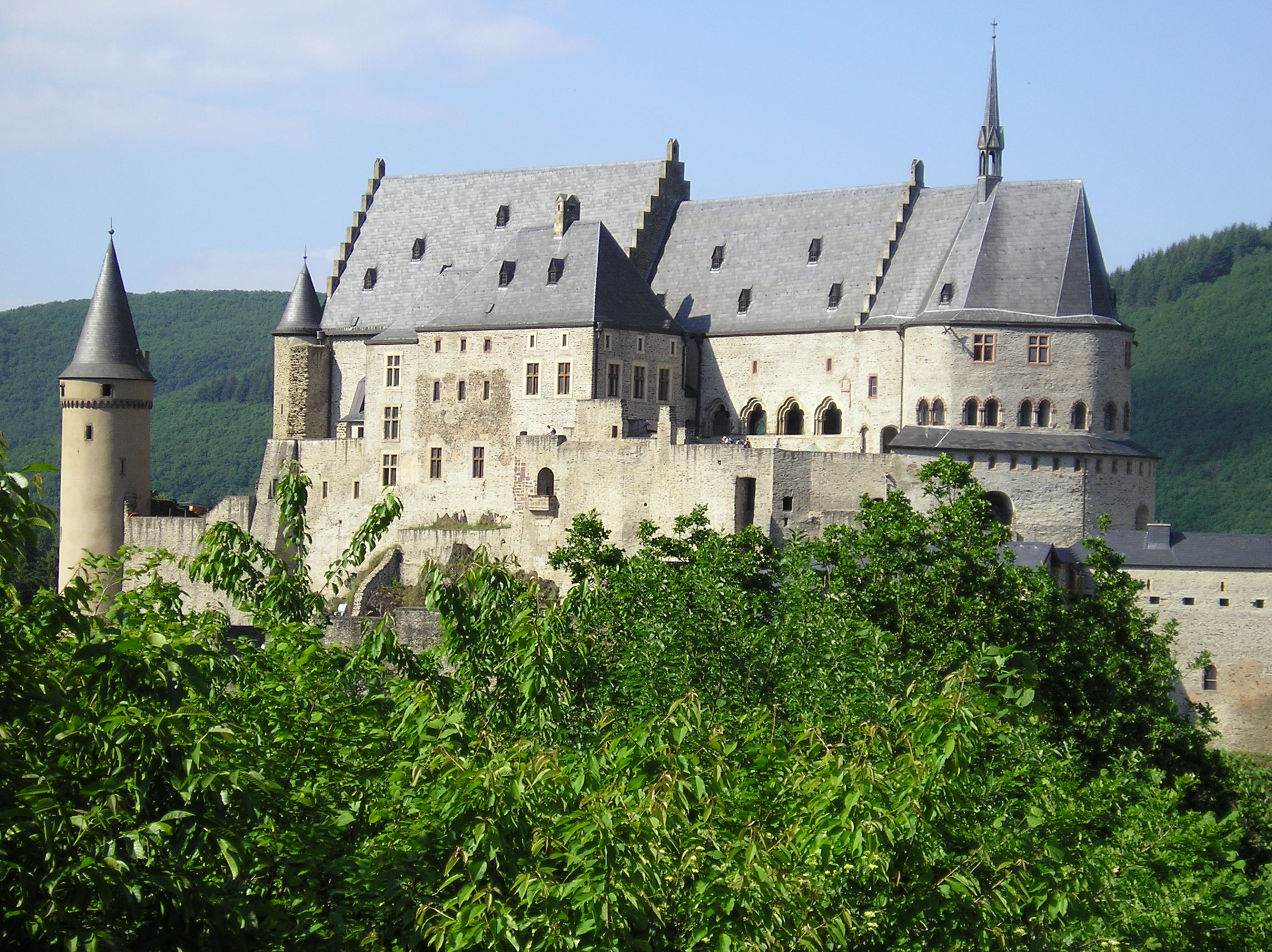
Vianden Castle. Photo: Vincent de Groot, 2004.

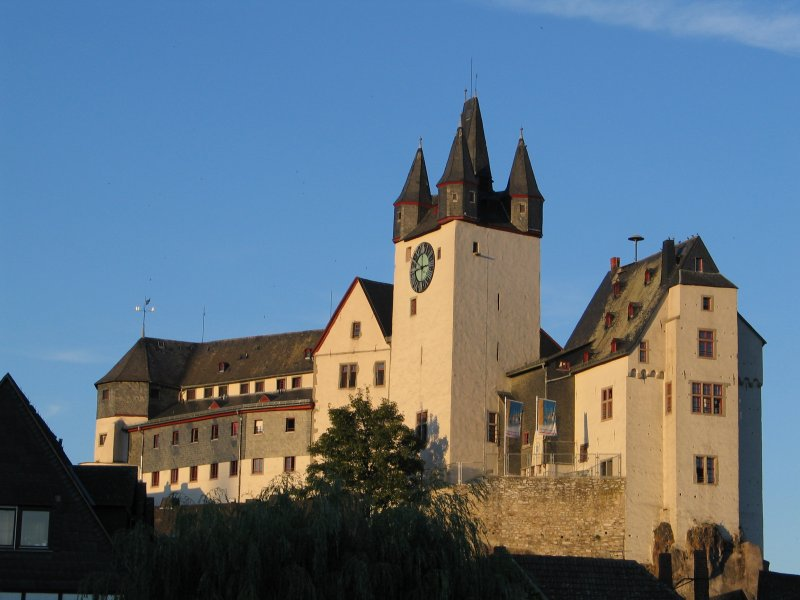
Diez Castle. Photo: Peter Klassen, 2006.

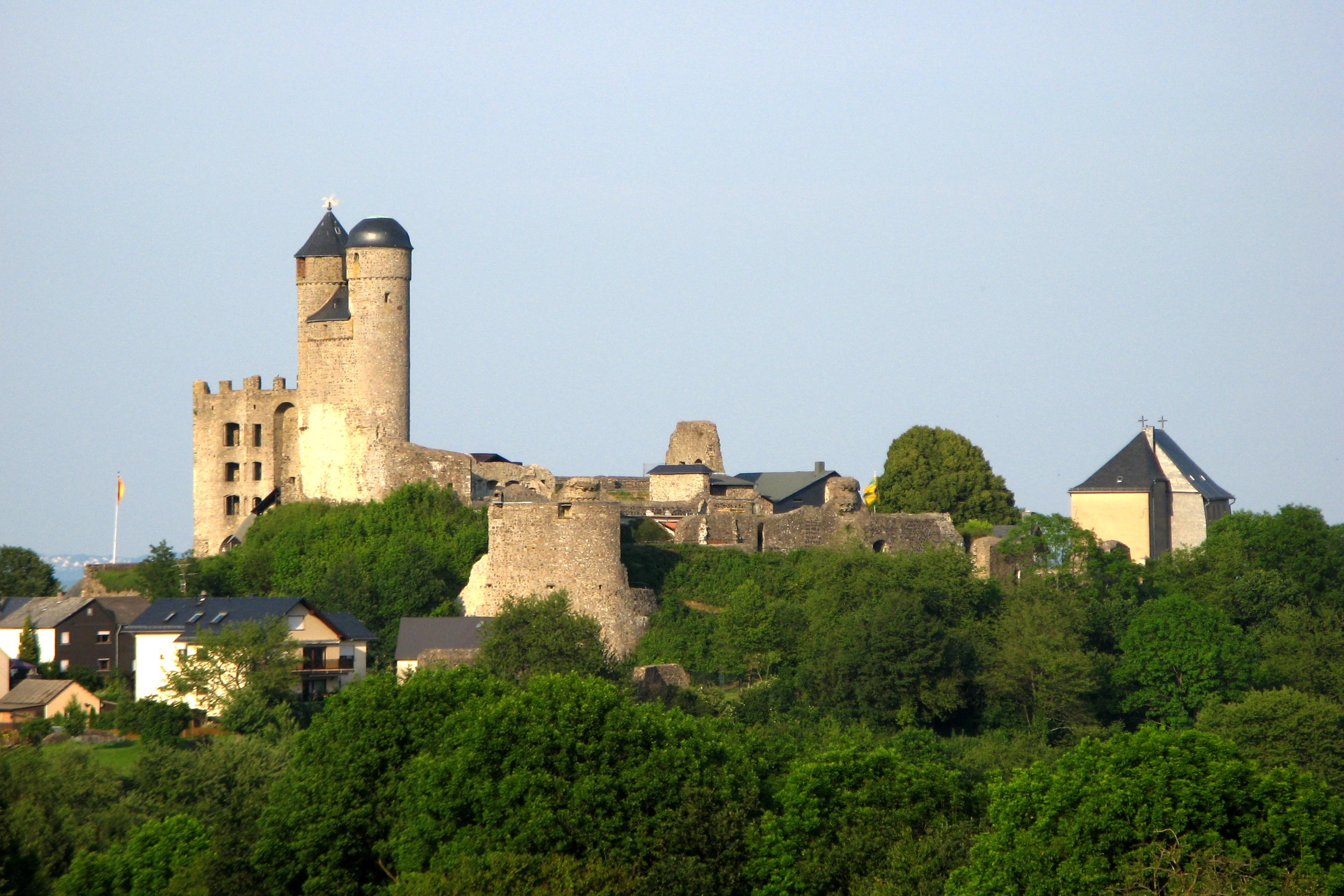
Greifenstein Castle. Photo: Oliver Abels, 2007.

== John's swearing letter ==
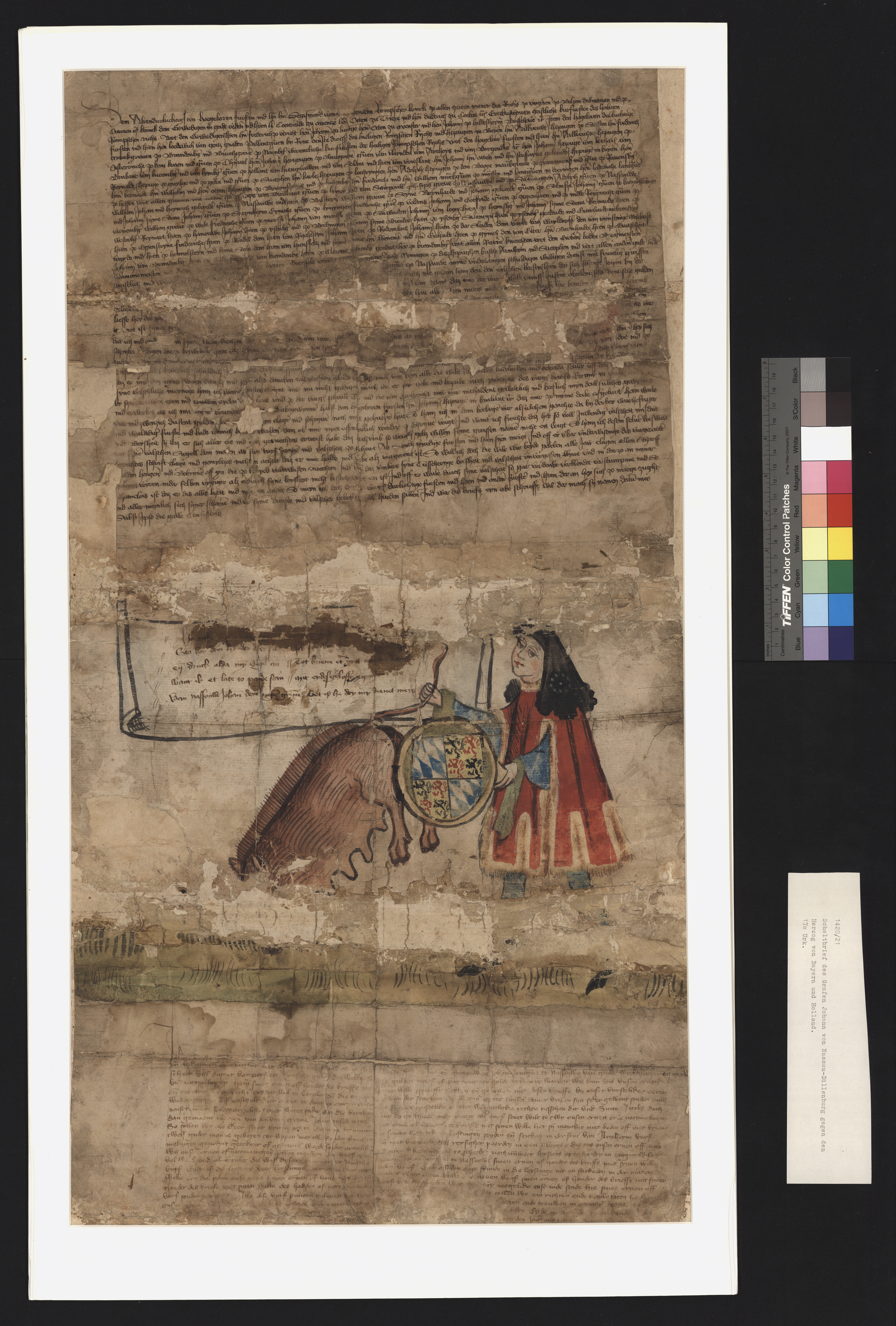
John's swearing letter against Duke John III of Bavaria (Hessian Central State Archives, Wiesbaden, Abt. 170 I Nr. U 1026).

John the Younger participated alongside Duke John III of Bavaria in the Siege of Dordrecht against Duke John IV of Brabant and Countess Jacqueline of Holland in 1418. (Note: John the Younger's elder brother Engelbert I was fighting on the side of John IV of Brabant and Jacqueline of Holland at that same siege. Hoffmann (1842), p. 136 states that this was the only time that John did disagree with one of his brothers, Engelbert.) Because John the Younger had the luck on his side, John III of Bavaria's army was victorious. For this military service, John III of Bavaria owed John the Younger 5,000 guilders, which, in a debenture, he promised to pay in Arnhem on 25 July 1419. However, John III of Bavaria did not pay his debt. After a complaint to a vehmic court in Westphalia was unsuccessful, John the Younger resorted to a swearing letter which he sent to several noble courts. This swearing letter disgraced John III of Bavaria as a word-breaker and non-payer of his debts. The letter includes a drawing that closely resembles a present cartoon in which John III of Bavaria is depicted holding up a pig by its curly tail and pressing his seal stamp on the pig's buttocks with the other hand. The accompanying text reads:

"Ich, der Graf von Hennegau und Holland,
stehe hier vor dem Hintern dieser Sau
und drücke hier mein Siegel an,
weil ich es verpfändet und nicht eingelöst habe
von dem Junggrafen Johann von Nassau.
In Briefen ist es doch nicht mehr zu Danke,
so wenig wie mein Eidschwur und meine Ehre.
Ein Thor, der mir noch ferner dient."
(English translation: "I, the Count of Hainault and Holland, stand here before the ass of this swine and do here affix my seal, because I have pledged it and not redeemed it, to Count John of Nassau. In letters it is no more to thank, as little as my oath and my honour. A fool who serves me furthermore.")

As proof of the debt, the letter also contained a copy of the original debenture from John III of Bavaria to John the Younger. The swearing letter is 80 cm long and 42 cm wide and is kept in the Hessian Central State Archives in Wiesbaden.

== Illegitimate child ==
John had an illegitimate daughter:

1. Elisabeth von Nassau, who was a nun in Cologne in 1501.

== Ancestors ==
Ancestors of Count John III of Nassau-Siegen
Great-great-grandparents	Otto I of Nassau (d. 1289/90) ⚭ before 1270; Agnes of Leiningen (d. after 1299)	Thierry II of Heinsberg and Blankenberg (d. 1303) ⚭ 1253; Joanna of Gaasbeek (d. 1291)	Godfrey I of Vianden (d. 1307/10) ⚭ 1278; Adelaide of Oudenaarde (d. 1305)	Louis of Arnsberg (d. 1312/13) ⚭ before 1276; Petronilla of Jülich (d. after 1299)	Engelbert I of the Mark (d. 1308) ⚭ 1273; Irmgard of Berg (d. 1294)	John of Arberg (d. 1281) ⚭ before 1273; Catherine of Jülich (d. after 1287)	Thierry VII of Cleves (1256/57–1305) ⚭ 1290; Margaret of Habsburg (d. c. 1333)	Reginald I of Guelders and Zutphen (c. 1255–1326) ⚭ 1286; Margaret of Flanders (d. after 1327)
Great-grandparents	Henry I of Nassau-Siegen (c. 1270–1343) ⚭ before 1302; Adelaide of Heinsberg and Blankenberg (d. after 1343)		Philip II of Vianden (d. 1315/16) ⚭ Adelaide of Arnsberg (?–?)		Engelbert II of the Mark (d. 1328) ⚭ 1299; Matilda of Arberg (d. 1367)		Thierry VIII of Cleves (1291–1347) ⚭ 1308; Margaret of Guelders and Zutphen (c. 1290–1331)	
Grandparents	Otto II of Nassau-Siegen (c. 1305–1350/51) ⚭ 1331; Adelaide of Vianden (d. 1376)				Adolf II of the Mark (d. 1347) ⚭ 1332; Margaret of Cleves (d. after 1348)			
Parents	John I of Nassau-Siegen (c. 1339–1416) ⚭ 1357; Margaret of the Mark (d. 1409)							

== Sources ==
- Becker, E. (1983) [1950]. Schloss und Stadt Dillenburg. Ein Gang durch ihre Geschichte in Mittelalter und Neuzeit. Zur Gedenkfeier aus Anlaß der Verleihung der Stadtrechte am 20. September 1344 herausgegeben (in German) (Neuauflage ed.). Dillenburg: Der Magistrat der Stadt Dillenburg.
- Dek, A.W.E. (1970). Genealogie van het Vorstenhuis Nassau (in Dutch). Zaltbommel: Europese Bibliotheek.
- Hoffmann, A.G., ed. (1842). "Johann III.". Allgemeine Encyklopädie der Wissenschaften und Künste. Zweite Section. H–N (in German). Vol. Einundzwanzigster Theil: Johann Infant von Castilien – Johann-Boniten. Leipzig: F.A. Brochhaus. pp. 135–136.
- Huberty, Michel; Giraud, Alain & Magdelaine, F. & B. (1981). l'Allemagne Dynastique (in French). Vol. Tome III: Brunswick-Nassau-Schwarzbourg. Le Perreux: Alain Giraud. ISBN 2-901138-03-9.
- Lück, Alfred (1981) [1967]. Siegerland und Nederland (in German) (2nd ed.). Siegen: Siegerländer Heimatverein e.V.
- Pletz-Krehahn, Hans-Jürgen (1994). "Der Herzog und die Sau! Dillenburger Graf wußte sich zu helfen". In Pletz-Krehahn, Hans-Jürgen (ed.). 650 Jahre Stadt Dillenburg. Ein Text- und Bildband zum Stadtrechtsjubiläum der Oranierstadt (in German). Dillenburg: Verlag E. Weidenbach GmbH + Co. KG. pp. 31–32.
- von Stramberg, Chr. (1865). Denkwürdiger und nützlicher Rheinischer Antiquarius, welcher die wichtigsten und angenehmsten geographischen historischen und politischen Merkwürdigkeiten des ganzen Rheinstroms, von seinem Ausflusse in das Meer bis zu seinem Ursprunge darstellt. Von einem Nachforscher in historischen Dingen. Mittelrhein. Der II. Abtheilung. 13. Band. Der Rheingau. Historisch und topografisch (in German). Vol. Vierter Band. Coblenz: Rud. Friedr. Hergt.
- Vorsterman van Oyen, A.A. (1882). Het vorstenhuis Oranje-Nassau. Van de vroegste tijden tot heden (in Dutch). Leiden & Utrecht: A.W. Sijthoff & J.L. Beijers.

John III of Nassau-Siegen House of Nassau-Siegen Born: ? Died: 18 April 1430
Regnal titles
Preceded by John I	Count of Nassau-Siegen; 4 September 1416 – 18 April 1430	Succeeded by John II with the Helmet; Engelbert I
Preceded by Elisabeth of Sponheim-Kreuznach	Count of Vianden; 31 July 1417 – 18 April 1430	Succeeded by John II with the Helmet of Nassau-Siegen; Engelbert I of Nassau-Siegen
Preceded by Adolf I of Nassau-Siegen	Count of Diez; 12 June 1420 – 18 April 1430	Succeeded by John II with the Helmet of Nassau-Siegen; Engelbert I of Nassau-Siegen
