= John, Count of Nassau-Dillenburg =

14th Century Count of Nassau-Dillenburg

- Died: 10 August 1328; Wetzlar
- Noble family: House of Nassau
- Father: Otto I, Count of Nassau
- Mother: Agnes of Leiningen

John, Count of Nassau-Dillenburg (died 10 August 1328, fell in battle near Wetzlar) was the third son of Count Otto I of Nassau and his wife Agnes (d. 1303), daughter of Count Emich IV of Leiningen-Landeck. John was a first cousin of King Adolf of the Romans.

== Life ==
=== Inheriting Nassau-Dillenburg ===
As a younger son, John was the initially destined for an ecclesiastical career and he became a canon in Worms. However, after his mother's death in 1303, he left the clergy and disputed the inheritance with his brother Henry. After a lengthy dispute, the county was divided between the three surviving brothers. The oldest, Henry (d. 1343), received Nassau-Siegen with Ginsburg and the Westerwald. Emicho (d. 1334) received Nassau-Hadamar with Hadamar, Driedorf and Esterau. John received Nassau-Dillenburg with Herborn, Haiger and Beilstein. A fourth brother, Otto (d. 1302), had also been a canon at Worms, but he had already died.

In 1306, John enfeoffed his share of the county to his eldest brother Henry, with permission of Landgrave Henry I of Hesse, with a provision that this share would fall to Henry at John's death.

=== Feuds ===
On 8 November 1308, John was enfeoffed by the Bishop of Worms with the Hundred of Kalenberg. Until then, the Lords of Hachenburg-Greifenstein and the Lords of Merenberg had been Vogts of the area, but John had managed to displace them. Soon afterward, on 31 March 1310, John purchased the hereditary possessions of the Lords of Merenberg in the area from Harrad VII (d. 1328), the last male member of the dynasty. These possessions included justice over Nederoth and Heimau. Count Engelbert I of Sayn, the son-in-law of the last Lord of Hachenburg-Greifenstein reached an agreement with John on 3 May 1325: with permission from his brother Henry, John enfeoffed Engelbert with territories in the counties of Dietz and Solms which had earlier been held by the Lords of Greifenstein, and in return Engelbert renounced his claims in the areas around Kalenberg and Herborn and became Burgrave of Beilstein.

Like his father, John fought in long and bitter feuds against the local nobility, in particular the Lords of Dernbach and Bicken, to impose his sovereignty. The Nassau family had been fighting the Dernbacher Feud about property rights in the Herborner Mark, the area around Herborn since c. 1230. This feud brought John and his brother Henry in conflict with Landgrave Henry II of Hesse, who supported the Lords of Dernbach against the ambitious Counts of Nassau. The Lords of Dernbach had sold their Dernbach Castle to Henry II in 1309. On 26 June 1312, a peace treaty was signed by Landgrave Otto I of Hesse and the brothers Henry, Emicho and John of Nassau. They agreed to stop building castles against each other and the Nassaus promised not to infringe on in the rights the Lords of Dernbach and Wilnsdorf had possessed during their father's lifetime.

=== Feud between Mainz and Hesse ===
In 1324, Archbishop Matthias of Mainz escalated his feud against Otto I of Hesse. This feud was originally about Lower Hesse, which had been held by Otto's half-brother John, Landgrave of Lower Hesse as a fief from Mainz. When John of Lower Hesse died childless in 1311, Lower Hesse fell to Otto. The archbishops of Mainz disagreed, arguing that as John had no sons, Lower Hesse should fall back to Mainz as a completed fief.

Matthias formed an alliance with the nobility in central Hesse and the Wetterau area, including the Nassau family. On 24 March 1327, John was appointed as Hauptmann of the Mainz-Nassau army. Later that year, he defeated the Hessian army at Seibertshausen in the Gladenbach Uplands. Landgrave Otto I died in January 1328, and his son Henry II continued the feud. On 10 August 1328, Henry II defeated the Mainz-Nassau army in a battle at Wetzlar. John fell during this battle. Matthias died four weeks later.

== Legacy ==
As John was unmarried, his possessions fell to his surviving brothers. Initially, Henry and Emicho administered Nassau-Dillenburg jointly. Later, Emicho renounced his rights, and Henry gave Nassau-Dillenburg to his eldest son, Otto II. In 1343, Otto II also inherited Nassau-Siegen. Thus, John was the only member of the short-lived older Nassau-Dillenburg line, and Otto II found the younger Nassau-Dillenburg line. The main line of this younger Nassau-Dillenburg line died out in 1739; the cadet line Orange-Nassau still rules the Netherlands.
