= Elisabeth of Nassau-Hadamar =

German abbess in Essen (died 1412)

Elisabeth Countess of Nassau-Hadamar (died 30 December 1412) was an abbess in Essen. After some conflict, she was accepted as ruler of the city.

== Biography ==
Elisabeth was the daughter of Count Johann of Nassau-Hadamar and the Countess Elisabeth of Waldeck, daughter of Count Henry IV of Waldeck. The year of her birth remains unknown. She was the eighth of ten children. Because of her aristocratic origin, she could join the chapter of nuns in Essen. In 1370 she was elected there as abbess. In the 14th century, the abbesses were sovereigns at the same time. To avoid electing a stranger, electoral capitulations were inaugurated. The oldest preserved capitulation of the chapter dates back to the year of Elisabeth's election.

Elisabeth's time as abbess contained attritions and complications. In contrast to her predecessors, she demanded the homage of the council and the citizens. In addition, she claimed the swearing-in of the citizen judge in front of the chapter of nuns. Although this act had been codified in the capitulation of the chapter she had signed, normally it wasn't implemented. As a result, the city created its own municipal court. Because the quarrel got worse, Elisabeth had her rule of the city confirmed by the emperor Charles IV in 1372. Only five years later, the city achieved independence and an imperial municipal charter autonomous of the chapter of nuns. The two documents were not incompatible.

A first agreement was achieved in 1399, in the so-called letter of divorce. Elisabeth got the regalia. Nevertheless, she wasn't allowed to demand any more swearing-ins. The city got its self-administration. Due to this letter, the secularization of the city from the chapter of nuns took place.

During her tenure, Elisabeth was responsible for many new buildings and reconstruction works on the cathedral of Essen, which had already begun under her predecessors. She died on 30 December 1412 after a tenure of 12 years and was buried in the cathedral.

== Literature ==
- Küppers-Braun, Ute: Macht in Frauenhand. 1000 Jahre adeliger Frauen in Essen (Essen 2002).
- Schwennicke, Detlev (Hrsg.): Europäische Stammtafeln NF 1 (Marburg 1980), T. 70.
- Stahl, Karl Josef: Hadamar, Stadt und Schloß. Eine Heimatgeschichte (Hadamar 1974).
- Elisabeth Countess of Nassau-Hadamar on Lagis
