= Otto II of Nassau-Siegen =

German count (1305–1350/1351)

Otto II, Count of Nassau-Siegen
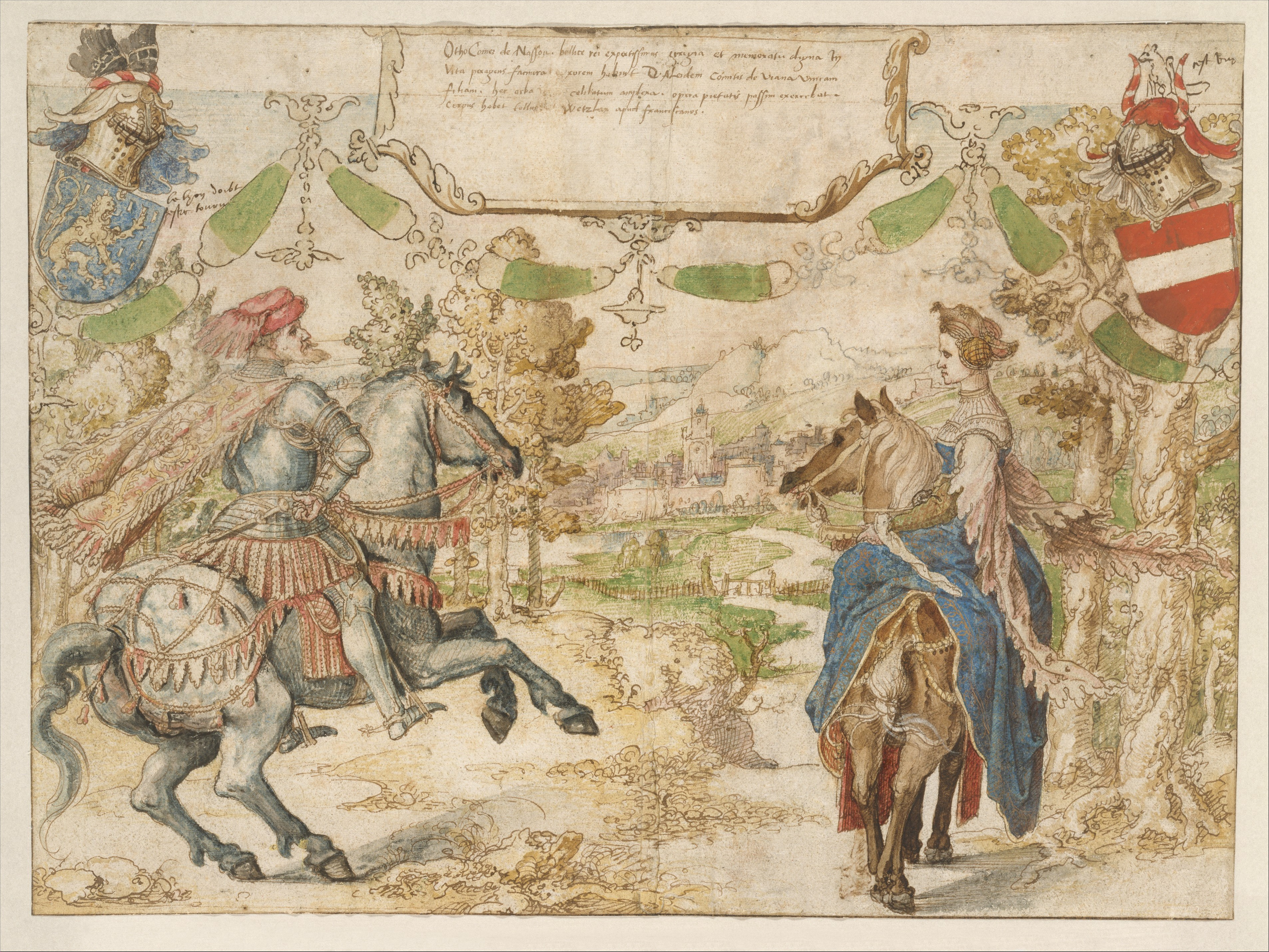
- Count Otto II of Nassau-Siegen and his wife Countess Adelaide of Vianden. Design drawing by Bernard van Orley for the tapestry from the series with the genealogy of the House of Nassau, 1530–1535. Metropolitan Museum of Art, New York City.

Count of Nassau-Siegen
- Coat of arms
- Reign: 1343–1350/1351
- Predecessor: Henry I
- Successor: John I
- Full name: Otto II, Count of Nassau-Siegen
- Native name: Otto II. Graf von Nassau-Siegen
- Born: c. 1305
- Died: between 6 December 1350 and 25 January 1351
- Noble family: House of Nassau-Siegen
- Spouse: Adelaide of Vianden
- Issue Detail: John I; Henry; Otto
- Father: Henry I of Nassau-Siegen
- Mother: Adelaide of Heinsberg and Blankenberg

Count Otto II of Nassau-Siegen (Note: In many sources he is called Otto II of Nassau(-Dillenburg). His official title was Count of Nassau, but it is incorrect to refer to him as the only reigning Count of Nassau, because the County of Nassau was divided into Nassau-Beilstein, Nassau-Hadamar, Nassau-Siegen, Nassau-Weilburg and Nassau-Wiesbaden-Idstein. Otto ruled the County of Nassau-Siegen, which is erroneously called Nassau-Dillenburg in many sources. See note 2.) (c. 1305 – between 6 December 1350 and 25 January 1351), German: Otto II. Graf von Nassau-Siegen, was since 1343 Count of Nassau-Siegen (Note: The County of Nassau-Siegen is erroneously called Nassau-Dillenburg in many sources. The county was not named after the small, unimportant city of Dillenburg, which did not even have a church at that time, but after the, for that time, large city of Siegen, the economic centre of the county and the counts' main residence. See Lück (1981), passim. It is also evident from the numbering of the reigning counts with the given name John. One John without regal number who ruled the County of Nassau-Dillenburg in the period 1303–1328, and eight counts by the name of John who ruled the County of Nassau-Siegen in the period 1362–1638.) (a part of the County of Nassau). He descended from the Ottonian Line of the House of Nassau.

Otto is not considered to have been a good regent. His short reign was a succession of feuds during which the country was devastated and the sources of prosperity were blocked.

== Biography ==
Otto was born c. 1305 (Note: Lück (1981), p. 22 and De Roo van Alderwerelt (1960) state that he was born c. 1300. Given the wedding date of his parents (before 1302), a birth c. 1305 is the most likely.) as the eldest son of Count Henry I of Nassau-Siegen and Lady Adelaide of Heinsberg and Blankenberg.

In 1336, Otto and his younger brother Henry concluded a provisional division treaty for their father's county. However, Henry's marriage in 1339 led to conflict between the two brothers. Otto even forged an alliance with Landgrave Herman I of Hesse against Henry in 1340. A new division treaty followed on 18 June 1341, which assigned to Otto the Siegerland, the Mark Herborn with Dillenburg and the district of Haiger, as well as Löhnberg.

Otto succeeded his father in July or August 1343. The following year, Otto sold castle and lordship of Löhnberg to Count palatine Rupert I and Count Gerlach I of Nassau. On 20 September of that same year, Otto was granted city privileges for Dillenburg by Holy Roman Emperor Louis the Bavarian.

Otto is not considered to have been a good regent. His short reign was a succession of feuds during which the country was devastated and the sources of prosperity were blocked. To control his expenses, he was forced to pledge possessions frequently and as a result the development of a powerful activity inwardly as well as outwardly was hampered. He was forced to sell the Nassau half of the city of Siegen to the Electorate of Cologne and lost all parts of the Land Wildenburg that Nassau had acquired to the County of Sayn. And in 1349, he had to pledge the parish of Haiger and half of Ginsburg Castle to the lords of Haiger and the Electorate of Cologne. Otto played no part in imperial politics, he only was a few times at the imperial court, where he obtained 320 guilders annually for himself from the taxes of the city of Wetzlar in 1347.

In his last feud, against the brothers Gottfried and Wilderich III von Walderdorff, Otto was killed in a battle, that, according to charters, must have taken place between 6 December 1350 and 25 January 1351. (Note: Dek (1970), p. 65 and Vorsterman van Oyen (1882), p. 89 state that Otto was killed in December 1350 or January 1351. Becker (1983), p. 12 states that Otto probably was killed in the Westerwald towards the end of 1350. De Roo van Alderwerelt (1960) states that Otto died near Beilstein at the end of 1350. And Ausfeld (1887), p. 708 states that Otto was killed at the end of 1350.) As participants on Otto's side in the feud are named the counts Henry I of Nassau-Beilstein (Otto's younger brother), John and Emicho II of Nassau-Hadamar (Otto's first cousins), Gerlach I, Adolf and John of Nassau (Walramian Line), Thierry III of Looz, Walram of Sponheim and Godfrey IV of Arnsberg. Otto was succeeded by his son John I, who stood under regency of his mother until 1362.

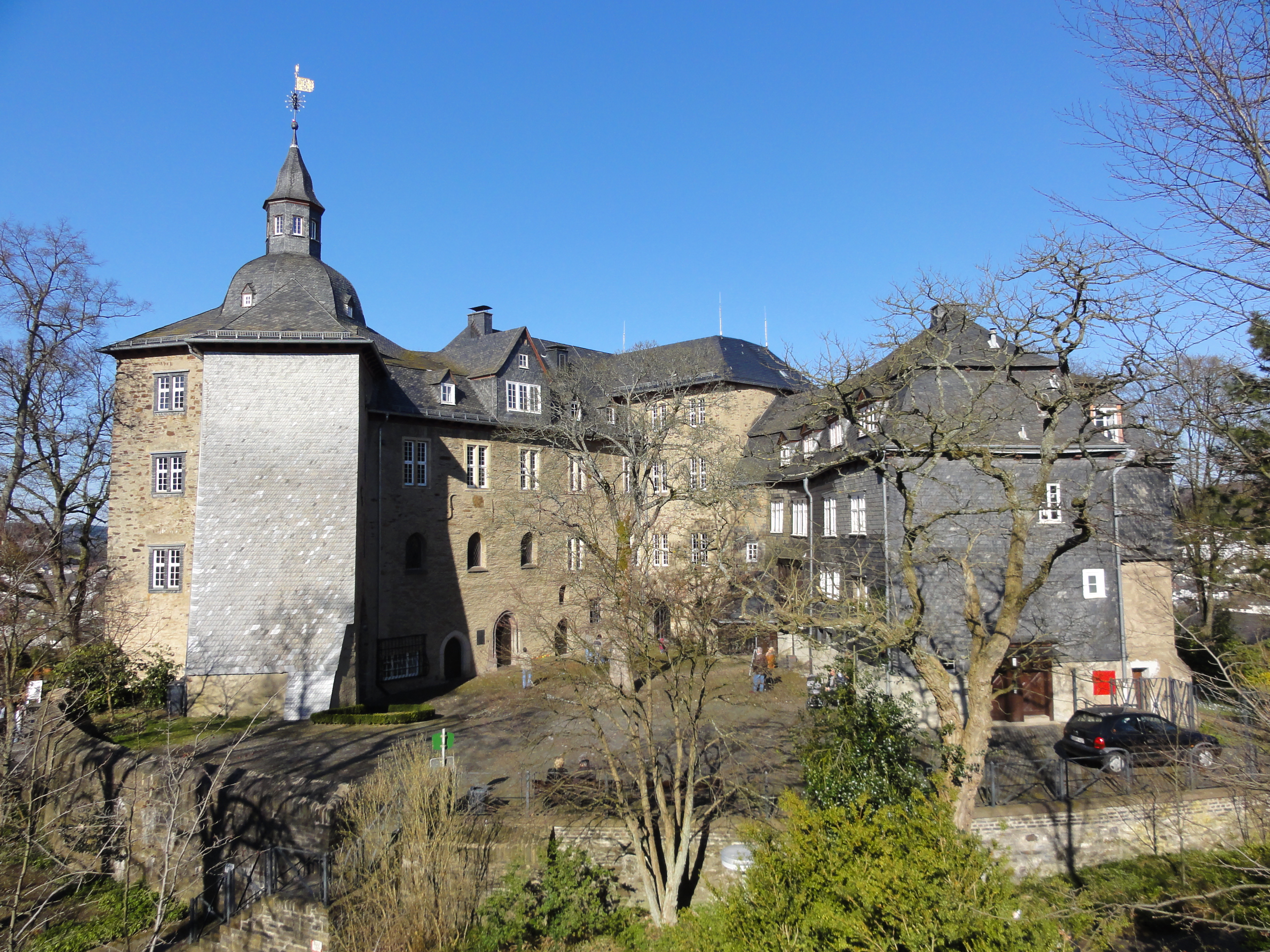
Siegen Castle, 2011.

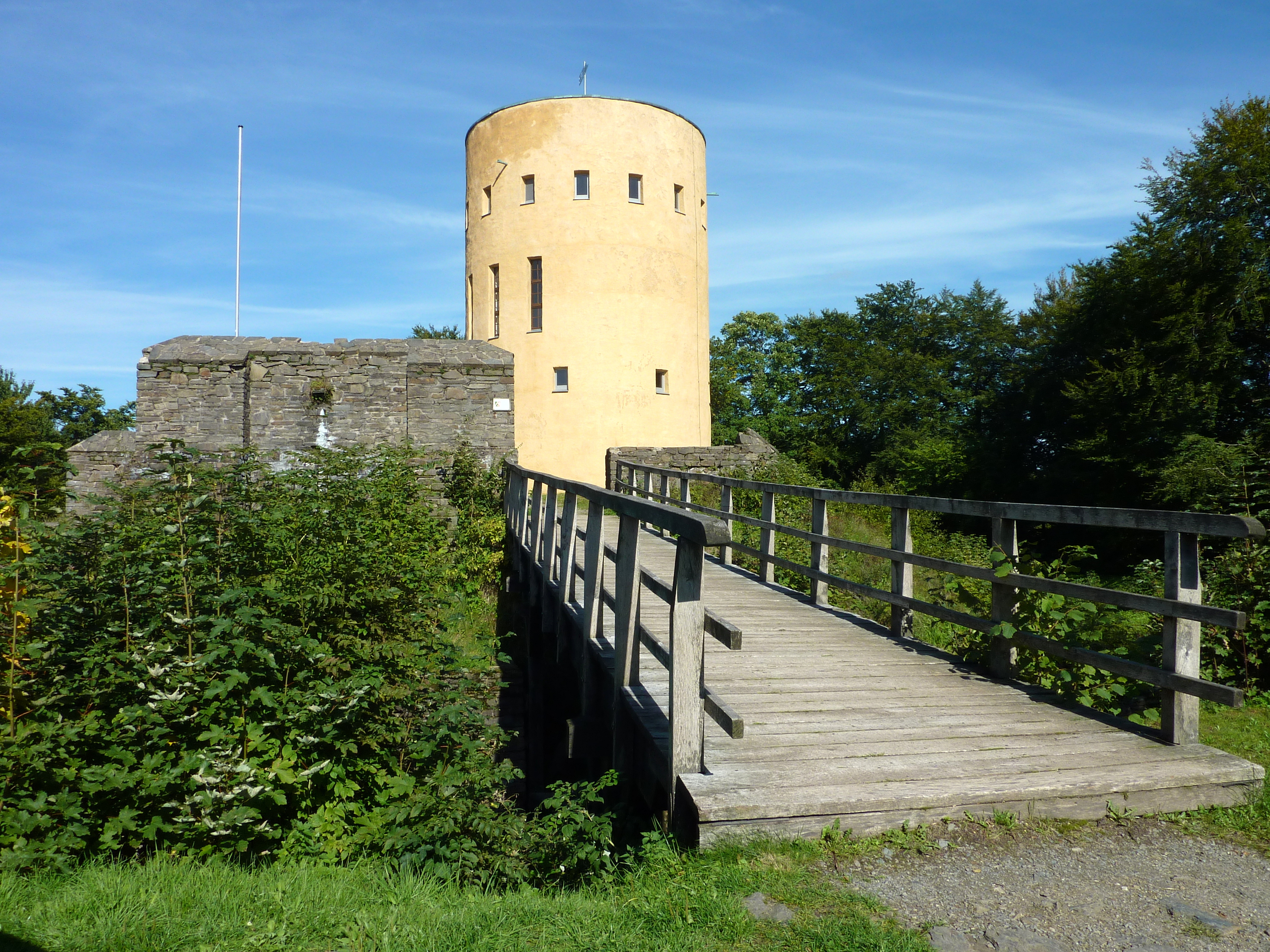
Ginsburg Castle. Photo: Frank Behnsen, 2010.

== Marriage and issue ==
Otto married (marriage contract 23 December 1331 (Note: Lück (1981), p. 22, Vorsterman van Oyen (1882), p. 89 and von Stramberg (1865), p. 712 state that the marriage took place in 1331.)) to Countess Adelaide of Vianden (d. 30 September 1376 (Note: Vorsterman van Oyen (1882), p. 89 and von Stramberg (1865), p. 712 state that she was still alive on 30 November 1376.)), daughter of Count Philip II of Vianden and Countess Adelaide of Arnsberg. (Note: Dek (1970), p. 66 states that the name of the mother was 'Lucia v.d. Neuerburg'.)

Otto and Adelaide were related. Otto's great-grandmother, Countess Matilda of Guelders and Zutphen, was a younger sister of Count Gerard III of Guelders and Zutphen, a great-great-grandfather of Adelaide.

From the marriage of Otto and Adelaide the following children were born:

1. Count John I (c. 1339 – Herborn Castle, 4 September 1416), succeeded his father as Count of Nassau-Siegen. He married on 30 November 1357 to Countess Margaret of the Mark (Note: Her name is incorrectly written as 'of the Marck' in several sources. That spelling of the name is only correct for the cadet branch of her family that bought the Lordship of Sedan in France in 1424, and named themselves 'de la Marck' ever since.) (d. 29 September 1409).
2. Henry the Swashbuckler (d. Kassel, 5 September 1402), was canon at the Cologne Cathedral since 1356.
3. Otto (d. 1384), was canon and provost of Saint Maurice Church in Mainz since 1357 and canon of the Cologne Cathedral and the Mainz Cathedral since 1380.

Otto and Adelaide signed a marriage contract with Count Adolf II of the Mark and Countess Margaret of Cleves, for a son of Nassau to marry a daughter of the Mark, on 14 August 1343.

The second son, Henry the Swashbuckler, although being a clergyman, was nevertheless a brutal fighter of his time, as the disconcerting epithet that his comrades gave him reveals. He even sometimes attacked his eldest brother John.

== Ancestors ==
Ancestors of Count Otto II of Nassau-Siegen
Great-great-grandparents	Walram I of Nassau (c. 1146–1198) ⚭ Kunigunde (d. 1198)	Otto I of Guelders and Zutphen (d. 1207) ⚭ c. 1185; Richardis of Bavaria (d. 1231)	Frederick II of Leiningen (d. 1237) ⚭ 1202/05; Agnes of Eberstein (1185/87–?)	? (?–?) ⚭ ? (?–?)	Godfrey III of Sponheim (1175/85–1223) ⚭ Adelaide of Sayn (d. 1263)	Thierry I of Valkenburg and Heinsberg (d. 1228) ⚭ before 1217; Isolda (d. 1220/22)	Henry I of Brabant (1165–1235) ⚭ 1180; Matilda of Boulogne (1170–1210)	Arnold IV of Oudenaarde (d. 1242) ⚭ Alix of Rozoy (d. 1265)
Great-grandparents	Henry II the Rich of Nassau (c. 1180–1247/50) ⚭ before 1215; Matilda of Guelders and Zutphen (d. after 1247)		Emicho IV of Leiningen (d. 1276/79) ⚭ Elisabeth (d. 1263)		Henry of Sponheim (d. c. 1258) ⚭ 1230; Agnes of Valkenburg and Heinsberg (d. 1267)		Godfrey of Gaasbeek (1209–1254) ⚭ 1243; Mary of Oudenaarde (d. 1277)	
Grandparents	Otto I of Nassau (d. 1289/90) ⚭ before 1270; Agnes of Leiningen (d. after 1299)				Thierry II of Heinsberg and Blankenberg (d. 1303) ⚭ 1253; Joanna of Gaasbeek (d. 1291)			
Parents	Henry I of Nassau-Siegen (c. 1270–1343) ⚭ before 1302; Adelaide of Heinsberg and Blankenberg (d. after 1343)							

== Sources ==
- Ausfeld, Eduard (1887). "Otto II. (Graf von Nassau)". Allgemeine Deutsche Biographie (in German). Vol. Band 24. Leipzig: Duncker & Humblot. pp. 707–708.
- Becker, E. (1983) [1950]. Schloss und Stadt Dillenburg. Ein Gang durch ihre Geschichte in Mittelalter und Neuzeit. Zur Gedenkfeier aus Anlaß der Verleihung der Stadtrechte am 20. September 1344 herausgegeben (in German) (Neuauflage ed.). Dillenburg: Der Magistrat der Stadt Dillenburg.
- Dek, A.W.E. (1970). Genealogie van het Vorstenhuis Nassau (in Dutch). Zaltbommel: Europese Bibliotheek.
- Huberty, Michel; Giraud, Alain & Magdelaine, F. & B. (1981). l'Allemagne Dynastique (in French). Vol. Tome III: Brunswick-Nassau-Schwarzbourg. Le Perreux: Alain Giraud. ISBN 2-901138-03-9.
- Lück, Alfred (1981) [1967]. Siegerland und Nederland (in German) (2nd ed.). Siegen: Siegerländer Heimatverein e.V.
- De Roo van Alderwerelt, J.K.H. (1960). "De graven van Vianden. Bijdrage tot een genealogie van het geslacht der graven van Vianden tot de vererving van het graafschap in het Nassause huis". De Nederlandsche Leeuw, Maandblad van het Koninklijk Nederlandsch Genootschap voor Geslacht- en Wapenkunde (in Dutch). 1960 (6): 196.
- von Stramberg, Chr. (1865). Denkwürdiger und nützlicher Rheinischer Antiquarius, welcher die wichtigsten und angenehmsten geographischen historischen und politischen Merkwürdigkeiten des ganzen Rheinstroms, von seinem Ausflusse in das Meer bis zu seinem Ursprunge darstellt. Von einem Nachforscher in historischen Dingen. Mittelrhein. Der II. Abtheilung. 13. Band. Der Rheingau. Historisch und topografisch (in German). Vol. Vierter Band. Coblenz: Rud. Friedr. Hergt.
- Vorsterman van Oyen, A.A. (1882). Het vorstenhuis Oranje-Nassau. Van de vroegste tijden tot heden (in Dutch). Leiden & Utrecht: A.W. Sijthoff & J.L. Beijers.

Otto II of Nassau-Siegen House of Nassau-Siegen Born: c. 1305 Died: between 6 December 1350 and 25 January 1351
Regnal titles
Preceded by Henry I	Count of Nassau-Siegen; July/August 1343 – December 1350/January 1351	Succeeded by John I
