= Emicho I of Nassau-Hadamar =

Emicho I, Count of Nassau-Hadamar
- Died: 7 June 1334
- Noble family: House of Nassau
- Spouse: Anna of Nuremberg
- Father: Otto I of Nassau
- Mother: Agnes of Leiningen

Emicho I, Count of Nassau-Hadamar (also known as Emich, first mentioned in 1289, died on 7 June 1334), was the second son of Count Otto I of Nassau and his wife Agnes (d. 1303), the daughter of Count Emich IV of Leiningen-Landeck. Emicho was the founder of the elder line of Nassau-Hadamar. He was a cousin of King Adolf of Germany. He and his brother Henry fought on Adolf's side in the Battle of Göllheim on 2 July 1298.

== Count of Nassau-Hadamar ==
Emicho I was a son of Otto, the founder of the Ottonian line of the House of Nassau. After Otto died in 1290, his sons fought a length dispute over the inheritance. In 1303, the three remaining sons divided the Ottonian lands. Henry (d. 1343), the eldest brother, received Nassau-Siegen, with Ginsburg and the Lordship of Westerwald. John received Nassau-Dillenburg, with Herborn, Haiger and Beilstein. Emicho received Nassau-Hadamar, including Hadamar itself, the Esterau, the Nassau share of the Lordship of Driedorf and the justice over Ellar, the Ottonian share of Dausenau and Ems and some dispersed possessions. As recently as 1290, the Lords of Greifenstein, who were co-owners of Driedorf, had forced Henry and Emicho to demolish two of their castles in Driedorf. On the other hand, a treaty closed in Wetzlar promised an end to the Greinfenstein's resistance to the Nassau expansion in the eastern part of the Westerwald. In 1316, Emicho finally managed to purchase the Greifenstein share of Driedorf for 250 marks.

== Properties in Franconia ==
In 1299, Emicho acquire considerable properties in the Nuremberg area, when King Albert I of Saxony mortgaged Kammerstein Castle, Schwabach, Altdorf, Kornburg Castle and the town of Kornburg to Emicho and his wife Anna, who was the daughter of Burgrave Frederick III of Nuremberg.

== Hadamar ==
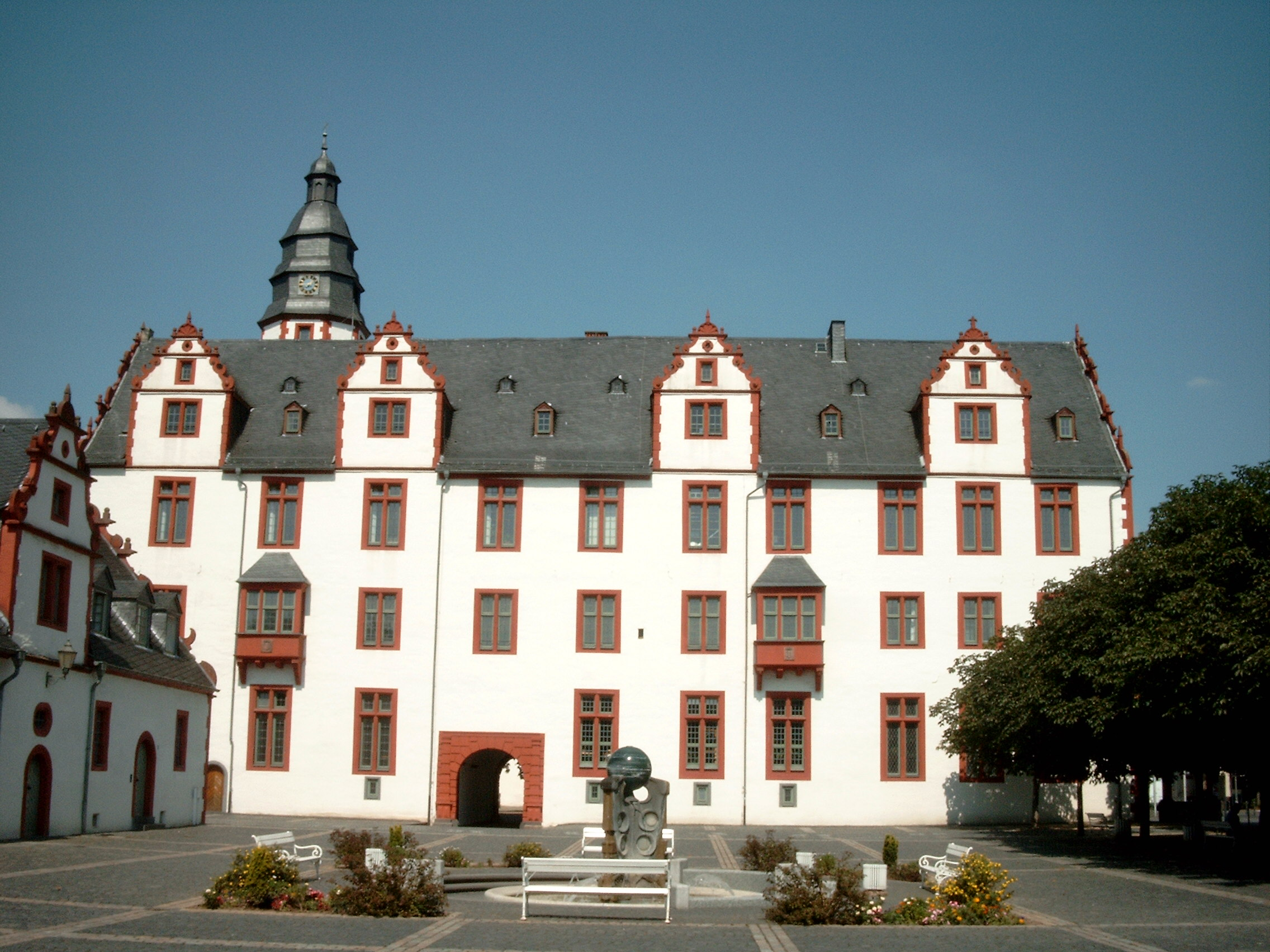
South wing of Hadamar Castle

On 18 December 1320 Emicho purchased a model farm from the Cistercian Eberbach Abbey. This farm was located on the left bank of the Elbbach, opposite Hadamar. The transaction includes the St. Giles church in Hadamar; the abbey retained various other properties in Niederhadamar, Faulbach and Niederzeuzheim. Emich expanded the farm to a water castle named Hadamar Castle, and built a new farm to the south of the castle. He moved his residence to Hadamar Castle. In 1324, Emperor Louis IV granted city rights, modeled on Frankfurt, to Hadamar and Ems. This allowed Emicho to fortify Hadamar with a city wall and a moat surrounding both the town and his castle.

The move to Hadamar was probably intended to make it easier to secure his interests in the County of Dietz and to continue purchasing property and rights from the House of Dietz, which was continually in financial difficulties. From 1317, Emicho acted as guardian of Count Gottfried V of Dietz (1303–1348), whose bad financial management had caused the decline of his county. In 1324, Emicho negotiated with Count Gottfried V of Dietz about the intended marriage of Emicho's daughter Jutta with Gottfried's son Gerhard VI (1317–1343). Emicho demanded extended guardianship rights over the County of Dietz, which was already owed him a considerable amount of money. When Gottfried reached adulthood in 1332 and Emicho's guardianship ended, Gottfried transferred his rights over Hadamar and the village of Dehrn to Emicho. On 28 March 1337, Gottfried of Dietz mortgaged the district of Ellar, which he had acquired this district only four years earlier from the Lords of Merenberg, for 1450 Limburgish marks to Emicho's son John.

On 4 April 1334, only two months before his death, Emicho transferred the Court and Castle of Hadamar to Archbishop Baldwin of Trier, who gave it back to him as a fief.

== Mining rights ==
On 26 February 1298, King Adolph of Germany mortgaged the rights to the Ratzenscheid mine near Wilnsdorf in the Siegerland area and the other silver mines in the Nassau territory to his cousins Henry and Emicho for 1000 marks' worth of pennies from Cologne.

== John's inheritance ==
Emicho's younger brother John was captain in the army from Nassau and Mainz that fought in the decisive Battle of Wetzlar that ended the Dernbacher Feud on 10 August 1328. John fell in that battle. Emicho refrained from his share in the inheritance, in favour of his elder brother Henry.

== Marriage and issue ==
Before 1297, Emich married Anna (d. c. 1357), the daughter of Burgrave Frederick III of Nuremberg and his second wife Helen, the daughter of Duke Albert I of Saxony. They had at least eight children:

- Anna (died probably before 1329), married before 1332 to Count Kuno I of Falkenstein
- Jutta (d. after 1359), married before 1324 to Count Gerhard VI of Diez (1317–1343)
- John (d. before 20 January 1365), Count of Nassau-Hadamar from 1334 to 1365
- Emicho II (d. 1359), from 1328 to 1336 canon in Mainz, from 1337 to 1359 co-ruler of Nassau-Hadamar
- Agnes, a nun in Altenberg Abbey in Wetzlar
- Helen, also a nun in Altenberg Abbey
- Margaret, married before 1349 to a Count of Hohenberg
- Margaretha (d. 1343), a nun in the Poor Clares nunnery in Nuremberg

Emicho died on 7 June 1334. His widow reached a compromise with her son John in 1336, in which she received the imperial Kammerstein Castle as her jointure, plus several manor in Franconia. She would also receive income in kind from John, from his possessions in Laurenburg, Dausenau, Hadamar, Nentershausen and the bailiwick of Weidenhahn and from farms and land in Hadamar (the manors Schnepfenhaus and Rödchen), Zeuzheim and Heftrich. She resided at Hadamar castle until 1349, then moved to Kammerstein Castle, where she died between 1355 and 1357.

== Footnotes ==
Emicho I of Nassau-Hadamar House of Nassau Born: before 1289 Died: 7 June 1334
Preceded by Otto I as Count of Nassau	Count of Nassau-Hadamar; 1334	Succeeded by John
