= Henry I of Nassau-Beilstein =

Henry I, Count of Nassau-Beilstein
- Born: 1307
- Died: 1388 (aged 80–81)
- Noble family: House of Nassau
- Spouse: Meyna of Westerburg
- Father: Henry I, Count of Nassau-Siegen
- Mother: Adelaide of Heinsberg-Blankenberg

Henry I, Count of Nassau-Beilstein (1307–1388) was a son of Henry I of Nassau-Siegen and his wife, Adelaide of Heinsberg-Blankenberg. His parents had initially destined him for an ecclesiastical career. However, he later married Meyna (Imagina) of Westerburg and after his father's death became the first count of Nassau-Beilstein.

Henry and Meyna had three children:

- Henry II, his successor
- Reinhard (d. 1412)
- Adelaide, married Hartmuth of Cronberg.

Henry I of Nassau-Beilstein House of Nassau Born: 1307 Died: 1388
Preceded by Henry I as Count of Nassau-Siegen	Count of Nassau-Beilstein	Succeeded by Henry II
