= House of Nassau-Hadamar =

Coat of Arms of Nassau-Hadamar, younger line

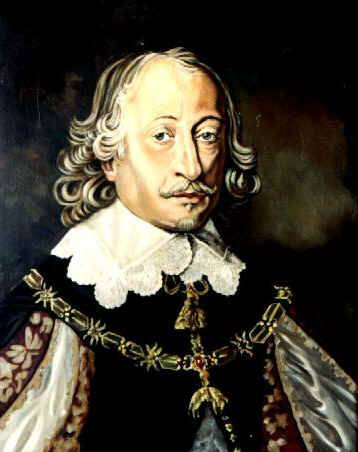
John Louis of Nassau-Hadamar

Nassau-Hadamar is the name of two side lines of the Ottonian main line of the House of Nassau. The older line of the counts of Nassau-Hadamar existed from 1303 to 1394; the younger line existed from 1607 to 1711 and received the hereditary title of prince in 1652.

== Nassau-Hadamar (Older Line) ==
=== Emergence ===
After the death of Henry II the Rich of Nassau his sons, Walram II and Otto I shared the inheritance in 1255. The boundary between the two territories was formed approximately by the River Lahn. Walram took over the southern part of the realm (Walramic main line) and Otto, the northern part (Ottonian main line). The marriage between Otto and Agnes of Leiningen gave the Ottonian main line suzerainty over the March of Hadamar.

Otto's death in 1290 led to repeated inheritance disputes among his sons. In 1303, they shared his estate, under the mediation of John I of Limburg. The eldest son Henry took over the sub-county of Nassau-Siegen with its estate in the Siegerland and the Barony of Westerwald, the second son Emich/Emicho I inherited the sub-county of Nassau-Hadamar with Driedorf and Esterau, and the third son, John the sub-county of Nassau-Dillenburg with its estates around Dillenburg, Herborn, Mengerskirchen, the Calenberg Tithe and the jurisdiction (Gericht) of Heimau.

=== Regents ===
- John Louis of Nassau-Hadamar (1620–1653), became prince in 1650
- Maurice Henry of Nassau-Hadamar (1653–1679)
- Francis Alexander of Nassau-Hadamar (1679–1711)
  - Wardship by Francis Bernard of Nassau-Hadamar (1679–1694)
  - Divided between other Ottonian-Nassau houses (1712–1742)
- William Hyacinth of Nassau-Siegen (1742–1743)
  - Nassau-Hadamar falls entirely to Orange-Nassau.

== Literature ==
- Hellmuth Gensicke (1999), Landesgeschichte des Westerwaldes (in German) (3rd ed.), Wiesbaden: Historische Kommission für Nassau, ISBN 3-922244-80-7
- Walter Rudersdorf (1967), Gemeinde Ellar/Westerwald (ed.), Im Schatten der Burg Ellar (in German), Frankfurt am Main: Waldemar Kramer
- Jacob Wagner: Die Regentenfamilie von Nassau-Hadamar: Geschichte des Fürstenthums Hadamar mit besonderer Rücksicht auf seine Kirchengeschichte, von den ältesten Zeiten bis auf unsere Tage, nach Urkunden bearbeitet, Mechitharisten, 1863 (Band 1: Google Books, Band 2: Google Books)
