= Henry I of Nassau-Siegen =

Count of Nassau-Siegen (1303–1343)

Henry I
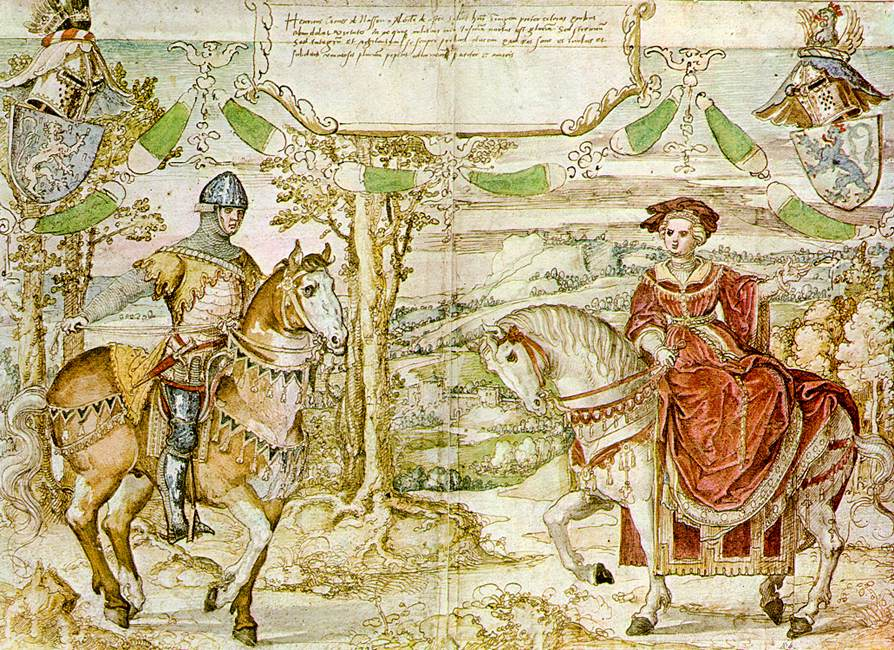
- Drawing by Bernard van Orley for the tapestry with Henry I of Nassau-Siegen and Adelaide of Heinsberg and Blankenburg
- Born: c. 1270
- Died: between 13 July and 14 August 1343
- Noble family: House of Nassau-Siegen
- Spouse: Adelaide of Heinsberg and Blankenberg
- Issue: Otto II, Count of Nassau-Siegen; Henry I, Count of Nassau-Beilstein
- Father: Otto I of Nassau
- Mother: Agnes of Leiningen

Henry I of Nassau-Siegen (German: Heinrich I. von Nassau-Siegen; c. 1270 – between 13 July and 14 August 1343) was Count of Nassau-Siegen, a part of the County of Nassau, and ancestor of the House of Nassau-Siegen. He comes from the Ottonian branch of the House of Nassau.

== Life ==
Henry was the eldest son of Count Otto I of Nassau and Agnes of Leiningen, a daughter of Count Emich IV of Leiningen and Elisabeth. He was probably born in the 60s of the 13th century, as he already appeared as an adult around 1281.

In 1288 Henry took part in the Battle of Worringen alongside Archbishop Siegfried II of Cologne and fell into the hands of the citizens of the city of Cologne, whom he had to swear in 1289 the so-called Urfehde. He came to an agreement with the Archbishop on his claim for compensation in 1295 at the court day in Frankfurt.

=== Count of Nassau ===
In 1290 Henry succeeded his father together with his brothers Emicho and John.

In 1292 Henry supported his cousin Adolf of Nassau in the royal election by agreeing to the pledging of Nassau property to the Archbishop of Cologne. Henry remained an ally of his cousin and in 1294, 1295 and 1297 he was commander of the army against Landgrave Albert II ‘the Degenerate’ of Thuringia. In 1297-1298 Henry was deputy to the Roman King and governor of the Margravate of Meissen and Pleissnerland. During the reign of Adolf, Henry participated in the campaign of Count Guy of Flanders against King Philip IV ‘the Fair’ of France.

On February 26, 1298, Adolf pledged his cousins Henry and Emicho for 1000 mark Cologne pennies the iron and silver mine Ratzenscheid near Wilnsdorf in Siegerland and the other quarries in their area where silver could be extracted. This laid the foundation for the Bergregal (the rights to the mineral resources in their area) of the counts of Nassau. On 2 July 1298, Henry and Emicho fought alongside Adolf in the Battle of Göllheim, in which Adolf was killed.

No matter how faithful Henry had been to his cousin Adolf in his fight against Albert of Habsburg, after Adolf died, Henry soon passed over to Albert. Already in 1301, Albert took Henry and his brothers into his army for a reward of 1000 marks. Part of that amount had to be paid by Kraft of Greifenstein, on which the later claims of the Counts of Nassau on the lordship Greifenstein were based.

=== Count of Nassau-Siegen ===
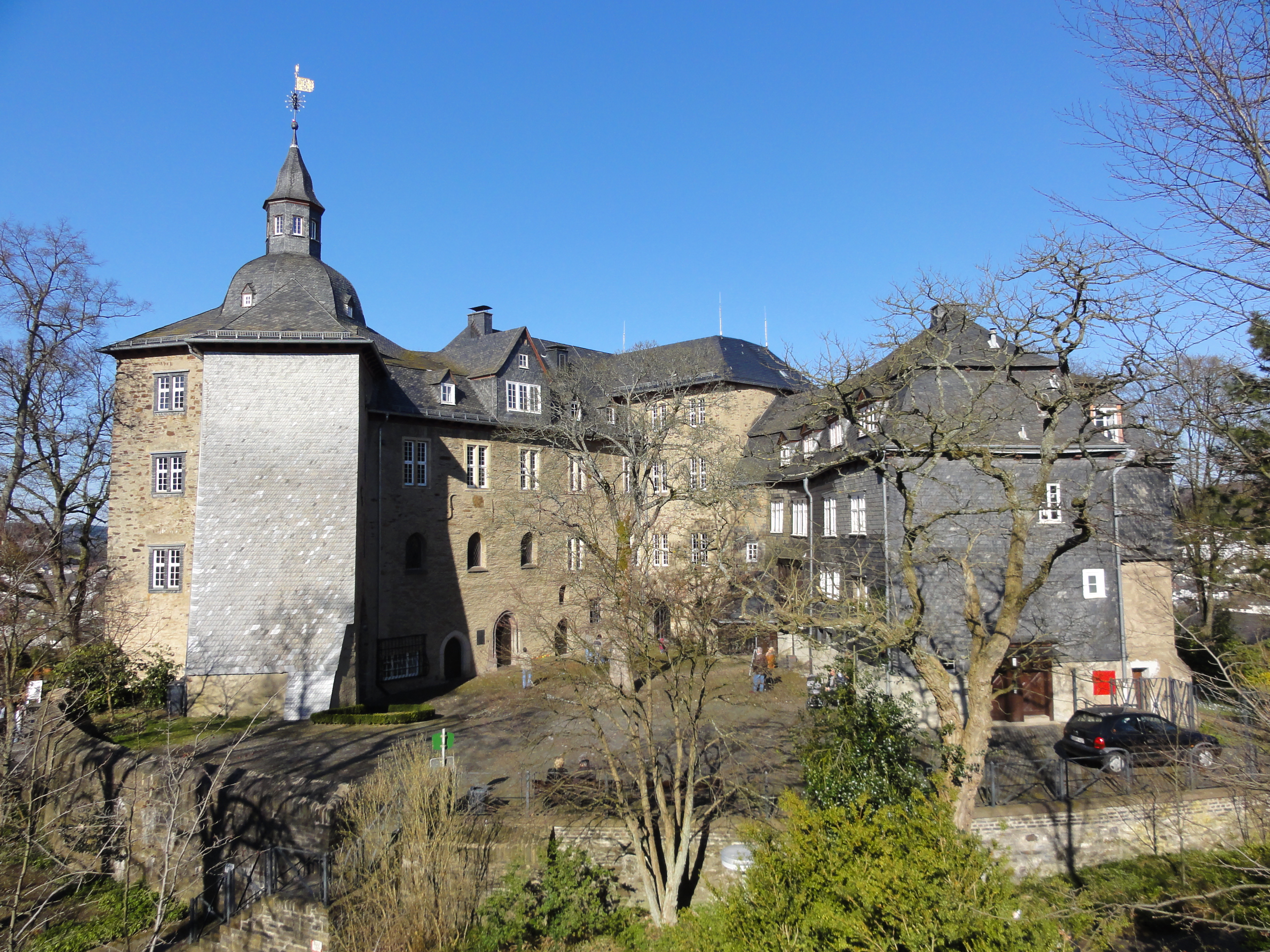
Siegen Castle

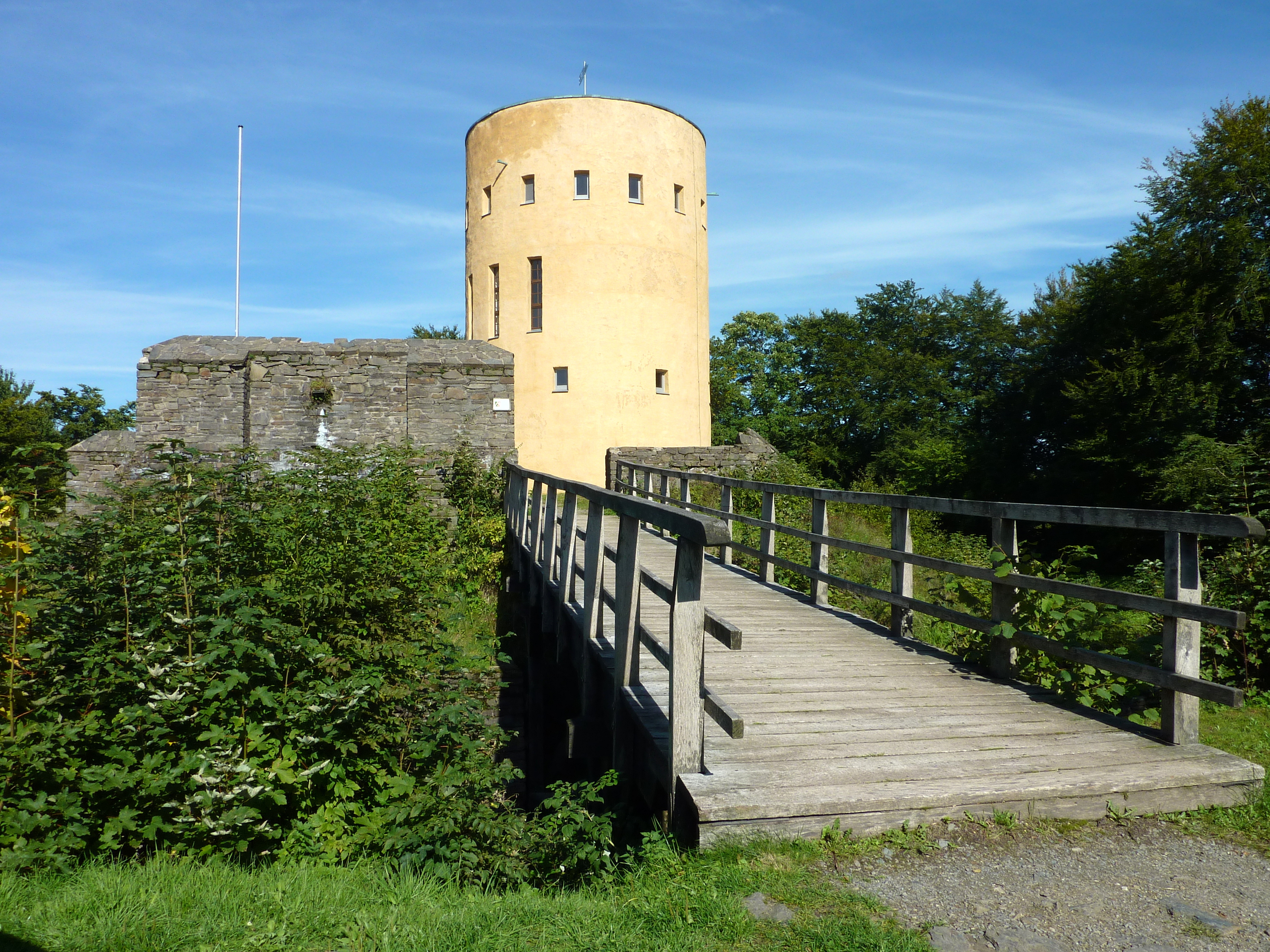
Ginsburg Castle

Coat of Arms of the Counts of Nassau from the Ottonian branch

In 1303, after a long dispute, the County of Nassau was divided among the three surviving brothers. Henry obtained Siegen, Ginsburg Castle, Haiger and the lordship Westerwald. He later obtained the Vogtei Krombach and the right to the Gericht Selbach im Freien Grund.

Henry participated in the feud of Archbishop Wigbold I of Cologne against the Counts of Mark in his attempts to reduce the damage sustained by the Archdiocese of Cologne after the Battle of Worringen.

In a charter dated 28 February 1305, “Henricus comes de Nassauwe” and “fratri nostro Emichoni comiti ibidem … eius … conjugi … Anne” reached an agreement on the distribution of the legacy of “auum nostrum Emichonem comitem de Liningen et ex morte Emichonis filii sui comitis ibidem nostri avunculi”.

In 1306, Henry's youngest brother John, with the permission of Landgrave Henry I of Hesse, granted his possessions (Dillenburg Castle, Herborn and the Kalenberger Zent) to Henry as a fief, stipulating that his shire would pass to his brother with his death.

In 1309 Henry bought out the Lords von Wilnsdorf and vom Haim and made them vassals of Nassau. In 1311 he obtained half, and two years later the whole, of Molsberg, in 1314 he obtained the Propstei of Eibelshausen and later the Amt Ebersbach.

Henry and his brother John got involved in heavy disputes with the Landgraves of Hesse, who, as lords, supported the local gentry against the ambitions of the Nassaus. In the Dernbacher Feud, which had started around 1230, for the supremacy in the Mark of Herborn, the landgraves of Hesse had sold Dernbach Castle in 1309 to the Dernbach heirs. In the comparison concluded on 26 June 1312 between Landgrave Otto I of Hesse on the one hand and the counts Henry, Emicho and John of Nassau on the other, both parties agreed not to build castles against each other anymore, and the Nassaus admitted that they were not allowed to restrain the rights of Lords von Dernbach and von Wilnsdorf, which they had possessed at the time of Count Otto I of Nassau.

In the conflict between Frederick ‘the Fair’ of Austria and Louis ‘the Bavarian’, Henry and his brothers stood by the former. In November 1314, the brothers attended the crowning of Frederick ‘the Fair’ by the Archbishop of Cologne at Bonn. The brothers obtained several benefits, including again Greifenstein. Louis ‘the Bavarian’, however, gave the lordship Greifenstein as a fief to Count Godefroy of Sayn – an opponent of the counts of Nassau.

After his brother John died in the Battle of Hermannstein near Wetzlar in 1328, Henry inherited all John's possessions (the County of Nassau-Dillenburg) because his other brother Emicho renounced his share of the inheritance.

In 1336, Henry's sons Otto and Henry signed a distribution treaty for their father's county. In 1339, however, the youngest son Henry married against the will of his father and brother. It came to battle between the two brothers. Otto entered into an alliance with Landgrave Herman I of Hesse against his brother Henry. A reconciliation could be achieved through the mediation of the counts Gerlach I of Nassau and Dirk III of Loon-Heinsberg. A new distribution treaty followed in 1341.

At the end of his life, Henry was embroiled in a controversy with Reinhard of Westerburg about the lordship rights in the Westerwald, in which Henry was victorious. After that he partially left the government to his eldest son Otto. The last known activity of Henry is when he reached a comparison with Archbishop Walram of Cologne over the joint rule over Siegen, in the summer of 1343. Henry was succeeded by his sons Otto and Henry in accordance with the distribution treaty of 1341.

== Marriage and children ==
Henry married before 1302 to Adelaide of Heinsberg and Blankenburg († after 21 May 1343), a daughter of Lord Dirk II of Heinsberg and Blankenburg and Johanna of Leuven (a granddaughter of Duke Henry I of Brabant). ‘Aleydis uxor… Henrici comitis de Nassouwia’ renounced the legacy of ‘felicis recordationis … Walrami domini quondam de Blanckenberch fratris nostri’ in favor of ‘nostrum consanguineum … Theodericum dominum de Heymsbergh et de Blamckenberch militem filium quondam domini Godefridi fratris nostri’, with the permission of ‘domini Henrici nostri mariti comitis prelibati nec non Ottonis militis primogeniti ac Henrici prepositi Spirensis nostrorum filiorum’, in a charter dated 8 March 1333.

From this marriage were born:

1. Agnes (died 29 October 1316/18), married about 1314 to Lord Gerlach II of Isenburg-Limburg (died 2 April 1355).
2. Otto (c. 1305 – December 1350/January 1351), succeeded his father as count of Nassau-Siegen.
3. Henry (c. 1307 – 24 February 1378 (1380?)), succeeded his father as count of Nassau-Beilstein.

== Sources ==
- This article was translated from the corresponding Dutch Wikipedia article on 2019-10-19.
- Becker, E. (1983). Schloss und Stadt Dillenburg. Ein Gang durch ihre Geschichte in Mittelalter und Neuzeit. Zur Gedenkfeier aus Anlaß der Verleihung der Stadtrechte am 20. September 1344 herausgegeben (in German) (Neuauflage ed.). Dillenburg: Der Magistrat der Stadt Dillenburg.
- Dek, Dr. A.W.E. (1970). Genealogie van het Vorstenhuis Nassau (in Dutch). Zaltbommel: Europese Bibliotheek. OCLC 27365371.
- Götze, Ludwig (1877). Emich I. in: Allgemeine Deutsche Biographie Band 6, Leipzig: Duncker & Humblot, p. 80.
- Huberty, Michel; Alain Giraud; F. & B. Magdelaine (1981). l’Allemagne Dynastique. Tome III Brunswick-Nassau-Schwarzbourg (in French). Le Perreux: Alain Giraud.
- Joachim, Ernst (1880). Heinrich, Graf von Nassau-Siegen, in: Allgemeine Deutsche Biographie Band 11 (in German), Leipzig: Duncker & Humblot, p. 548-549.
- Lück, Alfred (1981). Siegerland und Nederland (in German) (2. Auflage ed.). Siegen: Siegerländer Heimatverein e.V.
- Trautz, Fritz (1969). Heinrich I., Graf von Nassau-Dillenburg, in: Neue Deutsche Biographie Band 8 (in German), Berlin: Duncker & Humblot, ISBN 3-428-00189-3, p. 374.
- Vorsterman van Oyen, A.A. (1882). Het vorstenhuis Oranje-Nassau. Van de vroegste tijden tot heden (in Dutch). Leiden & Utrecht: A.W. Sijthoff & J.L. Beijers.
- Wagner, Jacob (1863). Die Regentenfamilie von Nassau-Hadamar. Geschichte des Fürstenthums Hadamar. Erster Band (in German) (Zweite Auflage ed.). Vienna: Mechitharisten-Congregations-Buchhandlung. p. 38.
- Wagner, P. (1902). Die Erwerbung der Herborner Mark durch die Grafen von Nassau, in: Annalen des Vereins für Nassauische Altertumskunde und Geschichtsforschung 32, Band 1901 (in German), Wiesbaden: Rud. Bechtold & Co, p. 26-44.

Preceded by Otto I	Count of Nassau; 1289/90-1303	Succeeded by –
Preceded by –	Count of Nassau-Siegen; 1303-1343	Succeeded by Otto II
