= Agnes of Leiningen =

- Died: after December 1299
- Noble family: House of Leiningen
- Spouse: Otto I, Count of Nassau
- Issue: Henry; Matilda; Emicho; Otto; John; Gertrudis
- Father: Emich IV, Count of Leiningen
- Mother: Elisabeth

Agnes of Leiningen (German: Agnes von Leiningen; died after December 1299) was a Countess of Nassau by marriage to Otto I, Count of Nassau. She was probably Regent of the County of Nassau for some time for her youngest son after the death of her spouse in 1289/1290.

== Biography ==
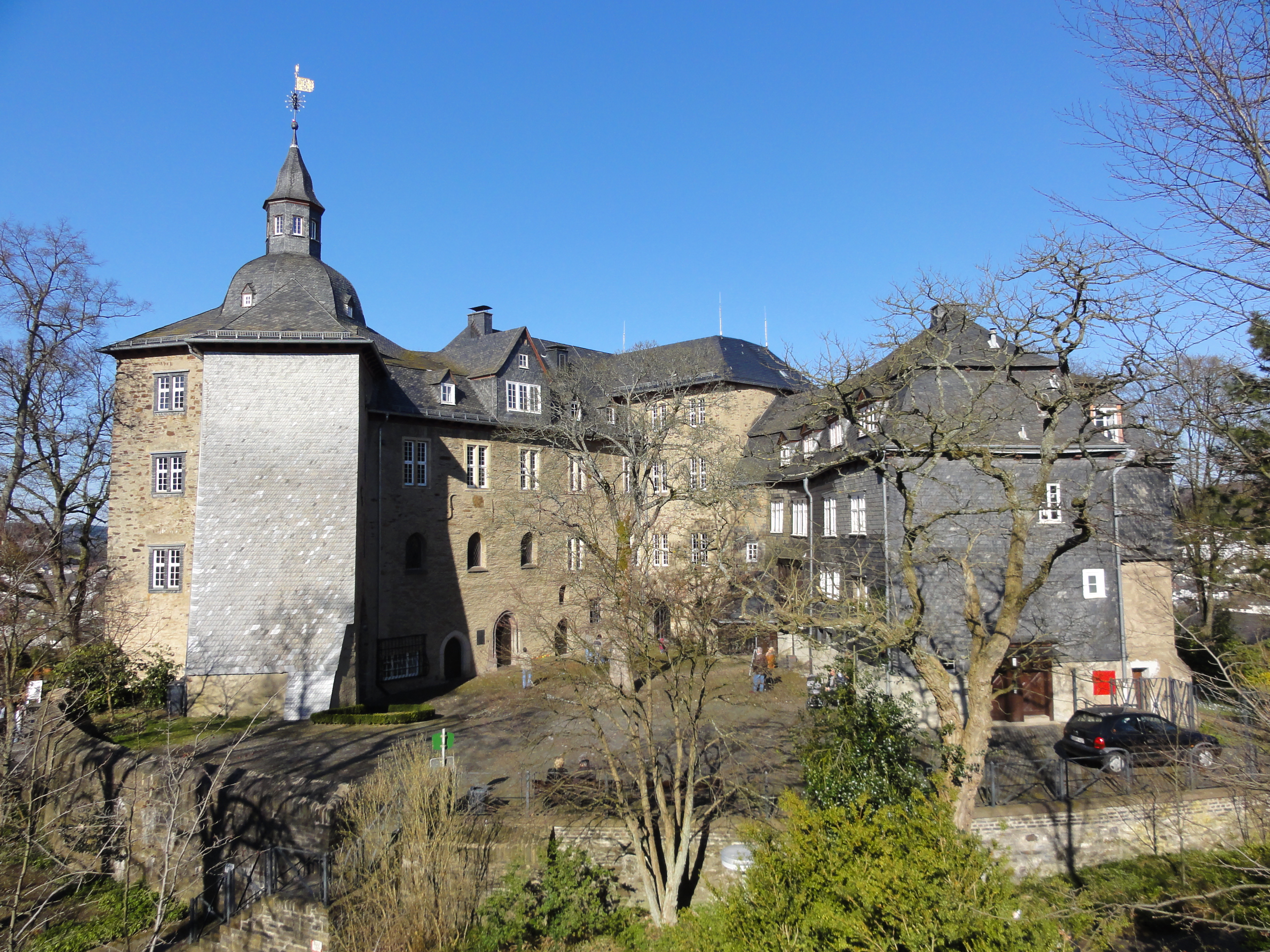
Siegen Castle

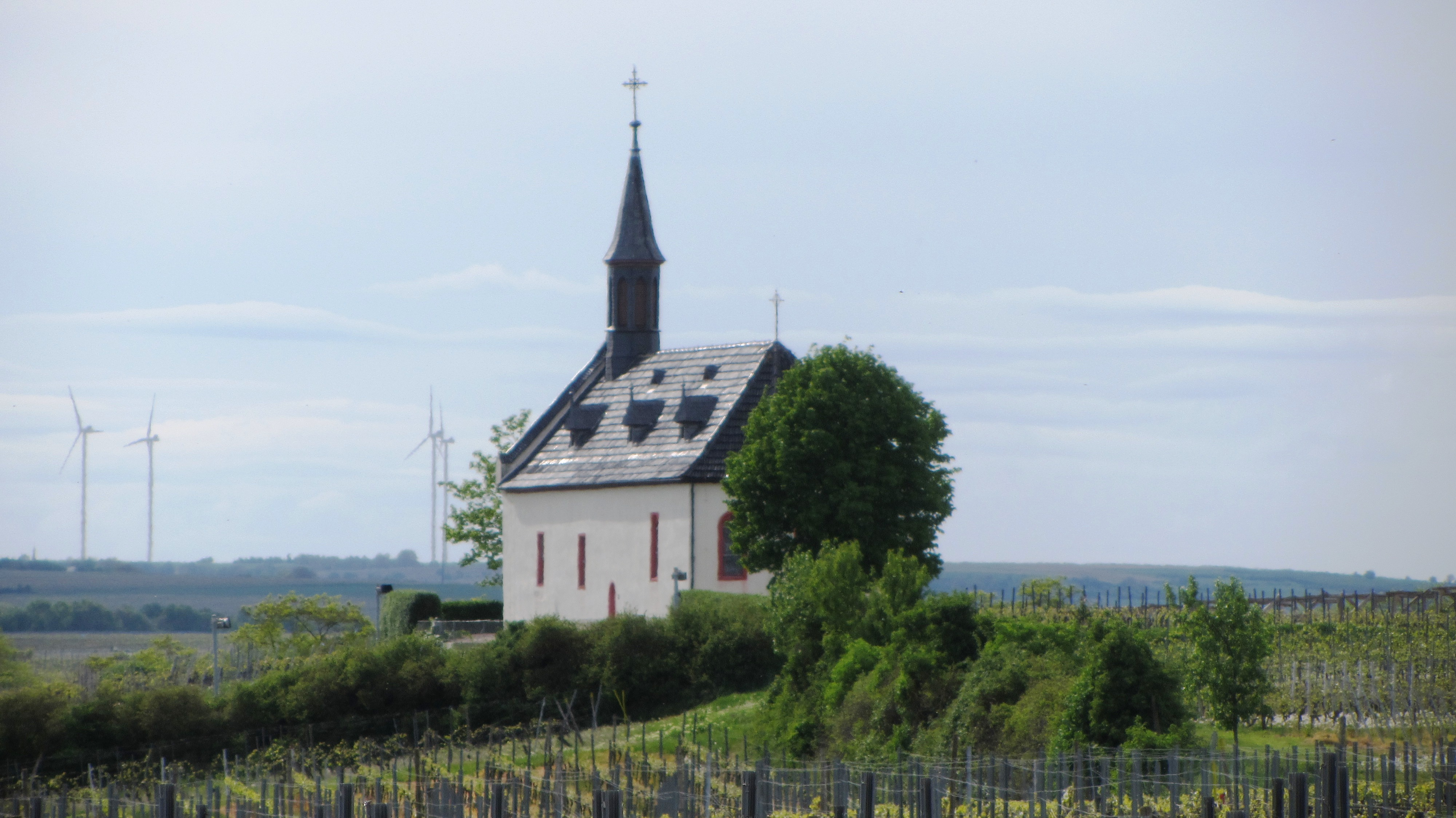
Klausenberg Chapel

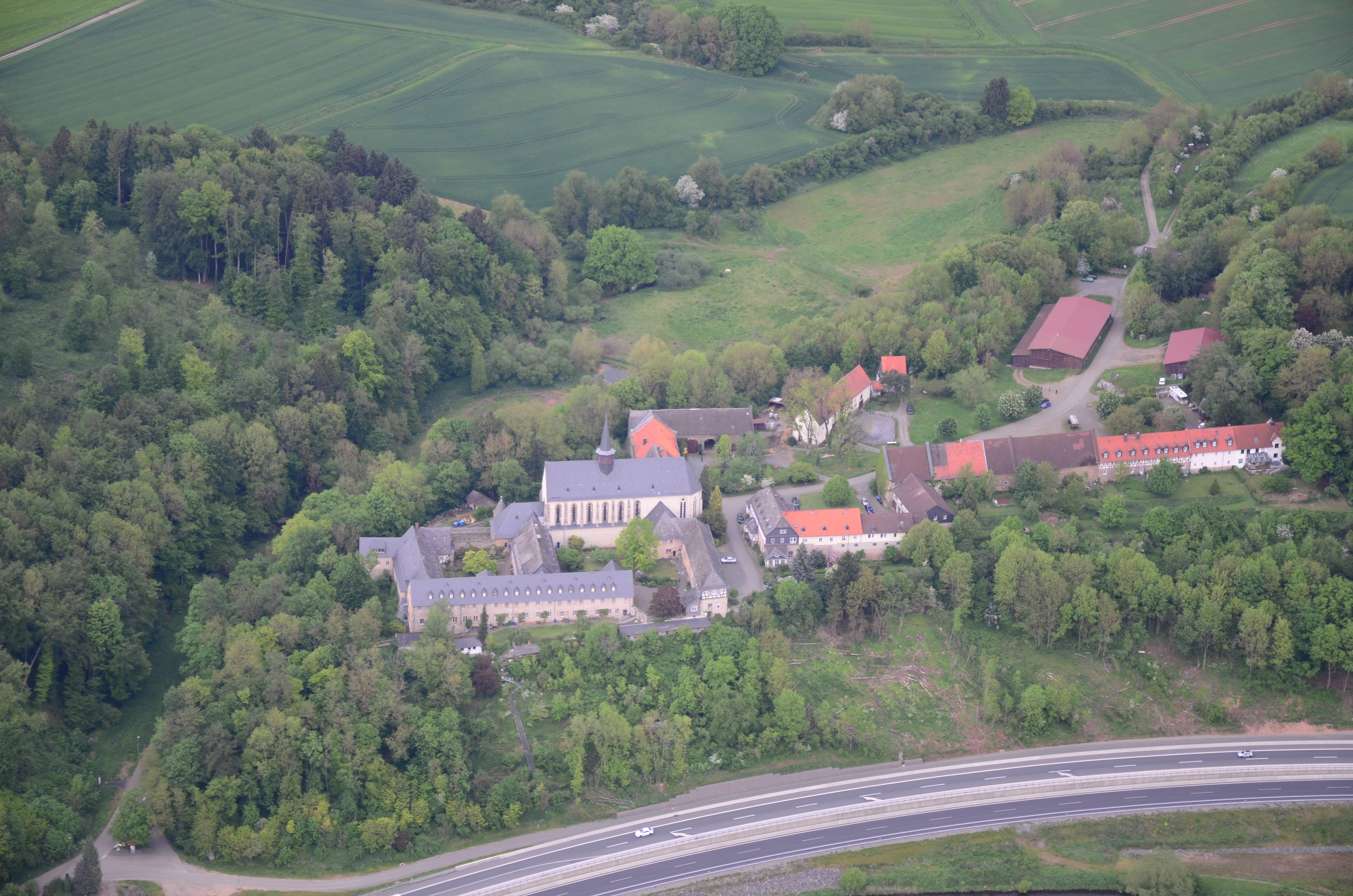
Altenberg Abbey

Agnes was a daughter of Count Emich IV of Leiningen and his wife Elisabeth. She married before 1270 Count Otto I of Nassau (died between 3 May 1289 and 19 March 1290). Her husband had divided the County of Nassau with his elder brother Walram II on 16 December 1255, on which occasion Otto had obtained the area north of the river Lahn, containing, among others, Siegen, Dillenburg, Herborn, Tringenstein, Neukirch and Emmerichenhain.

"Ottho comes de Nassawen... cum uxore nostra Agnete nec non Henrico nostro primogenito" ("Otto Count of Nassau... with our wife Agnes and Henry our firstborn son") confirmed the gift of goods "in Hasilbach et Aldindorph" to the church in "Aldenburg" (sic, for Altenberg Abbey) made by "matrem nostram Methildim comitissam bone mem... cum sorore nostra Katherina ibidem locata" ("our mother the Countess Matilda of blessed memory... and our sister Catherine located in the same place") by charter dated 3 May 1289. This is the last mention of Otto: in a charter dated 19 March 1290 he is mentioned as deceased.

Agnes ruled with her sons after the death of her husband. That can only mean that she acted as regent for her younger sons, the eldest two being of age at the death of their father. Nothing else is known about her regency.

On 13 April 1298 Agnes obtained permission from Bishop Emich I of Worms to found a monastery in Abenheim (today a part of the city of Worms). The current Klausenberg Chapel is probably the remains of that monastery. Agnes was a second cousin of the bishop. In 1299 she and her sons Henry and Emich confirmed the foundation in a charter.

"Agnes relicta quondam... dni Ottonis... comitis de Nassawe" ("Agnes widow of the former... lord Otto... Count of Nassau") gave property in "Herberin" to "Aldenburg" (i.e., Altenberg Abbey) "et... sororie [sic] nostre Dne Katerine et filie nostre Gertrudis" ("and ... [of] our sister the lady Catherine and our daughter Gertrude"), with the consent of "nostrorum filiorum.. Henrici, Emiconis militum, Ottonis et Iohannis clericorum" ("our sons, Henry and Emico, knights, and Otto and John, clerics"), in a charter dated December 1299. This is the last mention of Agnes in a charter. When she died is unknown. She had already died when her sons divided the County of Nassau after a long dispute in 1303. She was buried in Altenberg Abbey.

== Issue ==
From her union with Otto I of Nassau came the following children:

1. Henry (c. 1270 – between 13 July and 14 August 1343), succeeded his father to become Count of Nassau-Siegen in 1303.
2. Matilda (died before 28 October 1319), married around 1289 Gerhard of Schöneck (died 1317).
3. Emicho (died 7 June 1334), succeeded his father to become Count of Nassau-Hadamar in 1303.
4. Otto (died 3 September 1302), was canon at Worms in 1294.
5. John (died Hermannstein, 10 August 1328), succeeded his father to become Count of Nassau-Dillenburg in 1303.
6. Gertrudis (died 19 September 1359), was abbess of Altenberg Abbey, a Premonstratensian nunnery near Wetzlar.

== Sources ==
- This article was translated from the corresponding Dutch Wikipedia article, as of 2019-09-08.
- Ausfeld, Eduard (1887). "Otto I., Graf von Nassau" [Otto I, Count of Nassau]. Allgemeine Deutsche Biographie [Universal German Biography] (in German). Vol. Band 24. Leipzig: Duncker & Humblot. p. 707.
- Becker, E. (1983) [1950]. Schloss und Stadt Dillenburg. Ein Gang durch ihre Geschichte in Mittelalter und Neuzeit. Zur Gedenkfeier aus Anlaß der Verleihung der Stadtrechte am 20. September 1344 herausgegeben [Castle and City Dillenburg. A Journey through their History in Medieval and Modern Times. Published to celebrate the grant of Town Privileges on 20 September 1344] (in German) (2nd ed.). Dillenburg: Der Magistrat der Stadt Dillenburg.
- Dek, A.W.E. (1970). Genealogie van het Vorstenhuis Nassau [Genealogy of the Royal House of Nassau] (in Dutch). Zaltbommel: Europese Bibliotheek. OCLC 27365371.
- Huberty, Michel; Giraud, Alain; Magdelaine, F. & B. (1981). l'Allemagne Dynastique. Tome III Brunswick-Nassau-Schwarzbourg [German Dynasties. Volume III Brunswick-Nassau-Schwarzburg] (in French). Le Perreux: Alain Giraud.
- Lück, Alfred (1981) [1967]. Siegerland und Nederland [Siegerland and The Netherlands] (in German) (2nd ed.). Siegen: Siegerländer Heimatverein e.V.
- Vorsterman van Oyen, A.A. (1882). Het vorstenhuis Oranje-Nassau. Van de vroegste tijden tot heden [The Royal House of Orange-Nassau. From the earliest days until the present] (in Dutch). Leiden & Utrecht: A.W. Sijthoff & J.L. Beijers.
