= Otto I of Nassau =

German noble (1224–1289/90)

Otto I, Count of Nassau
- Born: 1224
- Died: between 3 May 1289 and 19 March 1290
- Noble family: House of Nassau
- Spouse: Agnes of Leiningen
- Issue: Henry; Matilda; Emicho; Otto; John; Gertrudis; Henry of Nassau (illegitimate)
- Father: Henry II of Nassau
- Mother: Matilda of Guelders and Zutphen

Otto I of Nassau (German: Otto I. von Nassau; born in 1224 and died between 3 May 1289 and 19 March 1290) was Count of Nassau and is the ancestor of the Ottonian branch of the House of Nassau.

== Biography ==
Coat of arms of the Counts of Nassau from the Ottonian branch

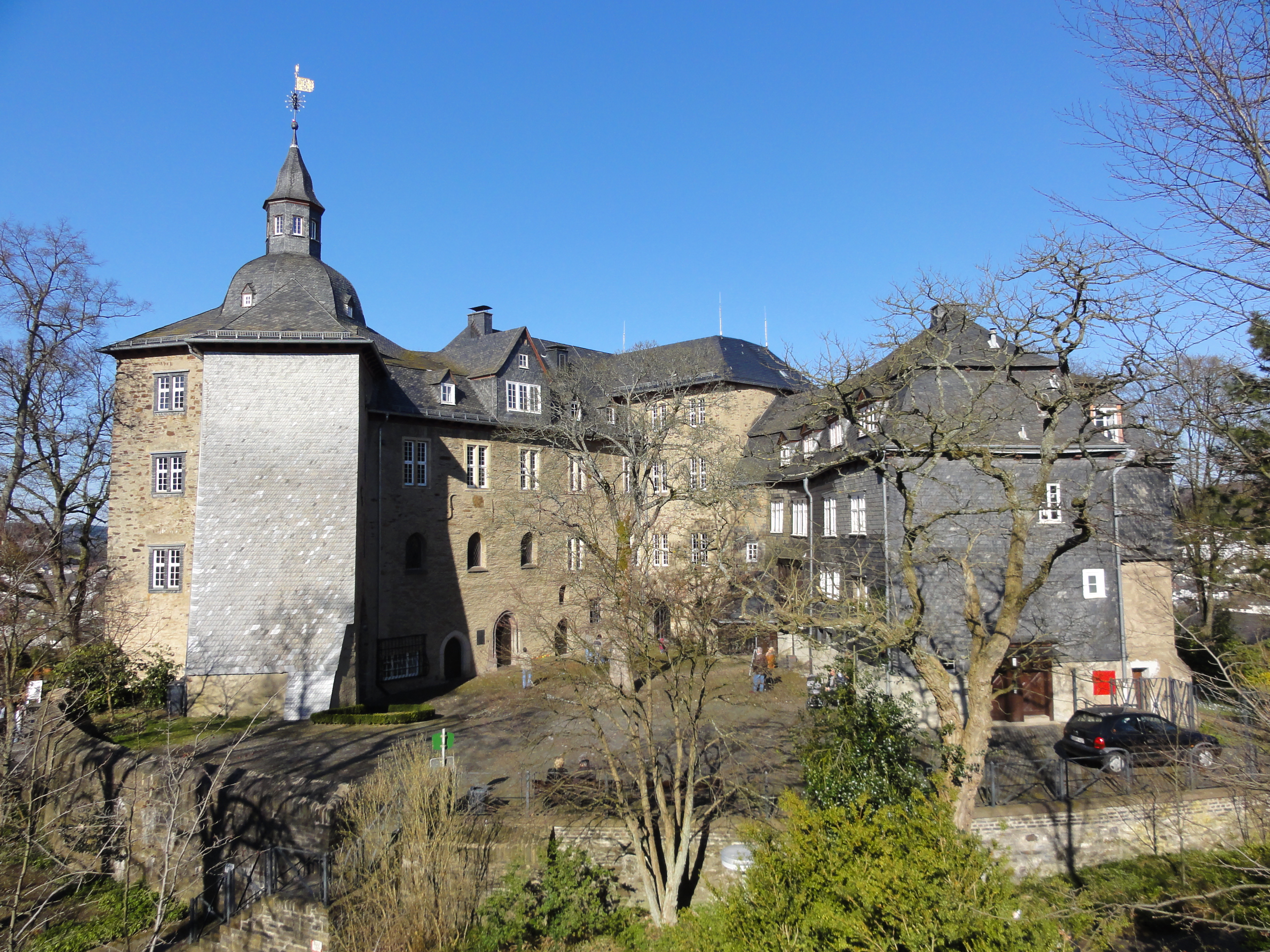
Siegen Castle

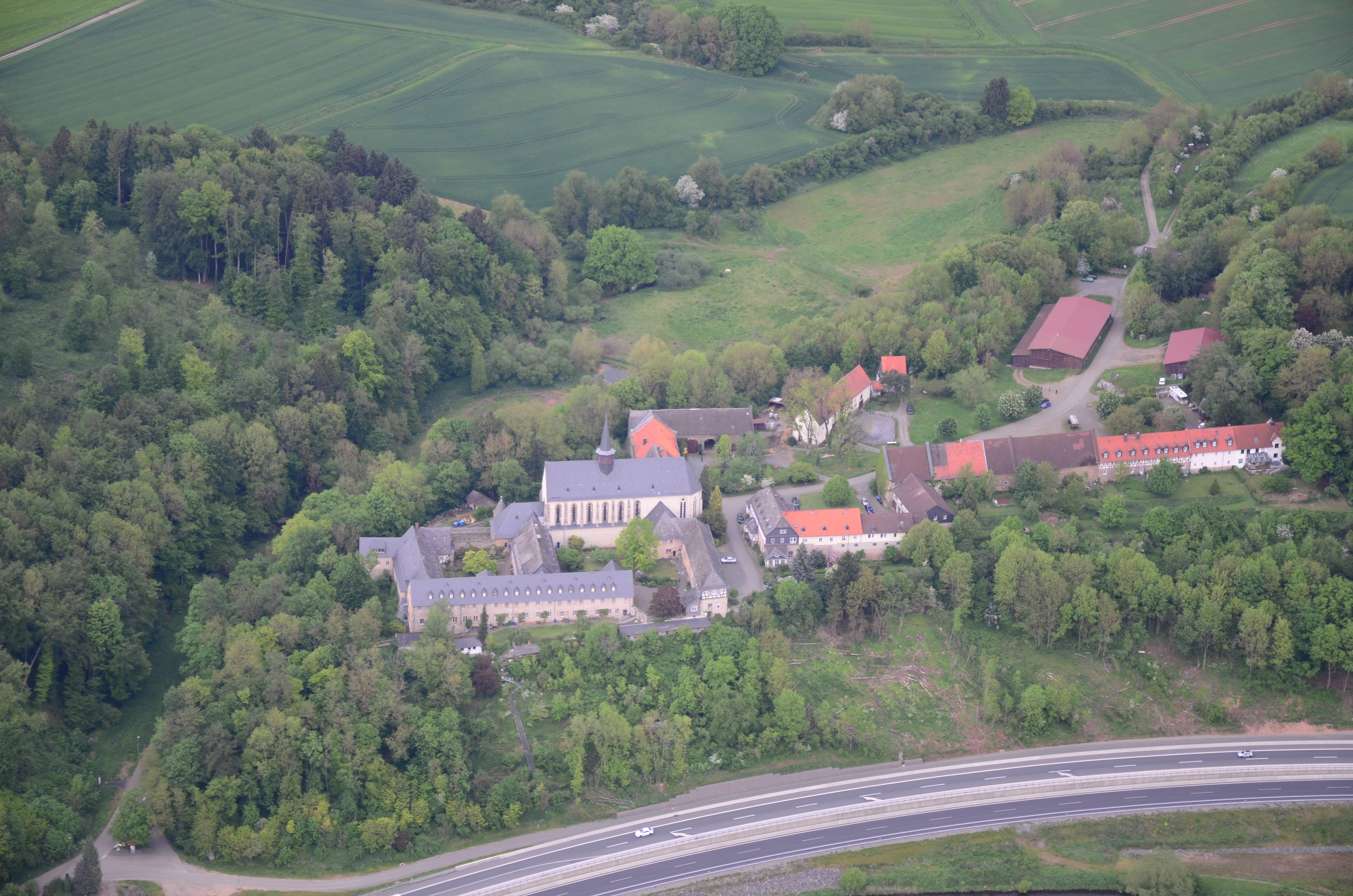
Altenberg Abbey

Otto was the third son of Count Henry II of Nassau and Matilda of Guelders and Zutphen, the youngest daughter of Count Otto I of Guelders and Zutphen and Richardis of Bavaria (herself daughter of Otto I Wittelsbach, Duke of Bavaria). Otto is first mentioned in a charter from 1247.

Otto succeeded his father before 1251, together with his brother Walram II. They received town privileges for Herborn from the German King William in 1251.

Walram and Otto divided their county on 16 December 1255 with the river Lahn as border. The division treaty is nowadays known as the Prima divisio. The area north of the Lahn: the lordships Siegen, Dillenburg, Herborn, Tringenstein, Neukirch and Emmerichenhain, a part of the Kalenberger Zent (Amt Kalenberg), as well as Dietkirchen and (Bad) Ems, was assigned to Otto. Nassau Castle and dependencies (Dreiherrische), the Ämter Miehlen and Schönau (Schönau Abbey near Strüth über Nastätten) as well as the Vierherrengericht, Laurenburg Castle, the Esterau (which was jointly owned with the counts of Diez) and the fiefs in Hesse remained jointly owned.

Protecting and enforcing his rights in his country was not always easy for Otto, especially at a time when the power of the supreme patron in the empire had sunk deeply. Disputes with the lords of Westerburg and the counts of Sayn about prerogatives in the Westerwald, and with the lords of Greifenstein and the lords of Dernbach about executive powers, often led to feuds and struggles. The details of the course of these feuds are unknown. In his struggles with the Archbishop of Trier, Otto lost the Vogtei of Koblenz and of Ems.

Otto's relationship with Siegfried II of Westerburg, the Archbishop of Cologne, also remains unclear. Otto made a covenant with various lords in Westphalia on 8 April 1277 to wage war against the archbishop. But Otto was an ally of the archbishop in the War of the Limburg Succession.

Otto's attempt to reduce his father's rich gifts to the Teutonic Order, or at least not to increase them in accordance with the wishes of the Order, ensured that he was designated as a robber of the goods of the order in 1285, was excommunicated, and his county was put under interdict, until the dispute was settled the following year.

Otto founded the chapel in Feldbach before 1287. ʻOttho comes de Nassawen … cum uxore nostra Agnete nec non Henrico nostro primogenitoʼ confirmed the donation of ʻbonorum in Hasilbach et Aldindorphʼ to the church in Aldenburg (read: Altenberg Abbey) made by ʻmatrem nostram Methildim comitissam bone mem … cum sorore nostra Katherina ibidem locataʼ by charter dated 3 May 1289. This is the last mention of Otto, in a charter dated 19 March 1290, he is mentioned as deceased. He was buried in Altenberg Abbey. He was succeeded by his sons Henry, Emicho and John.

== Marriage and children ==
Otto married before 1270 to Agnes of Leiningen († after December 1299), a daughter of Count Emich IV of Leiningen and Elisabeth. Agnes was buried in Altenberg Abbey.
From this union came the following children:

1. Henry (c. 1270 – between 13 July and 14 August 1343), succeeded his father, became Count of Nassau-Siegen in 1303.
2. Matilda (died before 28 October 1319), married around 1289 to Gerhard of Schöneck († 1317).
3. Emicho (died 7 June 1334), succeeded his father, became Count of Nassau-Hadamar in 1303.
4. Otto (died 3 September 1302), was canon at Worms in 1294.
5. John (died Hermannstein, 10 August 1328), succeeded his father, became Count of Nassau-Dillenburg in 1303.
6. Gertrudis (died 19 September 1359), was Abbess of Altenberg Abbey.

Otto also had an illegitimate son:

1. Henry of Nassau (died before 1314), who was Schultheiß. This Henry had a son:
  1. Arnold of Nassau, who is mentioned in a charter from 1314.

== Sources ==
- Ausfeld, Eduard (1887). "Otto I., Graf von Nassau" [Otto I, Count of Nassau]. Allgemeine Deutsche Biographie [Universal German Biography] (in German). Vol. Band 24. Leipzig: Duncker & Humblot. p. 707.
- Becker, E. (1983) [1950]. Schloss und Stadt Dillenburg. Ein Gang durch ihre Geschichte in Mittelalter und Neuzeit. Zur Gedenkfeier aus Anlaß der Verleihung der Stadtrechte am 20. September 1344 herausgegeben [Castle and City Dillenburg. A Journey through their History in Medieval and Modern Times. Published to celebrate the grant of Town Privileges on 20 September 1344] (in German) (2nd ed.). Dillenburg: Der Magistrat der Stadt Dillenburg.
- Dek, A.W.E. (1970). Genealogie van het Vorstenhuis Nassau [Genealogy of the Royal House of Nassau] (in Dutch). Zaltbommel: Europese Bibliotheek. OCLC 27365371.
- Huberty, Michel; Giraud, Alain; Magdelaine, F. & B. (1981). l'Allemagne Dynastique. Tome III Brunswick-Nassau-Schwarzbourg [German Dynasties. Volume III Brunswick-Nassau-Schwarzburg] (in French). Le Perreux: Alain Giraud.
- Lück, Alfred (1981) [1967]. Siegerland und Nederland [Siegerland and The Netherlands] (in German) (2nd ed.). Siegen: Siegerländer Heimatverein e.V.
- Vorsterman van Oyen, A.A. (1882). Het vorstenhuis Oranje-Nassau. Van de vroegste tijden tot heden [The Royal House of Orange-Nassau. From the earliest days until the present] (in Dutch). Leiden & Utrecht: A.W. Sijthoff & J.L. Beijers.

German nobility
Preceded by Henry II	Count of Nassau before 1251–1289/90	Succeeded by Henry, Emico and John
