= John II of Nassau-Siegen =

German count (d. 1443)

John II with the Helmet, Count of Nassau-Siegen

Count of Nassau-Siegen; Count of Vianden; Count of half Diez
- Coat of arms
- Reign: 1416–1443 (Nassau-Siegen); 1417–1443 (Vianden); 1420–1443 (half Diez)
- Predecessor: John I (Nassau-Siegen); Elisabeth of Sponheim-Kreuznach (Vianden); Adolf I of Nassau-Siegen (Diez)
- Successor: John IV of Nassau-Siegen; Henry II of Nassau-Siegen
- Full name: John II with the Helmet, Count of Nassau-Siegen
- Native name: Johann II. mit der Haube Graf von Nassau-Siegen
- Born: Unknown
- Died: early May 1443; Dillenburg Castle
- Buried: Keppel Abbey
- Noble family: House of Nassau-Siegen
- Spouse: –
- Father: John I of Nassau-Siegen
- Mother: Margaret of the Mark

Count John II with the Helmet of Nassau-Siegen (Note: In many sources he is called John II of Nassau(-Dillenburg). His official title was Count of Nassau, but it is incorrect to refer to him as the only reigning Count of Nassau, because the County of Nassau was divided into Nassau-Beilstein, Nassau-Siegen, Nassau-Weilburg and Nassau-Wiesbaden-Idstein. John co-ruled the County of Nassau-Siegen, which is erroneously called Nassau-Dillenburg in many sources. See note 2.) (d. early May 1443), German: Johann II. mit der Haube Graf von Nassau-Siegen, succeeded, with his brothers, his father in 1416 as Count of Nassau-Siegen (Note: The County of Nassau-Siegen is erroneously called Nassau-Dillenburg in many sources. The county was not named after the small, unimportant city of Dillenburg, which did not even have a church at that time, but after the, for that time, large city of Siegen, the economic centre of the county and the counts' main residence. See Lück (1981), passim. It is also evident from the numbering of the reigning counts with the given name John. One John without regal number who ruled the County of Nassau-Dillenburg in the period 1303–1328, and eight counts by the name of John who ruled the County of Nassau-Siegen in the period 1362–1638.) (a part of the County of Nassau). With his brothers, he inherited the County of Vianden in 1417, and also inherited half of the County of Diez in 1420. He descended from the Ottonian Line of the House of Nassau.

== Biography ==
John was the second son of Count John I of Nassau-Siegen and Countess Margaret of the Mark. To distinguish him from his brother and brother's son of the same name, he was called the Elder (German: der Älteste, der Ältere) after his father's death. His most common epithet, however, was: with the Helmet (German: der Hubener, der Häubener, mit der Haube), which was caused by his bellicose life and the frequent use of the helmet associated with it. He inherited his father's belligerence, but meanwhile he lived in harmony with his brothers.

John was first documented as already an adult in 1401. There is no doubt that he had already taken part in the feuds in which his brother Adolf, as Count of Diez, was involved with Count Rupert the Bellicose of Nassau-Sonnenberg and the Rhenish cities. Apart from that, John had already distinguished himself valiantly in wars with Hesse and the Electorate of Mainz, when he loyally stood by his elder brother Adolf and, as long as the latter was alive, fought many important battles with him. John became formidable and unforgettable with his helmet and armour.

John and his brothers, Adolf, Engelbert and John the Younger, already agreed on a joint continuation of the government of the County of Nassau-Siegen, when their father would die, on 21 December 1409. Whichever of the brothers would be native or closest to his lands on the father's death should take possession of them in all brothers' name until a division would have taken place. Likewise, they promised each other, out of conviction of mutual advantages, not to inflict any violent advances on each other, and to allow the preferences of one and the other to apply, which had been established by older decrees. Whoever would take something for himself alone would be disinherited. All parental decrees favouring one brother over the other were declared null and void in advance. Adolf hereby tacitly renounced his right to the part of Nassau-Hadamar and the districts of Herborn, Haiger and Löhnberg, which he could have claimed in advance from the marriage contract with the heiress of the County of Diez. In accordance with this agreement, the brothers took over the government jointly after their father's death in 1416. (Note: Dek (1970), p. 66 and Vorsterman van Oyen (1882), p. 90 state that John co-ruled with his brother Adolf only.) However, the intended division did not take place: Adolf had no male offspring, John the Elder was not married, the younger of the same name was a clergyman; it was to be expected that a division would not last long. Together, the brothers bought back the other half of the city of Siegen from the Electorate of Cologne. (Note: Lück (1981), p. 23 states that their father exchanged the County of Arnsberg in 1381 for the other half of Siegen from the Electorate of Cologne.)

In association with the Electorate of Mainz, (Note: The then Archbishop-Elector of Mainz, John II, descended from the Walramian Line of the House of Nassau, and was therefore a distant relative of John with the Helmet.) John waged a lengthy war with Landgrave Herman II of Hesse during his father's lifetime around 1410, which was very damaging for both countries. The Hessian annalists give sad descriptions of it. The treaty concluded in 1410 for a two-year truce confirms this. After the end of this truce, there were new hostilities with Landgrave Louis I of Hesse, including a battle in the Rippach near Sinn, in which, according to Hessian tales, John lost his banner and many people, especially Paris Galgenholz, a born Hessian. John had used this extremely clever man, perhaps as notorious as his name sounds (his surname translated into English was Gallowswood), for reconnaissance and negotiation for a long time.

When Elisabeth of Sponheim-Kreuznach, Countess of Vianden, died without issue in 1417, the four brothers, grandsons of Adelaide of Vianden, Elisabeth's great-aunt, inherited the County of Vianden with the lordships of St. Vith, Bütgenbach, Dasburg and Grimbergen. (Note: Dek (1970), p. 67 states that only Engelbert I, the third of the brothers, inherited the County of Vianden together with St. Vith and Bütgenbach, and furthermore Grimbergen, Corroy, Frasnes and Londerzeel. Vorsterman van Oyen (1882), p. 91 first states that John II received the County of Vianden on 27 February 1420, but later on the same page that only Engelbert I inherited it with St. Vith, Bütgenbach, Grimbergen, Dasburg, etc.) When the actual transfer took place and in which year the brothers came into possession of the County of Vianden cannot be stated with certainty and reliability. It probably happened in 1420 or 1421, because it was in the latter year that John II was first named Count of Vianden in the Palatinate feudal charter of 27 February. A few years before taking possession of Vianden, Engelbert I had already come into possession of half the lordships of St. Vith and Bütgenbach. Vianden included 47 villages (with 583 taxable households in 1562). Apart from the city of St. Vith, St. Vith and Bütgenbach contained 51 villages with 814 taxable subjects, while Dasburg had 304 in 36 villages. The Counts of Vianden only partially owned the lordship of Grimbergen, and it could only partially be inherited by the House of Nassau.

After the death of the eldest brother Adolf in 1420, the three remaining brothers succeeded him, but they lost half of the County of Diez, (Note: "The other half came to the Count of Eppstein who had married Adolf's only daughter. Half of this half (i.e. ¼) passed to the counts of Katzenelnbogen (1479). Hesse inherited that in 1500.") as well as ¼ of Camberg in 1428. (Note: "The lords von Eppstein, already possessors of one half, then held ¾ of the Amt Camberg. One of these quarters passed to Katzenelnbogen, then, in 1479, to Hesse and returned to Nassau in 1557. The other two quarters came to the lords of Königstein, then to the Elector of Trier in 1564, and finally, in 1803, to Nassau, who thus again found itself in sole possession of the Amt.") On 2 July 1420, Engelbert I and Count Godfrey VII of Eppstein-Münzenberg, as the joint owners, transferred the County of Diez, which was an imperial fief, to Archbishop Otto of Trier, and received it back from him as a fief. On 28 October 1425, (Note: Dek (1970), p. 66 and Vorsterman van Oyen (1882), p. 91 state the date 1 August 1425.) the three remaining brothers established a kind of division: John the Elder was given Dillenburg Castle, Engelbert Herborn Castle, and John the Younger Haiger Castle as his Residenz. The eldest brother, as far as some sovereign rights were concerned, was given the County of Nassau and the Lordship of Hadamar; Engelbert received the County of Vianden in the same way, and John the Younger half of the County of Diez. All of them, however, remained in joint ownership of these territories. The revenues were collected jointly and distributed equally.

In 1427, (Note: Dek (1970), p. 66 and Vorsterman van Oyen (1882), p. 91 state the date 24 December 1427.) a new agreement was made for four years. Of the land on both sides of the Kalteiche (the later principalities of Nassau-Dillenburg and Nassau-Siegen), each brother was assigned a third and John the Younger was assigned Siegen Castle as his Residenz instead of Haiger Castle. This division, however, mainly concerned services and fines from the allotted places. Everything else remained in joint ownership. This joint government is particularly remarkable because of the addition it has gained, half the County of Diez and the County of Vianden with St. Vith, Bütgenbach, Dasburg and Grimbergen. After the death of John the Younger in 1430, before the end of the appointed years, the two remaining brothers jointly ruled their territories again, which continued until their deaths. However, Engelbert mostly stayed in the Dutch territories, while John administered mainly the German lands.

John was invested with the Duchy of Cleves and the County of Mark by Roman King Sigismund in 1422, but settled for financial compensation two years later. To settle the claims to Cleves and Mark, (Note: The Nassau brothers had claims to Cleves and Mark through their mother Margaret of the Mark.) which had already led to hostilities, Duke Adolf I of Cleves, compensated the Nassau brothers with 12,000 gold guilders, Tuesday after Egidien (Note: Egidien, Ägidiustag or St. Gilgentag is the day Saint Giles is commemorated, which is on 1 September.) 1424. In a later treaty of 1429 or 1439, they jointly ceded their rights to the heerlijkheden of Ravenstein, Herpen and Uden to the Counts of Virneburg for a sum of 21,000 gold guilders.

John was also able to the acquire the serfs in Siegerland, which had belonged to the extinct lords of Wildenburg and were fully secured against the rightful heirs, the lords of Hatzfeld; to renew the fiefs over Greifenstein; to get the confirmation of the fiefs of the Electorate of Trier; and to reach a settlement with the Electorate of Mainz after a feud over the part of the toll in Oberlahnstein.

In the last years of his life, which he lived to a high age, John seems to have taken little interest in the affairs of government, preferring to leave them to his nephews, the sons of Engelbert I. John died unmarried at Dillenburg Castle in early May 1443 (Note: Huberty, et al. (1981), p. 219 also states the year of death 1443. Dek (1970), p. 66 and Vorsterman van Oyen (1882), p. 91 state that John died in Dillenburg in May 1448. Considering the fact that John's successors divided their possessions on 22 February 1447, the year of death 1448 cannot be correct.) and was buried in Keppel Abbey near Hilchenbach. He was succeeded by his nephews John IV and Henry II of Nassau-Siegen, the sons of Engelbert I.

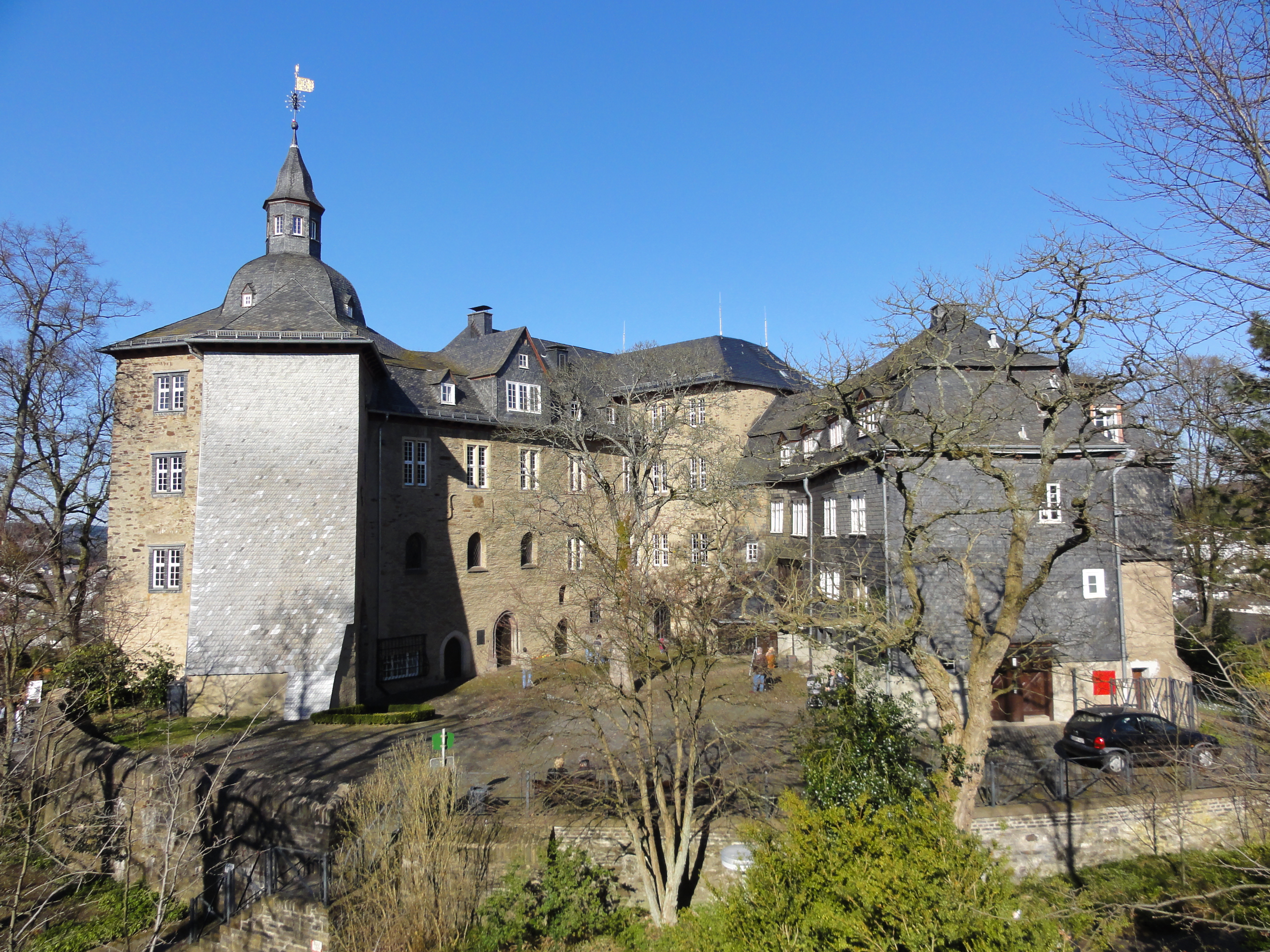
Siegen Castle, 2011.

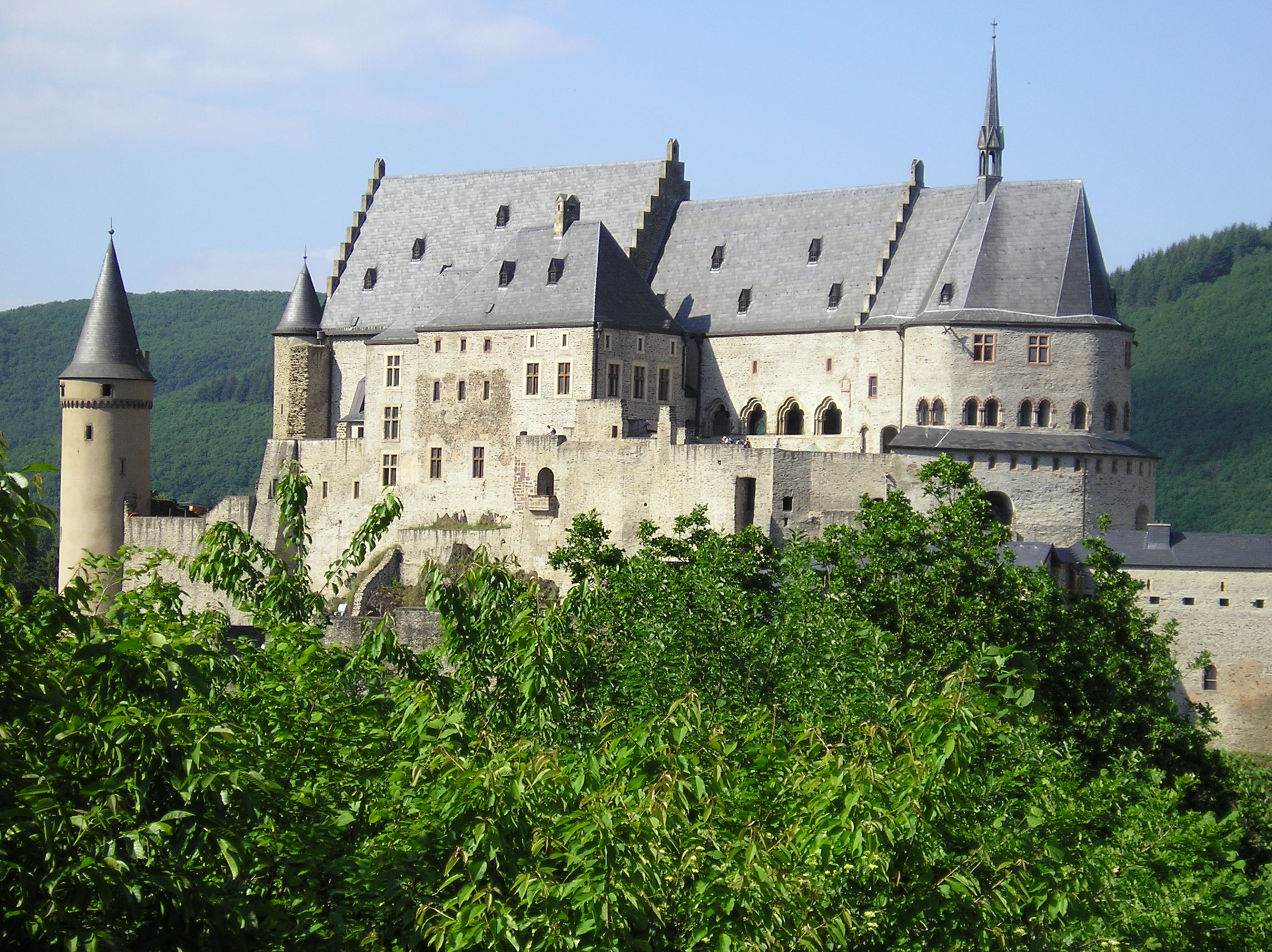
Vianden Castle. Photo: Vincent de Groot, 2004.

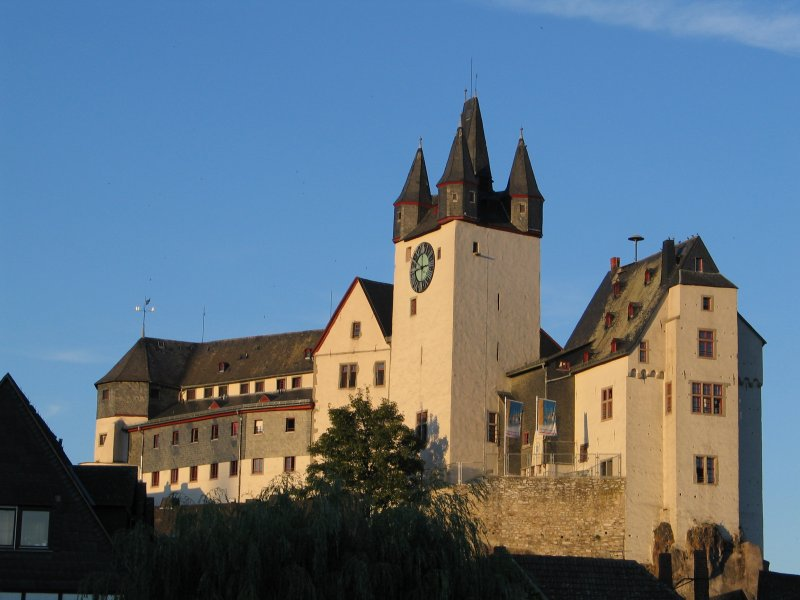
Diez Castle. Photo: Peter Klassen, 2006.

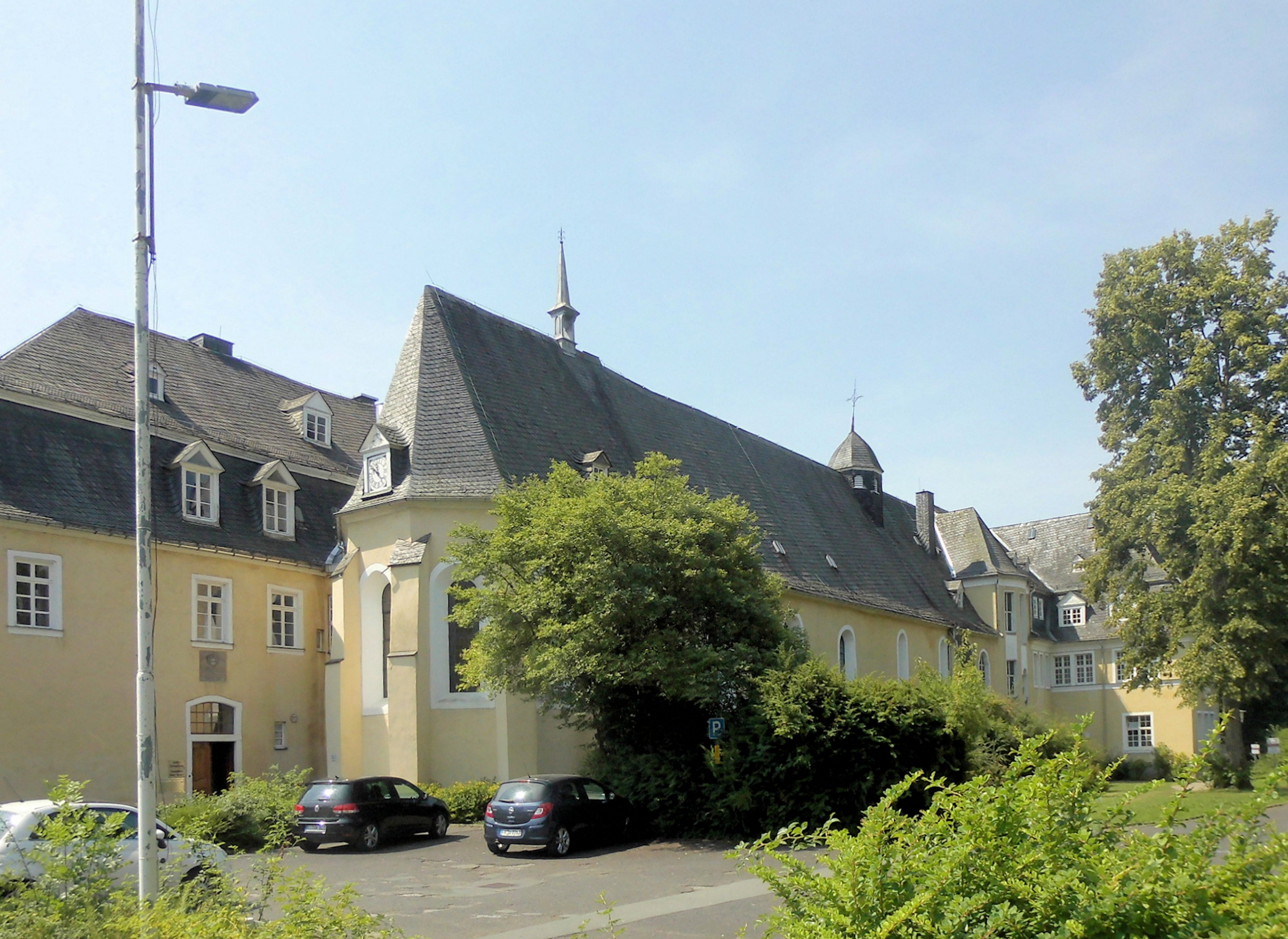
Keppel Abbey Church, 2018.

== Illegitimate children ==
John had two illegitimate children:

1. Adelheid von Nassau, who was a nun in Keppel Abbey in 1438.
2. Tilman von Nassau, who was mentioned in 1425 as student in Heidelberg, and in 1447 as student in Cologne. He obtained Wallenfels Castle as a fief in 1461 and a house in Herborn.

== Ancestors ==
Ancestors of Count John II of Nassau-Siegen
Great-great-grandparents	Otto I of Nassau (d. 1289/90) ⚭ before 1270; Agnes of Leiningen (d. after 1299)	Thierry II of Heinsberg and Blankenberg (d. 1303) ⚭ 1253; Joanna of Gaasbeek (d. 1291)	Godfrey I of Vianden (d. 1307/10) ⚭ 1278; Adelaide of Oudenaarde (d. 1305)	Louis of Arnsberg (d. 1312/13) ⚭ before 1276; Petronilla of Jülich (d. after 1299)	Engelbert I of the Mark (d. 1308) ⚭ 1273; Irmgard of Berg (d. 1294)	John of Arberg (d. 1281) ⚭ before 1273; Catherine of Jülich (d. after 1287)	Thierry VII of Cleves (1256/57–1305) ⚭ 1290; Margaret of Habsburg (d. c. 1333)	Reginald I of Guelders and Zutphen (c. 1255–1326) ⚭ 1286; Margaret of Flanders (d. after 1327)
Great-grandparents	Henry I of Nassau-Siegen (c. 1270–1343) ⚭ before 1302; Adelaide of Heinsberg and Blankenberg (d. after 1343)		Philip II of Vianden (d. 1315/16) ⚭ Adelaide of Arnsberg (?–?)		Engelbert II of the Mark (d. 1328) ⚭ 1299; Matilda of Arberg (d. 1367)		Thierry VIII of Cleves (1291–1347) ⚭ 1308; Margaret of Guelders and Zutphen (c. 1290–1331)	
Grandparents	Otto II of Nassau-Siegen (c. 1305–1350/51) ⚭ 1331; Adelaide of Vianden (d. 1376)				Adolf II of the Mark (d. 1347) ⚭ 1332; Margaret of Cleves (d. after 1348)			
Parents	John I of Nassau-Siegen (c. 1339–1416) ⚭ 1357; Margaret of the Mark (d. 1409)							

== Sources ==
- Becker, E. (1983) [1950]. Schloss und Stadt Dillenburg. Ein Gang durch ihre Geschichte in Mittelalter und Neuzeit. Zur Gedenkfeier aus Anlaß der Verleihung der Stadtrechte am 20. September 1344 herausgegeben (in German) (Neuauflage ed.). Dillenburg: Der Magistrat der Stadt Dillenburg.
- Dek, A.W.E. (1970). Genealogie van het Vorstenhuis Nassau (in Dutch). Zaltbommel: Europese Bibliotheek.
- Hoffmann, A.G., ed. (1842). "Johann II.". Allgemeine Encyklopädie der Wissenschaften und Künste. Zweite Section. H–N (in German). Vol. Einundzwanzigster Theil: Johann Infant von Castilien – Johann-Boniten. Leipzig: F.A. Brochhaus. p. 135.
- Huberty, Michel; Giraud, Alain & Magdelaine, F. & B. (1981). l'Allemagne Dynastique (in French). Vol. Tome III: Brunswick-Nassau-Schwarzbourg. Le Perreux: Alain Giraud. ISBN 2-901138-03-9.
- Lück, Alfred (1981) [1967]. Siegerland und Nederland (in German) (2nd ed.). Siegen: Siegerländer Heimatverein e.V.
- von Stramberg, Chr. (1865). Denkwürdiger und nützlicher Rheinischer Antiquarius, welcher die wichtigsten und angenehmsten geographischen historischen und politischen Merkwürdigkeiten des ganzen Rheinstroms, von seinem Ausflusse in das Meer bis zu seinem Ursprunge darstellt. Von einem Nachforscher in historischen Dingen. Mittelrhein. Der II. Abtheilung. 13. Band. Der Rheingau. Historisch und topografisch (in German). Vol. Vierter Band. Coblenz: Rud. Friedr. Hergt.
- Vorsterman van Oyen, A.A. (1882). Het vorstenhuis Oranje-Nassau. Van de vroegste tijden tot heden (in Dutch). Leiden & Utrecht: A.W. Sijthoff & J.L. Beijers.

John II of Nassau-Siegen House of Nassau-Siegen Born: ? Died: May 1443
Regnal titles
Preceded by John I	Count of Nassau-Siegen; 4 September 1416 – May 1443	Succeeded by John IV; Henry II
Preceded by Elisabeth of Sponheim-Kreuznach	Count of Vianden; 31 July 1417 – May 1443	Succeeded by John IV of Nassau-Siegen; Henry II of Nassau-Siegen
Preceded by Adolf I of Nassau-Siegen	Count of Diez; 12 June 1420 – May 1443	Succeeded by John IV of Nassau-Siegen; Henry II of Nassau-Siegen
