= John I of Nassau-Siegen =

German count (c. 1339–1416)

John I, Count of Nassau-Siegen

Count of Nassau-Siegen
- Coat of arms
- Reign: 1350/1351–1416
- Predecessor: Otto II
- Successor: Adolf I; John II with the Helmet; Engelbert I; John III the Younger
- Full name: John I, Count of Nassau-Siegen
- Native name: Johann I. Graf von Nassau-Siegen
- Born: c. 1339
- Died: 4 September 1416 (aged 76–77); Herborn Castle
- Buried: Keppel Abbey
- Noble family: House of Nassau-Siegen
- Spouse: Margaret of the Mark
- Issue Detail: Adolf I; John II with the Helmet; Engelbert I; Henry; John III the Younger
- Father: Otto II of Nassau-Siegen
- Mother: Adelaide of Vianden

Count John I of Nassau-Siegen (Note: In many sources he is called John I of Nassau(-Dillenburg). His official title was Count of Nassau, but it is incorrect to refer to him as the only reigning Count of Nassau, because the County of Nassau was divided into Nassau-Beilstein, Nassau-Hadamar, Nassau-Siegen, Nassau-Weilburg and Nassau-Wiesbaden-Idstein. John ruled the County of Nassau-Siegen, which is erroneously called Nassau-Dillenburg in many sources. See note 2.) (c. 1339 – 4 September 1416), German: Johann I. Graf von Nassau-Siegen, was since 1362 Count of Nassau-Siegen (Note: The County of Nassau-Siegen is erroneously called Nassau-Dillenburg in many sources. The county was not named after the small, unimportant city of Dillenburg, which did not even have a church at that time, but after the, for that time, large city of Siegen, the economic centre of the county and the counts' main residence. See Lück (1981), passim. It is also evident from the numbering of the reigning counts with the given name John. One John without regal number who ruled the County of Nassau-Dillenburg in the period 1303–1328, and eight counts by the name of John who ruled the County of Nassau-Siegen in the period 1362–1638.) (a part of the County of Nassau). He descended from the Ottonian Line of the House of Nassau.

John was involved in numerous feuds throughout his life. The chivalric spirit of that time created a multitude of unions and alliances. John was a co-founder or at least an active member of several of these alliances, always ready for quarrels and knightly combat. Through negotiations, and when necessary also through skilfully conducted feuds, he secured his country many kinds of benefits, for example income from old, hitherto little-used Rhine tolls. In this way, the courageous count not only kept his father's inheritance unbroken and even debt-free during difficult times and a long life, but also triumphed over his opponents, who wanted to shorten and challenge it, sometimes in the open field, sometimes before courts of arbitration.

During his long, mostly restless reign, he not only made lucrative acquisitions of various kinds, but also expanded the possessions of his house, most notable through the succession dispute over the County of Nassau-Hadamar. John amply compensated the losses his unfortunate father had inflicted by overcoming great obstacles.

== Biography ==
John was born c. 1339 (Note: Vorsterman van Oyen (1882), p. 90 and Joachim (1881), p. 250 state born c. 1340. von Stramberg (1865), p. 712 and Hoffmann (1842), p. 134 state born in 1339 or 1340.) as the eldest son of Count Otto II of Nassau-Siegen and Countess Adelaide of Vianden.

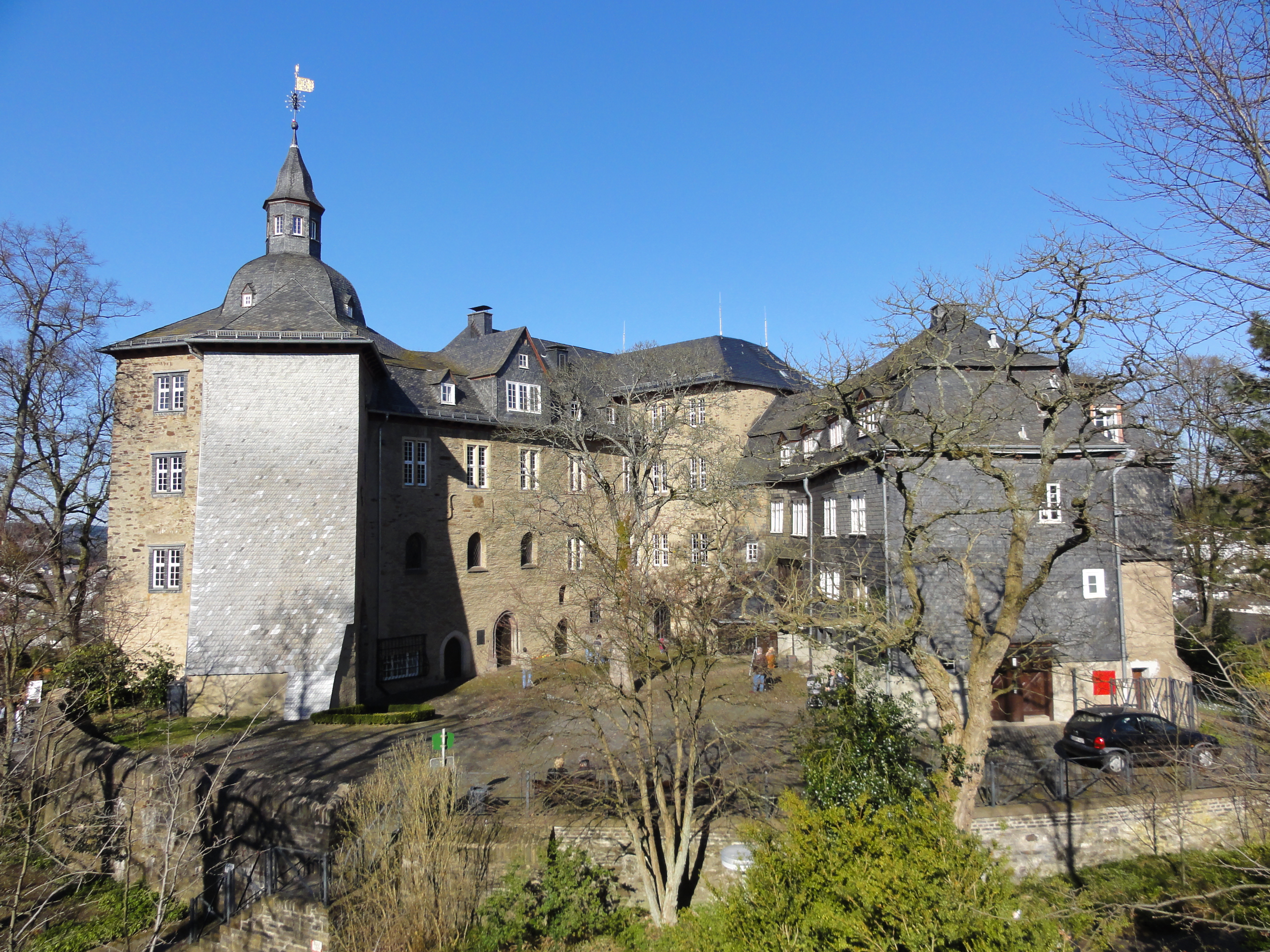
Siegen Castle, 2011.

When John's father was killed in action between 6 December 1350 and 25 January 1351, John succeeded him as Count of Nassau-Siegen. As John was still a minor, his mother assumed regency over the county. This clever and energetic woman, endeavoured to gradually settle the numerous feuds inherited by her and her son with the local noble families, the powerful lords of Bicken, Walderdorff and Haiger, although she herself did not disdain to take up the gauntlet forced upon her on one occasion or another. On the other hand, she also resolved many of the pledges entered into by her husband. In the underdeveloped County of Nassau-Siegen, where the local nobility thought they had a free hand, she kept the reins tight. She did have to pledge land to clear her husband's debts, and although ending her husband's numerous feuds was not without sacrifice, these agreements brought her the peace for undisturbed reconstruction. The unfinished feuds and frequent interference from the country's resident powerful nobility forced her to make new debts. In 1356, she was forced to conclude a protection alliance with Landgrave Henry II the Iron of Hesse, opening all Nassau castles to the landgrave, during John's minority.

In the district of Haiger, the noble family of the same name had been very powerful from old times. Under the favour of its feudal lords, it resisted the overlordship of the Counts of Nassau. John's minority seemed to be the most opportune time for it to shake off this yoke completely. Heiderich von Haiger's arrogance went so far that he allowed himself to commit abuses against the person of the young John. An open feud ensued, the ruinous consequences of which, as usual, affected the countryside and its inhabitants. Adelaide, however, did not lack courage and steadfastness to counter the insolence and violence of her enemies with vigour and to defend the rights of her son. There is no doubt that she benefited greatly from the support of her allies, Landgrave Henry II the Iron of Hesse and his son Otto the Younger. The conflict with sword and lance was followed by a legal dispute, before a settlement was concluded in 1357 by Count Thierry III of Looz, the chairman of the court, in a decision written in 63 articles, which is a most remarkable explanation of the customs and rights of that age. The pledge of the parish of Haiger and half of Ginsburg Castle was undone. It decided the struggle with the lords of Haiger for supremacy in the Mark Haiger in favour of the Nassaus. The lords of Haiger became vassals of the Nassaus. The beneficial consequences of peace and tranquillity became apparent in the next few years.

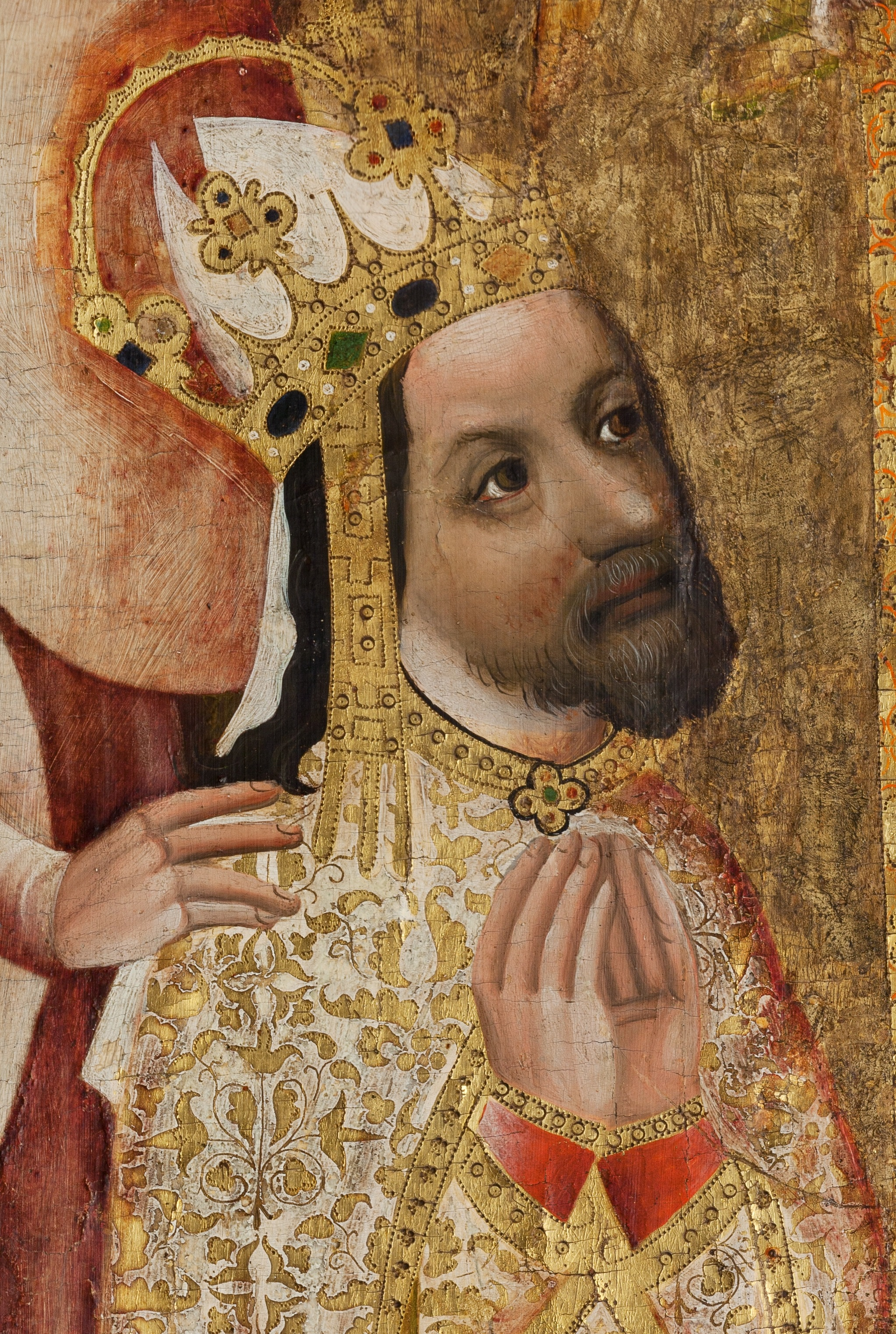
Emperor Charles IV. Detail from the Votive Panel of Jan Očko of Vlašim, before 1371. Convent of Saint Agnes, Prague.

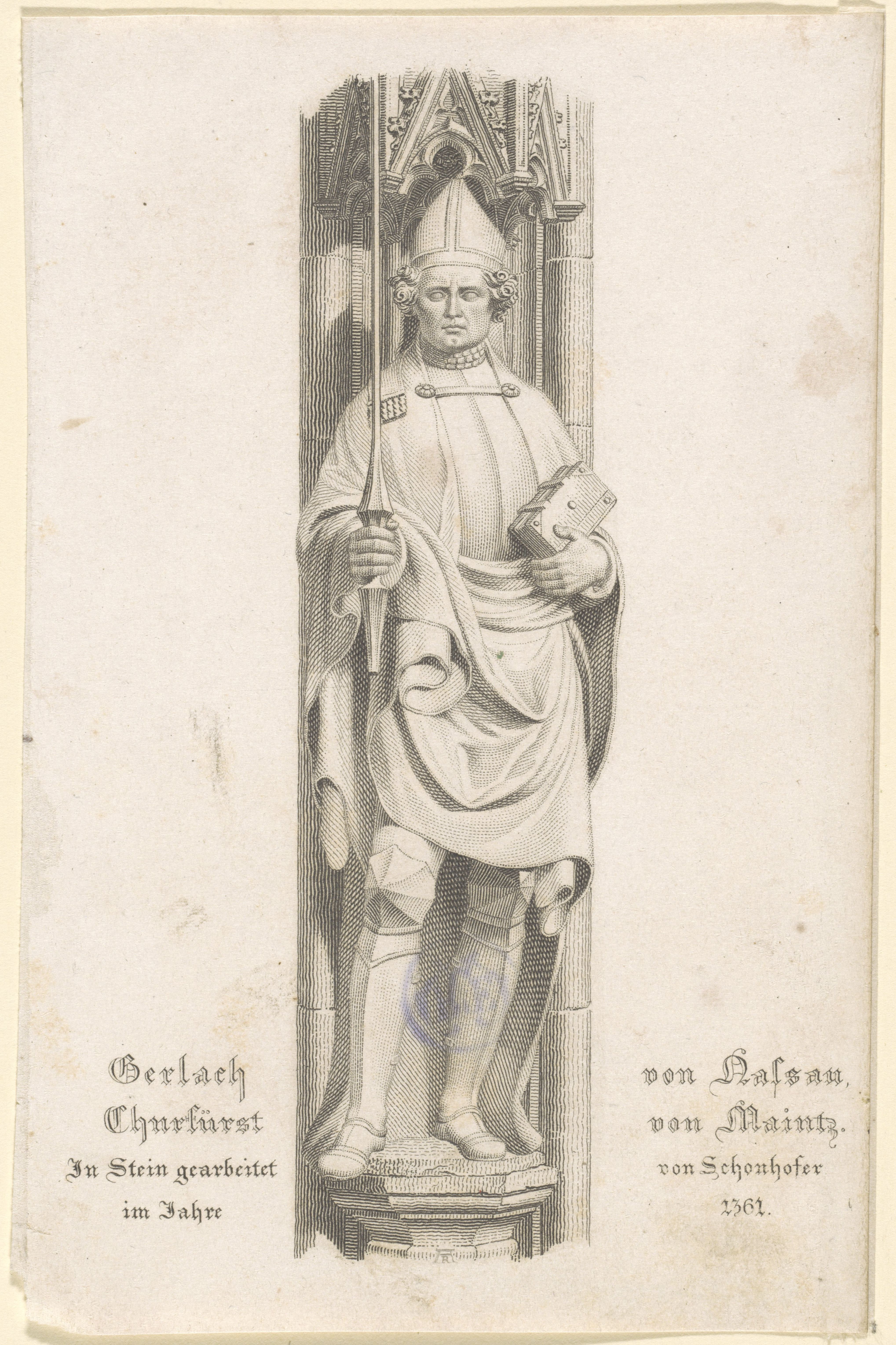
Gerlach of Nassau, Archbishop of Mainz. Anonymous engraving of a statue made by Schonhofer in 1361, 17th century. Rijksmuseum, Amsterdam.

From 1359 to 1362, Adelaide and John redeemed the most considerable pledges. Because of 3200 pounds Heller and 2000 shield guilders, which Holy Roman Emperor Charles IV owed the deceased Count Otto, he assigned 1 1/2 old large tornesel from some water or land tolls. Often to such grants this clause was added: 'when he may acquire it at a prince's or lord's tolls'. If an agreement was reached with the owner of the toll, the toll's duty was increased in proportion to the sum granted, which, of course, should only have been temporary in accordance with the intention, but which may have given rise to many a continuing increase in toll's duty that was detrimental to trade. Adelaide and her son, as it seems, sought satisfaction for the aforementioned debt of Emperor Charles IV to the toll of the Electorate of Mainz at Oberlahnstein, which was closest to them. In any case, they had even older claims on the Electorate of Mainz, probably dating back to Roman King Louis IV's time. As usual, a feud ensued. In the autumn of 1362, Archbishop Gerlach, (Note: Archbishop Gerlach of Mainz descended from the Walramian Line of the House of Nassau, and was therefore a distant cousin of Adelaide and her son John.) invaded Nassau-Siegen with 500 horsemen, each of whom, according to the custom of the time, were accompanied by a few armed footmen. The long known belligerent peasants of the Rheingau scorched, looted and devastated the county, but had to retreat across the Rhine when the floods came, to prevent being cut off. In December of the same year, Gerlach and John signed a peace treaty at Aschaffenburg. Gerlach promised to pay 3500 florins and to grant John a tornesel from the toll at Oberlahnstein until he would have drawn 2000 florins from it. Later, a new dispute arose over this toll, which was only settled in 1407 to the effect that John should be allowed a tornesel from the toll for life.

John took over the reign in 1362. He immediately started a feud with Godfrey of Heinsberg over John's claims to the Lordship of Heinsberg and Stadt Blankenberg, originating from the marriage of his grandfather Count Henry I of Nassau-Siegen to Lady Adelaide of Heinsberg and Blankenberg, which Godfrey had partly transferred to his brother-in-law, Duke William I of Jülich. The feud was eventually sufficiently resolved by the assurance of monetary payments in 1363 and 1374.

John joined the Sternerbund, a knights alliance. This alliance was founded following the death of Landgrave Otto the Younger of Hesse in 1366. As the only son of the old Landgrave Henry II the Iron, Otto had taken a most active part in the government for several years. Now Landgrave Henry appointed his brother's son Herman the Younger as co-regent and successor. Henry's grandson, Duke Otto I of Brunswick-Göttingen, who had also hoped for this succession, was very dissatisfied with his grandfather's choice. The Hessian nobility, who, like the nobility elsewhere, always knew how to profit from internal unrest, was largely averse to the new ruler because of the reforms introduced and the abolition of abuses that had crept in. Rarely did any of the neighbours remain on good terms with each other longer than during a joint feud against a third. In this case, Landgrave Henry was also exposed to the jealousy of most of his neighbours. In these circumstances, it was not difficult for Duke Otto to find a large number of participants in his dispute with his grandfather and his co-ruler. Count Godfrey VII of Ziegenhain presented himself as the leader of the allies. From the coat of arms of the County of Ziegenhain, the allies took the silver star as their field emblem, from which they received the name Sterners. The allies included, among others, the counts Engelbert III of the Mark, Henry VI of Waldeck, Diether VIII and William II of Katzenelnbogen, the lords Ulrich IV of Hanau, of Epstein, and several of the nobility and lords of Westphalia, Hesse, Franconia, the Wetterau and by the Rhine. The inclination towards war of Count John I of Nassau-Siegen alone would have made this opportunity to satisfy it desirable to him. He had also been an enemy of Landgrave Henry from earlier years, and might now consider it the best time to avenge the damage that the Hessians had inflicted on the Siegerland in the Hatzfeld feud around 1360. Furthermore, Landgrave Henry had obtained the feudal lordship over Driedorf in 1348 and now, after the death of Count John of Nassau-Hadamar, took occasion from the idiocy of Count Emicho III of Nassau-Hadamar to treat this district as an open fief and to seize a part of it for himself. There was also a dispute between them about the Lordship of Itter of Nassau, a fief acquired by purchase by Hesse, and which John wanted to obtain as forfeited.

In another feud, against Lord John of Westerburg, John was captured with 44 horsemen near Obertiefenbach in 1370 and only released after paying a ransom of 10,000 guilders. Both parties remained at peace until 1408, when the renewal of hostilities interrupted the friendly understanding for a while. In 1371 John fought in the Battle of Baesweiler on the side of Duke William II of Jülich and Duke Edward of Guelders against Duke Wenceslaus I of Luxembourg and Duchess Joanne of Brabant. Meanwhile, the war with Hesse lasted until around 1373 and was conducted according to the custom of the time. The Sterners invaded Hesse several times, devastated and plundered as much as they could and then retreated with the booty to their castles. In all this, the first and main purpose of the Sternerbund was not achieved. Landgrave Herman remained in possession of the co-regency and was Landgrave Henry's only successor after his death. John achieved just as little of his original intention. The Sterners were unable to assert his right to Driedorf.

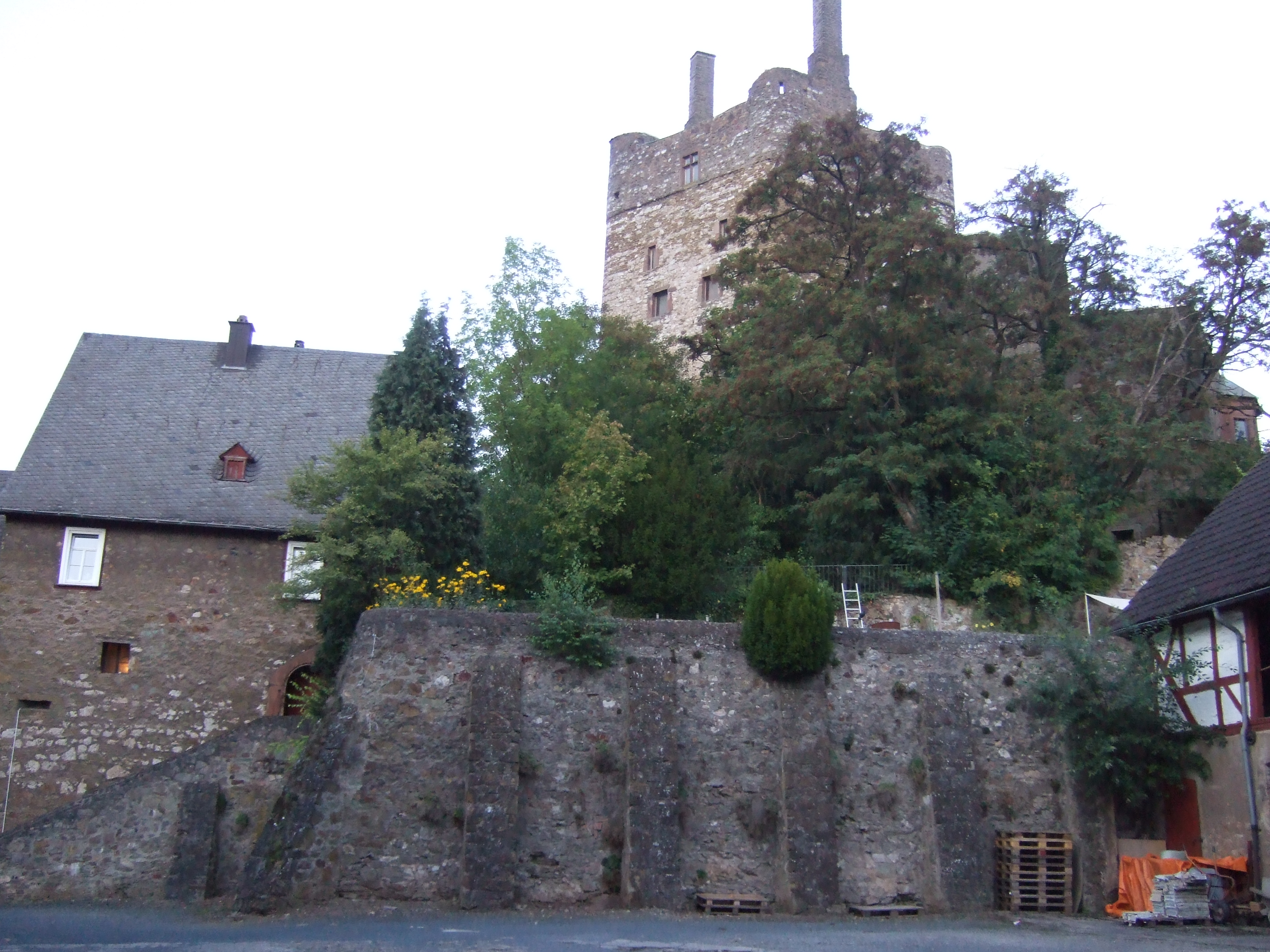
Hermannstein Castle. Photo: Manuel Funk, 2011.

In 1373, John brought about a new alliance against Hesse under the name: Bund der alten Minne (Alliance of the Old Love). It was actually aimed at the conquest of Driedorf, and John seems to have been the leader of the alliance. The members, mostly Sterners, now called themselves: Gesellen der alten Minne (Fellows of the Old Love). The Hessians were defeated by John at Wetzlar, who then plundered the districts of Hermannstein Castle, Giessen, Königsberg, Blankenstein, Biedenkopf, Caldern, Marburg, and others, and caused great damage to the landgrave everywhere. Perhaps it was a further consequence of this victory that John drove the Hessians out of Driedorf. The settlement of 1378 at least proves that he had regained possession of this castle and district, although there are no definite records of when this happened and how Driedorf was returned to Hesse after 1378. This much is certain: the hostilities against Landgrave Henry and his successors continued for several years after 1373. Anyone who had a dispute with Hesse could count on John's support. John entered into a special alliance with Count John of Solms in 1375 because of the dispute between the latter and Hesse over the Lordship of Lich. Finally, under the mediation of the Hoch- und Deutschmeister Johann von Hayn and the counts of Katzenelnbogen and Sponheim, a provisional settlement was reached in Friedberg in 1377. A further reconciliation, the conditions of which were not stated, was initiated by Duke Otto I of Brunswick-Göttingen, and also recognised in 1378 at a personal meeting of Herman and John in Frankfurt before counts Rupert of Nassau-Sonnenberg and Diether VIII of Katzenelnbogen as chosen arbitrators, that John should be left undisturbed in the castle of Driedorf and its appurtenances, that the fiefs of the lordship of Itter should be returned to him, that the castle built by Hesse at the River Dill, presumably at Hermannstein, should be dismantled, and that, contrary to custom, no toll should be taken from John's subjects there. Landgrave Herman, however, did not want to settle down with this decision, but nevertheless promised to give John a hearing before his knights and men on the matter of Driedorf and Itter. Whether this was done is unknown. At least this did not end the dispute. As early as 1379, John joined a new alliance against Hesse, which was established in the Wetterau under the name of the Gesellschaft mit dem Löwen (Society with the Lions). The hostilities continued for more than 30 years, but with several interruptions, especially during the alliance of 1390 against the common enemy, Count John III of Sayn-Wittgenstein, and although they ceased in 1411 by a treaty between Herman and John, they soon resumed under their sons. John also seems to have been a member of a Gesellschaft mit den Hörnern (Society with the Horns), which was also established around this time with the purpose of mutual defence and assistance.

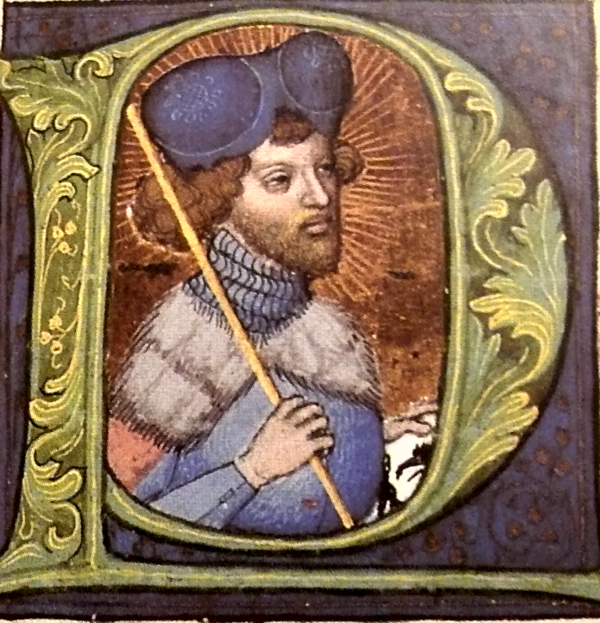
Roman King Wenceslaus. Detail from the Wenceslas Bible, 1390s.

John was invested with the County of Arnsberg by imperial vicar Wenceslaus of Bohemia on 27 July 1369. The county had been sold by the last count, Godfrey IV of Arnsberg, to the Electorate of Cologne, in 1368. The Electorate of Cologne, however, was and remained in possession of the county, and was able to effect the enfeoffment over it from Emperor Charles IV in 1371. John, involved in several disputes around this time, had to let his claims based on an earlier enfeoffment rest for the time being. However, Charles IV's son and successor, Roman King Wenceslaus, enfeoffed him with Arnsberg in Nuremberg in 1379, as a county that had rightfully and honestly accrued to him. John now also made attempts to assert his right and to take possession of the fief. This led to a feud, and although the circumstances of this feud are unknown, the settlements between Archbishop Frederick III and Count John in 1381, 1401 and 1404 prove that the latter was not able to seize the disputed county, but did oust the Electorate of Cologne from the joint ownership of the city of Siegen. John remained in sole possession of the city through these settlements. (Note: Huberty, et al. (1981), p. 219 states that John's sons bought back the other half of Siegen from the Electorate of Cologne.) The archbishop, however, retained his right to Siegen as well as John did with his right to Arnsberg. Count Godfrey IV of Arnsberg had also ceded the office of Marshal of the Duchy of Westphalia to the Electorate of Cologne with his county. This office, and the right to fly the storm flag in Westphalia, had been granted to him by Roman King Louis IV. This very honourable prerogative carried with it the authority to ensure the preservation of the land peace and public safety in the name of the Emperor, to execute the imperial ban on disobedient persons and, finally, to assemble an armed force under the imperial banner against disturbers of the peace or outlaws. It is unknown how this right came to John, probably it was due to his claim to Arnsberg. What is certain, is that from 1392 onwards John granted his vassals, the Lords of Rennenberg, the right to fly this storm flag in the event that he did not go into the field in person.

John exchanged inheritance claims for toll concessions for the city of Siegen with Duke William II of Jülich, thus promoting Siegen's already brisk trade with the Netherlands. William was related to King Edward III of England. Probably through William's mediation, the English royal decrees came about that allowed Siegen's citizens to trade in England undisturbed and with many privileges, and to live according to their own morals and customs. They were exempt from taxes for fortification and city gate tolls. In the Hundred Years' War, noblemen from the Siegerland also fought on the English side.

On 30 November 1376, John concluded a marriage contract with Count Gerhard VII of Diez, for a marriage of the latter's only daughter Jutta to John's eldest son, Adolf. The family of the counts of Diez was on the verge of becoming extinct in the male line; the County of Diez would then pass to Jutta, who was at most eight years old. According to this contract, Adolf would immediately receive everything that was or would become due to his father from the inheritance of Nassau-Hadamar. In addition, Adolf was to receive the dowers belonging to his grandmother Adelaide of Vianden (the Herbermark and the parish of Haiger), as well as half of castle, city and district of Löhnberg, but only until he came into full possession of the Nassau-Hadamar inheritance. The marriage contract further stipulated that the Zents of Nentershausen, Meudt, Salz, Hundsangen, and two others, transferred by Gerhard, Dehrn Castle and the district of Kirberg were to be redeemed by John and given to his daughter-in-law as a dower. The dowry was set at 7,000 guilders and assigned to Dehrn, the six Zents, Laurenburg, the Esterau and the Zents of Diez in the parish of Driedorf. If Gerhard were to die without leaving any sons, his daughter's marriage to Adolf would be consummated immediately and the entire County of Diez would pass to him. For the time being, John was inaugurated in the name of his son in the entire County of Diez, and the administration of Kirberg, Camberg, Weilnau and Wehrheim was transferred to him for eight years in such a way that, if after the expiry of this period the debts paid by John would exceed the income from these districts and lordships, the administration would continue even longer. Nothing remained for Gerhard but de facto sovereignty and the assignment of ecclesiastical and secular fiefdoms. John had to seek dispensation from the Pope for this marriage, because the betrothed were related in the fourth degree, great-grandchildren of the brothers Henry I of Nassau-Siegen and Emicho I of Nassau-Hadamar.

John used the feud with Count John III of Sayn-Wittgenstein to extend his feudal rights over parts of the County of Wittgenstein to its entire territory. John III had incurred the enmity of all his neighbours through devastating invasions of the surrounding lands. In 1390, Landgrave Herman of Hesse and John I united with several of the nobility, the lords of Breidenbach and Hatzfeld, against John III, in order to finally put a stop to his mischief, which had been encouraged by the almost uninterrupted war unrest in Hesse, Nassau and the entire region for a long time. His impassable, mountainous and wooded country, however, provided John III with such safe havens that he could only be defeated after two years. He was taken to Dillenburg Castle as a prisoner and, through the intercession of his friends, was released for a short time, but had to take an oath to surrender himself again at this castle after the expiry of the time limit, Friday after Easter 1392. This happened, and his release did not take place until 28 June, after he had agreed not to rob the streets any more, nor to ravish, rob or burn churches, churchyards and monasteries any more, nor to house and shelter anyone who would do so. He had to swear to the whole treaty and had to renounce all claims from his ancestors and pay a ransom of 1000 gold guilders to avoid a new imprisonment. In addition, he had to abandon all his serfs in Nassau-Siegen and to waive the consequence in respect of the future overdrafts, cede to Nassau-Siegen free hunting and fishing in the County of Wittgenstein with the right to redeem all Wittgenstein pledges, and also open all of his castles to John I. Finally, John III recognised his county as an old Nassau fief and promised to be enfeoffed with the same and all his castles, towns, districts, villages and subjects by Nassau-Siegen for himself and his descendants at any time. On the following day, he issued a special charter concerning the amicable settlement with Hesse and the nobility involved in the alliance.

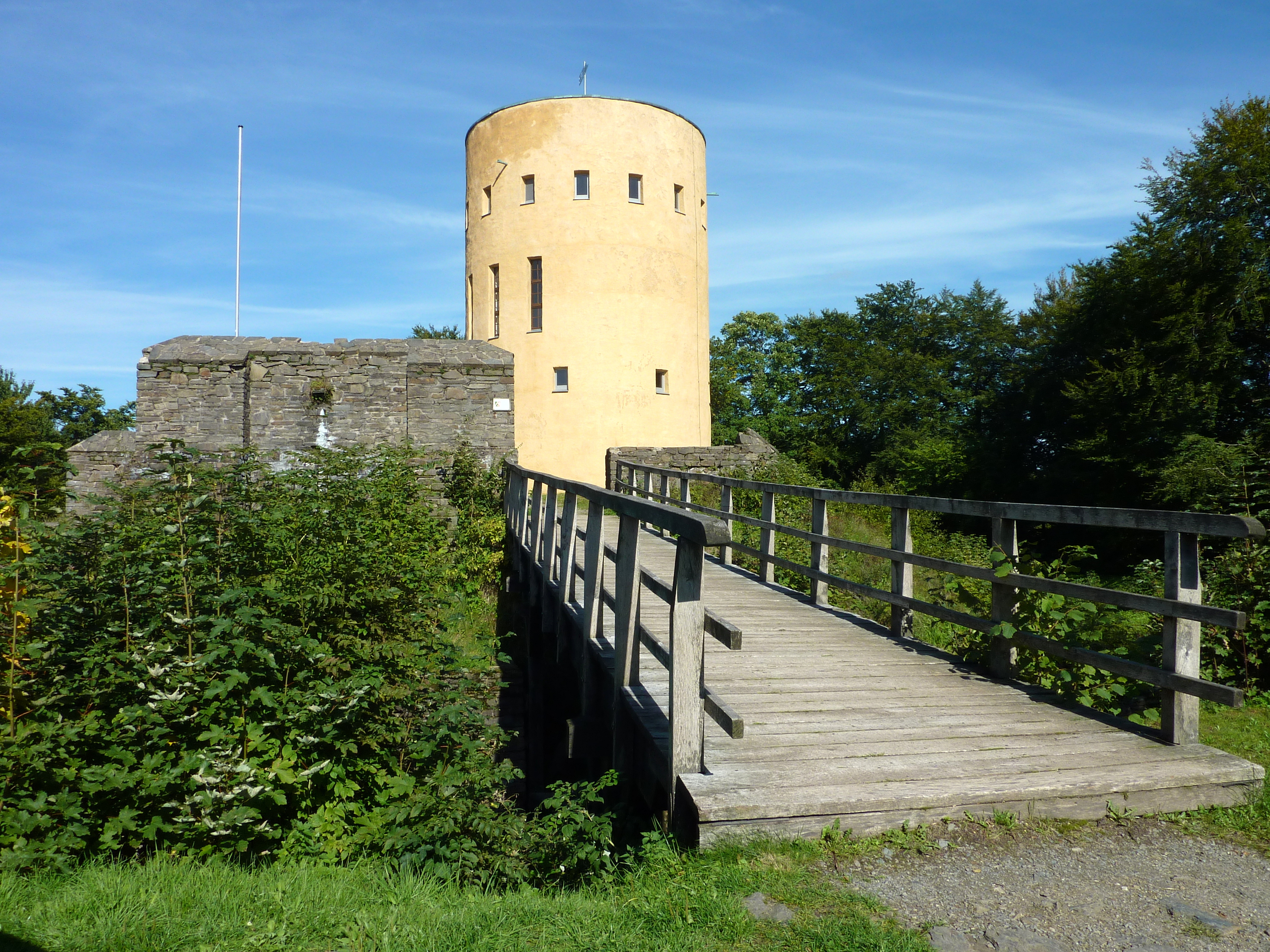
Ginsburg Castle. Photo: Frank Behnsen, 2010.

John sometimes had to endure attacks and abuse from his younger brother, Henry the Swashbuckler, who, even though he was a canon, nevertheless was a brutal fighter of his time, as the disconcerting epithet that his comrades gave him reveals. Before 1389, John built Freudenberg Castle against the lords of Wildenburg and the counts of Sayn. He managed to put an end to the robber knights in his county. In those lawless times, he decided to establish a vehmic court at Ginsburg Castle in the Siegerland. However, the establishment of a vehmic court was not allowed without imperial consent. In 1384 John received it from Roman King Wenceslaus when he visited him in Frankfurt. According to another charter of Wenceslaus from 1389, the seat of the vehmic court was to be at Ginsburg Castle and the judicial district of this court was to extend from the borders of the Westphalian lordship of Bilstein to the County of Sayn. A charter of the same king from 1398 appoints Wynekin von Hilchenbach as a judge of the Ginsburg vehmic court, presumably after the court had been settled. Perhaps, however, John soon realised his own mistake, or perhaps his sons later understood the abuses of this vehmic court; for it did not exist very long. A century later John's great-grandson, Count John V, again established a vehmic court at Ginsburg Castle.

Disagreements with the counts of Solms over Greifenstein eventually led in 1395 to the purchase of this lordship from Count Engelbert of Sayn-Wittgenstein with the permission of the feudal lord, the Bishop of Worms; but for the time being, there was no real takeover. (Note: Dek (1970), p. 214 only mentions the purchase itself and states that it took place on 6 September 1395.) John gained territorial expansion through the succession dispute over the County of Nassau-Hadamar, which were feuds with Count Rupert of Nassau-Sonnenberg and the counts Diether VIII and John IV of Katzenelnbogen. John obtained 1/3 of Hadamar and Ellar Castle, 2/3 of (Bad) Ems, (Note: "Shortly afterwards, the division was revised and (Bad) Ems seems to have belonged half to Nassau and to the counts of Katzenelnbogen (see Handbuch der historische Stätten Deutschlands V, 23). The latter also inherited from Nassau-Hadamar two-thirds of Driedorf, the last third of which had meanwhile passed to Hesse (see Handbuch der historische Stätten Deutschlands V, 75).") the Esterau and Dietkirchen.

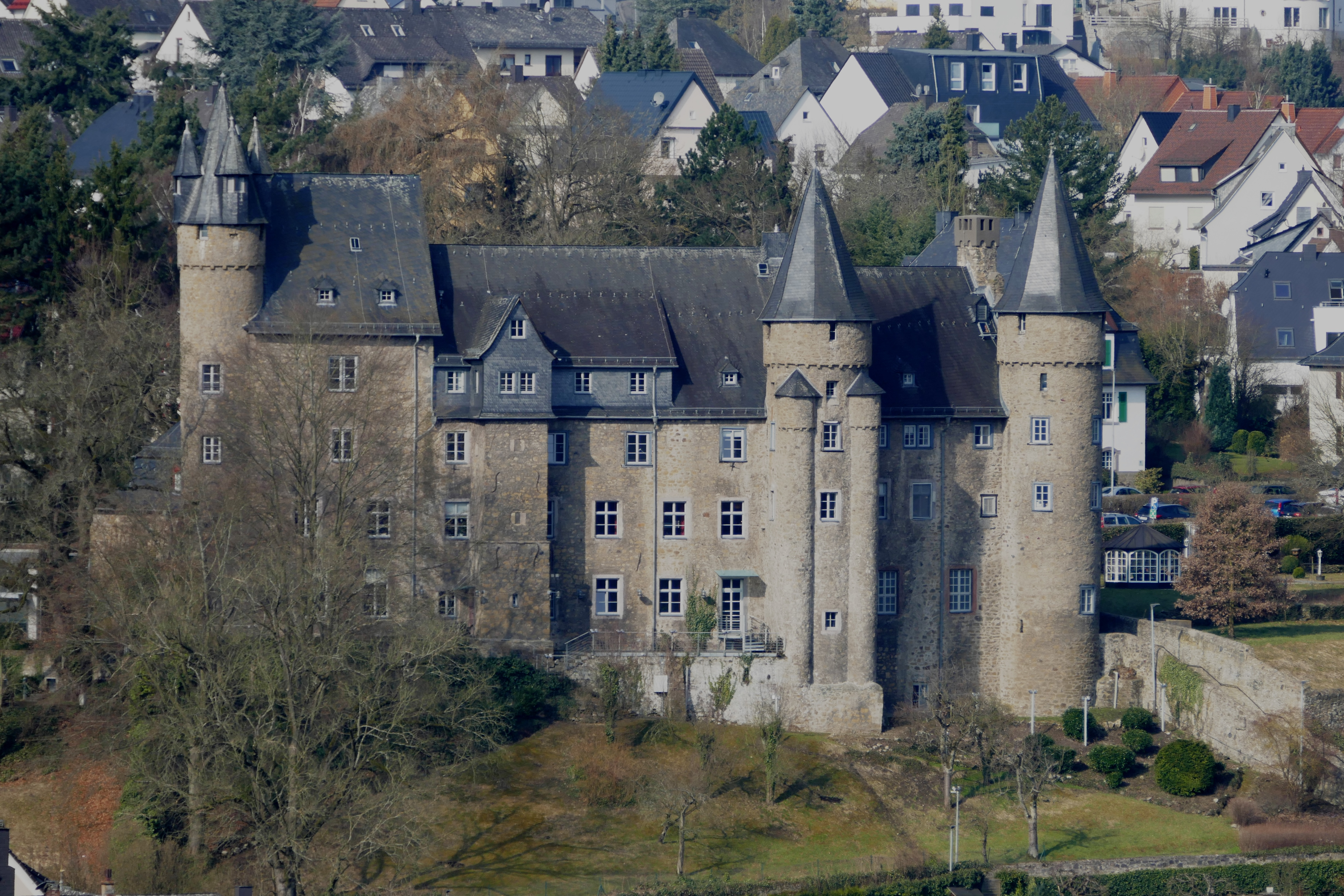
Herborn Castle. Photo: Marco Dienst, 2018.

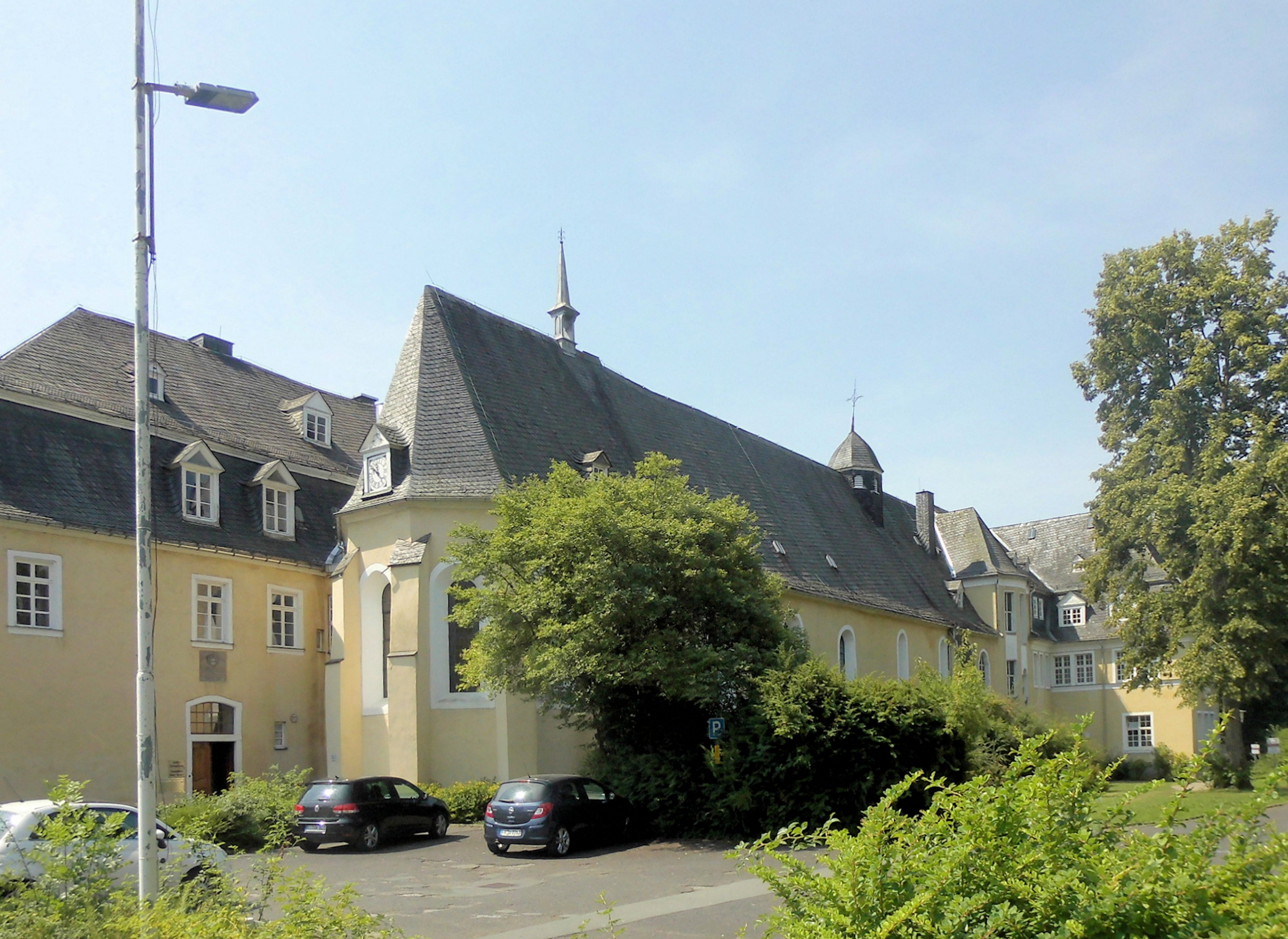
Keppel Abbey Church, 2018.

In his old days, John had himself appointed councillor to the Archbishop of Trier, and in 1400 he also experienced the humiliation of Roman King Wenceslaus. John died at Herborn Castle (Note: Dek (1970), p. 66 and Vorsterman van Oyen (1882), p. 90 state the city of Herborn as place of death.) on 4 September 1416. He was buried in Keppel Abbey near Hilchenbach. He was succeeded by his sons Adolf I, John II with the Helmet, Engelbert I and John III the Younger, who had already agreed on a joint continuation of the government on 21 December 1409. Whichever of the brothers would be native or closest to his lands on the father's death should take possession of them in all brothers' name until a division would have taken place. Likewise, they promised each other, out of conviction of mutual advantages, not to inflict any violent advances on each other, and to allow the preferences of one and the other to apply, which had been established by older decrees. Whoever would take something for himself alone would be disinherited. All parental decrees favouring one brother over the other were declared null and void in advance. Adolf hereby tacitly renounced his right to the part of Nassau-Hadamar and the districts of Herborn, Haiger and Löhnberg, which he could have claimed in advance from the marriage contract with the heiress of the County of Diez. In accordance with this agreement, the brothers took over the government jointly after their father's death in 1416. (Note: Dek (1970), p. 66 and Vorsterman van Oyen (1882), p. 90 state that only Adolf and John with the Helmet succeeded their father.) However, the intended division did not take place: Adolf had no male offspring, the elder John was not married, the younger of the same name was a clergyman; it was to be expected that a division would not last long.

== Marriage and issue ==
John married on 30 November 1357 (Note: von Stramberg (1865), p. 722 and Hoffmann (1842), p. 135 state that the marriage took place in 1361.) to Countess Margaret of the Mark (Note: Her name is incorrectly written as 'of the Marck' in several sources. That spelling of the name is only correct for the cadet branch of her family that bought the Lordship of Sedan in France in 1424, and named themselves 'de la Marck' ever since.) (d. 29 September 1409), daughter of Count Adolf II of the Mark and Countess Margaret of Cleves. John's parents had already signed a marriage contract with Margaret's parents, for a son of Nassau to marry a daughter of the Mark, on 14 August 1343.

Through the marriage, John acquired certain annuities from the Vogtei of Gummersbach in the County of Mark and the revenues of the Counts of the Mark in Hamm, and furthermore, as a pledge for 4,000 gold guilders, the castle and the city of Neustadt, the fortress of Gummersbach and the Amt Lüdenscheid in 1383, in addition to the hereditary claims of Margaret's parents to the Duchy of Cleves and the County of Mark.

John and Margaret were related, as they both descended from the marriage of Count William IV of Jülich and Countess Richardis of Guelders and Zutphen, who were great-great-grandparents of both John and Margaret. Furthermore, John's great-great-grandmother, Countess Matilda of Guelders and Zutphen, was a younger sister of Count Gerard III of Guelders and Zutphen, the great-great-great-grandfather of Margaret.

From the marriage of John and Margaret the following children were born: (Note: Vorsterman van Oyen (1882), p. 91 also mentions a daughter Margaret, married to Count Henry of Waldeck. However, this Margaret was a daughter of Count Walram IV of Nassau-Wiesbaden-Idstein.)

1. Count Adolf I (1362 – 12 June 1420), succeeded his father as Count of Nassau-Siegen. He married:
  1. (marriage contract 30 November 1376 (Note: Huberty, et al. (1981), p. 219 state that the marriage took place in 1388, while Dek (1970), p. 66, and Vorsterman van Oyen (1882), p. 90 state that the marriage took place in 1384.)) to Countess Jutta of Diez (after 1367 – 14 August 1397).
  2. in 1402 to Kunigonda of Isenburg-Limburg (d. 15 March 1403).
2. Count John II with the Helmet (d. Dillenburg Castle, early May 1443 (Note: Dek (1970), p. 66 and Vorsterman van Oyen (1882), p. 90 state that John with the Helmet died in Dillenburg in May 1448. Considering the fact that John's successors divided their possessions on 22 February 1447, the year of death 1448 cannot be correct.)), succeeded his father as Count of Nassau-Siegen.
3. Count Engelbert I (Dillenburg (?), c. 1370 – Breda, 3 May 1442), succeeded his father as Count of Nassau-Siegen. He married in Breda on 1 August 1403 to Lady Joanne of Polanen (10 January 1392 – 15 May 1445).
4. Henry, mentioned in 1389 as student in Cologne, in 1399 as provost in Xanten; last mentioned in 1401.
5. Count John III the Younger (d. 18 April 1430), succeeded his father as Count of Nassau-Siegen.

== Ancestors ==
Ancestors of Count John I of Nassau-Siegen
Great-great-grandparents	Henry II the Rich of Nassau (c. 1180–1247/50) ⚭ before 1215; Matilda of Guelders and Zutphen (d. after 1247)	Emicho IV of Leiningen (d. 1276/79) ⚭ Elisabeth (d. 1263)	Henry of Sponheim (d. c. 1258) ⚭ 1230; Agnes of Valkenburg and Heinsberg (d. 1267)	Godfrey of Gaasbeek (1209–1254) ⚭ 1243; Mary of Oudenaarde (d. 1277)	Philip I of Vianden (d. 1273) ⚭ before 1262; Mary of Perwez (d. 1289)	John of Oudenaarde (d. 1293/94) ⚭ Matilda of Crecques (d. after 1296)	Godfrey III of Arnsberg (d. 1282) ⚭ before 1238; Adelaide of Blieskastel (d. before 1272)	William IV of Jülich (d. 1278) ⚭ Richardis of Guelders and Zutphen (d. 1293/98)
Great-grandparents	Otto I of Nassau (d. 1289/90) ⚭ before 1270; Agnes of Leiningen (d. after 1299)		Thierry II of Heinsberg and Blankenberg (d. 1303) ⚭ 1253; Joanna of Gaasbeek (d. 1291)		Godfrey I of Vianden (d. 1307/10) ⚭ 1278; Adelaide of Oudenaarde (d. 1305)		Louis of Arnsberg (d. 1312/13) ⚭ before 1276; Petronilla of Jülich (d. after 1299)	
Grandparents	Henry I of Nassau-Siegen (c. 1270–1343) ⚭ before 1302; Adelaide of Heinsberg and Blankenberg (d. after 1343)				Philip II of Vianden (d. 1315/16) ⚭ Adelaide of Arnsberg (?–?)			
Parents	Otto II of Nassau-Siegen (c. 1305–1350/51) ⚭ 1331; Adelaide of Vianden (d. 1376)							

== Sources ==
- Becker, E. (1983) [1950]. Schloss und Stadt Dillenburg. Ein Gang durch ihre Geschichte in Mittelalter und Neuzeit. Zur Gedenkfeier aus Anlaß der Verleihung der Stadtrechte am 20. September 1344 herausgegeben (in German) (Neuauflage ed.). Dillenburg: Der Magistrat der Stadt Dillenburg.
- Dek, A.W.E. (1970). Genealogie van het Vorstenhuis Nassau (in Dutch). Zaltbommel: Europese Bibliotheek.
- Hoffmann, A.G., ed. (1842). "Johann I.". Allgemeine Encyklopädie der Wissenschaften und Künste. Zweite Section. H–N (in German). Vol. Einundzwanzigster Theil: Johann Infant von Castilien – Johann-Boniten. Leipzig: F.A. Brochhaus. pp. 134–135.
- Huberty, Michel; Giraud, Alain & Magdelaine, F. & B. (1981). l'Allemagne Dynastique (in French). Vol. Tome III: Brunswick-Nassau-Schwarzbourg. Le Perreux: Alain Giraud. ISBN 2-901138-03-9.
- Joachim, Ernst (1881). "Johann I. (Graf von Nassau-Dillenburg)". Allgemeine Deutsche Biographie (in German). Vol. Band 14. Leipzig: Duncker & Humblot. pp. 250–251.
- Lück, Alfred (1981) [1967]. Siegerland und Nederland (in German) (2nd ed.). Siegen: Siegerländer Heimatverein e.V.
- De Roo van Alderwerelt, J.K.H. (1960). "De graven van Vianden. Bijdrage tot een genealogie van het geslacht der graven van Vianden tot de vererving van het graafschap in het Nassause huis". De Nederlandsche Leeuw, Maandblad van het Koninklijk Nederlandsch Genootschap voor Geslacht- en Wapenkunde (in Dutch). 1960 (6): 196.
- von Stramberg, Chr. (1865). Denkwürdiger und nützlicher Rheinischer Antiquarius, welcher die wichtigsten und angenehmsten geographischen historischen und politischen Merkwürdigkeiten des ganzen Rheinstroms, von seinem Ausflusse in das Meer bis zu seinem Ursprunge darstellt. Von einem Nachforscher in historischen Dingen. Mittelrhein. Der II. Abtheilung. 13. Band. Der Rheingau. Historisch und topografisch (in German). Vol. Vierter Band. Coblenz: Rud. Friedr. Hergt.
- Vorsterman van Oyen, A.A. (1882). Het vorstenhuis Oranje-Nassau. Van de vroegste tijden tot heden (in Dutch). Leiden & Utrecht: A.W. Sijthoff & J.L. Beijers.

John I of Nassau-Siegen House of Nassau-Siegen Born: c. 1339 Died: 4 September 1416
Regnal titles
Preceded by Otto II	Count of Nassau-Siegen; December 1350/January 1351 – 4 September 1416	Succeeded by Adolf I John II with the Helmet; Engelbert I John III the Younger
