= Adelaide of Vianden =

German countess (d. 1376)

- Countess Consort of Nassau-Siegen
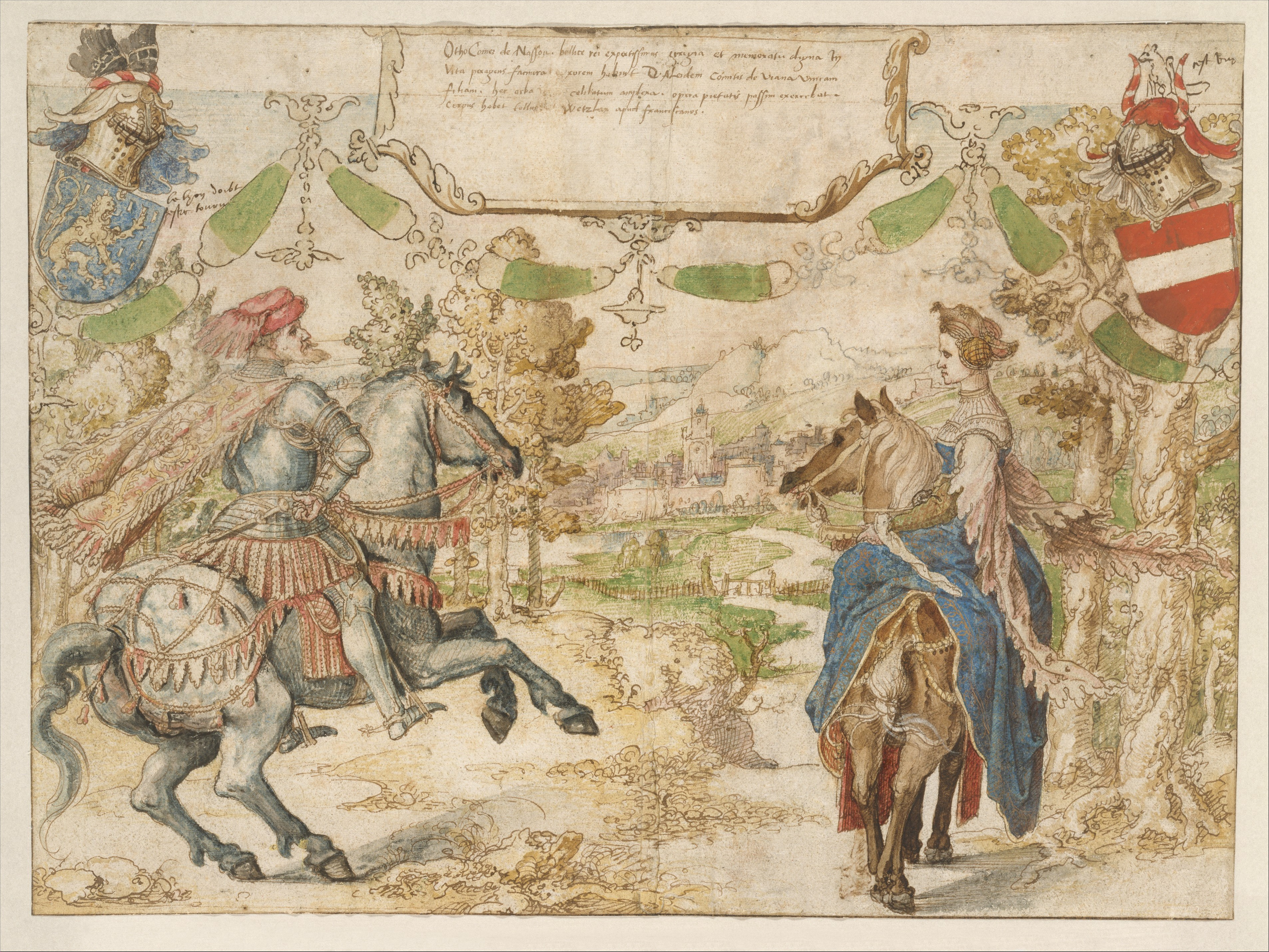
- Adelaide and her husband Count Otto II. Design drawing by Bernard van Orley for the tapestry from the series with the genealogy of the House of Nassau, 1530–1535

Countess Regent of Nassau-Siegen
- Coat of arms
- Reign: 1351–1362
- Full name: Adelaide Countess of Vianden
- Native name: Adelheid Gräfin von Vianden
- Died: 30 September 1376
- Noble family: House of Vianden
- Spouse: Otto II of Nassau-Siegen
- Issue Detail: John I; Henry; Otto
- Father: Philip II of Vianden
- Mother: Adelaide of Arnsberg

Countess Adelaide of Vianden (d. 30 September 1376; German: Adelheid Gräfin von Vianden) was a countess from the House of Vianden, the cadet branch of the House of Sponheim that ruled the County of Vianden, and through marriage Countess of Nassau-Siegen. She acted as regent of the County of Nassau-Siegen for her eldest son during his minority in the period 1351–1362.

Adelaide, described as a clever and energetic woman, endeavoured to gradually settle the numerous feuds inherited by her and her son with the local noble families, the powerful lords of Bicken, Walderdorff and Haiger, although she herself did not disdain to take up the gauntlet forced upon her on one occasion or another. On the other hand, she also resolved many of the pledges entered into by her husband. In the underdeveloped County of Nassau-Siegen, where the local nobility thought they had a free hand, she kept the reins tight.

== Biography ==
Adelaide was the only daughter of Count Philip II of Vianden and Countess Adelaide of Arnsberg. (Note: Dek (1970), p. 66 states that the name of the mother was 'Lucia v.d. Neuerburg'. Vorsterman van Oyen (1882), p. 89 states that her parents were Count Godfrey III of Vianden and Countess Maria Flandrina of Namur.) When and where Adelaide was born is unknown.

=== Marriage ===
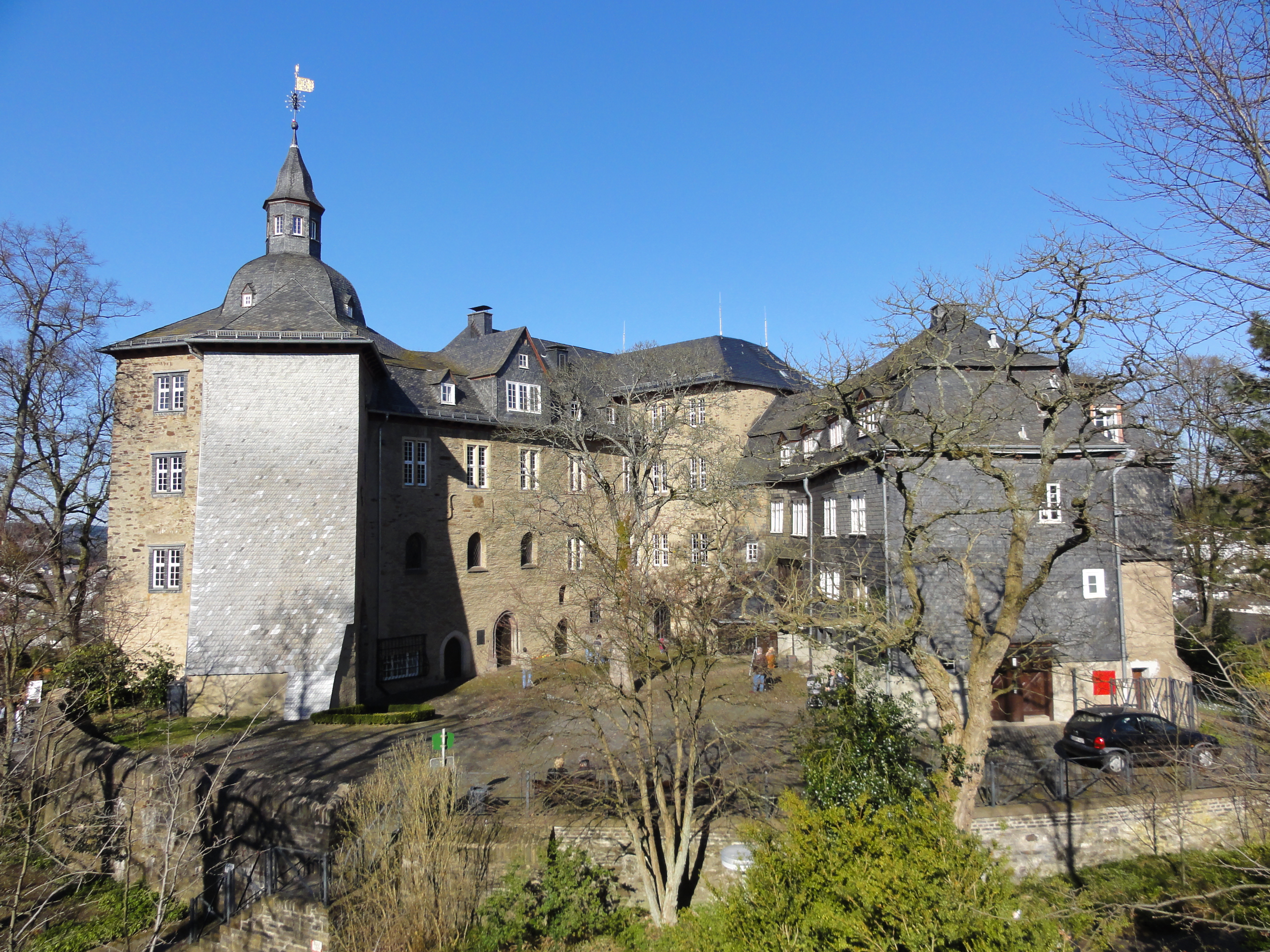
Siegen Castle, 2011.

Adelaide married (marriage contract 23 December 1331 (Note: Lück (1981), p. 22, Vorsterman van Oyen (1882), p. 89 and von Stramberg (1865), p. 712 state that the marriage took place in 1331.)) to Count Otto II of Nassau-Siegen (c. 1305 (Note: Lück (1981), p. 22 and De Roo van Alderwerelt (1960) state that he was born c. 1300. Given the wedding date of his parents (before 1302), a birth c. 1305 is the most likely.) – between 6 December 1350 and 25 January 1351).

Adelaide and Otto were second cousins once removed. Adelaide's great-great-grandfather, Count Gerard III of Guelders and Zutphen, was an elder brother of Countess Matilda of Guelders and Zutphen, a great-grandmother of Otto.

Otto succeeded his father in July or August 1343 in Siegerland, the Mark Herborn with Dillenburg and the district of Haiger, as well as Löhnberg. The following year, Otto sold the castle and lordship of Löhnberg to Count palatine Rupert I and Count Gerlach I of Nassau.

Otto is not considered to have been a good regent. His short reign was a succession of feuds during which the country was devastated and the sources of prosperity were blocked. To control his expenses, he was forced to pledge possessions frequently and as a result the development of a powerful activity inwardly as well as outwardly was hampered. He was forced to sell the Nassau half of the city of Siegen to the Electorate of Cologne and lost all parts of the Land Wildenburg of the Wildenburg Castle (Hunsrück) fief that Nassau had acquired to the County of Sayn. And in 1349, he had to pledge the parish of Haiger and half of Ginsburg Castle to the lords of Haiger and the Electorate of Cologne. In his last feud, against the brothers Gottfried and Wilderich III von Walderdorff, Otto was killed in a battle, that, according to charters, must have taken place between 6 December 1350 and 25 January 1351. (Note: Dek (1970), p. 65 and Vorsterman van Oyen (1882), p. 89 state that Otto was killed in December 1350 or January 1351. Becker (1983), p. 12 states that Otto probably was killed in the Westerwald towards the end of 1350. De Roo van Alderwerelt (1960) states that Otto died near Beilstein at the end of 1350. And Ausfeld (1887), p. 708 states that Otto was killed at the end of 1350.) As the children were still minors, Adelaide assumed regency over the county.

=== Regency ===
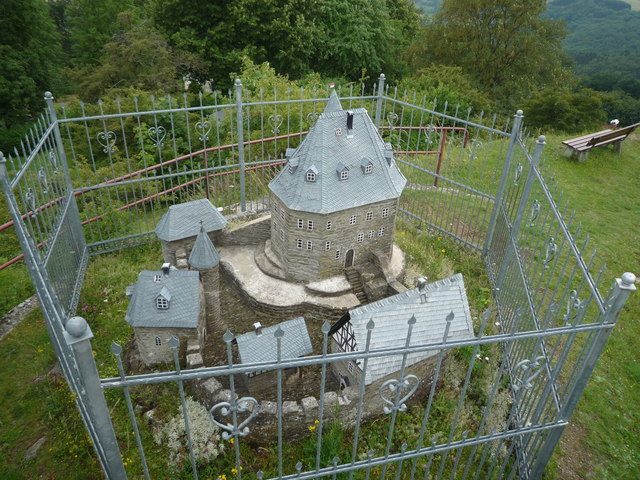
Model of Tringenstein Castle.

Adelaide is considered to have been a good regent. A clever and energetic woman, she endeavoured to gradually settle the numerous feuds inherited by her and her son with the local noble families, the powerful lords of Bicken, Walderdorff and Haiger, although she herself did not disdain to take up the gauntlet forced upon her on one occasion or another. On the other hand, she also resolved many of the pledges entered into by her husband. In the underdeveloped County of Nassau-Siegen, where the local nobility thought they had a free hand, she kept the reins tight. She did have to pledge land to clear her husband's debts, and although ending her husband's numerous feuds was not without sacrifice, these agreements brought her the peace for undisturbed reconstruction. The unfinished feuds and frequent interference from the country's resident powerful nobility forced her to make new debts. As early as 1350/51 she had Tringenstein Castle built as a countermeasure against the new Hessian castle Neu-Dernbach Castle. She had built the castle on allodial land of the lords of Bicken and had the ownership rights to the castle hill known as 'Murstein' confirmed in 1352. This way, the feud with Gerlach and Friedrich von Bicken, whose allies were the lords of Wildenburg and Elkershausen, which was highly damaging for both sides, was settled.

Also in 1352, Adelaide succeeded in buying back the former Nassau half of the city of Siegen from the Electorate of Cologne for "zwey dusent alte schyldgulden" ("two thousand old shield guilders"). And in that year, she reconciled with the Walderdorff brothers, to whom Otto's death seems to have been mainly attributed. With the reconciliation, the Walderdorff brothers had to release the prisoners without ransom, take their goods and tithes in Nassau in fief from the counts and, in addition, provide them with four vassals. Two years later, in 1354, Adolf von Wilmerode, Wilhelm von Hadamar, Rorich Bücher von Lurenburg, Godebracht von Irmtraud and Andreas von Dernbach, as helpers in that feud, also reconciled with Adelaide, under the same condition, that each of them dedicate a part of his hereditary property to Nassau in fief. In 1356, Adelaide was forced to conclude a protection alliance with Landgrave Henry II 'the Iron' of Hesse, opening all Nassau castles to the landgrave, during her son's minority.

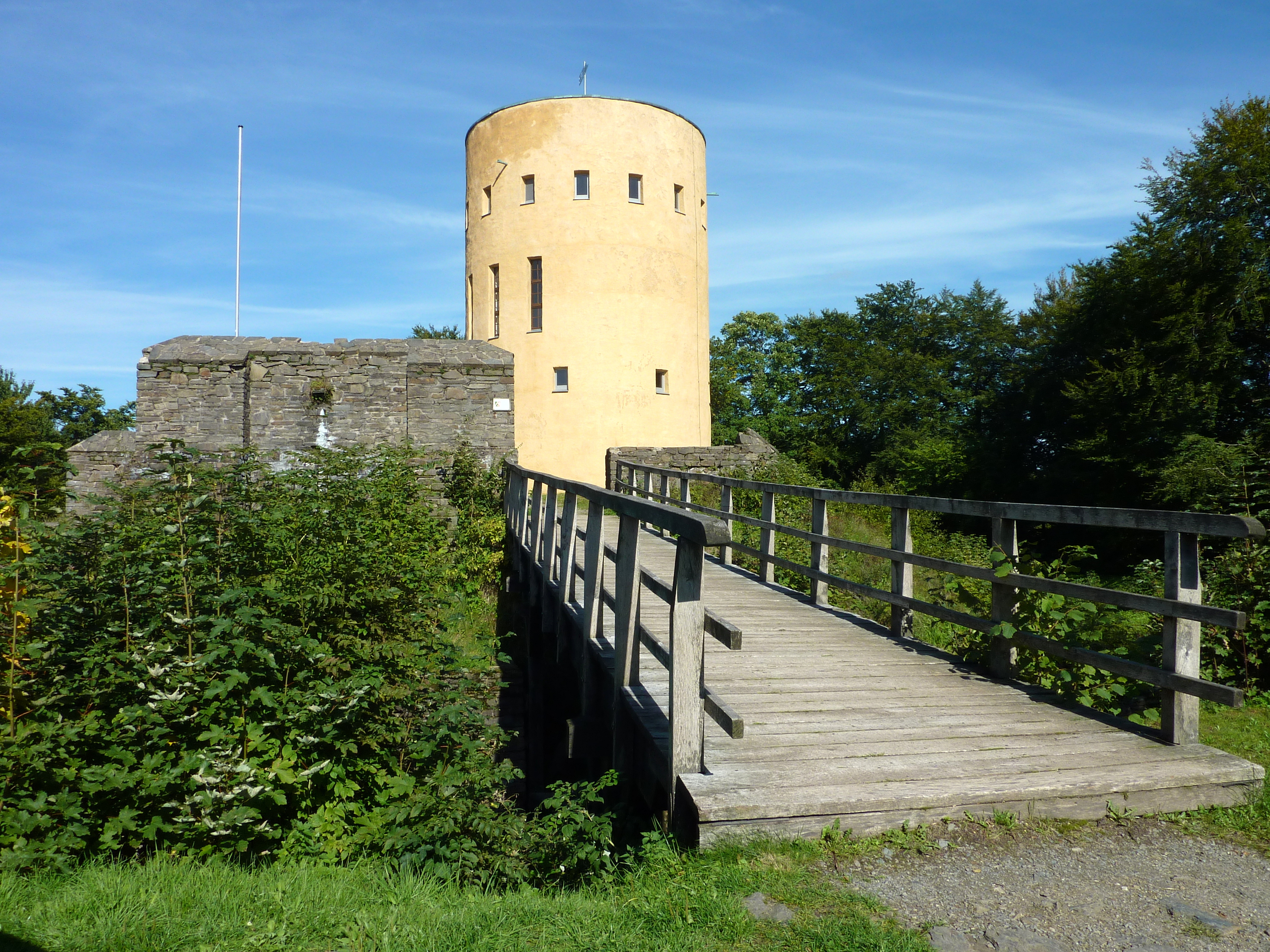
Ginsburg Castle.

In the district of Haiger, the noble family of the same name had been very powerful from old times. Under the favour of its feudal lords, it resisted the overlordship of the Counts of Nassau. John's minority seemed to be the most opportune time for it to shake off this yoke completely. Heiderich von Haiger's arrogance went so far that he allowed himself to commit abuses against the person of the young John. An open feud ensued, the ruinous consequences of which, as usual, affected the countryside and its inhabitants. Adelaide, however, did not lack courage and steadfastness to counter the insolence and violence of her enemies with vigour and to defend the rights of her son. There is no doubt that she benefited greatly from the support of her allies, Landgrave Henry II 'the Iron' of Hesse and his son Otto 'the Younger'. The conflict with sword and lance was followed by a legal dispute, before a settlement was concluded in 1357 by Count Thierry III of Looz, the chairman of the court, in a decision written in 63 articles, which is a most remarkable explanation of the customs and rights of that age. The pledge of the parish of Haiger and half of Ginsburg Castle was undone. It decided the struggle with the lords of Haiger for supremacy in the Mark Haiger in favour of the Nassaus. The lords of Haiger became vassals of the Nassaus. The beneficial consequences of peace and tranquillity became apparent in the next few years.

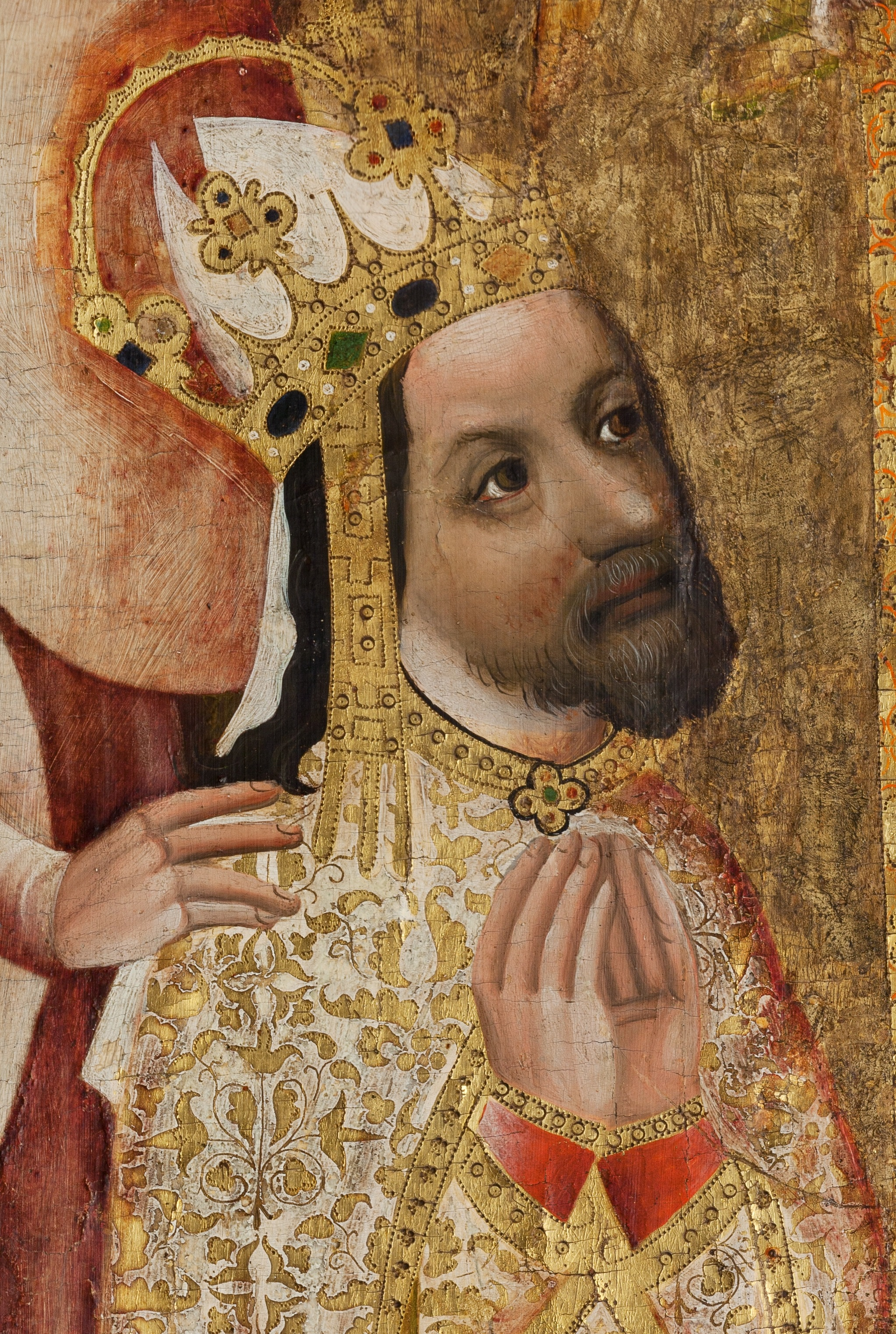
Emperor Charles IV. Detail from the Votive Panel of Jan Očko of Vlašim, before 1371.

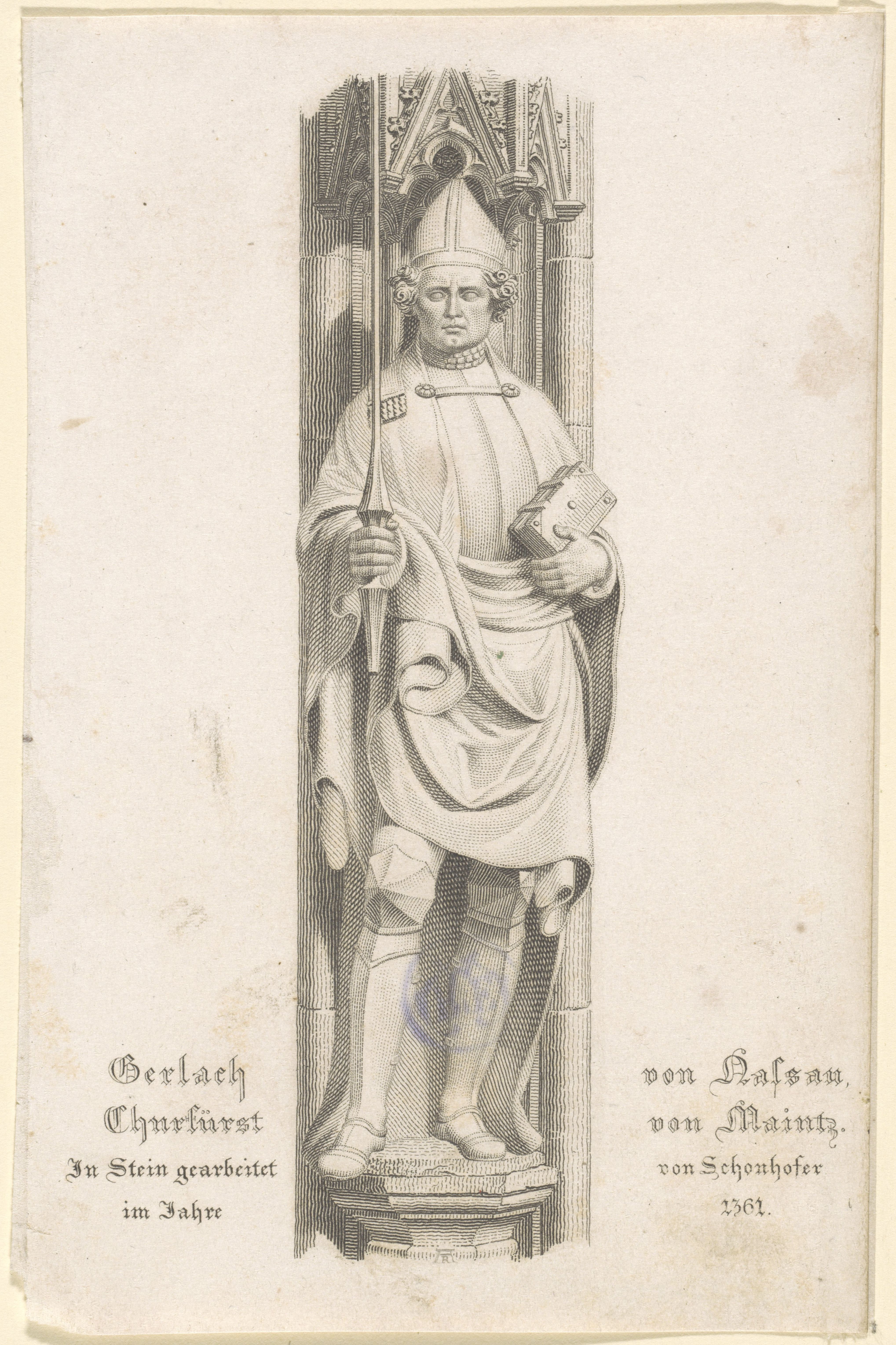
Gerlach of Nassau, Archbishop of Mainz. Anonymous engraving of a statue made by Schonhofer in 1361, 17th century.

From 1359 to 1362, Adelaide and John redeemed the most considerable pledges. Because of 3200 pounds Heller and 2000 shield guilders, which Holy Roman Emperor Charles IV owed the deceased Count Otto, he assigned 1½ old large tornesel from some water or land tolls. Often to such grants this clause was added: 'when he may acquire it at a prince's or lord's tolls'. If an agreement was reached with the owner of the toll, the toll's duty was increased in proportion to the sum granted, which, of course, should only have been temporary in accordance with the intention, but which may have given rise to many a continuing increase in toll's duty that was detrimental to trade. Adelaide and her son, as it seems, sought satisfaction for the aforementioned debt of Emperor Charles IV to the toll of the Electorate of Mainz at Oberlahnstein, which was closest to them. In any case, they had even older claims on the Electorate of Mainz, probably dating back to Roman King Louis IV's time. As usual, a feud ensued. In the autumn of 1362, Archbishop Gerlach, (Note: Archbishop Gerlach of Mainz descended from the Walramian Line of the House of Nassau, and was therefore a distant cousin of Adelaide and her son John.) invaded Nassau-Siegen with 500 horsemen, each of whom, according to the custom of the time, were accompanied by a few armed footmen. The long known belligerent peasants of the Rheingau scorched, looted and devastated the county, but had to retreat across the Rhine when the floods came, to prevent being cut off. In December of the same year, Gerlach and John signed a peace treaty at Aschaffenburg. Gerlach promised to pay 3500 florins and to grant John a tornesel from the toll at Oberlahnstein until he would have drawn 2000 florins from it. Also in 1362, Adelaide handed over the reign to her eldest son.

Adelaide died on 30 September 1376. (Note: Vorsterman van Oyen (1882), p. 89 and von Stramberg (1865), p. 712 state that she was still alive on 30 November 1376.) It is unknown where she was buried. (Note: Dek (1970), p. 66 states that she was buried in Dillenburg. That is very unlikely because, according to Becker (1983), pp. 48–49, Dillenburg did not get its own parish church until 1491. Before 1491, Dillenburg belonged to the parish of Feldbach.)

=== Legacy ===
When Elisabeth of Sponheim-Kreuznach, Countess of Vianden, died without issue in 1417, Adelaide's grandsons, Adolf I, John II 'with the Helmet', Engelbert I and John III 'the Younger' of Nassau-Siegen, inherited the County of Vianden with the lordships of St. Vith, Bütgenbach, Dasburg and Grimbergen. The King of the Netherlands still holds the titles Count of Vianden, Lord of St. Vith, Bütgenbach and Dasburg.

The coat of arms of the County of Vianden became the certification mark of the steel from Siegen, which was hammered as a trademark into the steel by blacksmiths for generations, and with that steel went around the world.

== First marriage? ==
In his genealogy of the House of Nassau, A.W.E. Dek states that Adelaide was first married to Johan v. Dollendorf-Cronenberg. That marriage is not mentioned by A.A. Vorsterman van Oyen in his genealogy of the same house.

== Issue ==
From the marriage of Adelaide and Otto the following children were born:

1. Count John I (c. 1339 – Herborn Castle, 4 September 1416), succeeded his father as Count of Nassau-Siegen. He married on 30 November 1357 to Countess Margaret of the Mark (Note: Her name is incorrectly written as 'of the Marck' in several sources. That spelling of the name is only correct for the cadet branch of her family that bought the Lordship of Sedan in France in 1424, and named themselves 'de la Marck' ever since.) (d. 29 September 1409).
2. Henry 'the Swashbuckler' (d. Kassel, 5 September 1402), was canon at the Cologne Cathedral since 1356.
3. Otto (d. 1384), was canon and provost of Saint Maurice Church in Mainz since 1357 and canon of the Cologne Cathedral and the Mainz Cathedral since 1380.

Adelaide and Otto signed a marriage contract with Count Adolf II of the Mark and Countess Margaret of Cleves, for a son of Nassau to marry a daughter of the Mark, on 14 August 1343.

The second son, Henry 'the Swashbuckler', although being a clergyman, was nevertheless a brutal fighter of his time, as the disconcerting epithet that his comrades gave him reveals. He even sometimes attacked his eldest brother John.

== Ancestors ==
Ancestors of Adelaide of Vianden
Great-great-grandparents	Henry I of Vianden (?–1252) ⚭ before 1217; Margaret of Courtenay (1194/98–1258)	Godfrey of Perwez (?–1257) ⚭ 1237; Alix of Grimbergen (?–1247)	Arnold IV of Oudenaarde (?–1242) ⚭ Alix of Rozoy (?–1265)	Anseau II of Crecques (?–?) ⚭ Beatrice of Guinness (?–?)	Godfrey II of Arnsberg (?–1236) ⚭ before 1198; Elisabeth (?–1217/23)	Henry of Blieskastel (?–1237) ⚭ before 1225; Agnes of Sayn (?–1259)	William III of Jülich (?–1218) ⚭ Matilda of Limburg (?–1234)	Gerard III of Guelders and Zutphen (c. 1185–1229) ⚭ 1206; Margaret of Brabant (?–1231)
Great-grandparents	Philip I of Vianden (?–1273) ⚭ before 1262; Mary of Perwez (?–1289)		John of Oudenaarde (?–1293/94) ⚭ Matilda of Crecques (?–na 1296)		Godfrey III of Arnsberg (?–1282) ⚭ before 1238; Adelaide of Blieskastel (?–before 1272)		William IV of Jülich (?–1278) ⚭ Richardis of Guelders and Zutphen (?–1293/98)	
Grandparents	Godfrey I of Vianden (?–1307/1310) ⚭ 1278; Adelaide of Oudenaarde (?–1305)				Louis of Arnsberg (?–1312/13) ⚭ before 1276; Petronilla of Jülich (?–after 1299)			
Parents	Philip II of Vianden (?–1315/16) ⚭ Adelaide of Arnsberg (?–?)							

== Sources ==
- Ausfeld, Eduard (1887). "Otto II. (Graf von Nassau)". Allgemeine Deutsche Biographie (in German). Vol. Band 24. Leipzig: Duncker & Humblot. pp. 707–708.
- Becker, E. (1983) [1950]. Schloss und Stadt Dillenburg. Ein Gang durch ihre Geschichte in Mittelalter und Neuzeit. Zur Gedenkfeier aus Anlaß der Verleihung der Stadtrechte am 20. September 1344 herausgegeben (in German) (Neuauflage ed.). Dillenburg: Der Magistrat der Stadt Dillenburg.
- Dek, A.W.E. (1970). Genealogie van het Vorstenhuis Nassau (in Dutch). Zaltbommel: Europese Bibliotheek.
- Huberty, Michel; Giraud, Alain & Magdelaine, F. & B. (1981). l'Allemagne Dynastique (in French). Vol. Tome III: Brunswick-Nassau-Schwarzbourg. Le Perreux: Alain Giraud.
- Lück, Alfred (1981) [1967]. Siegerland und Nederland (in German) (2nd ed.). Siegen: Siegerländer Heimatverein e.V.
- De Roo van Alderwerelt, J.K.H. (1960). "De graven van Vianden. Bijdrage tot een genealogie van het geslacht der graven van Vianden tot de vererving van het graafschap in het Nassause huis". De Nederlandsche Leeuw, Maandblad van het Koninklijk Nederlandsch Genootschap voor Geslacht- en Wapenkunde (in Dutch). 1960 (6): 196.
- von Stramberg, Chr. (1865). Denkwürdiger und nützlicher Rheinischer Antiquarius, welcher die wichtigsten und angenehmsten geographischen historischen und politischen Merkwürdigkeiten des ganzen Rheinstroms, von seinem Ausflusse in das Meer bis zu seinem Ursprunge darstellt. Von einem Nachforscher in historischen Dingen. Mittelrhein. Der II. Abtheilung. 18. Band. Der Rheingau. Historisch und topografisch (in German). Vol. Vierter Band. Coblenz: Rud. Friedr. Hergt.
- Vorsterman van Oyen, A.A. (1882). Het vorstenhuis Oranje-Nassau. Van de vroegste tijden tot heden (in Dutch). Leiden/Utrecht: A.W. Sijthoff/J.L. Beijers.

Adelaide of Vianden House of Vianden Born: ? Died: 30 September 1376
Regnal titles
Preceded by Adelaide of Heinsberg and Blankenberg	Countess Consort of Nassau-Siegen; August 1343 – December 1350/January 1351	Vacant Title next held by Margaret of the Mark
Succession of underage son	Countess Regent of Nassau-Siegen; 1351–1362	Son became of age
