= Anton Joseph Weidenbach =

German archivist and historian

Anton Joseph Weidenbach (9 April 1809 in Linz am Rhein – 21 November 1871 in Wiesbaden) was a German schoolteacher, archivist and historian, who specialized in history of the Rhineland.

From 1825 he attended the teacher's training school in Brühl, and from 1829 to 1835 worked as a schoolteacher in the town of Bacharach. Afterwards he taught classes at the municipal school in Ahrweiler, where he also worked as city archivist. In 1840 he obtained his qualification to teach in secondary schools from the University of Bonn. With Bonn professors Karl Simrock, Gottfried Kinkel and historian Johann Christian von Stramberg, he maintained frequent correspondence.

In 1848 he made speeches in favor of the revolutionary activities taking place in Germany. Fearing reprisal after suppression of the Hecker uprising, he temporarily fled to Belgium. In 1849 he returned to Germany, and found employment as a teacher at the higher Töchterschule in Bingen. In 1864 he retired from teaching and moved to Wiesbaden, where he worked as a statistician.

== Selected works ==
Following the death of Johann Christian von Stramberg in 1868, he continued publication of the massive Rheinischer Antiquarius with five additional volumes (34 volumes total).

- Die Grafen von Are, Hochstaden, Nurburg und Neuenare : ein Beitrag zur rheinischen Geschichte, 1844 – The counts of Are, Hochstaden, Nürburg and Neuenahr: a contribution to Rhenish history.
- Mythologie der Griechen, Römer und nordischen Völker, 1850 – Mythology of the Greeks, Romans and Nordic peoples.
- Mythologie der Skandinavier und Deutschen : mit Bezugstellen aus deutschen und nordischen Dichtern, 1851 – Mythology of the Scandinavians and Germans with references from German and Nordic poets.
- Regesten der Stadt Bingen, des Schlosses Klopp und des Klosters Rupertsberg, 1853 – Registry of the town of Bingen, Klopp Castle and the Rupertsberg monastery.
- Calendarium historico-christianum medii et novi aevi, 1855.
- Das Leben des ehrwürdigen Dieners Gottes Bartholomäus Holzhauser, 1858 – The life of Venerable Bartholomew Holzhauser.
- Die Thermen von Neuenahr und dessen Umgebungen mit Bezug auf Natur, Kunst und Geschichte ein vollständiger Führer für Curgäste, 1864 – The thermal baths of Neuenahr and its surroundings, etc.
- Abstammung und Genealogie des Fürstlichen Hauses Löwenstein-Wertheim, 1870 – Ancestry and genealogy of the princely houses of Loewenstein-Wertheim.
