= Counts of Vianden =

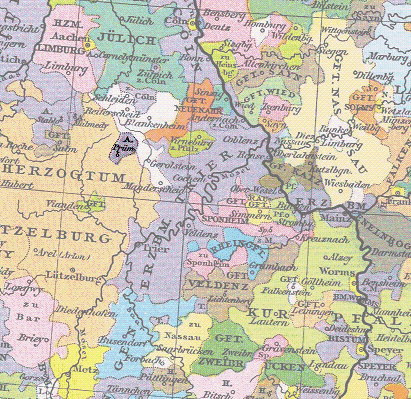
The region around Vianden in 1400.

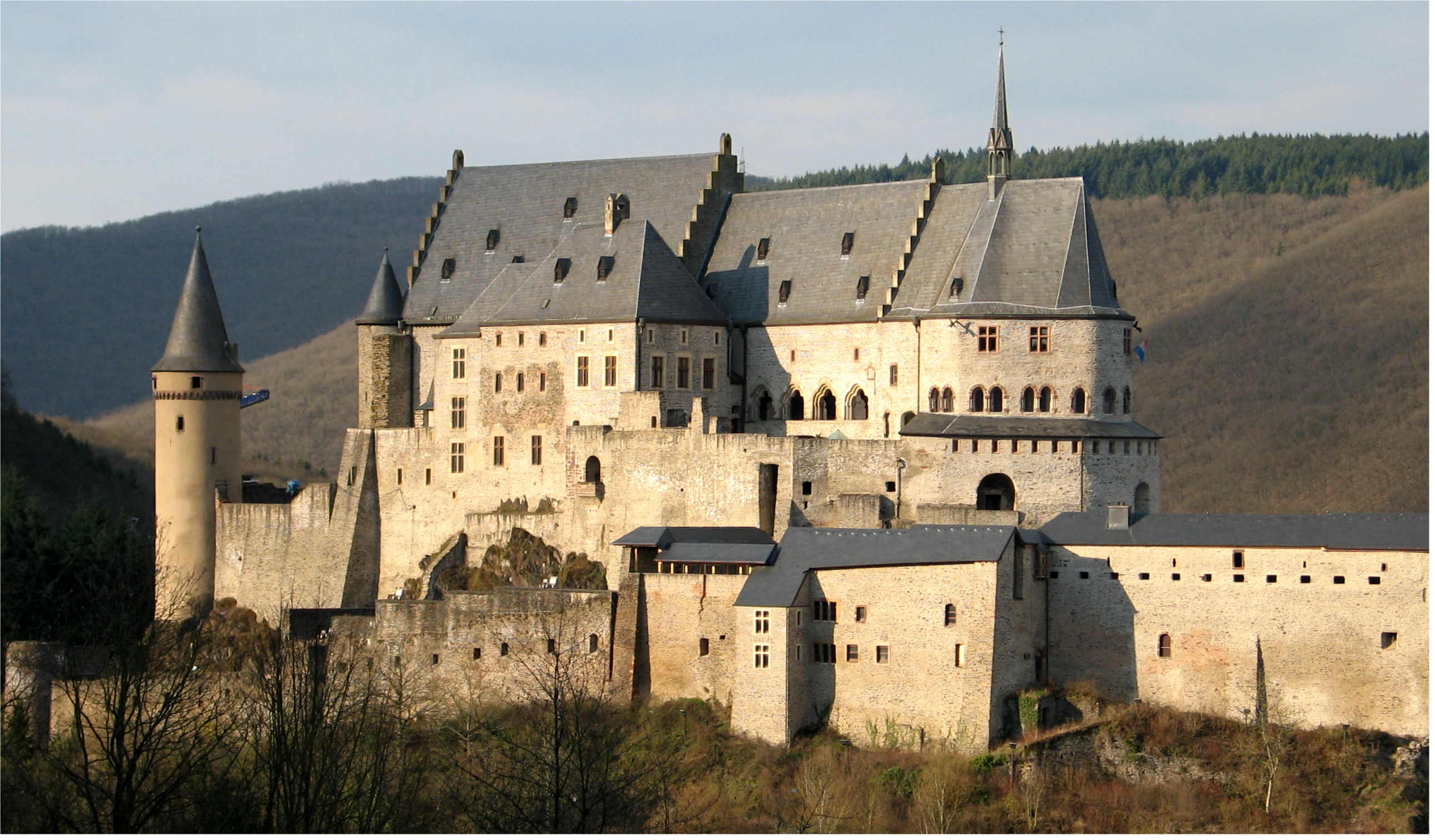
The Castle of Vianden, built in the 11th and 12th centuries.

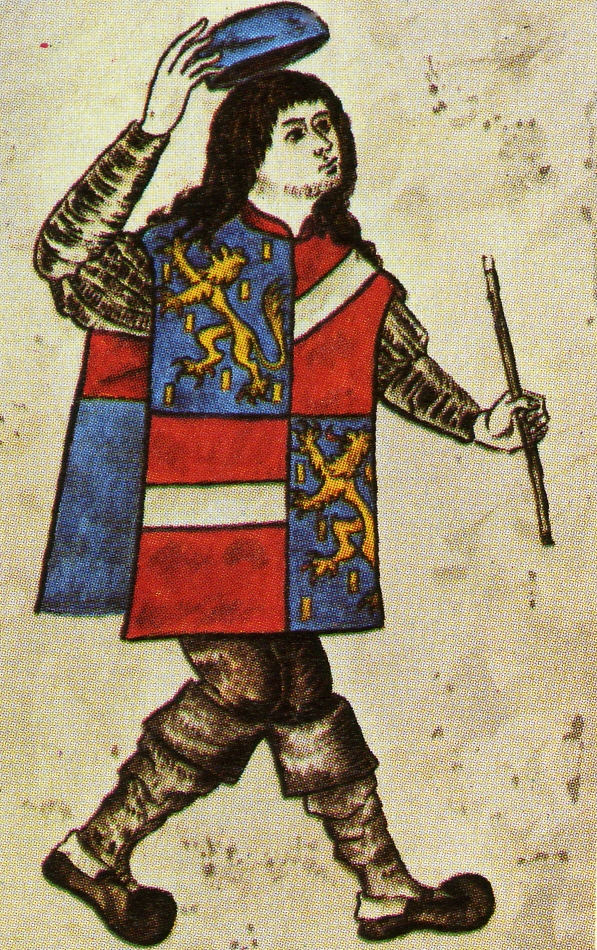
A herald of Nassau-Vianden.

The Counts of Vianden, ancestors of the House of Orange-Nassau, were associated with the castle of Vianden (Vianden Castle) in Luxembourg.

In the 12th to 15th centuries the counts of Vianden were the mightiest lords of the area between the rivers Rhine, Mosel and Maas. Their territory was in modern Vianden canton, Luxemburg and Bitburg-Prüm, Germany.

One recognition of their importance was that Henry I of Vianden (c. 1200–1252) in 1216 married Margaret, Marchioness of Namur (c. 1194–1270) of the Capetian House of Courtenay, and daughter of Peter II of Courtenay (1167–1217), emperor of Constantinople. It was the peak of its power, but in 1264 Vianden became a vassal to the counts of Luxembourg. Godefroid I participated in the Battle of Worringen in 1288 as a vassal to the Duchy of Brabant. The male line of the ruling house of Vianden became extinct in 1337.

== Early counts of Vianden ==
- Bertolph count of Vianden (first reference from 1090, "Bertolf Comes de Vianne"), probably from the counts of Hamm, Bitburg-Prüm or Vogts of Prüm.

== House of Vianden (with time of reign) ==
Numberings and names can vary and the year details have several uncertainties and should be taken as approximative due to some conjecture in lack of complete documentation. In this list mostly the English name versions are used.

- Gerhard (about 1100), probably from the house of Sponheim. Married Adelheid. He is told to have founded Höningen monastery in Altleiningen in 1096.
- Gerhard I, Count of Clervaux (1129-1156), son of Gerhard.
- Frederic I of Vianden (1124-c. 1150), son of Gerhard. According to some accounts Frederic I was appointed as the "first count of Vianden", as a Vogt of Prüm and Undervogt of Electorate of Trier. Probably married to a daughter of Bertolph.
- Siegfried I of Vianden (1152-1171), son of Frederic I.
- Frederic II of Vianden (1163-1187), son of Frederic I. Married countess Elisabeth of Salm, and became count of Niedersalm (1163-1175) jure uxoris, while Elizabeth's brother Henry II got Obersalm. Their son William I inherited the county of Niedersalm.
- Frederic III of Vianden (1184-1220), son of Frederic II. He married Mechthild (Mathilde), assumingly of Neuerburg, with a disputed and confusing ancestry. At least their son Frederic I inherited Neuerburg, and married Cecilie of Isenburg Kovern, but that dynasty became extinct with the death of Frederick III in 1332.
- Henry I of Vianden (1220-1252), son of Frederic III. He married Margaret, Marchioness of Namur, House of Courtenay. One of their sons was Frederic (d. 1247), married to Mathilde of Salm, with issue Henry, Lord of Schönecken (de) (1248-1299), starting a short-lived cadet line.
- Philip I of Vianden (1252-1273), son of Henry I. He married Marie of Brabant-Perwez, daughter of Godfrey of Louvain, Lord of Perwez, apparently a descendant of Godfrey III, Count of Louvain and Landgrave of Brabant (1142-1190).
- Godfrey or Godefroid I of Vianden (1273-1307/1310), son of Philip I. He married Aleidis van Oudenaarde.
- Philip II of Vianden (1307/1310-1315/1316), son of Godefroid I. He married Lucia of Neuerburg and Adelheid of Arnsberg, daughter of Count Louis of Arnsberg and Petronella of Jülich
- Henry II of Vianden (1317–1337), son of Philip II. He married Maria of Dampierre (Namur), daughter of Jean of Namur. Henry had a Herrschaft (territory) under his uncle Gerhard V of Jülich.
- Louis (1337-1343), son of Philip II
- Maria (1343-1348), daughter of Henry II. She married Simon III, Count of Sponheim-Kreuznach (d. 1414).
- Maria and Simon III (1348-1400) jure uxoris, from 1380 also Count of Sponheim-Kreuznach, joining Vianden and Sponheim-Kreuznach.
- Simon III of Sponheim-Kreuznach (1400-1414), widower of Maria.

== House of Sponheim with Vianden ==
- Elisabeth of Sponheim-Kreuznach(-Sayn) (1414–1417), daughter of Maria and Simon. She was married to (1) Count Engelbert III of the Mark (d. 1391), and (2) Rupert Pipan von Wittelsbach (d. 1397), eldest son of Rupert, King of Germany. She bore no children and the Sponheim and Vianden dynasty became extinct. A fifth of Sponheim-Kreuznach was willed to the Electorate of the Palatinate with Louis III, the rest to John V, Count of Sponheim-Starkenburg. Vianden was inherited by the grandsons of Adelaide of Vianden, Elisabeth's great-aunt.

== House of Nassau-Siegen ==
- Adolf I of Nassau-Siegen (1417-1420), grandson of Adelaide of Vianden, succeeded Elisabeth of Sponheim-Kreuznach, together with his brothers.
- John II of Nassau-Siegen (1417-1443), grandson of Adelaide of Vianden, succeeded Elisabeth of Sponheim-Kreuznach, together with his brothers.
- Engelbert I of Nassau-Siegen (1417-1442), grandson of Adelaide of Vianden, succeeded Elisabeth of Sponheim-Kreuznach, together with his brothers. He married Joanne of Polanen.
- John III of Nassau-Siegen (1417-1430), grandson of Adelaide of Vianden, succeeded Elisabeth of Sponheim-Kreuznach, together with his brothers.
- John IV of Nassau-Siegen (1442–1475), succeeded his father Engelbert I and his uncle John II, together with his brother. He married Mary of Looz-Heinsberg.
- Henry II of Nassau-Siegen (1442–1451), succeeded his father Engelbert I and his uncle John II, together with his brother.
- Engelbert II of Nassau (1475–1504), son of John IV. He married Cimburga of Baden (de) but had no legitimate issue.
- continue under House of Nassau that owned Vianden until the French Revolution

== Coats of arms of Vianden ==
Arms used before Philip I.

Arms used by Philip I (1252-1273). Based on the arms of Namur.

Arms used after Philip I, until Nassau. Based on the arms of Louvain/Perwez.

== Literature ==
- du Fays, Dominique (1987) La Maison de Vianden. University thesis, Liège
- Klein, René (1 October 2001). "Die Anfänge der Grafen von Vianden und Klerf". Hémecht (in German). 53 (4): 609ff.
- Milmeister, Jean (1 July 2000). "La lutte entre les comtes de Vianden et les comtes de Luxembourg aux XIIe et XIIIe siècles". Hémecht (in French). 52 (3): 345ff.
- Zimmer, John (1996) Die Burgen des Luxemburger Landes. Band I, Luxemburg
