= Elisabeth, Countess of Sponheim-Kreuznach =

German noblewoman

Elisabeth of Sponheim and Vianden, Countess of Mark (1360 - 31 July 1417) was a German noblewoman. She was the last countess at Sponheim of the rear line and countess of Vianden. Her parents were Simon III of Sponheim and Maria of Vianden. In 1381, she married Engelbert III of the Mark. After his death in 1381 she married Rupert Pipan, the oldest son of Rupert of the Palatinate. She was widowed a second time when Rupert Pipan died in 1397. On her father's death on 13 October 1414 she succeeded him as Countess of Sponheim-Kreuznach. She died childless on 31 July 1417. Upon her death, a fifth of her domain fell to the Elector Palatine, in accordance to an arrangement between Elisabeth and her father-in-law. The rest fell to Count John V of Sponheim-Starkenburg.
