= Herborn Castle =

Castle in Hesse, Germany

Coordinates: 50°40′57″N 8°18′22″E

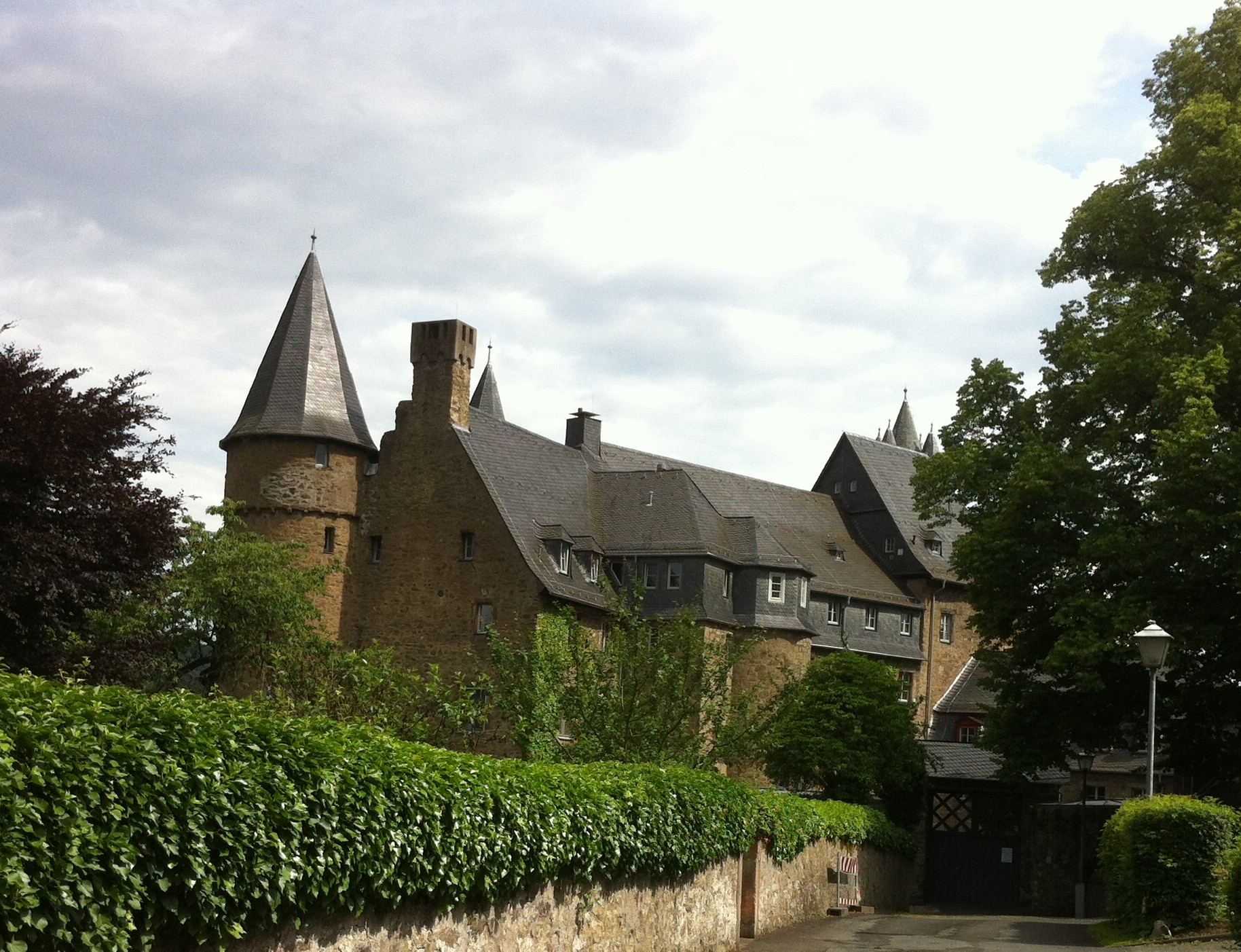
Herborn Castle

Herborn Castle (German: Schloss Herborn) is situated right above the city of Herborn, in the Lahn-Dill district of the state of Hesse, Germany.

== History ==
The Herborn castle was built as a Motte-and-bailey castle, as part of the fortification of the city of Herborn and was connected to the city wall surrounding the city. The castle was the center of the Herborn March, which was a fiefdom the Counts of Nassau received from the Landgrave of Hesse.

The first documentation of the castle dates back to the 13th century. In 1251 the castle was renovated and at the beginning of the 14th century it was transformed into a manor house.

John VI, Count of Nassau-Dillenburg founded his Calvinist university the Herborn Academy and placed it in the castle in 1584 . Some time after 1588, the school was moved to the old mayor house. In later years, years, the castle was rarely used by its owner.

From 1806 the castle was not in use and fell into ruin. It was eventually restored by Ludwig Hoffmann. Today it hosts the Theological Seminary of the Protestant Church in Hesse and Nassau.

Inside the castle there is a significant library of 68,000 works, at least 10,000 of which were printed before 1900. The library includes a collection of historical books as well printed materials from Herborn printers such as Corvin.

== Bibliography ==
- Hessendienst der Staatskanzlei (ed) (1990), "Schlösser, Burgen, alte Mauern", Wiesbaden, S. 173f., ISBN 3-89214-017-0
