= Johann Christian von Stramberg =

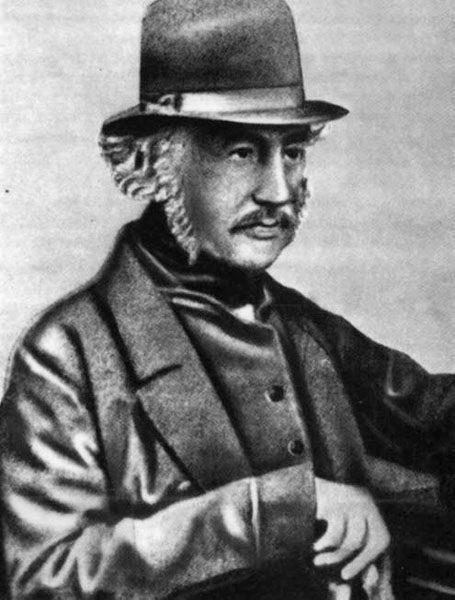
- Portrait of Stramberg from Stadtarchiv Koblenz.
- Born: 13 October, 1785; Koblenz
- Died: 20 July, 1868
- Notable work: Rheinischer Antiquarius

Johann Christian Hermenegild Joseph Franz de Paula Benjamin von Stramberg (13 October 1785 – 20 July 1868), commonly known as Johann Christian von Stramberg or Christian von Stramberg was a German historian.

He was born in Koblenz. He is best known as author of the 39-volume Rheinischer Antiquarius (1845–1871), with five of its volumes being issued after his death by Anton Joseph Weidenbach.

== Sources ==
- (in German) http://de.wikisource.org/wiki/ADB:Stramberg,_Johann_Christian_von
