= Land Wildenburg =

District of Germany

The Wildenburger Land (also called Wildenburgisches Land) is a historical landscape west of Siegen in the far north of Rhineland-Palatinate. It includes forest and mountain landscapes of the large natural landscape of Mittelsieg-Bergland, and to a small extent also Siegerland.

== History ==
The term Wildenburger Land goes back to the former Free Imperial Lordship of Wildenburg. In 1195 the area was ruled by the Lords of Reifferscheid. The Wilderburg Castle was first mentioned in records from 1328. The Lords of Wildenburg, descended from the Lords of Arenberg, whose seat was Wildenburg, died out in 1418, and the fief had sometimes been administered by an amtmann or bailiff. During the regency of Otto II, Count of Nassau-Siegen the fief was lost to the County of Sayn. The immediate imperial rule then passed to the Counts of Hatzfeld via an heir. The 1648 Osnabrück Peace Treaty restored the fief to the County Palatine, stating "The Rheingrafen are to be reinstated in their offices in Troneck and Wildenburg, as well as in the rule of Mörchingen, including all accessories and all other rights usurped by their neighbors." In 1806 Wildenburg fell to the Grand Duchy of Berg, and in 1815 to Prussia. Within Prussia, Wildenburg, together with the former Electorate of Cologne Amt Schönstein, formed the estate of Wildenburg-Schönstein. After World War II the area fell under the French zone of occupation. Since 1946, Wildenburger Land has belonged to Rhineland-Palatinate.

== Territory ==
The historical region today is in the modern Euskirchen district and is also part of the state of Rhineland-Palatinate. Part of the Hunsrück range is in the region. The largest local community is Friesenhagen. In addition to Friesenhagen, the current local communities of Birken-Honigsessen, Hövels, Katzwinkel, and the districts of Wissen north of the Sieg are located on the territory of the historical lordship of Wildenburg.

== Coat of Arms ==
The coat of arms of the Wildenburg lordship is Argent, three roses rouge, showing three red roses on a silver shield. Some municipalities such as Friesenhagen and Katzwinkel in the region have taken the Wildenburg roses into account for their municipal coats of arms.

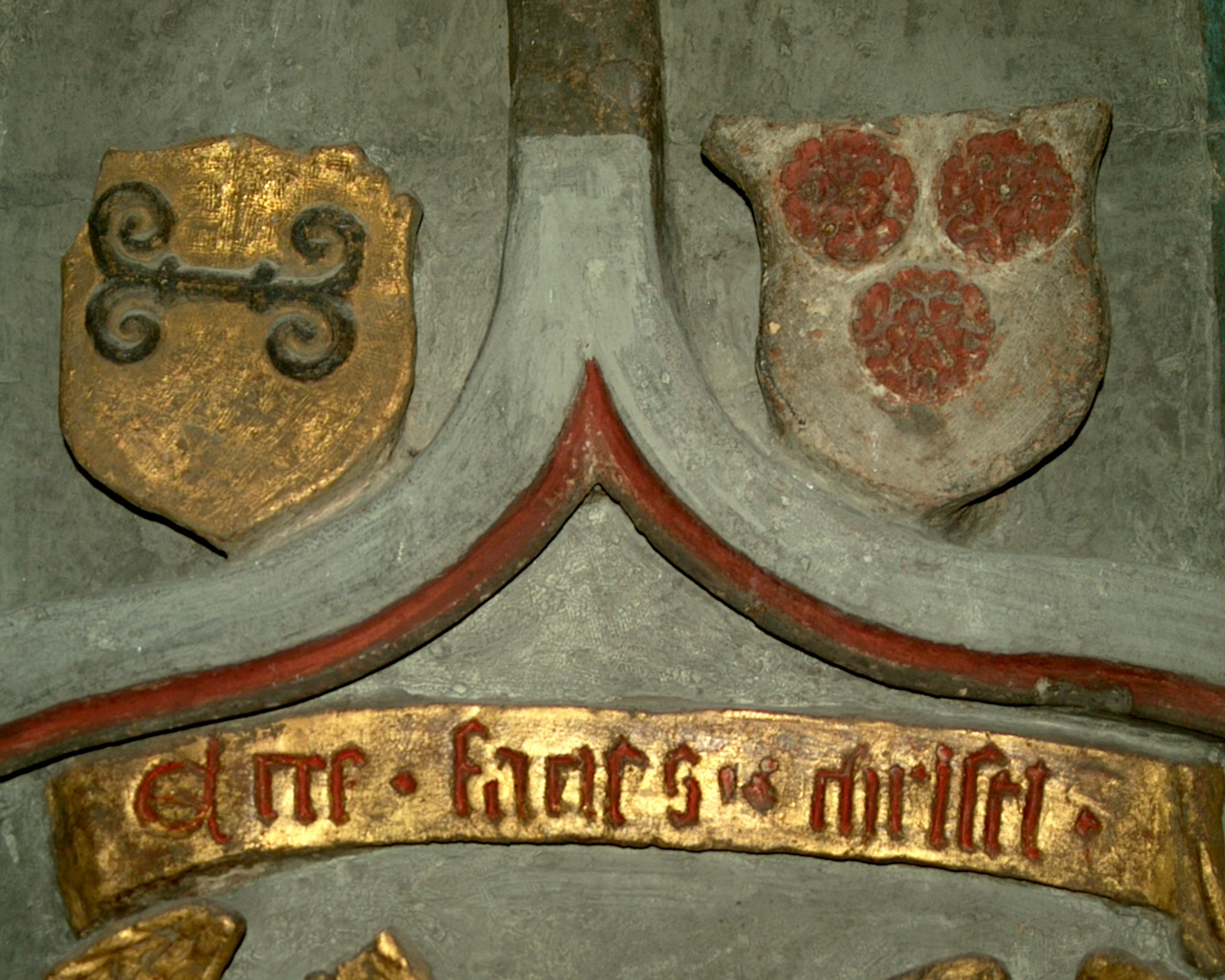
Arms of Wildenburg on the right

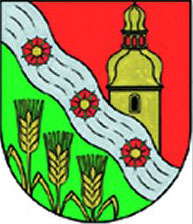
Arms of Friesenhagen

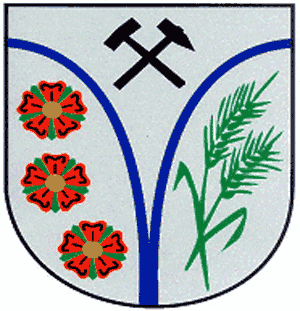
Arms of Katzwinkel
