= Castle of Ronse =

Former palace in Ronse, Belgium

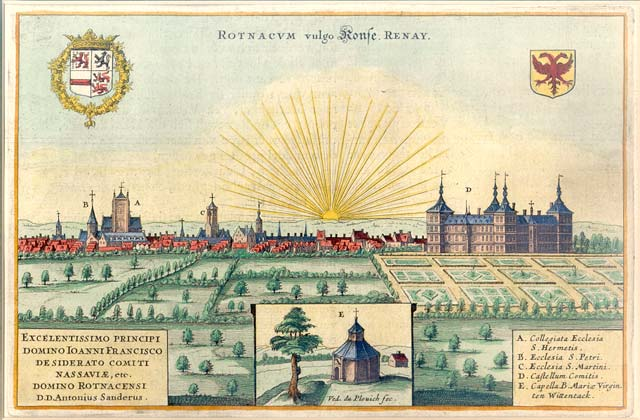
Castle of Ronse in the Flandria Illustrata around 1640

The Castle of Ronse (Dutch: Kasteel van Ronse or French: Château de Renaix) is a former palace in Ronse, Belgium. It was built in 1630 by John VIII, Count of Nassau-Siegen to serve as the ‘ancestral castle’ of the Catholic branch of the House of Nassau. It was designed in Renaissance style and modelled after the Luxembourg Palace in Paris. It was demolished in 1823. Except for some foundations below a 19th-century villa, nothing remains of what was once considered one of the most beautiful castles of the Southern Netherlands.

== History ==
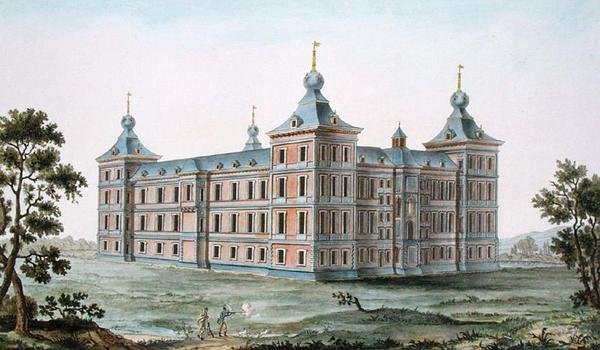
Exterior of the castle of Ronse by Goethgenhuer (1827)

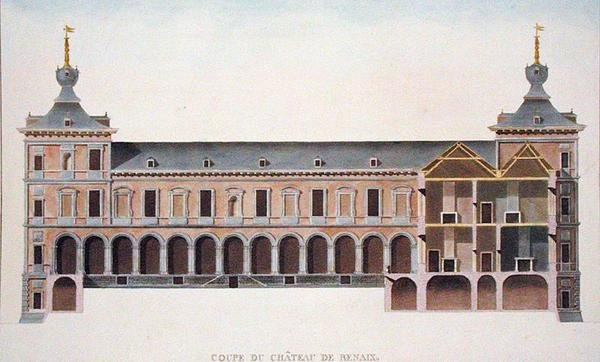
Cross section of the castle by Goethgenhuer (1827)

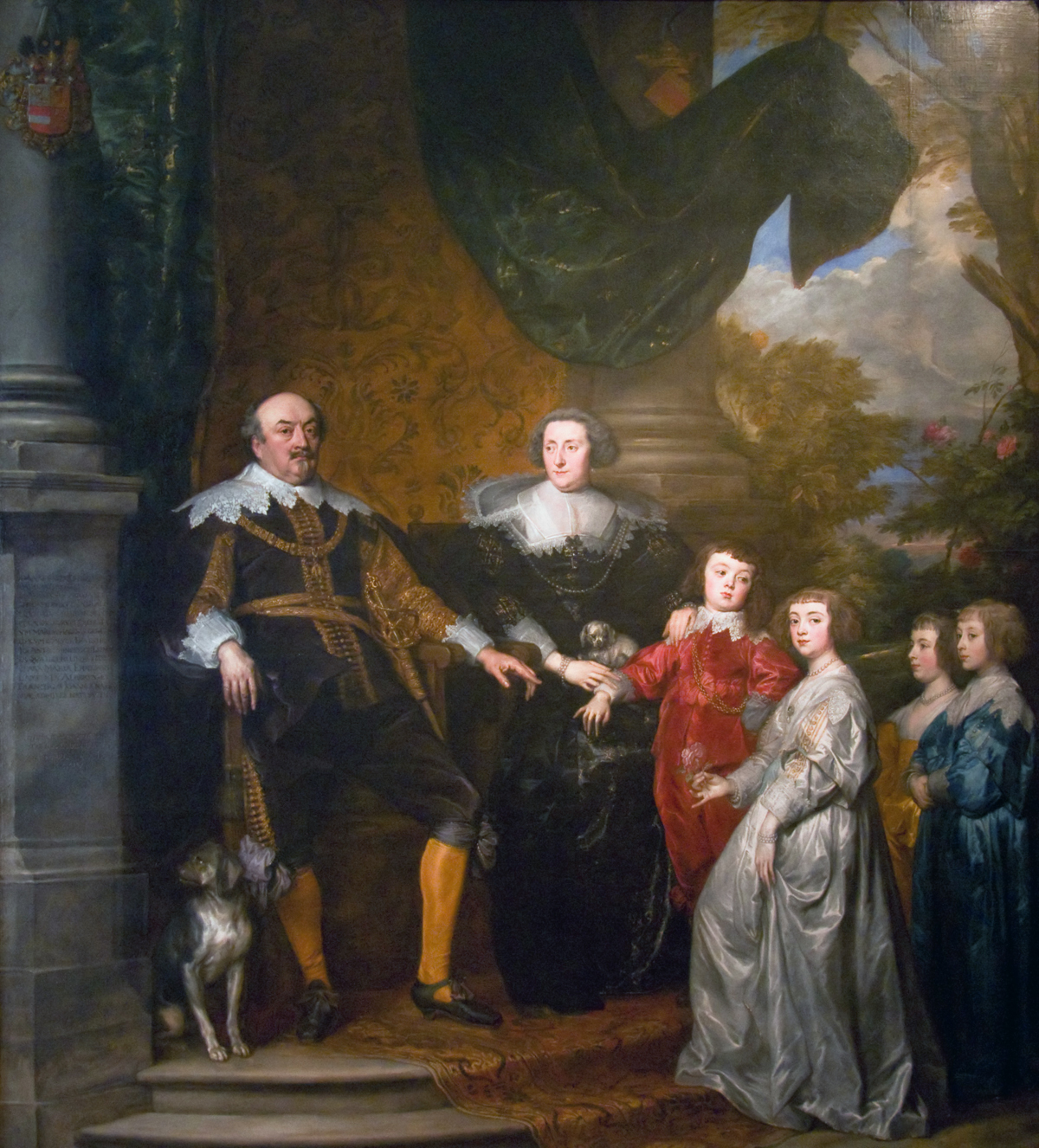
John VIII ‘the Younger’, count of Nassau-Siegen with his family by Anthony van Dyck (1634), now in Firle Place

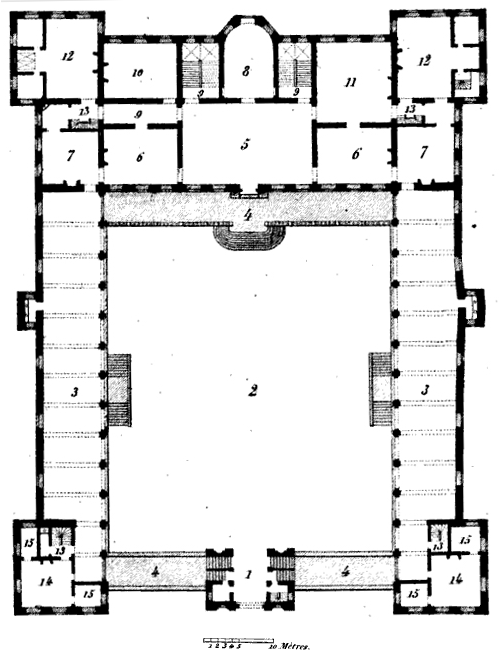
Plan of the castle by Goethgenhuer (1827)

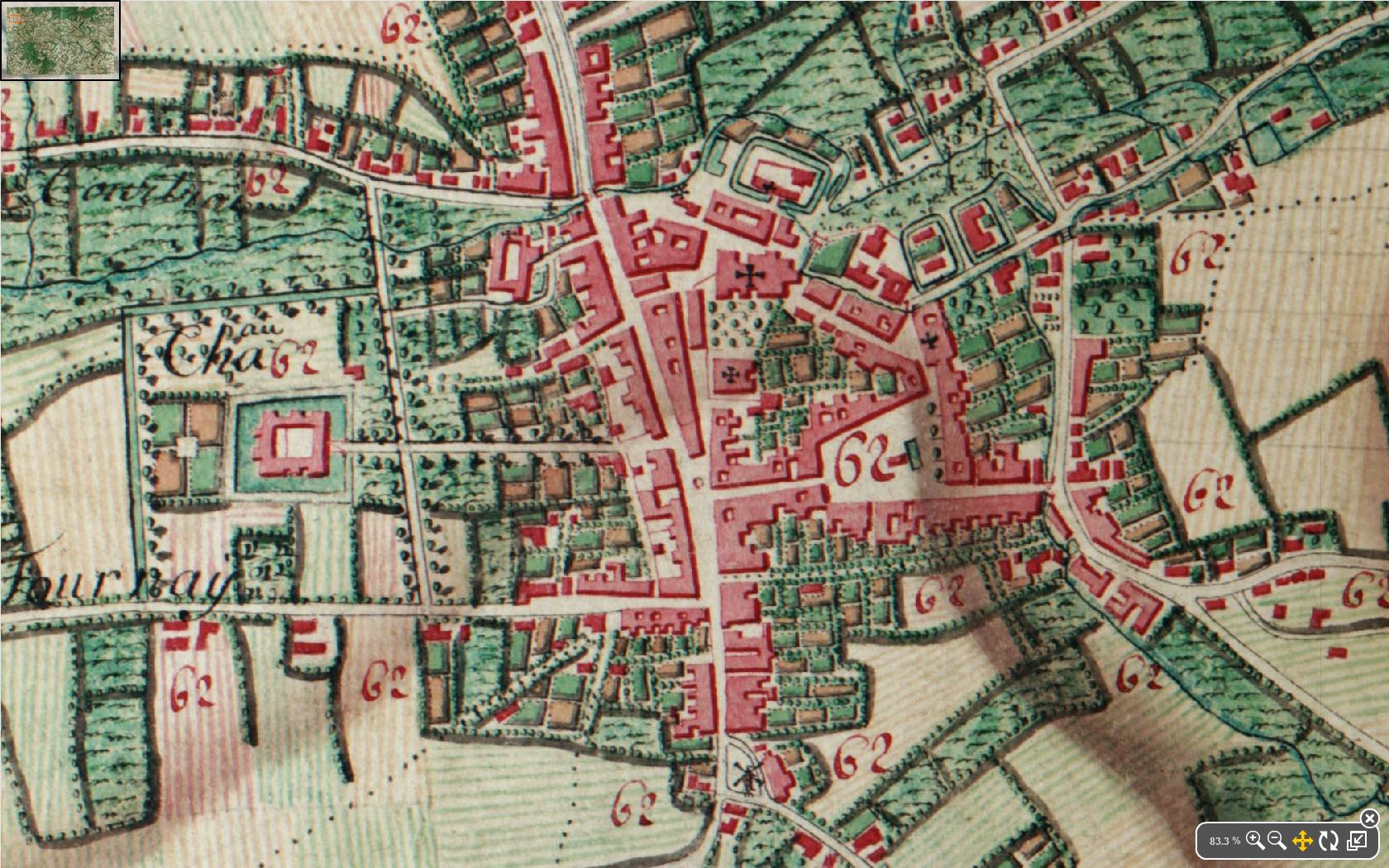
Location of the castle in Ronse on the Ferraris map (1775)

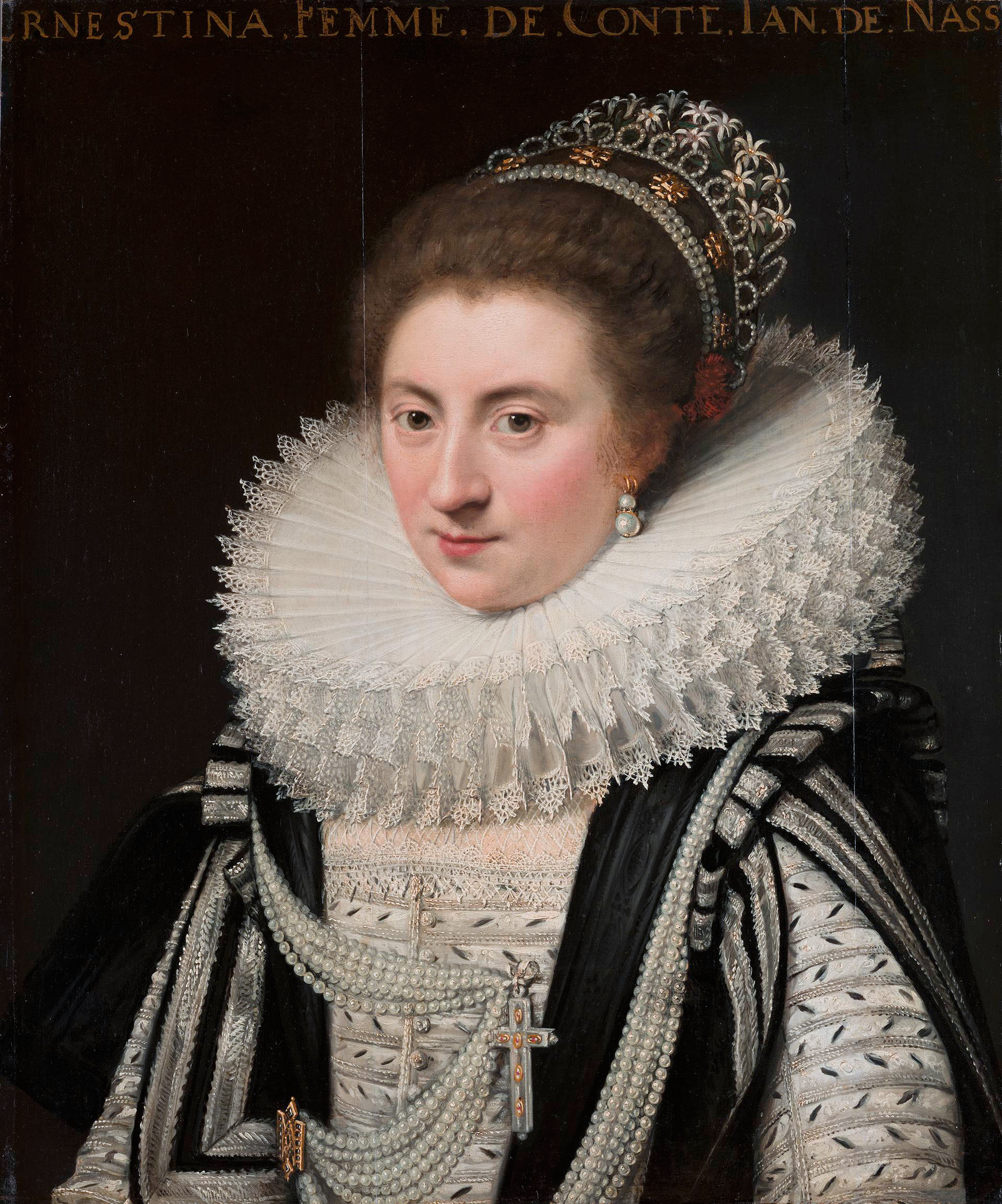
Ernestine Yolande de Ligne, wife of John VIII of Nassau-Siegen

=== Ancestral castle of Catholic branch of the House of Nassau ===
John VIII of Nassau-Siegen (1583–1638) was grand-nephew of Philip William, Prince of Orange (1554–1618), Frederick Henry, Prince of Orange (1584–1647), and elder brother of John Maurice, Prince of Nassau-Siegen (1604–1679). John had a successful career in the armies of the Holy Roman Empire, the Dutch Republic, France and Savoy. In 1612, he converted to Catholicism, settled in the Southern Netherlands and married Princess Ernestine Yolande de Ligne (1594–1668). He was considered by the Habsburg governors as the head of the House of Nassau. When prince Philip William died, he was granted his former properties: the Nassau palace in Brussels, the seigniories of Grimbergen, Zichem and Diest, and the barony of Breda.

On 28 March 1629, John VIII of Nassau-Siegen acquired the barony of Ronse from the last descendants of the Granvelle family. In April 1630, he started the construction of a palace modelled after the Luxembourg Palace in Paris and Huis Honselaarsdijk created by Frederick Henry, Prince of Orange (1584–1647). John VIII was also the first lord to reside regularly in Ronse.

The castle of Ronse became a monumental palace, intended to serve as the ancestral castle of the Catholic branch of the Nassau family in the Southern Netherlands. John VIII spent almost all his financial resources on the castle, which was completed after the plague epidemic of 1635–1636. Love for building was strong in the family, his protestant brother John Maurice constructed the Mauritshuis in The Hague, Sonnenburg castle in Brandenburg, and the Prinsenhof in Kleve.

The castle of Ronse was a U-shaped palace in late renaissance style on a square plan of 58 metres by 72 metres in five stories, consisting of a gatehouse, a central courtyard with an extensive residential wing and a chapel at the rear, two side wings, and four corner towers with a height of 37 meters. The castle was constructed of red brick with natural stone elements such as windows, arcades, profiled moldings, and corner blocks. The arrangement of the rooms was almost symmetrical, with two large apartments in the corners and the main public spaces, the entrance gate, and the chapel, on the central axis. The chapel was two stories high and featured a gallery on the first floor and an extended apse in the middle of the rear facade. The grand salon was located on the floor above the hall and opened onto the chapel.

Painted portraits of the entire Nassau family tree hung in the vestibule. The famous portrait of Jan van Nassau and his family, painted by Anthony van Dyck in 1634, hung in the left antechamber. This painting is now a masterpiece in the Cowper Collection in Firle Place, assembled by George Clavering-Cowper, 3rd Earl Cowper (1738–1789), who inherited the painting from Henry de Nassau d'Auverquerque, 1st Earl of Grantham (1675–1754). A detailed description of the former furnishings exists, detailing the furniture, paintings, and carpets that were present at the time.

John VIII of Nassau-Siegen was colonel of a German regiment and later became general of the cavalry in the Army of Flanders. After his death on 29 July 1638, his widow Ernestine Yolande de Ligne continued to live in the castle until 1663. After her death in 1669, the lords of Ronse hardly ever stayed in Ronse.

The successors were John's son, John Francis Desideratus, Prince of Nassau-Siegen (1627–1699), his sons William Hyacinth, Prince of Nassau-Siegen (1667–1743) and Emmanuel Ignatius of Nassau-Siegen (1688–1735). These heirs of John VIII of Nassau were entangled in prolonged and complicated disputes over the ownership rights of the barony, among other things, and ultimately the barony was sold to the counts of Merode-Westerloo (1745–1795), who, apart from their joyful entries, never actually stayed there.

=== Decline ===
After the Battle of Fleurus on 26 June 1794, the barony was abolished, and the castle was put up for sale after centuries of being owned by the illustrious families of Nassau-Siegen and Merode. From then on, the castle quickly began to decay into a ruin. Alexandre Louis van Hove bought the castle from the Merodes, but could not maintain the building alone. In 1821, he offered it for a modest sum to the city council as a hospital or secondary school, but his archrival Eugène Ferdinand Fostier, who had become mayor again in 1820, rejected the offer, further contributing to the castle's decay.

Napoleon's reign ushered in the first modern textile industry in Ronse, and the castle became the first location for the emerging textile industry. In 1803, the Lousbergs brothers introduced the first large cotton weaving mill in the city with 180 looms in the castle's cellars.

=== Demolition ===
Ultimately, the castle was sold in 1823 for 30,000 francs and demolished as a result of the feud between the conservative van Hove family, who had been the representatives of the lord during the ancien régime, and the progressive Fostier family.

=== Villa Snoeck ===
In 1844, notary Charles Alexander Snoeck was appointed to divide the assets of the van Hove heirs, and the 20-hectare estate was subdivided. He acquired a large number of lands himself and built several small houses in the 1850s, a tenement now known as the "Snoecksteegje". Through the subdivision of the former estate, the city began to expand beyond its old small core in the 1850s-60s for the first time.

In addition, Snoeck had a villa built for his son, the renowned musicologist César Snoeck, on the foundations and basement of the gatehouse of the demolished castle. Thus, the 17th-century barrel vaults in the basement with one-meter-thick whitewashed brick walls and door openings with sandstone casings were preserved. The backyard of Villa Snoeck was the former courtyard of the castle and is still bordered by the old walls or foundations of the castle.

== Literature ==
- Goethgebhuer, P.J. (1827). Choix des monumens, édifices et maisons les plus remarquables du royaume des Pays-Bas (in French). Gent. pp. 23–24, XXXIII–XXXV.
- Van de Merckt, G (1963). "Le Château des Nassau à Renaix". Annales du cercle historique et archéologique de Renaix en Tènement d'Inde XXXIII (in French). Ronse: Geschied- en oudheidkundige kring van Ronse en het Tenement van Inde: 86–98.
- Deconinck, Jacques (1984). "Le Château des Nassau à Renaix". Annales du cercle historique et archéologique de Renaix en Tènement d'Inde XXXIII (in French). Ronse: Geschied- en oudheidkundige kring van Ronse en het Tenement van Inde: 97–124.
- Ottenheyn, Koen (1998). "The Catholic Nassaus in Brussels and Their Buildings". Albert & Isabella - Essays. Brussels: Royal Museums of Art and History Brussels, Brepols. pp. 185–190. ISBN 2-503-50726-3.
