= Emmanuel Ignatius of Nassau-Siegen =

Spanish fieldmarshal

- Born: 6 January 1688; Roermond
- Died: 1 August 1735 (aged 47)
- Spouse: Charlotte de Mailly-Nesle (m. 1711, sep. 1716)
- Military career
- Allegiance: Spain; Austria
- Rank: Field marshal
- Known for: Regent of the Principality of Nassau-Siegen in 1727
- Awards: Order of the Golden Fleece (1715); Order of Saint Hubert (1720)

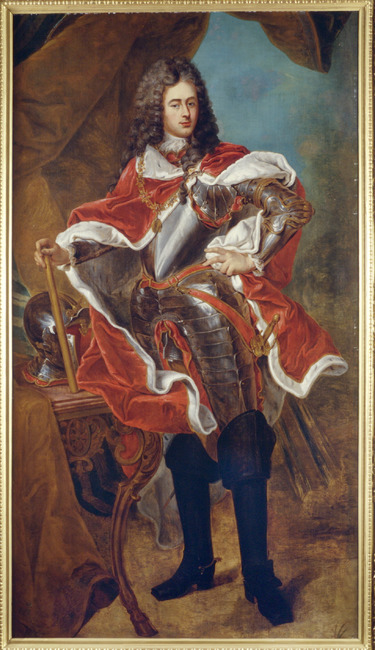
Portrait by François Eisen, 1715.

Emmanuel Ignatius of Nassau-Siegen (6 January 1688 - 1 August 1735), was a Fieldmarshal of the Spanish and Austrian Army, and Regent of the Principality of Nassau-Siegen in 1727.

Born in Roermond, he was the twenty-second child of John Francis Desideratus, Prince of Nassau-Siegen, but the ninth born from his third and last marriage with the French Isabella Clara du Puget de la Serre.

== Life ==
A member of the Catholic branch of the House of Nassau-Siegen, his status and that of his full brothers as dynastic members of the family was disputed because their parents' marriage was deemed morganatic. The marriage contract between John Francis Desideratus and Isabella Clara du Puget (signed one month after their marriage, on 13 March) stipulated that their offspring would have no higher rank than that of untitled nobles unless the male descendants of the Prince, through his two previous (and equal) marriages, became extinct. Despite this provision, after the death of John Francis Desideratus on 17 December 1699, Emmanuel Ignatius (who inherited the Barony de Renaix with his older brothers) and his surviving full-siblings assumed the title, name and arms of Nassau-Siegen. Their older half-brother William Hyacinth, Prince of Nassau-Siegen obtained from the Reichshofrat (in 1701) and the Reichskammergericht (in 1709) legal judgments denying dynastic titles of the Princes of Nassau-Siegen to the descendants of the John Francis Desideratus' third marriage because the marriage contract signed in 1669 was for a morganatic union. Despite this, Emmanuel Ignatius and his siblings all used the title of Prince or Princess of Nassau, Count or Countess of Katzenelnbogen, Vianden and Diez, Baron or Baroness of Beilstein and Ronse.

In Paris on 14 May 1711, Emmanuel Ignatius married with Charlotte (17 March 1688 - 17 March 1769), daughter of Louis II, Count de Mailly-Nesle. They had two sons, who died in infancy: Charles Nicholas (14 February 1712 - 1 July 1712) and Maximilian (29 August 1713 - 1714).

Almost since the beginning, the marriage was extremely unhappy. In 1716, Emmanuel Ignatius and Charlotte became officially separated; since them, she maintained a dissolute life in Paris, and her husband had her imprisoned in a monastery for adultery.

Emmanuel Ignatius pursued a military career, firstly in the Spanish army and since 1714 in the Austrian army. In 1718 he became a colonel and from 1723 he was Generalfeldwachtmeister, in 1733 being appointed a field marshal. He was also a captain in the army of Archduchess Maria Elisabeth, Governor of the Austrian Netherlands. In 1715 he was awarded the Order of the Golden Fleece and the Order of Saint Hubert in 1720.

In 1722, Emmanuel Ignatius and Charlotte were reconciled, and on 25 October of that year, she gave birth to a third son, Maximilian William Adolph, who Emmanuel Ignatius initially recognized as his own.

After the death of Frederick William Adolf, Prince of Nassau-Siegen in 1722, Holy Roman Emperor Charles VI authorized his fellow Roman Catholics, Emmanuel Ignatius and his two older brothers to receive part of the dynastic Nassau-Siegen inheritance. After the expulsion of William Hyacinth in 1727, the Emperor named Emmanuel Ignatius, administrator of the Principality of Nassau-Siegen. However, his power was significantly restricted because the real government was in the hands of the Electorate of Cologne; soon after, he returned to Brussels without further attempts to exercise authority in the principality.

The hoped for Catholic succession in Nassau-Siegen after the death of Prince Frederick William II in 1734 never took place, because both Emmanuel Ignatius and his brother Francis Hugo died shortly after and within months of each other in 1735.

On 26 August 1734 and close to his death, Emmanuel Ignatius rejected Maximilian William Adolph as his son, declaring him adulterous. Despite his posthumous, formal recognition by French courts (sentence du Chatelet, 31 January 1756), he was declared illegitimate in the Holy Roman Empire, within whose boundaries Nassau-Siegen was located, at the request of William IV, Prince of Orange by the Reichshofrat on 17 December 1744, that decision being confirmed by the Emperor on 15 October 1745. After he died in 1748, his pretensions were continued by his son Charles Henry but without results. Nassau-Siegen was eventually inherited by the Protestant Nassau-Diez branch of the princely family.
