= Karl Heinrich von Nassau-Siegen =

French-born fortune-seeker and adventurer

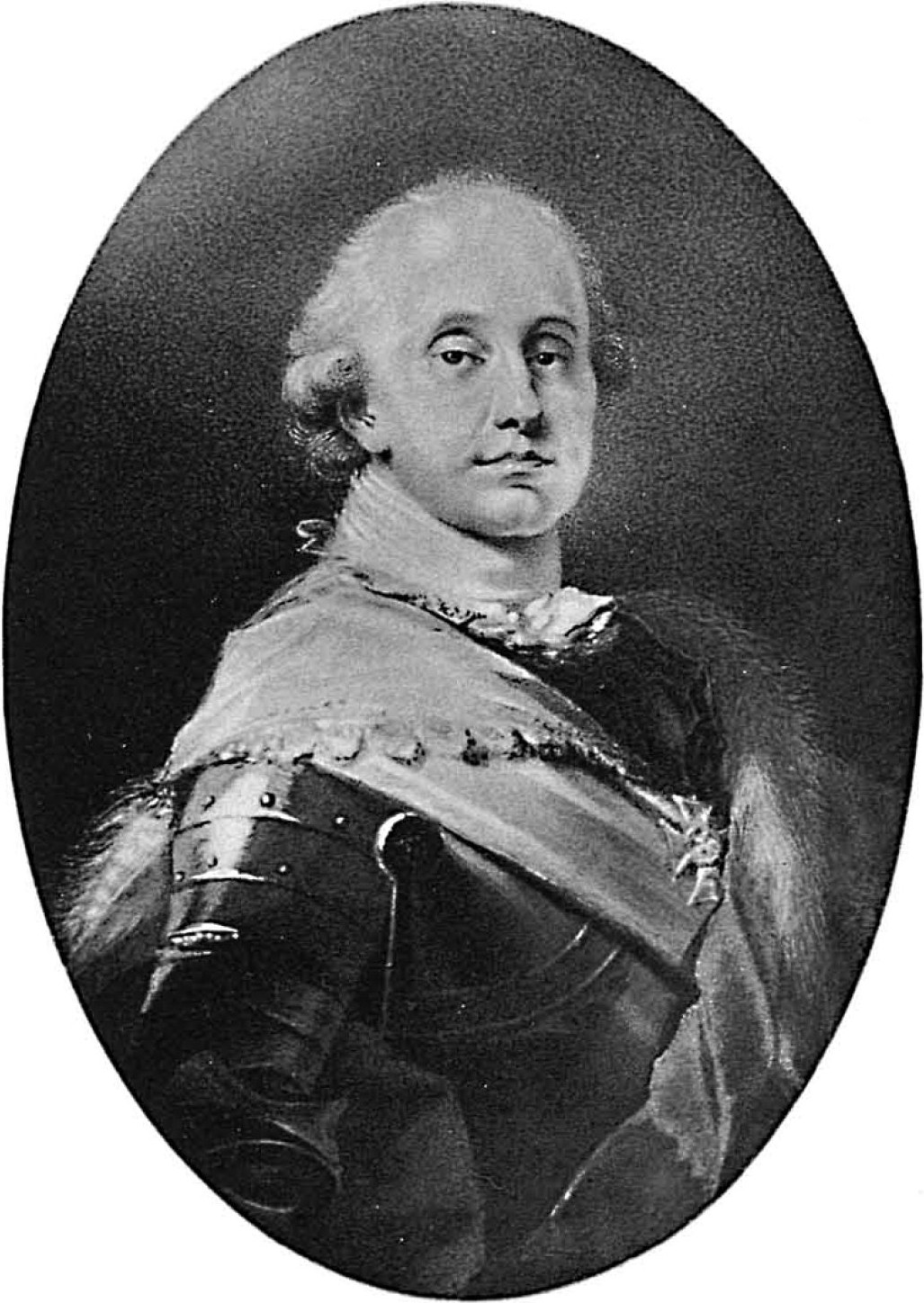
Prince of Nassau-Siegen

Karl Heinrich von Nassau-Siegen (French: Charles-Henri-Othon de Nassau-Siegen; 5 January 1743 – 10 April 1808), was a French-born fortune-seeker and adventurer active in Spain, Poland and the Russian Empire. A controversial figure, he was best known as Catherine II's least successful naval commander.

== Life ==
He was the son of Maximilien Guillaume Adolphe of Nassau-Siegen (d. 1748) and Amicie de Monchy (d. 1752). Charles Henry's family and title were disputed. His father was in 1756 posthumously recognized in France to be a legitimate son of Emmanuel Ignatius of Nassau-Siegen, in turn the youngest son of Prince Johan Franz of Nassau-Siegen by his third (and morganatic) wife, Isabella Clara du Puget de la Serre. Emmanuel Ignatius (d. 1735) had an unhappy union with the French noblewoman Charlotte de Mailly-Nesle (d. 1769) and became separated from her after a few years of marriage, during which they had two short-lived sons; years later (in 1722) they reconciled, and Emmanuel Ignatius recognized the third and only surviving son of his wife, the aforementioned Maximilien Guillaume Adolphe, as his own; however, shortly before his death (26 August 1734), he repudiated the child, declaring him adulterous.

Citing descent from a princely dynasty in the male-line, Charles Henry claimed that under French law he was entitled to style himself "Prince of Nassau-Siegen", but neither title nor rank was recognized by the House of Nassau-Siegen or the Holy Roman Empire, which had declared his official grandfather, Emmanuel Ignatius de Nassau-Siegen, legitimate but born from a morganatic marriage.

Charles Henry entered the French Navy at the age of 15, but led a dissolute life as a gambler at the royal courts of Vienna, Warsaw, Madrid and Versailles. Probably to escape his creditors, he joined the 1766 expedition of Louis Antoine de Bougainville to explore the South Pacific Ocean. On this expedition, he was able to develop his diplomatic skills in establishing contacts with the natives. For instance, in 1768 he was able to convince King Ereti of Tahiti of the peaceful intentions of the French.

As a French officer, Nassau-Siegen failed in his hastily prepared attack on the isle of Jersey (1779). For commanding the fireships at the siege of Gibraltar, Nassau-Siegen received from Spain three million francs and the dignity of Grandee of Spain. At Spa he met his future wife, Polish Countess Karolina Gozdzka, who was recently divorced Prince Sanguszko and the owner of a small estate in Podolia, then in the Polish–Lithuanian Commonwealth. In 1784, he became a citizen of the Polish–Lithuanian Commonwealth (indygenat).

In 1786 Nassau-Siegen arrived in Russia, seeking to make an impression on the powerful Prince Potemkin. He accompanied the Empress in her journey through the provinces of New Russia and was put in charge of the Dnieper Flotilla. After routing the Turks at Ochakov, during a siege of the city, he wrote to his wife that the spectacle of the Turkish fleet was "better than a ball in Warsaw".

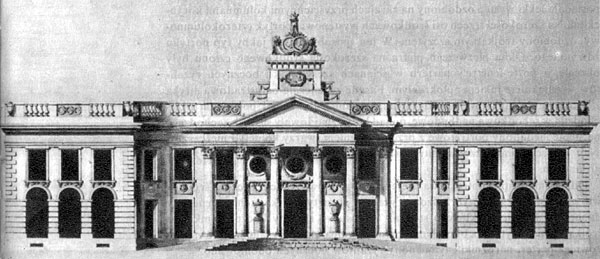
Gozdzki-de Nassau Palace in Warsaw, Poland

According to John Paul Jones (who served under Nassau-Siegen's command), the putative prince sought to exaggerate his success to the utmost. He won the Order of St. Andrew after the Battle of Svensksund (1789) defeating the Swedes, but failed in stopping the Swedish fleet from breaking out in the Battle of Vyborg Bay in July 1790 (he was too late to join the battle).

He was on the 9th of July 1790 decisively defeated by the Swedes at the second Battle of Svenskund. Despite this defeat, Nassau-Siegen was promoted to admiral by the Tsarina. Nassau-Siegen's military incompetence forced him to seek retirement. He left Russia in 1792 for the Rhine, to fight the French Revolution. But after the Peace of Amiens in 1802, he returned to France, where he solicited without success a position in Napoleon's army. He returned to his estate at Tynna in Podolia in 1808, which was seized by Russia after the Partitions of Poland.

The first plans of Russia's attack on India through Khiva and Bukhara are ascribed to Nassau-Siegen.

He had married in 1780 Karolina Gozdzka (1747-1807), but had no children. The location of his former palace in Warsaw has been since parcelled and transformed into residential units and park along Dynasy Street, the name of which is derived from De Nassau.

== Decorations ==
- 1774: Order of the White Eagle
- 1788: Order of St. George
- 1789: Order of St. Andrew

== Sources ==
- Velichko, Konstantin I.; Novitsky, Vasily F.; Schwarz, Aleksey V. von; Apushkin, Vladimir A.; Schoultz, Gustav K. von (1912). Военная энциклопедия Сытина [Sytin Military Encyclopedia] (in Russian). Vol. VII: Воинская честь — Гимнастика военная. Moscow: Типография Т-ва И. Д. Сытина. pp. 99–101.
- "Нассау-Зиген, Карл Генрих Николай Отто" . Brockhaus and Efron Encyclopedic Dictionary (in Russian). 1906.
