= Gozdzki-de Nassau Palace =

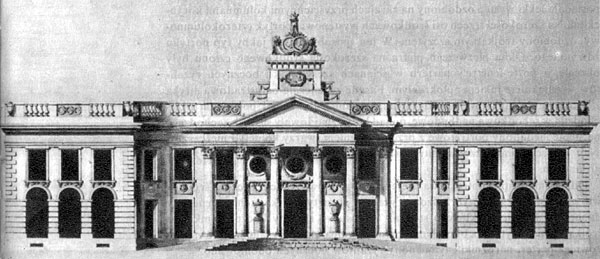
- The palace after reconstruction in 1780, burned down in 1788
- Interactive map of the Gozdzki-de Nassau Palace area

General information
- Location: Warsaw
- Coordinates: 52°14′18″N 21°01′16″E
- Construction started: Wooden: 1709–1733
- Completed: Masonry: 18th century
- Destroyed: Fires in 1776/1777, 1788
- Client: Bernard Stanisław Gozdzki
- Owner: Bernard Stanisław Gozdzki (first owner)

Design and construction
- Architects: Efraim Schröger (design of the palace-garden complex, c. 1760); Szymon Bogumił Zug (design of the palace reconstruction in 1780)

The Gozdzki-de Nassau Palace, originally known as the Lubomirski Palace and also called the Dynasowski Palace, was formerly a palace in Warsaw, Poland. The building was located within the jurydyka of Aleksandria, near Krakowskie Przedmieście street. Today, its site is occupied by two tenement houses at Sewerynów Street, numbers 4 and 6.

== History ==
=== Lubomirski Palace ===
Józef Karol Lubomirski married Teofila Zasławska in 1683, the sole heiress of the Zasławski and Ostrogski fortunes, including the Aleksandria jurydyka established in 1670 by her brother, Aleksander Janusz Zasławski. The original Lubomirski Palace was constructed between 1709 and 1733. After the death of Józef Karol’s son, Aleksander Dominik Lubomirski, in 1720, the jurydyka passed to his sister Marianna, who married Paweł Karol Sanguszko, the Lithuanian Court Marshal. In 1754, their son Janusz Aleksander Sanguszko sold the jurydyka to Jan Małachowski, the Grand Chancellor of the Crown, who in the same year transferred it to Barbara Małachowska, wife of Bernard Stanisław Gozdzki (d. 1774), the Voivode of Podolia, of the Doliwa coat of arms. Bernard Stanisław Gozdzki already owned a masonry palace, known as the Chomętowski Palace, which he had acquired in 1748 from Dorota Chomętowska (née Tarło), widow of Field Hetman Stanisław Chomętowski. This transaction was contested by the Chomętowski family, leaving the palace unused and deteriorating until around 1780, when it was handed over by court order to Dominik Pieniążek.

=== Gozdzki Palace ===
As a result, Gozdzki demolished the Lubomirski manor and built in its place a 15-axis masonry palace with two side wings and service quarters. Behind the palace, a vast terraced garden extended down to the Vistula River, at the base of which lay a long T-shaped pond connected to the river. In front of the palace stretched a large courtyard reaching Aleksandria Street, enclosed by a fence flanked by long wooden outbuildings, with pavilions at the entrance. Since Gozdzki rarely resided in Warsaw, the palace fell into disrepair. The voivode’s entire estate, including the palace, was inherited by his only daughter, Karolina, from her mother Barbara Małachowska. In 1773, Karolina married Janusz Modest Sanguszko, but the marriage ended in divorce in 1778. Meanwhile, the Gozdzki Palace burned down in 1776 or 1777.

=== Gozdzki-de Nassau Palace ===
In 1780, she remarried, this time to the adventurer Charles (Karl, Karol) de Nassau-Siegen, who had recently arrived in Poland. Prince de Nassau and his wife undertook its reconstruction, creating a palace deemed more splendid by contemporaries. The design, originally prepared for Prince Sanguszko, was by Szymon Bogumił Zug. The palace became associated with the Polonized version of de Nassau’s name, "Dynasowski," and the entire area—including the palace, outbuildings, garden, and courtyard—came to be known as "Dynasy," a name that persists in Warsaw’s topography to this day. Prince de Nassau-Siegen led an extensive political, military, and cultural life, frequently traveling across Europe, primarily residing in Poland, France, and Austria. In 1784, he arranged the performance of Pierre Beaumarchais’s The Marriage of Figaro in Paris, and the following year, with the author’s permission, organized its Polish premiere at the Royal Castle, later staging it at his and his wife’s palace. However, the Gozdzki-de Nassau Palace burned down again in 1788. Only the southern side wing survived, becoming a ruin inhabited by the poor for many years. The prince, constantly engaged in new political ventures and facing financial difficulties, did not attempt to rebuild. Soon after, he and his wife left for Saint Petersburg. Princess Karolina died in 1804, leaving her husband as her sole heir. Her estate included the palace in Warsaw and properties in Podolia, such as the palace in Tynna. Prince Charles de Nassau-Siegen died in 1808, and their combined estate passed to their ward, a Greek woman named Elizabeth Feloe Ekonom (c. 1794–1872), whom they had met in Crimea. She married Russian notable Pavel Butiagin (Boutiaguin) and later Aleksander Cetner.

In 1815, Zygmunt Vogel was commissioned by Butiagin to rebuild the Dynasowski Palace and transform the garden into a landscape style, though this plan was never realized. The Butiagin children regained rights to the palace ruins and property in 1842, selling it to Karol Schoeneich, who in turn sold it to Count Seweryn Uruski in 1845. The count used the preserved southern wing as the basis for a department store designed by Maria Franciszek Lampi in 1846. On the rest of the site, he built a circular bazaar with stalls and an internal street named Sewerynów.

== Bibliography ==
- Bartoszewicz, Julian (1853). Distinguished Polish Men of the 18th Century: Historical Portraits by Julian Bartoszewicz. Saint Petersburg.
- Fiedorowicz, Jacek Aleksander (2013). "Dynasy - A Forgotten Fragment of Warsaw". Kronika Warszawy. 148.
