= Francisco de Moncada, 3rd Marquis of Aitona =

Spanish diplomat, soldier and writer

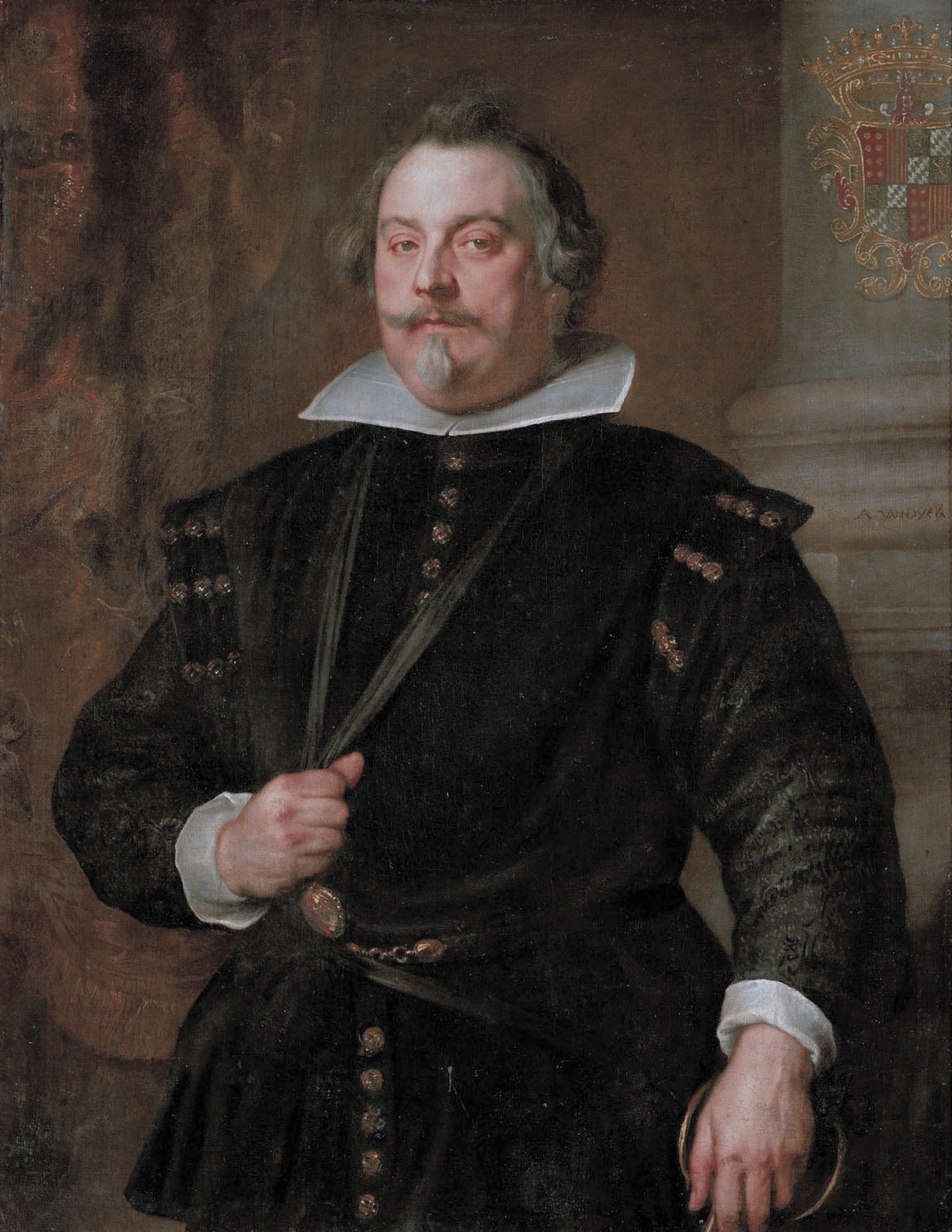
Portrait of Francisco de Moncada by Anthony van Dyck while Francisco de Moncada was interim Governor in the Spanish Netherlands. Kept at the Kunsthistorisches Museum, Vienna, Austria

Francisco de Moncada (in Catalan: Francesc de Montcada i Montcada), 3rd Marquis of Aytona, (1586–1635) was a Spanish diplomat, soldier and writer of the early 17th century. He was Ambassador in the Holy Roman Empire and interim Governor of the Spanish Netherlands, a general and commander of the Spanish-Flemish armies.

== Early life ==
Moncada was born in Valencia to Gastón de Moncada, 2nd Marquis of Aitona, (1554–1626), Ambassador to Rome Viceroy of Sardinia, 1590–1595, Viceroy of Aragon, 1603–1610, and his wife Catalina de Moncada (her maiden name) baroness of Callosa. He was taught as a child of the great works of both chivalry and the troubadours, especially Joanot Martorell's Tirant lo Blanch which influenced Miguel de Cervantes so much that he praises it in Don Quixote.

== Government service ==
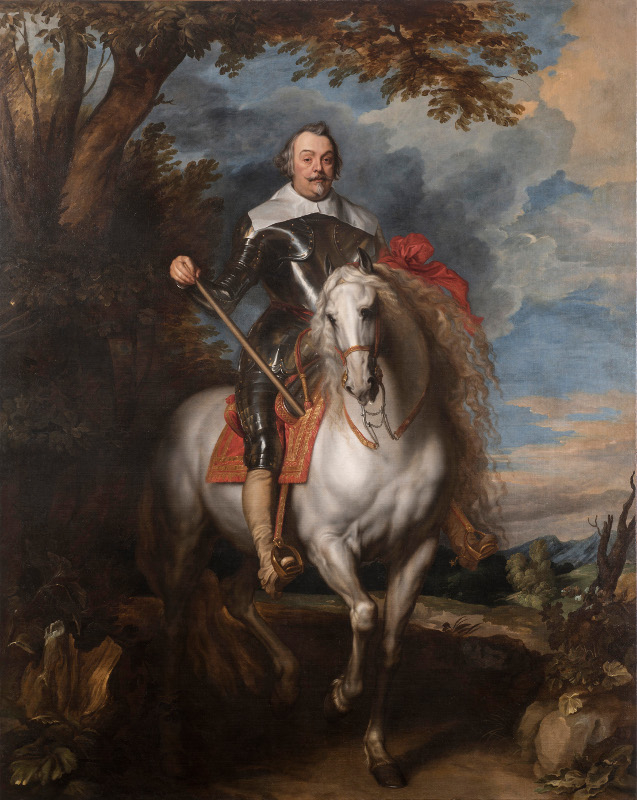
Equestrian Portrait of Francisco de Moncada (c. 1630-32), by Anton van Dyck (Museu de Belles Arts, Valencia).

Moncada served as the Spanish ambassador to the Holy Roman Emperor between 1624 and 1629, and had a very good relationship with Albrecht von Wallenstein. The Emperor Ferdinand II was very impressed by him.

He then served as a counselor to Princess Isabella Clara Eugenia of Spain, regent of the Spanish Netherlands. While serving in Brussels he tried to convince King Philip IV of Spain to transfer the general management of affairs in his Netherlands possessions to Brussels and remove any responsibility for such matters from the government in Madrid. His proposals to give the various peoples in the Netherlands, still under Habsburg rule, more say in their governmental affairs were rejected.

He was made the commander-in-chief of the Spanish navy in the Netherlands in 1630. On 12–13 March 1631, his seamen under command of Count Jan VIII van Nassau-Siegen, were defeated at the Battle of the Slaak. In 1632 he was put in charge of all Spanish forces in the Netherlands. In 1634 he was made interim-governor of the Spanish Netherlands on the death of Spanish Netherlands Governess Isabella Clara Eugenia in December 1633.

During this period, he commissioned a seated and equestrian portrait from Anthony van Dyck.
He died in 1635 of a fever, caught at the successful siege of the Schenkenschanz near Goch, North Rhine-Westphalia, Germany, near the current Dutch-German border.

== Literary work ==
Moncada wrote Expedicion de Catalanes y Argoneses al Oriente about the Catalan Company. This history gives an account of the followers of Roger de Flor in their cooperation and fighting the Byzantine Empire and later their capture of the Duchy of Athens. Editions: (Barcelona, 1623; Madrid, 1777, 1805, 1883; around 97 pages, Paris, 1841, in "Tesoro de los historiadores espanoles").

Moncada also wrote Vida de Anicio Manlio Torquato Severino Boecio. This Roman politician from an illustrious imperial family of the 6th century, was known as Anicius Manlius Severinus Boëthius, commonly called Boethius. This work was not published until after Moncada's death, first going to press at Frankfurt, Germany in 1642.

== See also ==
- Juan de Moncada, his uncle
- Battle of the Slaak
