= Battle of the Slaak =

1631 naval battle of the Eighty Years' War

- Part of the Eighty Years' War
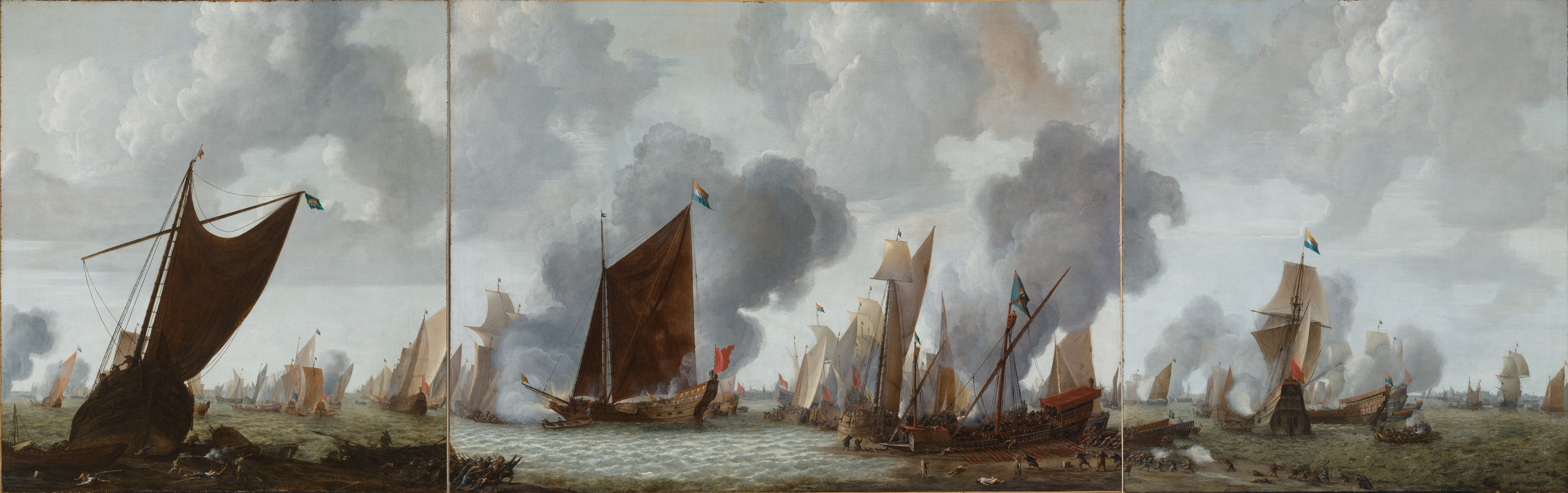
- Battle at the Slaak, 12 and 13 September 1631
Date	12 and 13 September 1631
Location	Slaak of Volkerak channel near Goeree-Overflakkee (present-day the Netherlands) 51.6312°N 4.2004°E
Result	Dutch victory

Belligerents
Spain	Dutch Republic

Commanders and leaders
(Spain) Don Marquis of Aytona (Spain) Count Jan van Nassau Siegen	(Dutch Republic) Vice-Admiral Marinus Hollare

Strength
5,500 soldiers, 35 ships, 60 vessels	50 vessels

Casualties and losses
83 vessels sunk, destroyed or captured, 1,500 killed, wounded or drowned, 4,000 prisoners	Light

The naval Battle of the Slaak (12 and 13 September 1631) was a Dutch victory during the Eighty Years' War. The Dutch prevented the Spanish army from dividing the Dutch United Provinces in two.

== Background ==
In reaction to an overland Dutch attempt to capture Dunkirk earlier in the year, Infanta Isabella Clara Eugenia of Spain, governing the Southern Netherlands for Philip IV of Spain, ordered a Spanish army transported on a fleet of barges to attempt to occupy the islands of Goeree and Overflakee by surprise. In particular, the Spanish wished to overpower the large fortresses on either side of the Volkerak Strait. The fortress on the continental side had special propaganda value, as it was a newly founded town named Willemstad after William the Silent; more importantly, Spanish occupation would have allowed a blockade of the Dutch main naval port Hellevoetsluis located to the direct north of Overflakee on the island of Voorne; and the isolation of the province of Zealand from its confederate provinces.

== Battle ==
A Spanish fleet of ninety vessels and 5,500 men under the direction of Don Francisco de Moncada, Marquis of Aytona, but in fact commanded by Count Jan van Nassau Siegen, a catholic cousin of the Calvinist Dutch House of Orange, mostly consisting of small transports, departed from Antwerp.

The project could not be kept a secret however and a Dutch task force of fifty ships, also largely consisting of small rivercraft but containing some larger flyboats, under Zealandic Vice-Admiral Marinus Hollare, intercepted the fleet in the Eastern Scheldt. Seeing their intended route blocked, the Spanish first tried to capture the more southern island of Tholen instead, to show something for their efforts, but this attempt was thwarted by a regiment of two thousand English and Scots mercenaries under the command of Colonel Thomas Morgan from the continental fortress of Steenbergen who marched at low tide through the shallow sea to the island, arriving just in time to deter a landing. Van Nassau in his desperation then took the bold decision to attempt to sneak past the Dutch fleet during the night and so achieve the original goal after all.

The Spanish movement however was noticed despite a fog; despite their small number the Dutch first allowed the enemy fleet to pass completely before cutting them off. Once this was achieved the Dutch suddenly attacked the Spanish from behind in the Slaak of Volkerak channel and were routed. Hundreds drowned as they tried to escape the ships and those that did escape were captured by the waiting Dutch and English troops ashore. Over 4,000 troops and seamen were captured along with the majority of ships. Van Nassau himself and two ships accompanying him managed to escape to Antwerp; it is not exactly known how many others escaped, perhaps as much as a third of his fleet.

== Aftermath ==
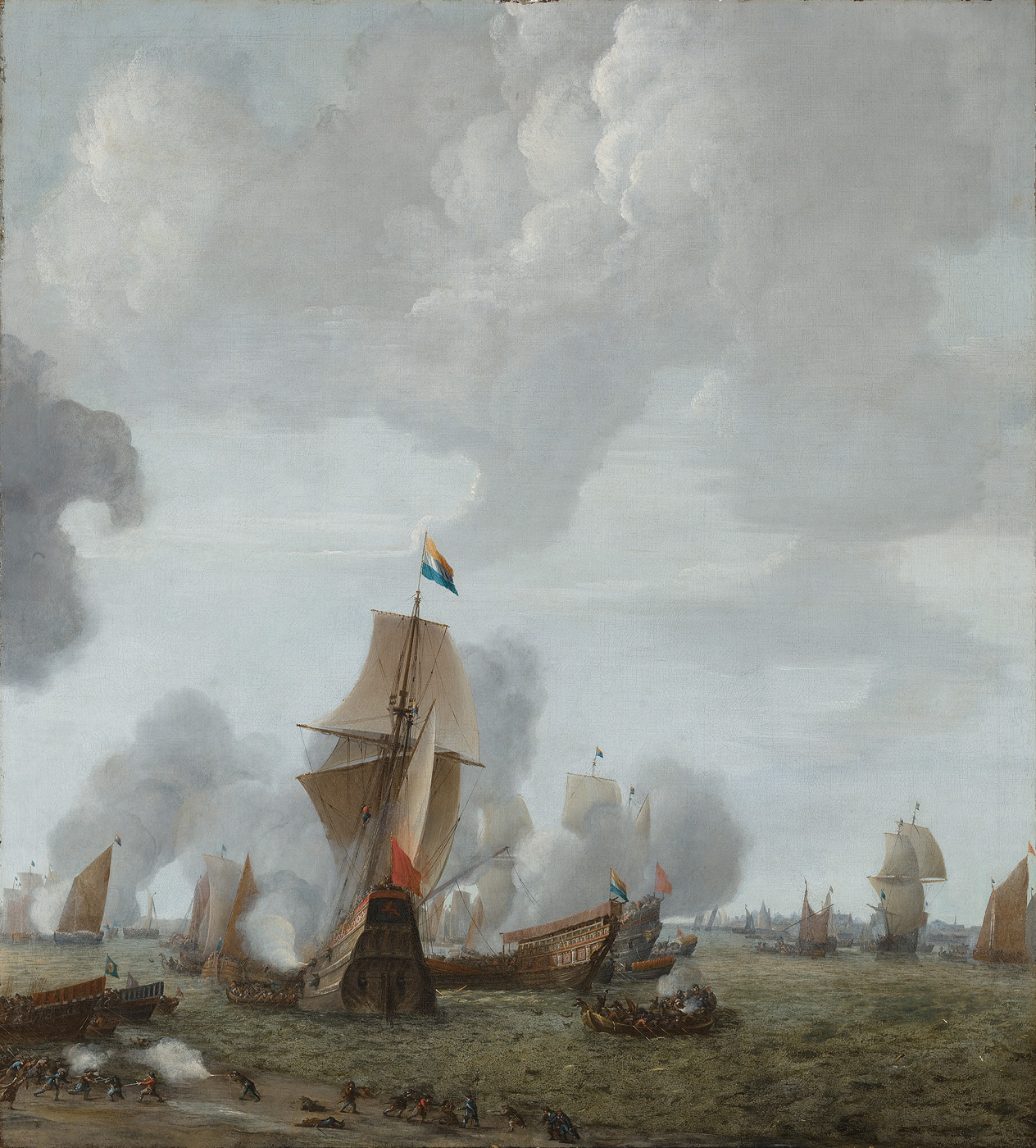
The battle of the Slaak

The Admiralty of Amsterdam suggested throwing all prisoners into the sea — until that time the officially prescribed method for the Dutch to dispense with enemy combatants captured at sea — to deter further attempts, but stadtholder Frederick Henry of Orange forbade this. One of the captains distinguishing himself was the later Lieutenant-Admiral Johan Evertsen, his brother the later Lieutenant-Admiral Cornelis Evertsen de Oude also participated. The defeat was one out of a series of setbacks for the Habsburg policy in the Thirty Years War waged the same time in the larger German theatre; it influenced a decision in 1632 to reach a peace settlement between the Habsburgs and the Republic — the peace talks were unsuccessful however.

== Bibliography ==
- Dupuy, Trevor and Rachel Dupuy (1986). The Encyclopedia of Military History from 3500 B.C. to the Present. New York: Harper and Row.
- Hoeven, Marco van der, ed. (1997). Exercise of Arms: Warfare in the Netherlands, 1568-1648. Brill.
