= Portrait of Francisco de Moncada =

Painting by Anthony van Dyck

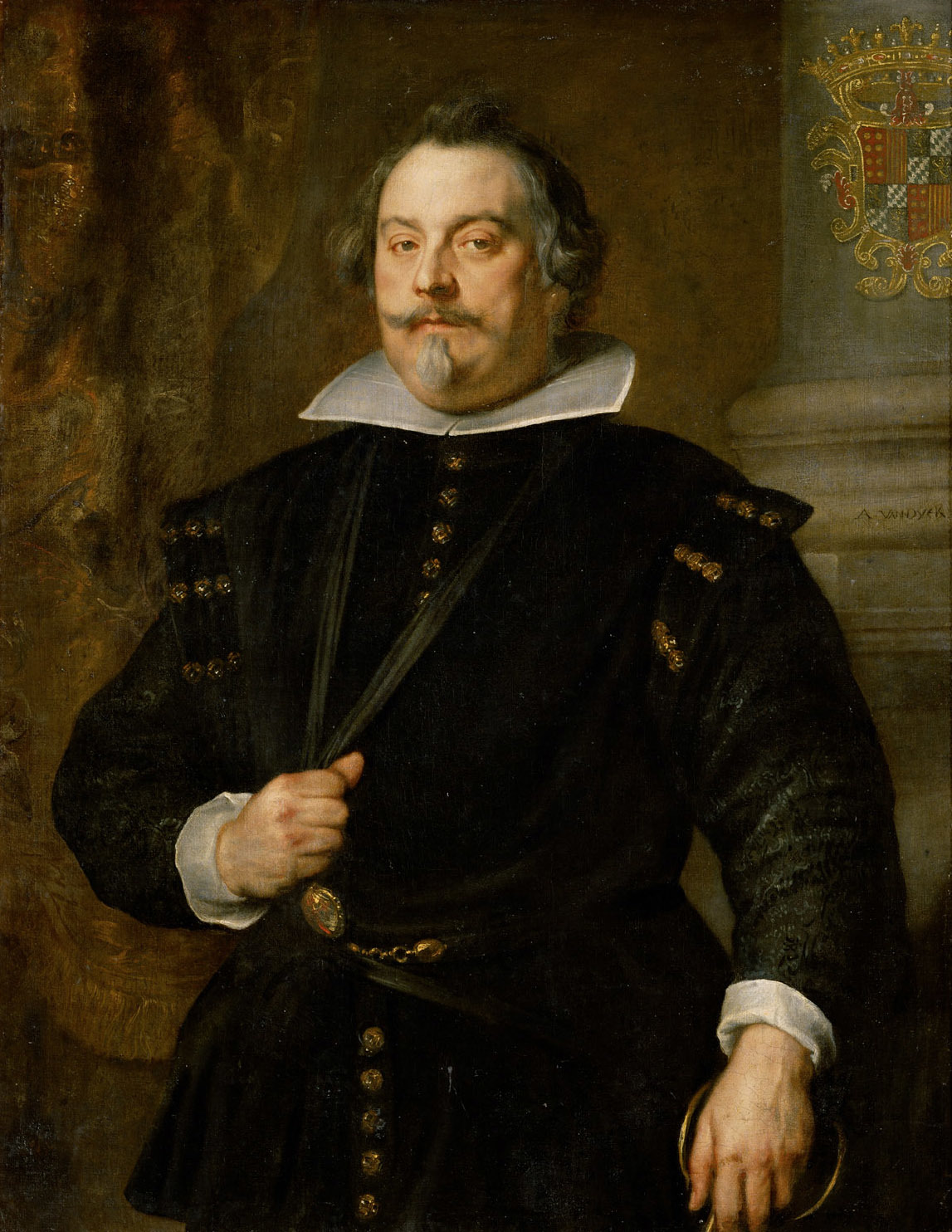

Portrait of Francisco de Moncada is a 1634 oil on canvas portrait of Francisco de Moncada by Anthony van Dyck, commissioned simultaneously with the equestrian portrait of the same subject now in the Louvre. Since at least 1720 it has been in the Kunsthistorisches Museum in Vienna.
