= Equestrian Portrait of Francisco de Moncada =

Painting by Anthony van Dyck (Louvre)

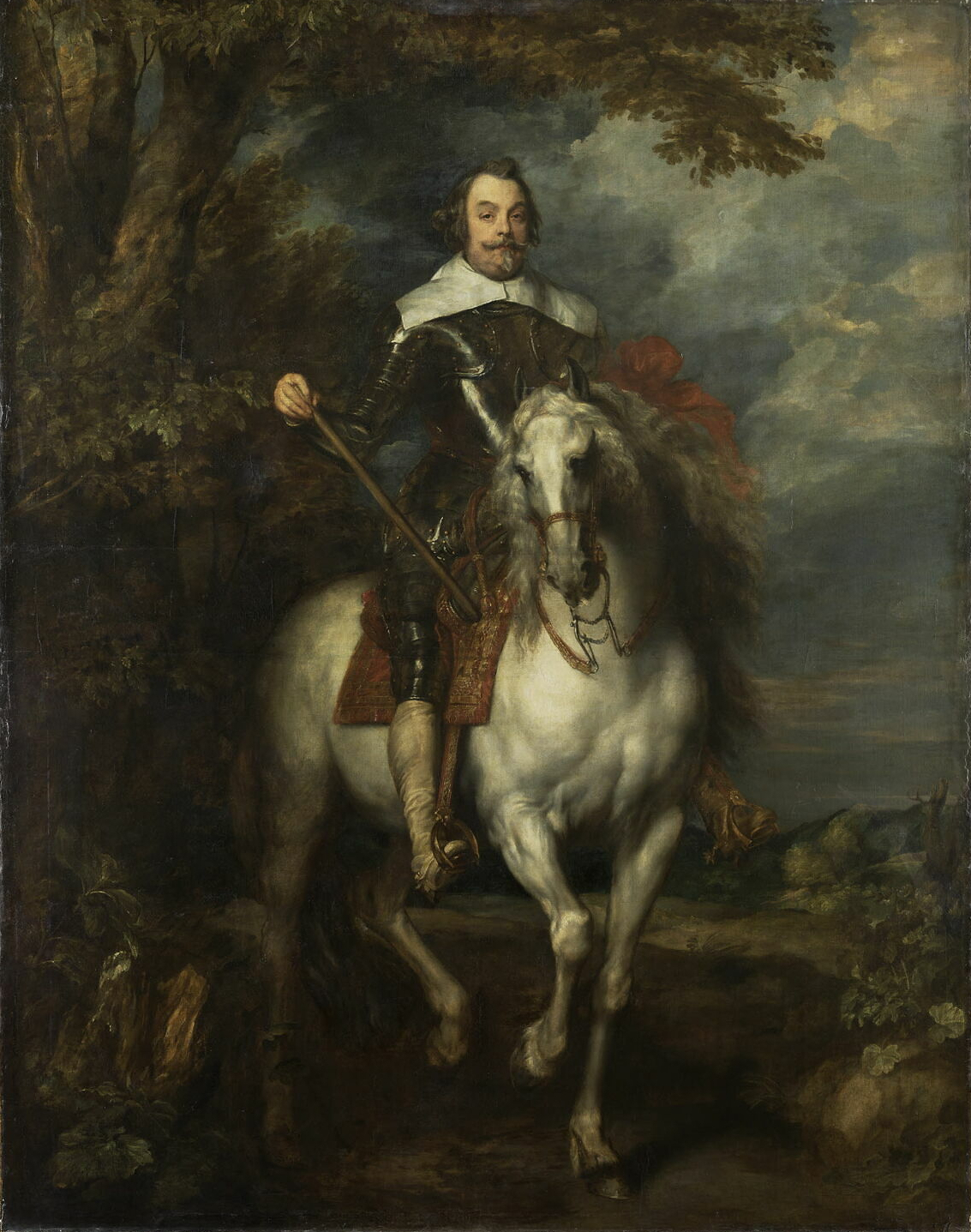

Equestrian Portrait of Francisco de Moncada is a 1634 oil on canvas painting by Antony van Dyck, one of his most famous portraits, now INV 1240 in Room 850 (d) of the Louvre Museum, which acquired it from the Palazzo Braschi in Rome in 1798.

It shows Francisco de Moncada, who for one year was governor of the Spanish Netherlands. It was one of a pair of portraits of Moncada simultaneously commissioned in 1634, just after his return to his native Flanders after a stay in London - the other is in the seated Portrait of Francisco de Moncada (Kunsthistorisches Museum). He probably copied the pose from a drawing of a horse-rider seen face on by his former master Peter Paul Rubens, whilst Charles Coypel in turn produced a copy of the work.

The two best-known versions of the portrait are in Spain: one in the Museu de Belles Arts in Valencia and the other in the collection of the Duke of Alba. The first, made by van Dyck himself, was acquired by Manuel Montesinos y Molina and remained in his family until 1941 when it was donated to the Real Academia de Bellas Artes de San Carlos to be exhibited in the Valencian art gallery. The second, a copy of the van Dyck, would have been commissioned by the mother of the Marchioness of Carpio, Catalina Fernández de Córdoba, and, after the extinction of the house of Haro, it passed with the titles and other properties to the Dukes of Alba.

Other copies are those made by Géricault and Watteau that are in the Stedelijk Museum Amsterdam and the Lousada collection, respectively.

== See also ==
- List of paintings by Anthony van Dyck
