= John VIII of Nassau-Siegen =

German nobleman and militarist

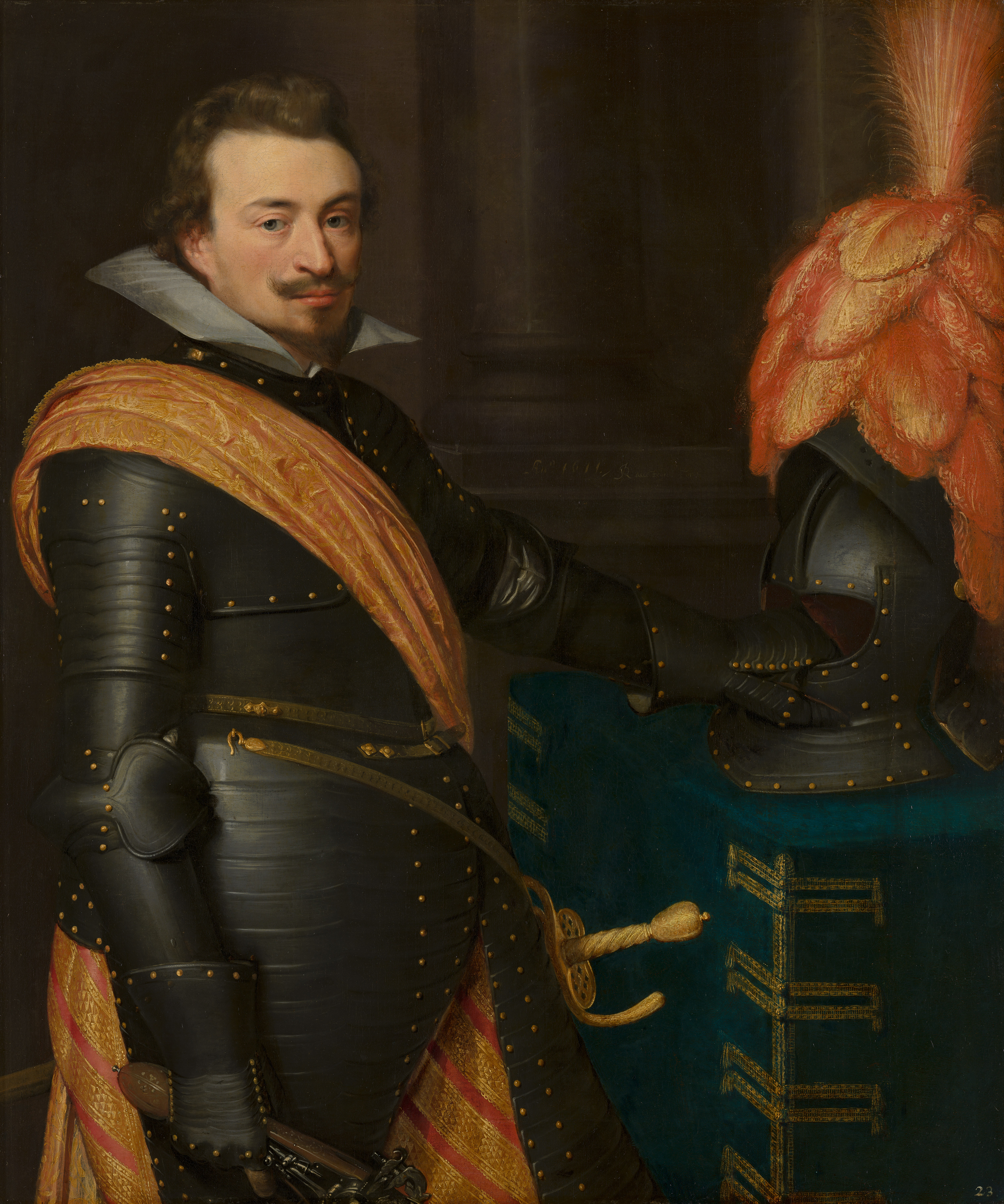
- Portrait by Jan van Ravesteyn
- Born: 29 September 1583; Dillenburg
- Died: 27 July 1638 (aged 54); Ronse
- Noble family: House of Nassau
- Spouse: Ernestine Yolande de Ligne d'Amblise
- Father: John VII, Count of Nassau-Siegen
- Mother: Magdalene of Waldeck-Wildungen

John VIII, Count of Nassau-Siegen (Jan or Johan; Dillenburg, 29 September 1583 – Ronse, 27 July 1638) was a German nobleman and militarist of the 17th century.

== Life ==
John VIII, Count of Nassau-Siegen, Katzenelnbogen, Vianden and Dietz, Marquis of Monte-Caballo, Baron of Ronse and Beilstein, was the second son of John VII, Count of Nassau-Siegen and Countess Magdalene of Waldeck-Wildungen.

He was educated in Herborn, Kassel and Geneva. In 1610 he participated in the Dutch States Army in the conquest of Jülich.

On 25 December 1613, much to the horror of his family, he openly converted to Catholicism and entered in the service of the army of Charles Emmanuel I, Duke of Savoy. After the death of his elder brother, John Ernest in September 1617, he claimed his rights, but his father chose a Protestant successor. When his father died in 1623, John VIII occupied Nassau-Siegen at the head of a Habsburg Army and started the Contra-Reformation.

In 1624 he became a Knight in the Order of the Golden Fleece.

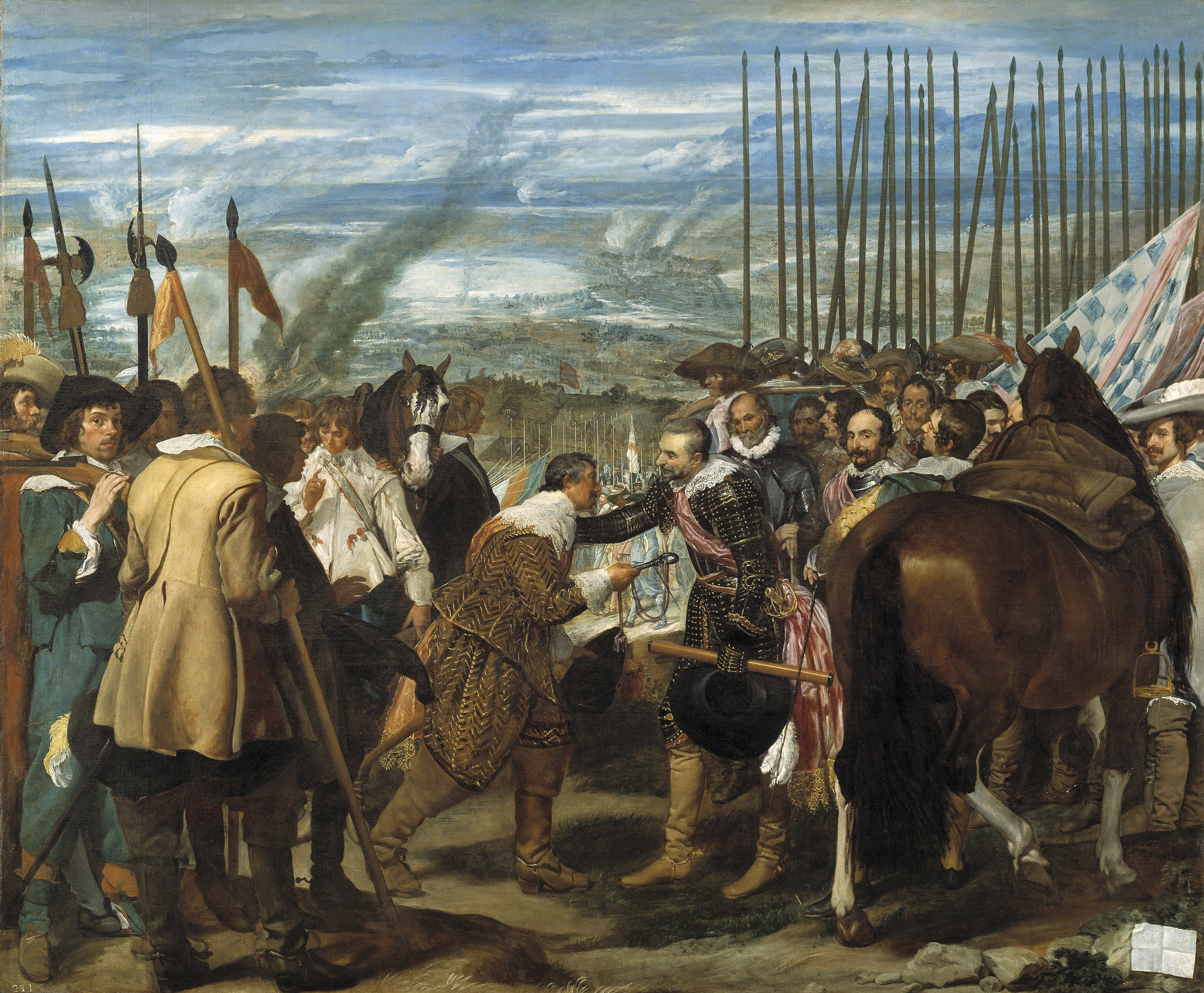
The Surrender of Breda by Velázquez

In 1625 he participated in the Siege of Breda. Breda was defended by his second cousin Justinus van Nassau and held out for eleven months before surrendering. John VIII of Nassau-Siegen is depicted in the famous painting The Surrender of Breda by Diego Velázquez, third from the left in the Spanish camp, looking directly at the spectator.

On 1 July 1629, John became an Imperial Field Marshal and acquired the barony of Ronse, where created the Castle of Ronse modelled after the Luxembourg Palace in Paris. It was considered one of the most beautiful palaces of the Netherlands.

In 1630 he was captured by the Dutch Army, however, he was released later that year for a huge bail. In 1631, he was in charge of the Spanish-Flemish Fleet defeated by the Dutch and Scots and English mercenaries, at the Battle of the Slaak, fighting on behalf of the Spanish Governor Francisco de Moncada, 3rd Marquis of Aitona, (1586–1635).

In 1632, Nassau-Siegen was conquered by the Swedes, after which his half-brother John Maurice of Nassau-Siegen re-introduced Protestantism.

John VIII died in 1638 and was succeeded by his only son Johan Frans Desideratus, who had to cede part of Nassau-Siegen to the Protestant branch of the family.

== Marriage and children ==
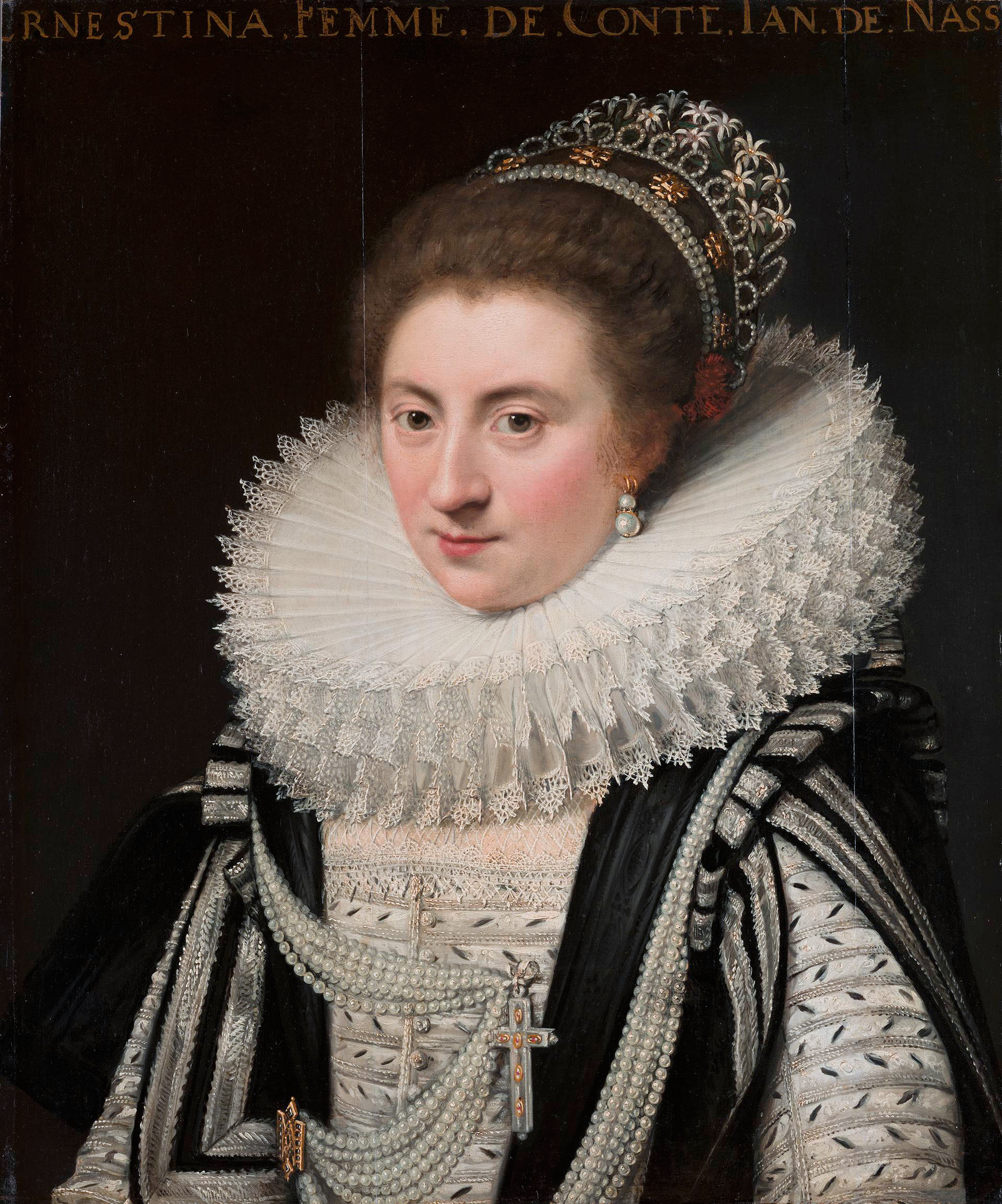
His wife, Ernestine Yolande de Ligne

John was married in Brussels on 13 August 1618 to the Catholic princess Ernestine Yolande de Ligne (1594–1668), daughter of Lamoral de Ligne, Prince d'Espinoy. They had six children together:

- Maria (1619–1620)
- stillborn daughter (1620)
- Clara Maria (1621–1695), first married her cousin Prince Albert Henri de Ligne in 1634, and secondly Claude Lamoral, 3rd Prince of Ligne in 1642
- Ernestine Charlotte (1623–1668), married in 1650 with Maurice Henry, Prince of Nassau-Hadamar
- Lamberta Alberta Gabrielle Ursula (1625–1635)
- John Francis Desideratus (Nozeroy, 1627 – Roermond, 1699), Count of Nassau-Siegen

== Ancestors ==
Ancestors of John VIII of Nassau-Siegen

16. John V, Count of Nassau-Siegen
8. William I, Count of Nassau-Siegen
17. Elisabeth of Hesse-Marburg
4. John VI of Nassau-Dillenburg
18. Bodo III, Count of Stolberg-Wernigerode
9. Juliana of Stolberg
19. Anna of Eppstein-Königstein
2. John VII, Count of Nassau-Siegen
20. John IV, Landgrave of Leuchtenberg
10. George III, Landgrave of Leuchtenberg
21. Margaret of Schwarzburg
5. Elisabeth of Leuchtenberg
22. Frederick I, Margrave of Brandenburg-Ansbach
11. Barbara of Brandenburg-Ansbach-Kulmbach
23. Sophia Jagiellon
1. John VIII, Count of Nassau-Siegen
24. Philip I, Count of Waldeck
12. Henry VIII, Count of Waldeck
25. Joanne of Nassau-Siegen
6. Philip IV, Count of Waldeck
26. William of Runkel
13. Anastasia of Runkel
27. Irmgard of Rollingen
3. Magdalene of Waldeck-Wildungen
28. Gerlach III of Isenburg-Grensau
14. Salentin VII of Isenburg-Neumagen
29. Hildegard of Sierck
7. Jutta of Isenburg-Neumagen
30. Henry of Hunolstein
15. Elisabeth of Hunolstein
31. Elisabeth of Bolchen

John VIII of Nassau-Siegen House of Nassau Born: 29 September 1583 Died: 27 July 1638
Preceded by John VII	Count of Nassau-Siegen; 1623–1638	Succeeded by John Francis Desideratus
