= John Francis Desideratus, Prince of Nassau-Siegen =

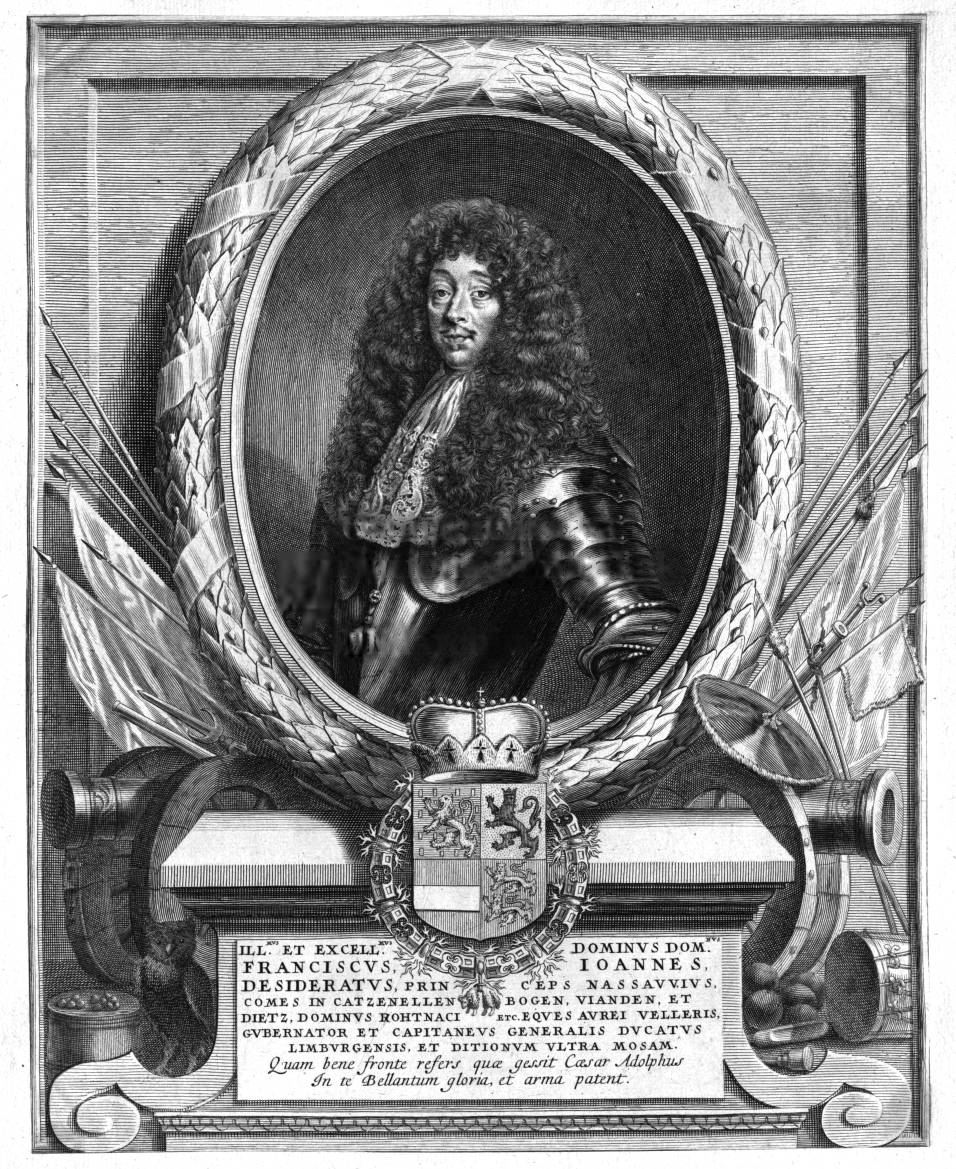
- John Francis Desideratus of Nassau-Siegen
- Born: 28 July 1627; Nozeroy
- Died: 17 December 1699 (aged 72); Roermond
- Noble family: House of Nassau
- Spouses: Johanna Claudia of Königsegg-Rotenfels-Aulendorf; Eleonore Sophie of Baden-Rodemachern; Isabella Clara du Puget de la Serre
- Father: John VIII of Nassau-Siegen
- Mother: Ernestine Yolande de Ligne d'Amblise

John Francis Desideratus (28 July 1627 – 17 December 1699) was count of Nassau-Siegen and stadtholder of Limburg and Upper Guelders.

== Life ==
John Francis Desideratus was the only son of Count John VIII of Nassau-Siegen, who had converted to Catholicism, and Ernestine Yolande de Ligne d'Amblise. He succeeded his father in 1638 as count of Nassau-Siegen, but had to cede a part of the county to the Protestant branch of the family in 1648. He kept fighting his Protestant neighbours and suppressing the Calvinists in his territory. His reign was marked by bad management and debts.

Like his father, John Francis Desideratus was a general in Spanish service. In 1652, he was elevated to Imperial Prince and became a Lord in the Order of the Golden Fleece. In 1661, he was promoted to Knight in the Order of the Golden Fleece. From 1665 to 1684, he was Spanish stadtholder of Limburg and from 1680 to 1699 also of Upper Guelders. He lived a large part of his life in Roermond, where he died in 1699. At his death he was succeeded by his eldest surviving son William Hyacinth.

== Marriages and children ==
John Francis Desideratus married 3 times:

In Vienna on 14 May 1651 he married Countess Johanna Claudia of Königsegg-Rotenfels-Aulendorf (23 August 1632 – 28 November 1663), Lady-in-waiting of Empress Eleonora Gonzaga during 1648–1651. They had ten children:

- Marie Leopoldine Eleonora Gabriella (27 September 1652 – 2 June 1675), married to Maurice Henry, Prince of Nassau-Hadamar.
- Ernestine Claudia Margaretha Felicitas (27 November 1653 – 22 November 1654).
- A son (b. and d. 25 February 1655).
- Ernestina Eleonora Antonia (January 1656 – 4 November 1675), a nun in Metz.
- Clara Juliana Margarethe Felicitas (November 1656 / October 1657 – 9 October 1727), Canoness of the High Noble Imperial Abbey at Thorn and of the St. Waadru Convent at Mons.
- Albertina Anna Gabriella (13 August? 1658 – 26 August 1718), Canoness of the Noble Abbey of St. Aldegonde at Maubeuge.
- Maria Donata Gabriella (8 August 1660 – 9 August 1660).
- Louise Carolina Anna (July or August 1661 – August 1664).
- A daughter (b. and d. 21 August 1662).
- Stillborn son (28 November 1663).

In Rodemachern 31 May 1665 he married Margravine Marie Eleonore Sophie of Baden-Baden in Rodemachern (1641 – 19 April 1668). They had three children:

- Francis Fortunatus (7 April 1666 – 12 July 1672).
- William Hyacinth, Prince of Nassau-Siegen (3 April 1667 – 18 February 1743).
- Maria Eleonora Ernestina (19 April 1668 – 28 September 1669).

In Brussels on 9 February 1669 he married Baroness Isabella Clara du Puget de la Serre (1651 – 19 October 1714). They had ten children:

- Alexius Andreas Anton Ferdinand Christian (29 June 1673 – 22 March 1734), Canon at Cologne, (1690), Dean of the St. Peter Church and Chancellor of the University at Louvain (10 December 1692), Deacon at Cologne (14 November 1694), Priest (25 November 1695), Canon at Liège (December 1695), Abbot of the St. Croix de Bouzonville Monastery, Titular Archbishop of Trapezopolis (1728), Knight of the Order of Malta (1697).
- Joseph (1674 – 14 December 1674).
- Charlotte Sophia Johanna (21 February 1675 – 29 May 1676).
- Joseph Maurice Karl (17 May 1676 – 29 January 1677).
- Maria Philippina (2 July 1677 – 16 December 1678).
- Francis Hugo Ferdinand Gereon (18 October 1678 – 4 March 1735), Vice-Regent of Nassau-Siegen (1727); married to Countess Leopoldine of Hohenlohe-Bartenstein, without issue.
- Anna Louise Francisca (1 April 1681 – 26 April 1728), married to Charles Damman, Viscount d'Oomberghe.
- Clara Bernardina Francisca (11 May 1682 – 27 December 1724), married to Francisco de Sousa Pacheco.
- Emmanuel Ignatius (6 January 1688 – 1 August 1735), Baron de Renaix (17 December 1699), Prince-Regent of Nassau-Siegen, (1727), Fieldmarshal of the Spanish Army, Knight of the Order of Malta (1697), Knight of the Order of the Golden Fleece (1715), Knight of the Order of St. Hubertus (6 June 1720); married in 1711 to Charlotte de Mailly-Nesle; they became formally separated in 1716 without surviving issue (two sons died in infancy). He was the probable grandfather of Charles Henry of Nassau-Siegen.
- Jeanne Baptista Josefina (16 January 1690 – 19 April 1745), Canoness of the St. Waadru Convent at Mons (7 October 1702).

== Ancestors ==
Ancestors of John Francis Desideratus, Prince of Nassau-Siegen

16. William I, Count of Nassau-Siegen
8. John VI of Nassau-Dillenburg
17. Juliana of Stolberg
4. John VII, Count of Nassau-Siegen
18. George III, Landgrave of Leuchtenberg
9. Elisabeth of Leuchtenberg
19. Barbara of Brandenburg-Ansbach-Kulmbach
2. John VIII, Count of Nassau-Siegen
20. Henry VIII, Count of Waldeck
10. Philip IV, Count of Waldeck
21. Anastasia of Runkel
5. Magdalene of Waldeck-Wildungen
22. Salentin VII of Isenburg-Neumagen
11. Jutta of Isenburg-Neumagen
23. Elisabeth of Hunolstein
1. John Francis Desideratus, Prince of Nassau-Siegen
24. Jaques, Count of Ligne
12. Philippe, Count of Ligne
25. Maria of Wassenaer-Leiden
6. Lamoral, 1st Prince of Ligne
26. Philip de Lalaing
13. Margarethe de Lalaing
27. Anna of Renneberg
3. Ernestine Yolande de Ligne d'Amblise
28. François de Melun
14. Hugues II de Melun
29. Louise de Foix
7. Anne-Marie de Melun
30. Pierre de Barbancon-Werchin
15. Yolanda de Barbancon-Werchin
31. Hélène de Bergi

John Francis Desideratus, Prince of Nassau-Siegen House of Nassau Born: 28 July 1627 Died: 17 December 1699
Preceded by John VIII	Count of Nassau-Siegen; From 1652 Prince; 1638–1699	Succeeded by William Hyacinth as Prince of Nassau-Siegen
