= William Hyacinth, Prince of Nassau-Siegen =

Prince of Nassau-Siegen

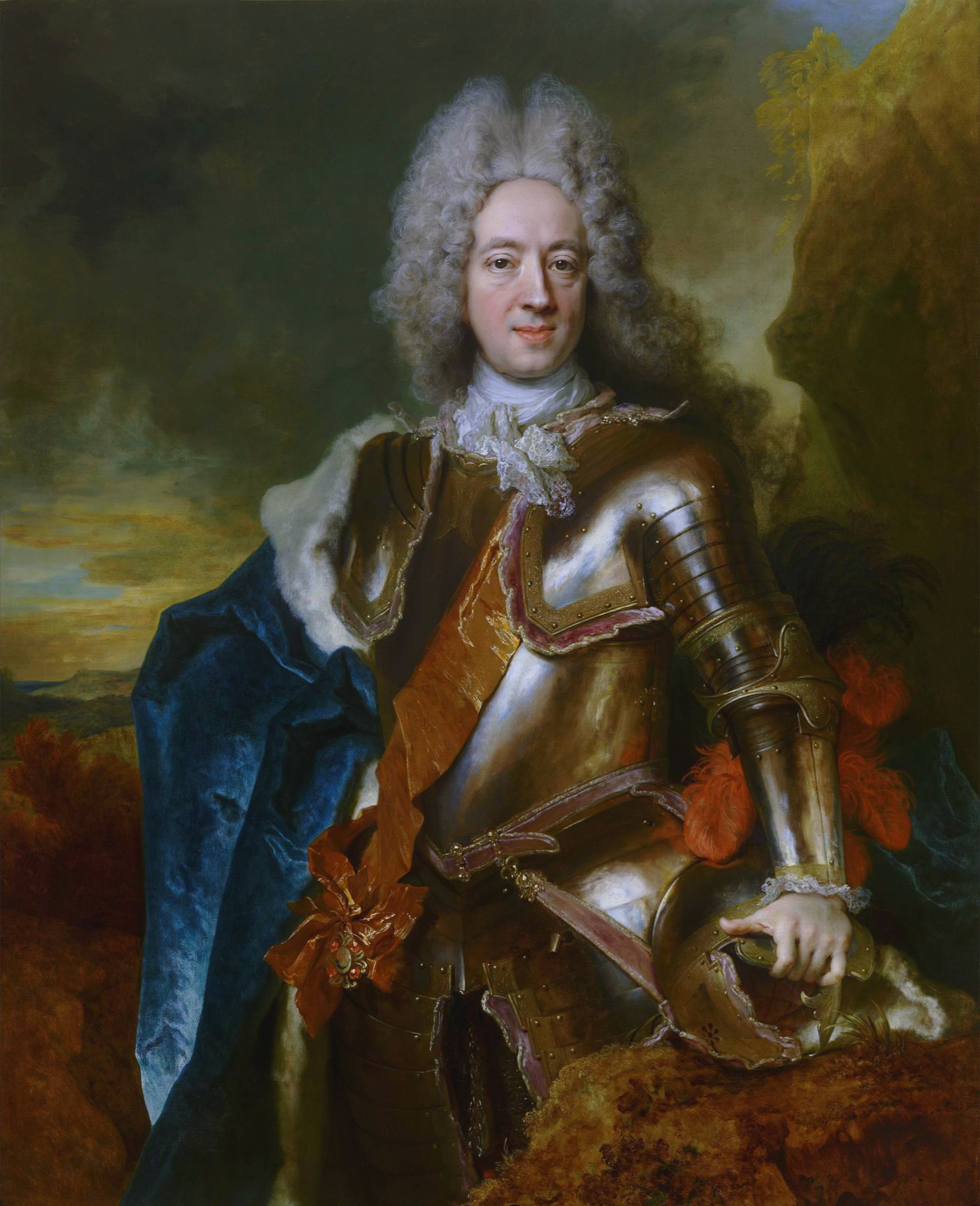
- William Hyacinth, Prince of Nassau-Siegen
- Born: 3 April 1667; Brussels
- Died: 18 February 1743 (aged 76); Hadamar
- Noble family: House of Nassau
- Spouses: Maria Francisca of Fürstenberg-Heiligenberg; Maria Anna of Hohenlohe-Waldenburg-Schillingsfürst; Countess Sophia of Starhemberg
- Father: John Francis Desideratus, Prince of Nassau-Siegen
- Mother: Eleonore Sophie of Baden-Rodemachern

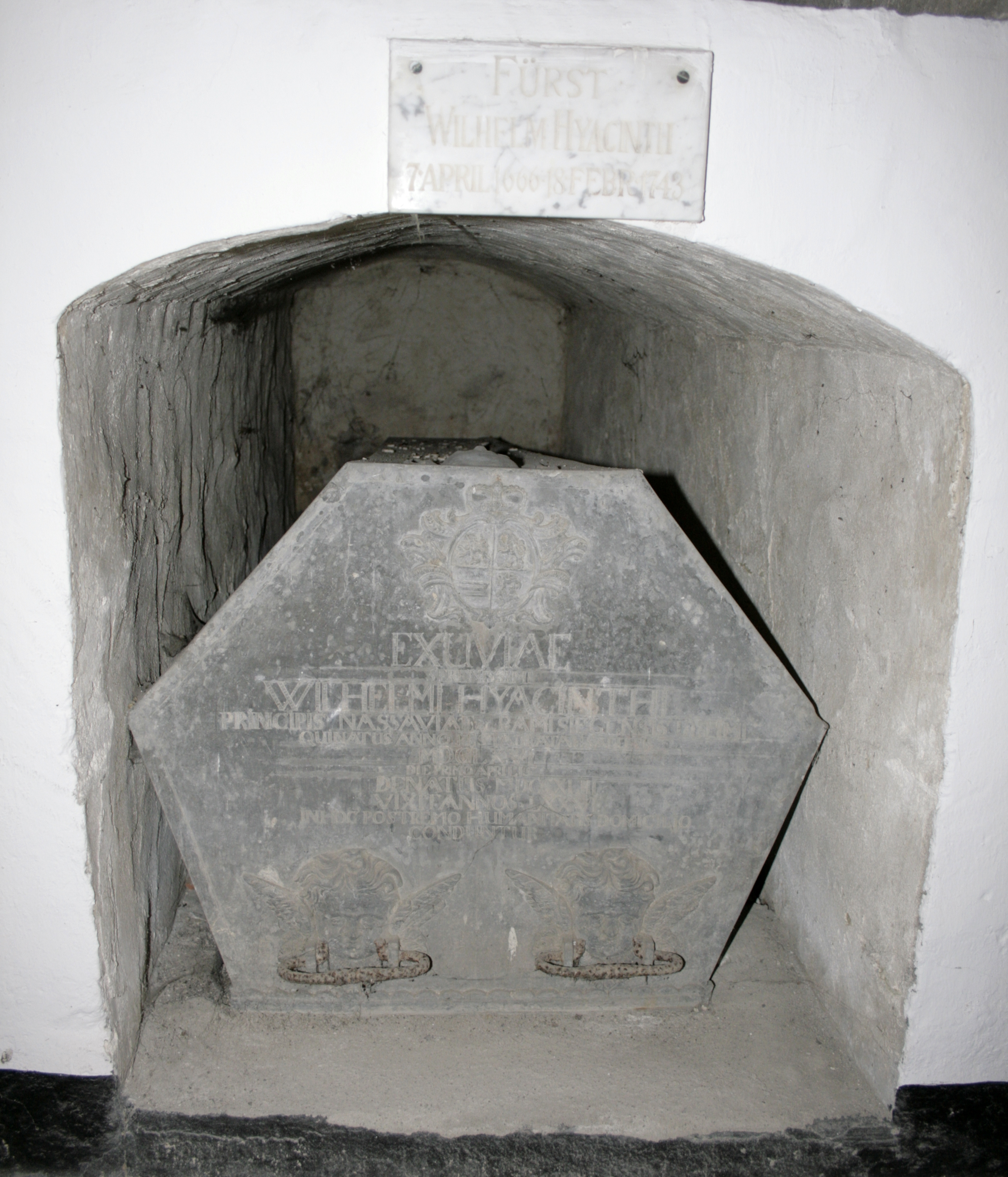
Coffin of William Hyacinth in Hadamar

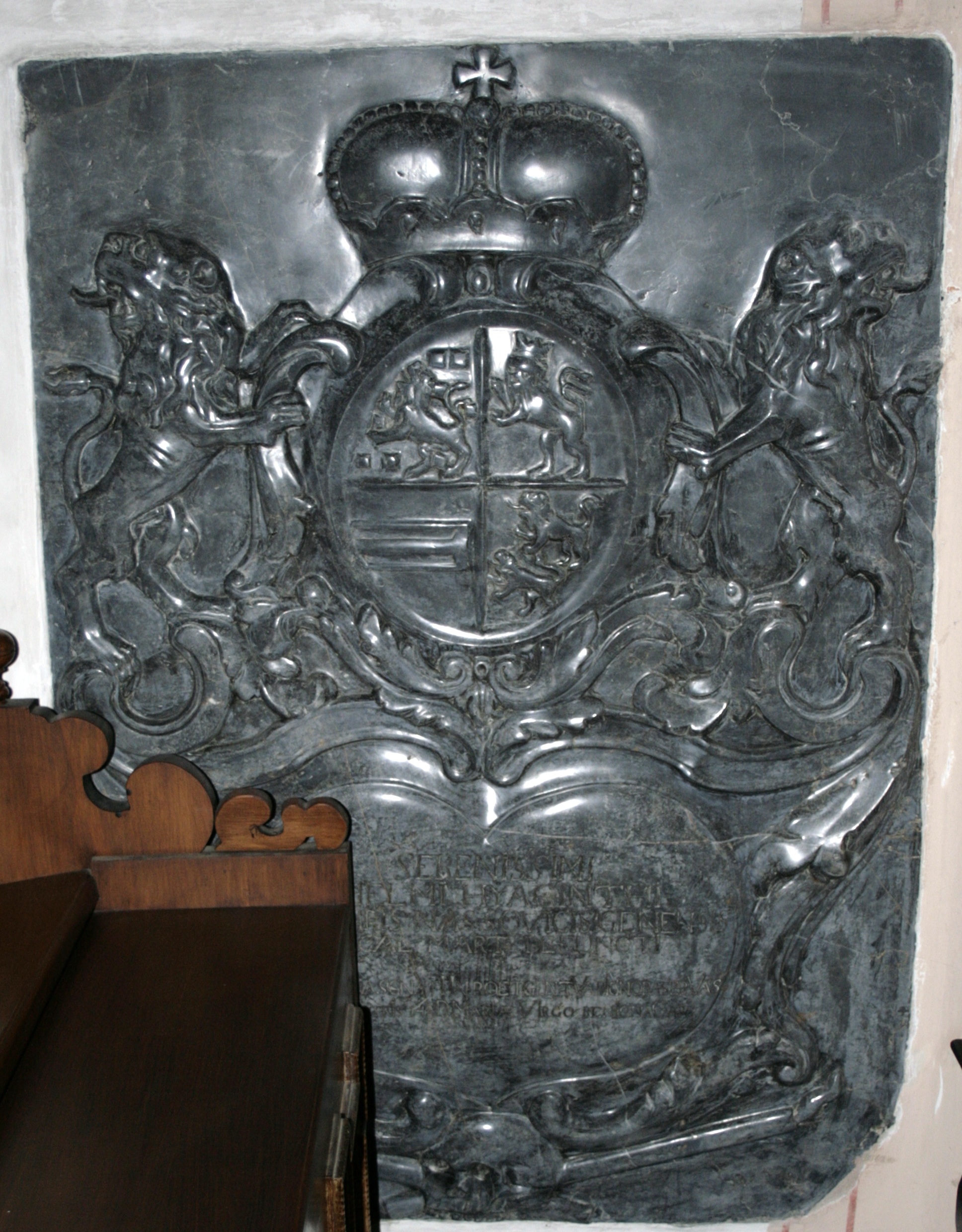
Heart Epitaph of William Hyacinth in the Herzberg Chapel in Hadamar

Prince William Hyacinth of Nassau-Siegen (3 April 1667 in Brussels – 18 February 1743 in Hadamar) was a Prince of Nassau-Siegen.

== Early life ==
Born into the House of Nassau-Siegen, cadet line of the House of Nassau, William Hyacinth was born as the eldest surviving son of Prince John Francis Desideratus of Nassau-Siegen and his second wife, Margravine Eleonore Sophie of Baden-Baden (1640-1668). By birth, he also had claims to the Principality of Orange.

== Biography ==
In 1695, he took up his residence in Siegen. In the same year, the city fell victim to a great fire, which burned 350 buildings, two churches and the Nassau Court, the headquarters of the ruling family. His father began building a new castle in Siegen as the new family home in 1696.

From 17 December 1699 to 2 March 1707, William Hyacinth was the ruler of Nassau-Siegen. He was hoping to inherit much more than his father's principality of Nassau-Siegen, since he was one of the nearest male relatives of the childless King William III of England, and thus a potential heir to William's extensive lands in Germany and the Dutch Republic. However, William III left his possessions by will to John William Friso of Nassau-Dietz. William Hyacinth later used the title of Prince of Orange in Brabant.

He did not even inherit all of his father's wealth. His father had remarried with Isabella Clara du Puget de la Serre and had had seven surviving children with her. In his will, he left her a bequest of 1100 taler per year. Her two sons each received 500 taler per year and her five daughters 200 taler each. William Hyacinth challenged this will before the Imperial Supreme Court, however, he lost his case in 1702.

In the same year William III died in England. William Hyacinth traveled to Paris to secure the support of France with regard to his rights of inheritance. Other claimants were King Frederick I of Prussia and John William Friso of Nassau-Dietz, who was designated as the sole heir in the testament of King William III of England.

King Louis XIV, however, showed little interest in supporting a prince without military power base. William Hyacinth then travelled to the principality of Orange and announced there that he had seized the principality. Louis XIV declared that the Prince Henri Jules of Condé was the rightful heir to the principality of Orange and occupied it militarily. Henri Jules transferred the principality to France. In the Treaty of Utrecht of 1713, the lands of the principality were definitively awarded to France.

His lavish court, with which he wanted to underscore his claim to the inheritance of Orange, his journeys and gifts cost far more than his income from the Duchy of Nassau-Siegen could bear. William Hyacinth was consequently indebted to the bankers De Rhön and Schonemann from Frankfurt, pledging of the villages Wilnsdorf and Wilgersdorf for 20000talers. He increased taxes across the country to intolerable levels. Another source of income were excessive fines, which further damaged his reputation in his country.

His quick temper and ambition were feared in their own family. When his brother (and successor) Frederick William Adolf expressed his displeasure, William Hyacinth directed the guns of his castle on his brother's castle in order to demonstrate his power. Frederick William Adolf then sued his brother in the assembly of the Westphalian Circle. When William Hyacinth visited the court in Vienna in 1705, to raise support for his inheritance claim, Siegen was occupied by troops from Nassau and Prussia. The people revolted and plundered and disarmed William Hyacinth's castle.

The number of complaints about his conduct continued to increase. On 15 July 1706, Siegen was again occupied, this time by troops from County Palatine of Neuburg and Prussia, at the request of the Aulic Council. William Hyacinth's Chancellor, de Colomba, who had played a major rôle in William Hyacinth's tyranny, was arrested and on 20 December 1710 exiled from the German Empire for life. William Hyacinth himself fled to Hadamar, to his cousin Prince Francis Alexander, the last ruler of Nassau-Hadamar.

The revolts against his reign of terror continued. On 29 March 1707 William Hyacinth had Friedrich Flender von der Hardt, a suspected leader of the insurgents, beheaded without any form of trial. Emperor Joseph I used this occasion to deprive William Hyacinth of his principality. It was temporarily administered by two imperial councillors and then passed to Frederick William Adolf. In 1713, France withdrew William Hyacinth's French title of Count of Chalon.

William Hyacinth was awarded an annual pension of 4000 talers. The remaining assets were used to pay the pensions of his stepmother and her siblings, his creditors and a debt of honor to the family of Friedrich Flender. William Hyacinth complained to the emperor and to the Diet of Regensburg, however, neither complaint met with success.

== Marriages and issue ==
William Hyacinth was married three times:

His first wife was Princess Maria Franziska of Fürstenberg-Heiligenberg (1660-1691), daughter of Herman Egon, Prince of Fürstenberg-Heiligenberg and his wife Countess Maria Franziska of Fürstenberg-Stühlingen (1638-1680). They were married on 9 April 1687 in Liège. She died on 7 June 1691. With her he had three children:

- Joseph Hyacinth (1688-1688)
- Francis Joseph (1689–1703)
- A daughter (1691–1692)

His second wife was Maria Anna of Hohenlohe-Waldenburg-Schillingsfürst (1678-1739), daughter of Count Ludwig Gustav of Hohenlohe-Waldenburg-Schillingsfürst (1634-1697) and his wife, Baroness Anna Barbara of Schönborn (1648-1721). They were married on 22 May 1698 in Frankfurt. With her he had one daughter:

- Anna Maria Josepha (1704–1723)

His third wife was Countess Sophia Theresia Hedwigis Eva of Starhemberg (1722-1773), daughter of Imperial envoy, Count Konrad Sigismund of Starhemberg (1689–1727) and his wife, Princess Leopoldine of Löwenstein-Wertheim-Rochefort (1689-1763). She was elder sister of Georg Adam, Prince of Starhemberg. William and Sophia were married on 28 July 1740 in Vienna. This marriage was childless. After Williams death, Sophia married her first cousin, Constantine, Landgrave of Hesse-Rotenburg and had further issue.

== Ancestors ==
Ancestors of William Hyacinth, Prince of Nassau-Siegen

16. John VI of Nassau-Dillenburg
8. John VII, Count of Nassau-Siegen
17. Elisabeth of Leuchtenberg
4. John VIII, Count of Nassau-Siegen
18. Philip IV, Count of Waldeck
9. Magdalene of Waldeck-Wildungen
19. Jutta of Isenburg-Neumagen
2. John Francis Desideratus of Nassau-Siegen
20. Philippe, Count of Ligne
10. Lamoral, 1st Prince of Ligne
21. Margarethe de Lalaing
5. Ernestine Yolande de Ligne d'Amblise
22. Hugues II de Melun
11. Anne-Marie de Melun
23. Yolanda de Barbancon-Werchin
1. William Hyacinth, Prince of Nassau-Siegen
24. Christopher II, Margrave of Baden-Rodemachern
12. Edward Fortunatus
25. Princess Cecilia of Sweden
6. Herman Fortunatus, Margrave of Baden-Rodemachern
26. Joost van Eicken
13. Maria van Eicken
27. Barbara van Moll
3. Maria Eleonora Sophia of Baden-Rodemachern
28. Sebastian of Daun-Falkenstein
14. Philip Francis of Daun-Falkenstein
29. Elisabeth of Salm-Dhaun
7. Maria Sidonia of Daun-Falkenstein
30. Werner, Altgrave of Salm-Reifferscheidt-Dyck
15. Elisabeth of Salm-Reifferscheidt
31. Anna Maria of Limburg-Styrum

== Footnotes ==
William Hyacinth, Prince of Nassau-Siegen House of Nassau Born: 7 April 1666 Died: 18 February 1743
Preceded by John Francis Desideratus	Prince of Nassau-Siegen; 1699–1707	Succeeded by Frederick William Adolf
