= Nassau-Siegen =

State of the Holy Roman Empire (1303–1328; 1606–1743)

Principality of Nassau-Siegen Fürstentum Nassau-Siegen
- 1303–1328 and 1606–1743
- Status: State of the Holy Roman Empire
- Capital: Siegen
- Government: Principality
- Prince-Count
  - 1303–1328: Henry
  - 1606–1623: John VII
  - 1699–1743: William Hyacinth
- History
  - Split off from N-Dillenburg: 1303
  - reunited with N-Dillenburg: 1328
  - Split off from N-Dillenburg again: 1606
  - Divided into Catholic and Protestant parts: 1626
  - C and P parts reunited: 1734
  - Fell to Orange-Nassau-Dietz: 1743

Princely Coat of Arms of Nassau-Siegen

Nassau-Siegen was a principality within the Holy Roman Empire that existed between 1303 and 1328, and again from 1606 to 1743. From 1626 to 1734, it was subdivided into Catholic and Protestant parts. Its capital was the city of Siegen, founded in 1224 and initially a condominium jointly owned by the archbishopric of Cologne and Nassau. It was located some 50 km east of Cologne, and it contained the modern localities of Freudenberg, Hilchenbach, Kreuztal, Siegen, and Wilnsdorf.

== First Nassau-Siegen (1303–1328) ==
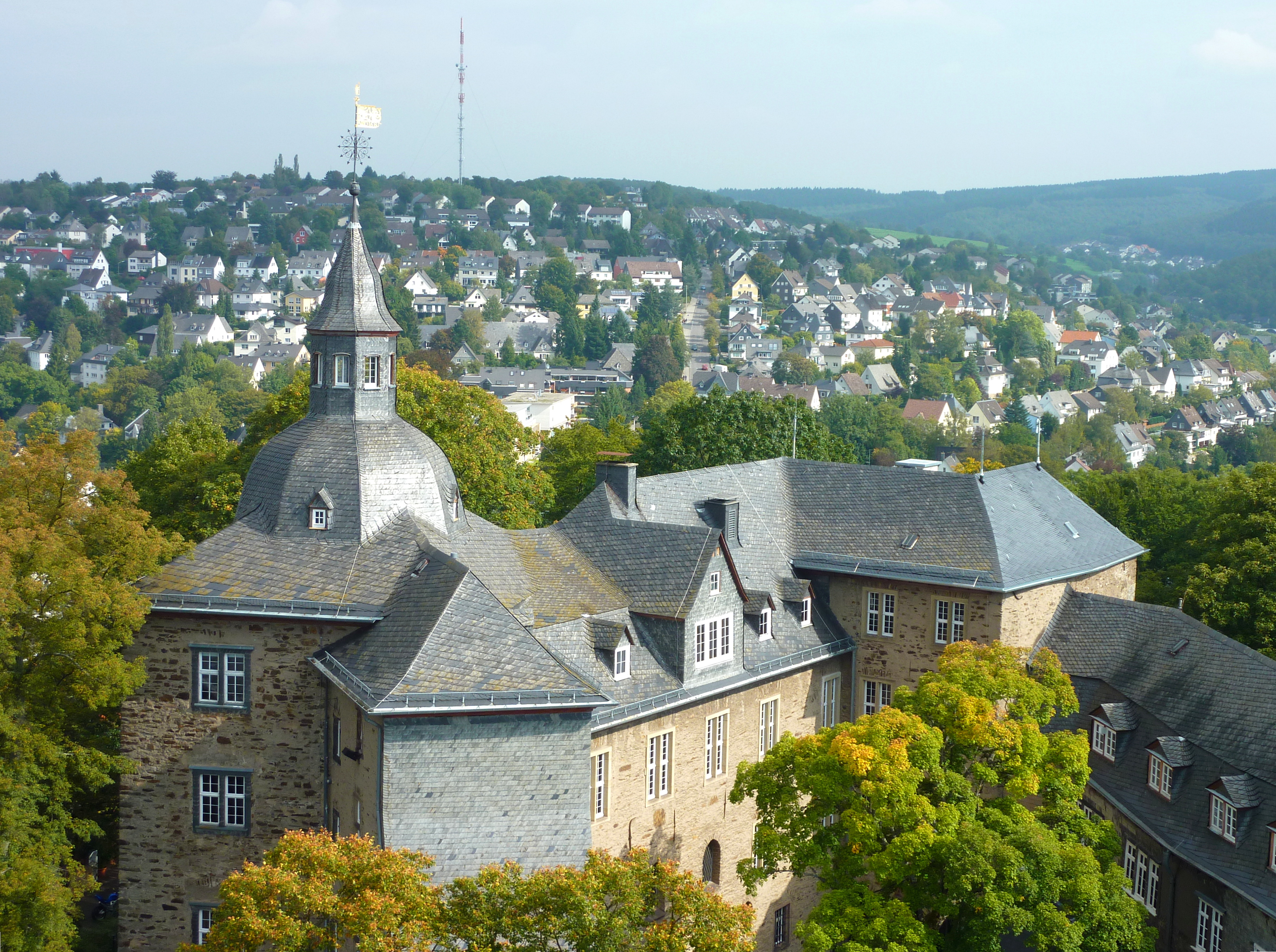
Siegen, Upper Castle

Nassau-Siegen was first created when the sons of Otto I divided their inheritance:

- Henry received Nassau-Siegen
- Emicho received Nassau-Hadamar
- John received Nassau-Dillenburg

John died childless in 1328 and Henry inherited Nassau-Dillenburg. Henry moved to Dillenburg and his descendants are known as the Nassau-Dillenburg line.

== Second Nassau-Siegen (1606–1743) ==
After John VI of Nassau-Dillenburg died in 1606, Nassau-Dillenburg was divided among his five surviving sons:

- William Louis received a rather reduced Nassau-Dillenburg
- George received Nassau-Beilstein
- John VII received Nassau-Siegen
- Ernest Casimir received Nassau-Dietz
- John Louis received Nassau-Hadamar

This division created a new principality of Nassau-Siegen. It belonged to the Lower Rhenish–Westphalian Circle.

After John VII died in 1623, the country was divided:

- His eldest son, John VIII, who had converted to Catholicism, received the part of the county south of the river Sieg and the original castle in Siegen (which after 1695 was called the "Upper Castle"). John VIII was the founder of the Catholic line of Nassau-Siegen.

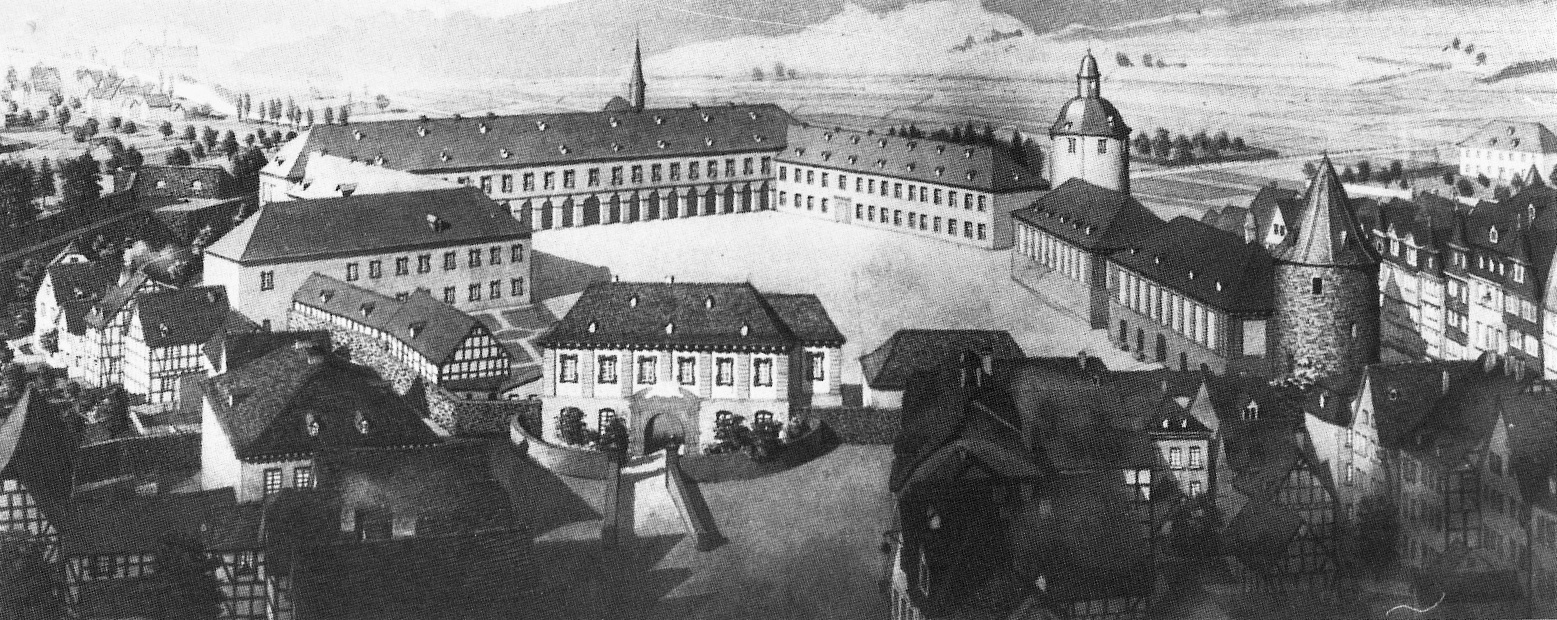
The Lower Castle at Siegen in the 18th century

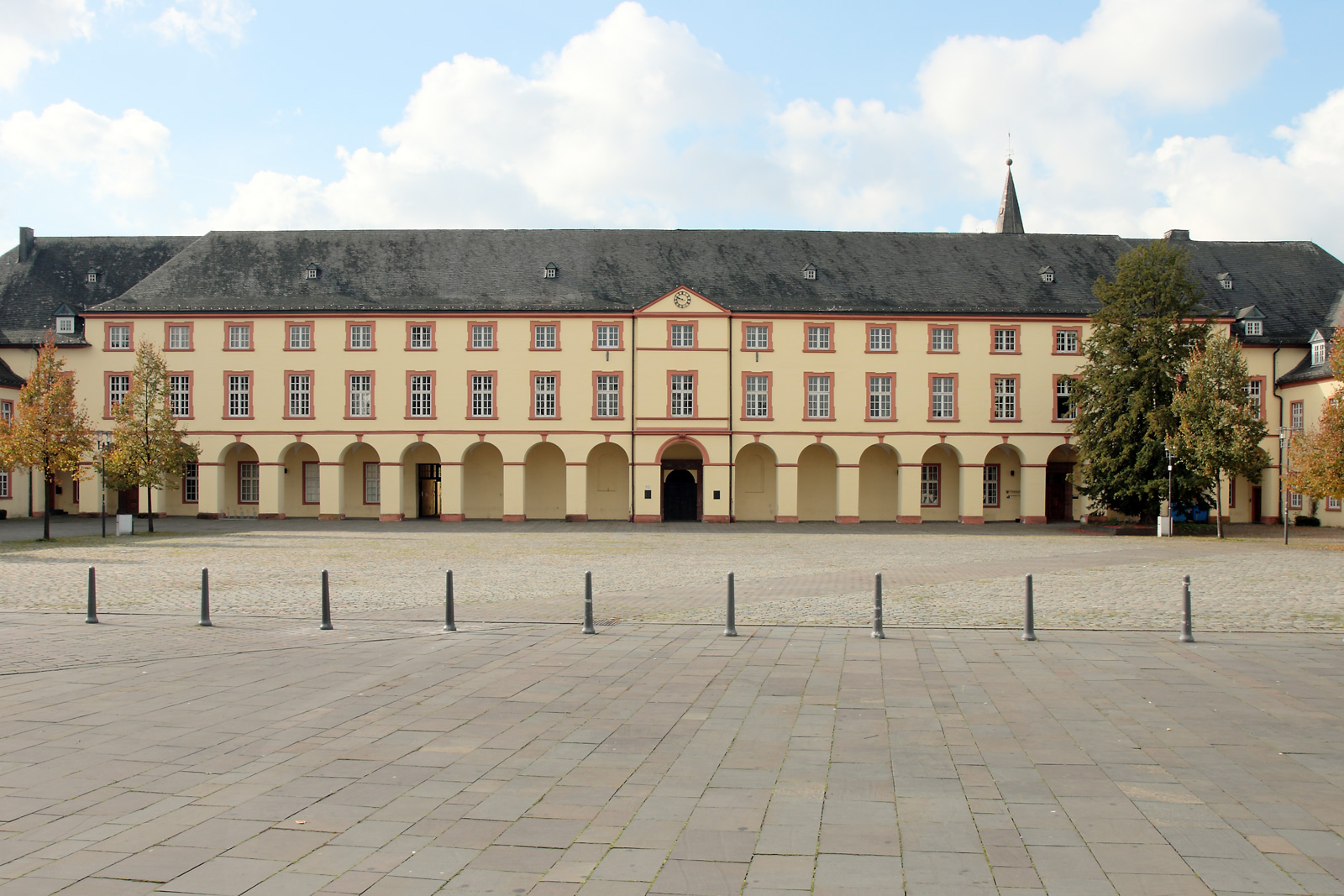
The Lower Castle at Siegen in the 21st century

- John Maurice, who remained Protestant, received the part of the county north of the Sieg. He was the founder of the Protestant line of Nassau-Siegen and he converted the former Franciscan monastery into a new residence, called the "Lower Castle", which was reconstructed after having burnt down at large parts in 1695. John Maurice spent most of his time away from Siegen, since he was governor of Dutch Brazil and later of the Prussian province of Cleves, Mark, and Ravensberg.

In 1652, John Francis Desideratus of the Catholic line was elevated to Imperial Prince. Count Henry of the Protestant line married Marie Elisabeth of Limburg-Styrum, who brought the Lordship of Wisch in the County of Zutphen into the marriage. In 1652, John Maurice of the Protestant line was also elevated to Imperial Prince.

In 1734, the Protestant line died out with the death of Frederick William II. Nassau-Siegen was reunited under William Hyacinth, the last ruler of the Catholic line. When he died in 1743, Nassau-Siegen had died out in the male line, and the territory fell to Prince William IV of the Orange-Nassau-Dietz line, who thereby reunited all the lands of the Ottonian line of the House of Nassau.

== After 1743 ==
The Rheinbundakte, the treaty of July 12, 1806, that created the Confederation of the Rhine, mediatised Nassau-Siegen and placed it under the sovereignty of the newly created Grand Duchy of Berg. In 1808, Prince William VI of Orange-Nassau lost his remaining German possessions, as a punishment for his opposition to Napoleon. In 1813, after the Battle of Leipzig, he regained his territories. In a treaty signed on May 31, 1815, he ceded his German possessions to Prussia, in return for Prussia supporting the creation of the United Kingdom of the Netherlands, where he ruled as King William I.

== Extent of Nassau-Siegen ==
The principality consisted of the districts of Siegen, Netphen, Hilchenbach, and Freudenberg. From 1628–1734, the Protestant part consisted of the districts of Hilchenbach and Freudenberg and a half the district of Siegen. At the time, the Catholic half of the district of Siegen was called the district of Hayn. The Catholic part of the county consisted of the district of Netphen and the other half of the district of Siegen.

In the north, it bordered the Duchy of Westphalia. In the west, it bordered Wildenburg and Sayn-Altenkirchen. In the south, it bordered Nassau-Dillenburg and in the east Wittgenstein-Wittgenstein.

== History ==
The name Siegen comes from the possibly Celtic river name Sieg. It is, however, unclear whether there is any relation between this name and the Celtic-Germanic Sicambri (Ger. Sugambrer) people, who in pre-Christian times lived in parts of North Rhine-Westphalia. The first documentary mention of the place called Sigena dates from 1079. The city's history is markedly shaped by mining, which locally began as far back as La Tène times. Bearing witness to this longtime industry are the many mines that can be found within city limits.

In 1224, Siegen is mentioned as a newly built town whose ownership was shared by the Count of Nassau, Heinrich the Rich, and Engelbert II of Berg, Archbishop of Cologne after the latter transferred one half of the ownership to the former. Moreover, there is proof that the Oberes Schloss ("upper stately home") was already standing at this time. On 19 October 1303, the town was granted Soester Stadtrecht, or Soest town rights. The town remained under the two overlords' joint ownership until 1 February 1381, only then passing fully into Nassau hands.

In the 16th century, the town of Siegen bore a formidable defensive look. It was surrounded by mighty walls with 16 towers and three town gates, and was home to a great castle. The town was stricken several times by townwide fires. Documents record such fires in 1592, and from 10 to 20 April 1695.

In 1536, Heinrich the Rich built a "paedagogium" in the buildings that had once housed a Franciscan Monastery. It later grew into today's Gymnasium at Siegen's Löhrtor (gate). John VII of Nassau-Siegen ("John the Middle") built the Unteres Schloss ("lower stately home") on the site of an old Franciscan Monastery. In 1616, John VII founded a knightly war school in the still standing old armoury on Burgstraße, "expressly to produce an officer corps for Calvinism".

His son John VIII ("The Younger") returned in 1612 to the Roman Catholic Church, and wanted to use force to make the townsfolk also convert back to Roman Catholicism. In 1632, Nassau-Siegen was conquered by the Swedes, after which his half-brother John Maurice of Nassau-Siegen, the Dutch commander in Brazil, re-introduced Protestantism. John VIII died in 1638 and was succeeded by his only son Johan Frans Desideratus, who had to cede part of Nassau-Siegen (north of the Sieg river) to the Protestant branch of the family.

John Maurice's leadership served in 1650–1651 to bring about a split in the Siegerland along denominational lines. Under Wilhelm Hyacinth of Nassau-Siegen, violence broke out between the two denominational groups. When on 29 March 1707 townsman Friedrich Flender was killed, Wilhelm Hyacinth was himself unseated and furthermore driven out of the town. Wilhelm Hyacinth was the last in the line of Nassau-Siegen's Catholic rulers, dying in 1743. Already in 1734, though, the Reformed line had died out, too, with Friedrich Wilhelm's death, leading Charles VI, Holy Roman Emperor to transfer power in the territory to the Prince of Orange and the Prince of Nassau-Diez. Under their leadership, mining, the main source of wealth, blossomed, along with agriculture and silviculture. When Prince William of Orange refused to join the Confederation of the Rhine, founded by Napoleon, he found himself unseated by the French leader and the Siegerland passed to the Grand Duchy of Berg. After Napoleon's downfall in 1813, however, William I regained his former German inheritances, but in 1815 he ceded them to the Kingdom of Prussia for the Grand Duchy of Luxembourg. Siegen was assigned to the Siegen district, first in the Koblenz region, and as of 1817 in the Arnsberg region within the Prussian Province of Westphalia.

Under Prussian rule, Siegen developed into the South Westphalian centre that it is today. On 1 March 1923, Siegen was set apart from the district bearing its name, and became a district-free town, while still keeping its function as seat of the district of which it was no longer part, and which was itself merged with Wittgenstein district under district reform in 1975. Siegen also lost its district-free status at this time, becoming part of the new Siegen-Wittgenstein district, the name that the district has borne since 1984.

During World War II, Siegen was repeatedly bombed by the Allies owing to a crucial railroad that crossed through the town. On 1 April 1945, the US 8th Infantry Division began the Allied ground assault against Siegen and the dominating military-significant high ground north of the river. The battle against determined German forces at Siegen continued through 2 April 1945, until organized resistance was finally overwhelmed by the division on 3 April 1945.

== Rulers of Nassau-Siegen ==
=== Undivided ===
| reign | ruler | born | died |
|---|---|---|---|
| 1303-1328 | Henry | before 1288 | 1347 |
| | Nassau-Siegen reunited with Nassau-Dillenburg | | |
| 1606-1623 | John VII | 7 July 1561 | 7 September 1623 |

=== Catholic line ===
| reign | ruler | born | died | relation to predecessor |
|---|---|---|---|---|
| 1623-1638 | John VIII | 29 September 1583 | 27 July 1638 | son of John VII |
| 1638-1699 | John Francis Desideratus | 28 July 1627 | 17 December 1699 | son |
| 1699-1743 | William Hyacinth | 3 April 1667 | 18 February 1743 | son |

=== Protestant line ===
| reign | ruler | born | died | relation to predecessor |
|---|---|---|---|---|
| 1624-1642 | William | 13 August 1592 | 17 July 1642 | son of John VII |
| 1642-1679 | John Maurice | 18 June 1604 | 20 December 1679 | halfbrother |
| 1679-1691 | William Maurice | 18 January 1649 | 23 January 1691 | nephew |
| 1691-1722 | Frederick William Adolf | 20 February 1680 | 13 February 1722 | son |
| 1722-1734 | Frederick William II | 11 November 1706 | 2 March 1734 | son |
