= Biebricher Allee =

- Interactive map of Biebricher Allee
- Length: 2.7 km (1.7 mi)
- Location: Wiesbaden
- North end: Ringroad near central station
- Major junctions: Autobahn 66
- South end: Biebrich

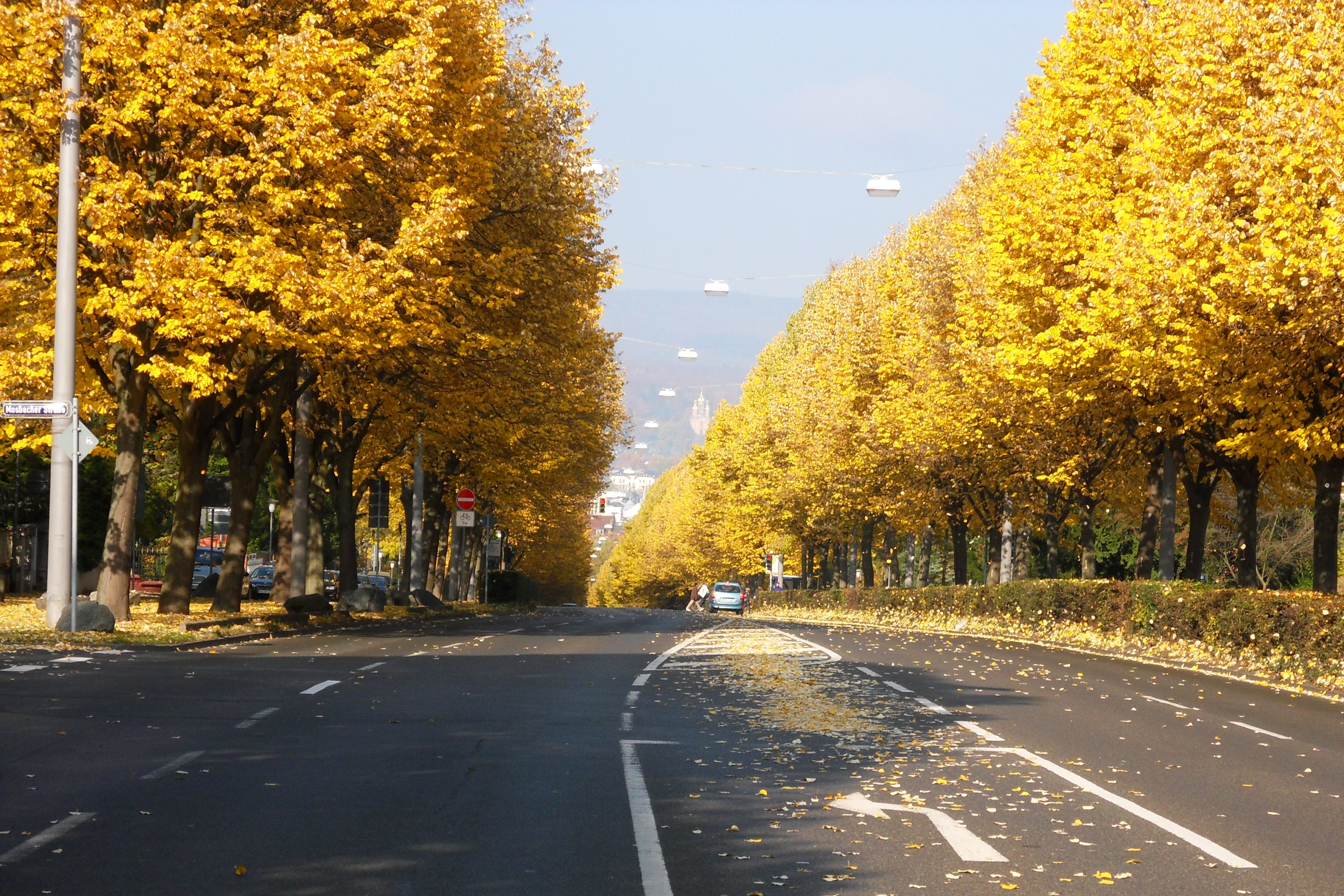
Biebricher Allee towards city

Biebricher Allee is a major arterial road in Wiesbaden, Germany, running from Ringroad near central station at the north end, south through the suburb of Südost and then towards and through Biebrich. The road is west of Kasteler Straße at their intersection. Shortly before the south end there are exits towards Autobahn 66, which crosses Biebricher Allee under a bridge. The street is with the Schiersteiner Straße, Mainzer Straße and Ringstraße the busiest southern arterial road in Wiesbaden and is often congested in the peak-hour traffic. The avenue has a length of approximately 2,700 metres.

The street was named according to the primary direction to Biebrich, before 1926 a former independent city situated on the river Rhine.
