= Salzbach valley bridge =

Coordinates: 50.052°N 8.255°E

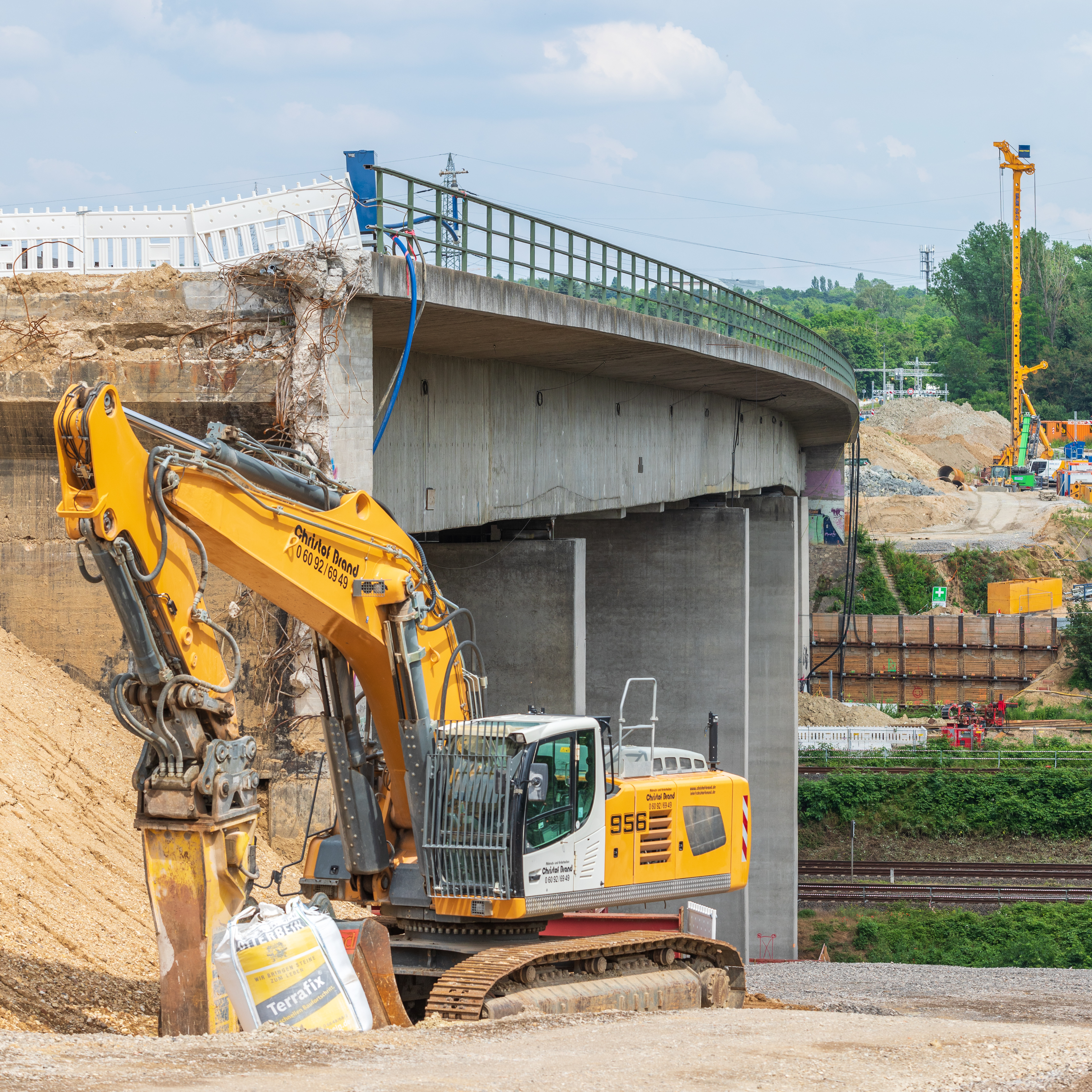
Salzbachtal bridges after closure and prior to demolition

The Salzbach valley bridge (German: Salzbachtalbrücke) was a pair of parallel bridges located south of Wiesbaden, the capital of the state of Hessen, in Germany. The bridges were built from prestressed concrete to carry the main Bundesautobahn 66 road route over the Salzbach stream, the Mainzer Straße and Bundesautobahn 671, plus the main rail tracks approaching Wiesbaden Hauptbahnhof station.

Explosive demolition at 12:00 on 6 November 2021

Both bridges were declared unsafe during mid-2021, disrupting regional road traffic, and diverting all rail services to stop at Wiesbaden Ost station outside of the city centre. A controlled demolition of both bridges took place on 6 November 2021 at 12 noon.

Following the demolition, the initial focus was planned to clear the rubble across the five removed railway tracks and to enable re-opening of rail access to the city, and road access to the Bundesautobahn 671 southwards. The Bundesautobahn 66, previously carried over the bridges, would remain interrupted. The first replacement bridge was projected to be opened in 2023, with foundations and some structural parts already having been manufactured.
