= Hessian Central State Archives =

- Interactive map of Hessian Central State Archives
- 50.0635°N 8.2391°E
- Location: Mosbacher Str. 55, 65187, Wiesbaden, Germany
- Affiliation: State Archives of Hesse[*]
- Director: Nicola Wurthmann
- Employees: ca. 70
- Website: Hessian State Archives

The Hessian Central State Archives, Wiesbaden (Hessisches Hauptstaatsarchiv Wiesbaden in German) is a department of the Hessian State Archives and is located in Wiesbaden, the capital of the German state of Hesse. It serves alongside the Hessian State Archives, Darmstadt and the Hessian State Archives, Marburg as the main regional archives for Hesse and additionally functions as the central archives for the state government and ministries, as well as other institutions with nationwide jurisdiction.

== Name ==
The archives have been renamed several times:

- until 1945: Prussian State Archives, Wiesbaden
- until 1958: State Archives, Wiesbaden
- until 1963: Central State Archives, Wiesbaden
- since 1963: Hessian Central State Archives

== History ==
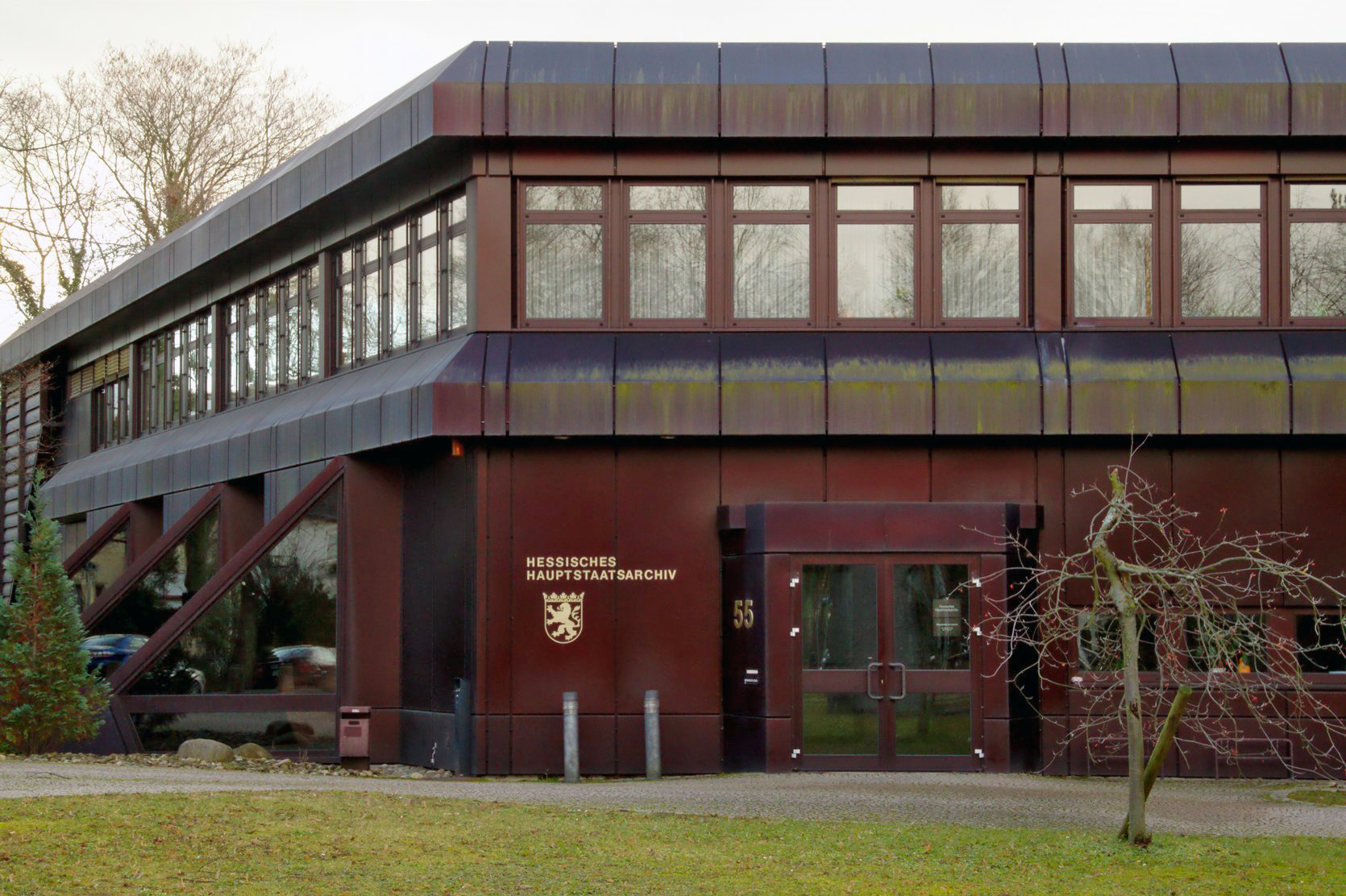
The Hessian State Archives in Wiesbaden

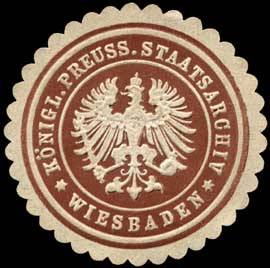
Seal of the Royal Prussian State Archives – Wiesbaden

The Hessian Central State Archives originated as the archives of the counties and principalities held by the House of Nassau. With the entry of the princes of the Nassau-Usingen and Nassau-Weilburg cadet branches to the Confederation of the Rhine in 1806, the Duchy of Nassau was formed, with Wiesbaden serving as its capital. This reordering of the governing structure resulted in a fundamental reorganization of the existing archives as well. The old government archives of Nassau-Usingen, located in Idstein Castle, were given the additional function of the central archives of the duchy, which collected the historical archive holdings of the former principalities of Nassau-Idstein and Nassau-Usingen. It oversaw archives in Weilburg, Dillenburg, and Hachenburg. The archives of over twenty spiritual and secular territories formally belonging to the principalities of Nassau, which had been dissolved by the Imperial Recess of 1803, were transferred to the new central archives.

The annexation of the Duchy of Nassau by Prussia after the Austro-Prussian War in 1866 led to another administrative reorganization. The duchy was included in the Prussian administrative region of Wiesbaden along with the former Free City of Frankfurt. In 1881, in order to accommodate the resulting surge of archival materials, the Prussian Archive Administration commissioned a new building to house the archives on Mainzer Straße in Wiesbaden. This archive building, which was extended in 1908/1909 by the addition of a repository building, survived World War II largely unscathed, and after the founding of the State of Hesse in 1945, became one of the three Hessian state archives. It remained responsible for the administrative region of Wiesbaden, and even after the dissolution of the administrative region in 1968, the Central State Archives has continued to supervise the archives of the subordinate governmental departments of its former territory. In addition, after the founding of the State of Hesse, the State Archives, Wiesbaden was given the function of the archives for the central offices and institutions of the state, which is where the designation Central State Archives derives.

== Directors ==
- 1840–1853 Friedrich Traugott Friedemann
- 1866–1872 Karl Rossel
- 1878–1896 Wilhelm Sauer
- 1897–1921 Paul Wagner
- 1921–1931 de:Max Eugen Domarus
- 1933–1938 Rudolf Vaupel
- 1947–1961 Georg Wilhelm Sante
- 1961–1970 Otto Renkhoff
- 1971–1976 Wolf-Heino Struck
- 1976–1995 Wolf-Arno Kropat
- 1996–1999 Winfried Schüler
- 1999–2014 Klaus Eiler
- 2014–2019 Volker Eichler
- 2019–present: Nicola Wurthmann

== Collections ==
The collections are divided into six groups:

- Holy Roman Empire
- Duchy of Nassau
- Prussia
- State of Hesse
- Collections Not of State Governmental Origin (municipalities, political parties, associations, other organizations, as well as individuals)
- Special Collections (real estate documents, vital records and demographic documents, manuscripts and cartulary, printed materials, maps, plans, audio and visual materials, cultural history collections, as well as documentation)

=== Historical Collections ===
The historical collections include:

- House Archives and Traditions of the House of Orange-Nassau
- Counties and Principalities of Nassau
- County of Sayn-Wittgenstein-Hachenburg and Other Domains.
- Duchy of Nassau
- Free City of Frankfurt
- Landgraviate of Hesse-Homburg
- Province of Hesse-Nassau
- Administrative Region of Wiesbaden (with Montabaur and Rhein-Lahn-Kreis [since 1945])
- Archives of monasteries acquired through secularization:
  - Arnstein Abbey
  - Eberbach Abbey
  - Marienstatt Abbey
  - Limburg Cathedral
- Partial archives acquired by the former Duchy of Nassau
  - Diocese of Mainz
  - Diocese of Trier
- Family archives, for example:
  - The Dungers,
  - Marschall von Bieberstein
- Archives of the Reichskammergericht

=== New additions ===
The Hessian Central State Archives has dual responsibilities:

- It is tasked with the acquisition of historically significant documents from Hessian ministries as well as all government offices, courts, and state facilities for the entire state of Hesse. In this function, it also maintains interim archives for written materials that are still subject to a regulatory retention period.
- As regional archives it is, like the other two Hessian State Archives in Marburg and Darmstadt, responsible for the archival materials of the subordinate state departments in the independent cities of Frankfurt and Wiesbaden, as well as the districts of Hochtaunuskreis, Lahn-Dill-Kreis, Landkreis Limburg-Weilburg, Main-Kinzig-Kreis, Main-Taunus-Kreis, and Rheingau-Taunus-Kreis.

In addition to the archives from the registries of state offices and ecclesiastical institutions, the Hessian Central State Archives also holds documents of non-governmental origin, such as political parties and associations, as well as the nachlässe of scientists, people from contemporary history, and politicians. For example, the archives contain materials from Karl Geiler, Erwin Stein and Heinrich Troeger.

=== Scope ===
Currently the Hessian Central State Archives holds materials with the following scope:

- 65,004 documents from the years 910 until ca. 1850
- ca. 50 shelf-kilometers of official files and records, urbaria, protocol records, invoices and cadastres (from the 15th century)
- ca. 196,000 maps, plans and posters
- ca. 261,000 drawings and photographs
- A library with over 100,000 volumes

== Additional functions ==
The headquarters of the Hessian Central State Archives, Wiesbaden also houses other central functions for the Hessian State Archives:

- Filming of historically valuable archival material related to Hesse on behalf of the federal government
- Leading in the development and operation of modern archival information technologies, such as the Arcinsys archival information system
- Digital Archives Hesse, which collects digital archival materials that are "born digital" (since the end of 2009)
- Central Press and Public Relations (publication of Archivnachrichten aus Hessen and other communications services for the Hessian State Archives, such as maintenance of the official website)

== Building ==
The absorption of archives and registries from dissolved government entities in the post-war era and the acquisition of new written materials from the central state offices quickly overwhelmed the storage capacity of the archives. Between 1981 and 1985, a new building was built on Mosbacher Straße in Wiesbaden, reflecting the latest in archival technology. Even today it is considered an exemplary archival building with a capacity of around 70 linear km of archival materials. The old 19th-century archives building on Mainzer Straße was demolished after the move.
