= Henry II of Nassau-Siegen =

German count (1414–1451)

Henry II, Count of Nassau-Siegen
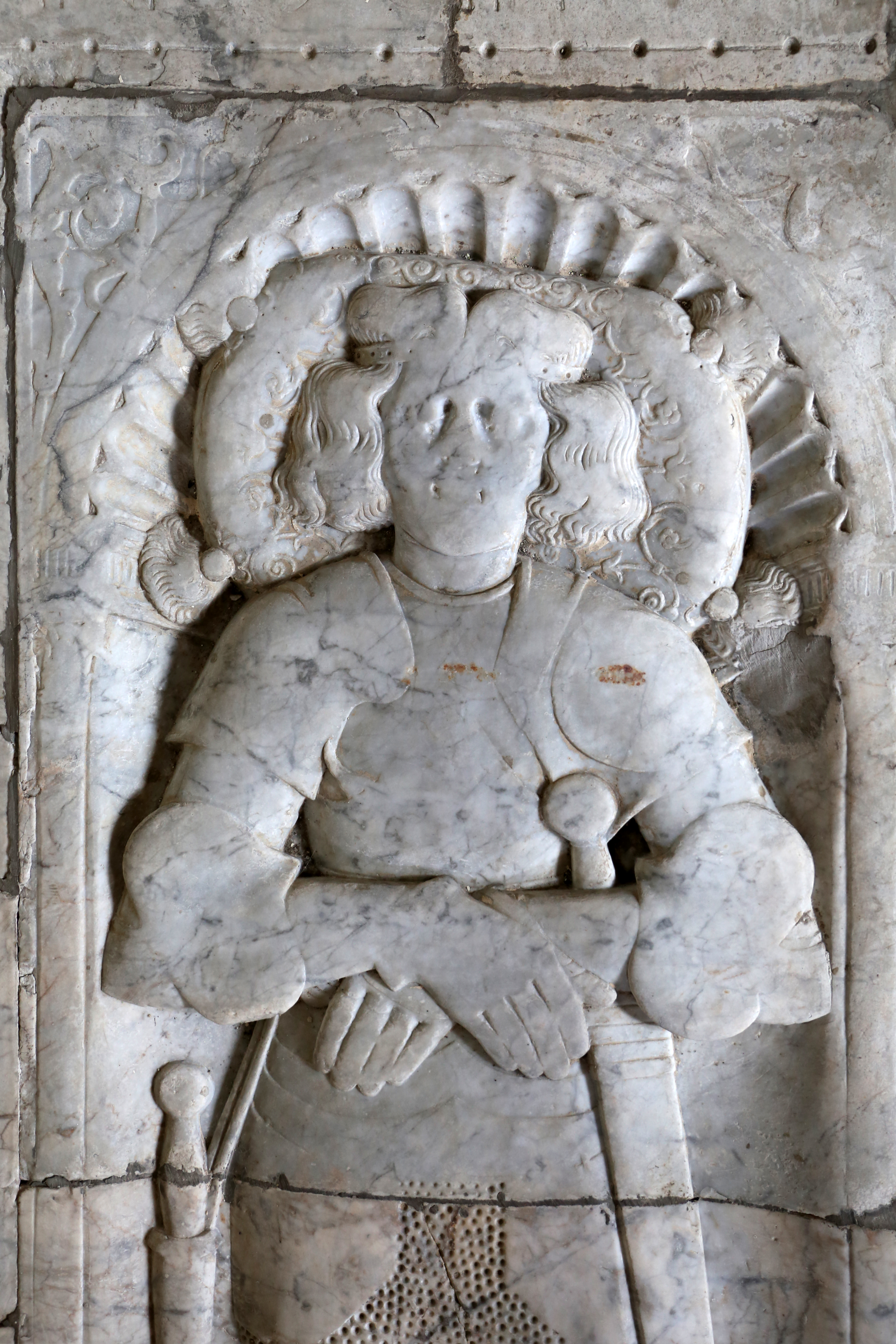
- Detail of the tombstone of Count Henry II of Nassau-Siegen in the Collegiata in San Quirico d'Orcia.

Count of Nassau-Siegen Count of Vianden Count of Diez
- Coat of arms
- Reign: 1442–1451
- Predecessor: Engelbert I
- Successor: John IV
- Full name: Henry II, Count of Nassau-Siegen
- Native name: Heinrich II. Graf von Nassau-Siegen
- Born: Heinrich Graf zu Nassau, Vianden und Diez, Herr zu Breda; 7 January 1414
- Died: 18 January 1451 (aged 37); Radicofani
- Buried: Collegiata, San Quirico d'Orcia
- Noble family: House of Nassau-Siegen
- Spouses: Genoveva of Virneburg; Irmgard of Schleiden-Junkerath
- Issue Detail: Ottilie
- Father: Engelbert I of Nassau-Siegen
- Mother: Joanne of Polanen

Count Henry II of Nassau-Siegen (Note: In many sources he is called Henry II of Nassau-Dillenburg. His official titles were Count of Nassau, Vianden and Diez, Lord of Breda. It is incorrect to refer to him as the only reigning Count of Nassau, because the County of Nassau was divided into Nassau-Beilstein, Nassau-Siegen, Nassau-Weilburg and Nassau-Wiesbaden-Idstein. Furthermore, there was the cadet branch of Nassau-Saarbrücken, which ruled the County of Saarbrücken. Henry ruled the County of Nassau-Siegen, which is erroneously called Nassau-Dillenburg in many sources. See note 2.) (7 January 1414 – 18 January 1451), de:Heinrich II. Graf von Nassau-Siegen, official titles: Graf zu Nassau, Vianden und Diez, Herr zu Breda, was since 1442 Count of Nassau-Siegen (Note: The County of Nassau-Siegen is erroneously called Nassau-Dillenburg in many sources. The county was not named after the small, unimportant city of Dillenburg, which did not even have a church at that time, but after the, for that time, large city of Siegen, the economic centre of the county and the counts' main residence. See Lück (1981), passim. It is also evident from the numbering of the reigning counts with the name John. One John without number who ruled the County of Nassau-Dillenburg in the period 1303–1328, and eight counts by the name of John who ruled the County of Nassau-Siegen in the period 1362–1638.) (a part of the County of Nassau), of Vianden and of half Diez. He descended from the Ottonian Line of the House of Nassau.

== Biography ==
Henry was born on 7 January 1414 (Note: The sources do not mention a place of birth.) as the second son of Count Engelbert I of Nassau-Siegen and Lady Joanne of Polanen. Already on 18 May 1415, a contract was made for his first marriage, allocating Vianden, St. Vith and Bütgenbach to him.

=== Count of Nassau-Siegen, Vianden and Diez ===
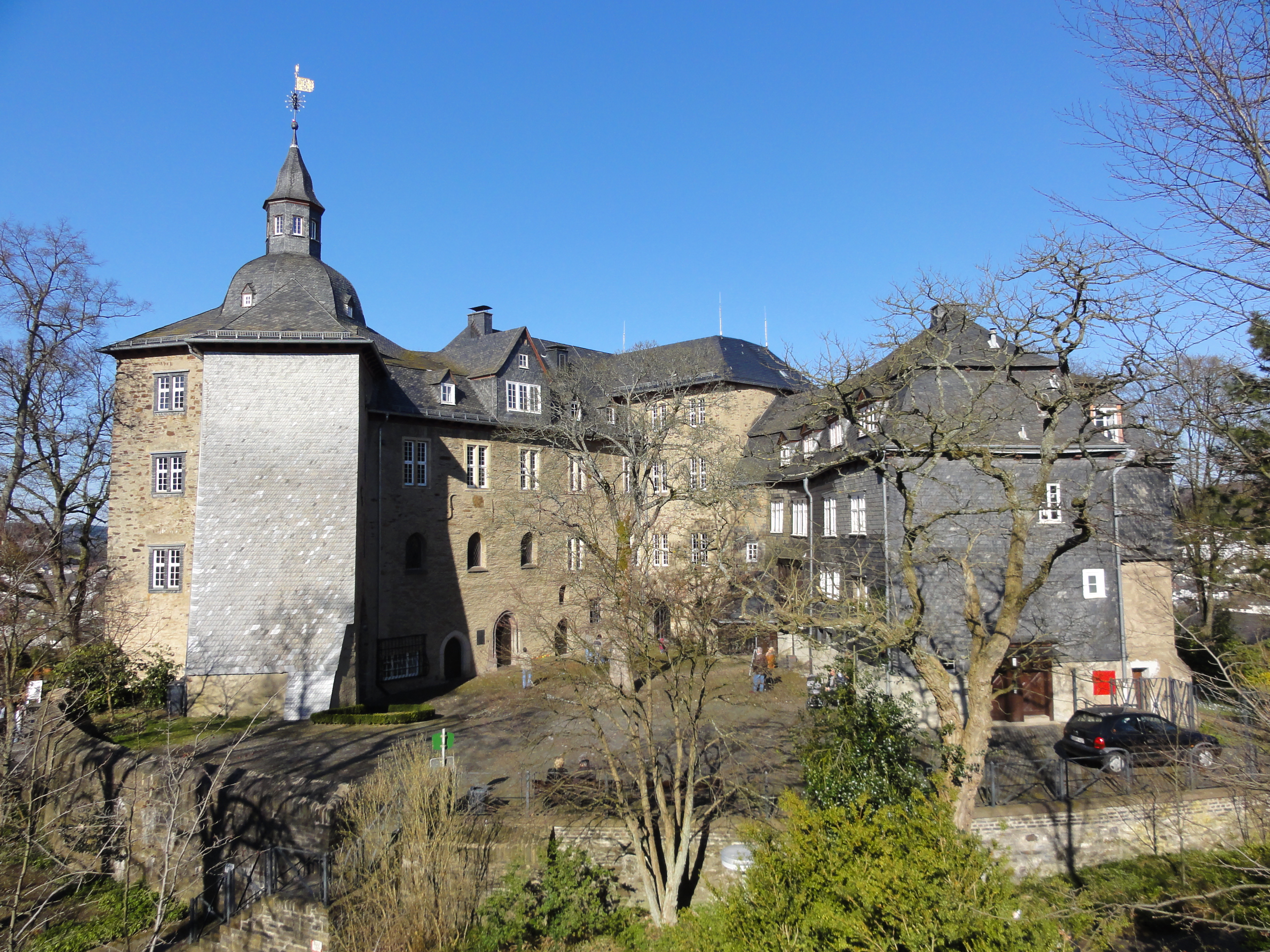
Siegen Castle, 2011.

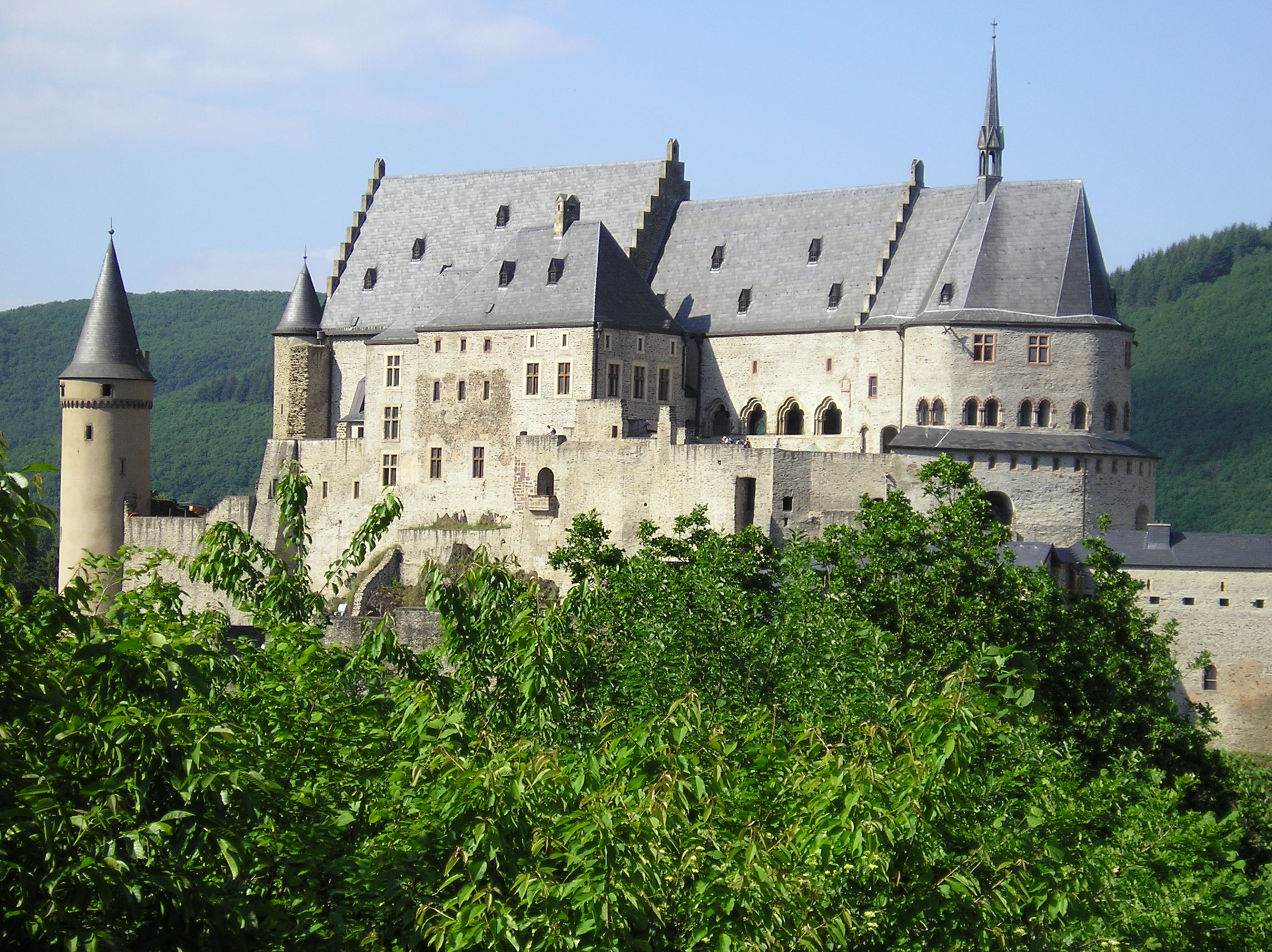
Vianden Castle. Photo: Vincent de Groot, 2004.

Henry succeeded his father as Count of Nassau-Siegen, Vianden and Diez, and Lord of Breda in 1442, together with his brother Count John IV. (Note: Van Ditzhuyzen (2004), p. 152 on the other hand, writes that John inherited all possessions of his father in 1442.) However, the County of Vianden had already been assigned to Henry by the marriage contract on 18 May 1415. In that same year 1442, Roman King Frederick III granted Henry (his share of) the land of Cleves, the County of Mark, the land of Dinslaken (Diesbach) and (half of) the County of Diez as fiefs. Also in that year, Henry, his brother John and their distant cousin Count John I, Count of Nassau-Beilstein were granted Greifenstein Castle as a fief and a part of the proceeds from the toll in Lahnstein. Together with his brother, Henry inherited the property of their uncle Count John II with the Helmet in May 1443. On 20 January 1445, Henry was granted the County of Vianden as a fief by Thierry II of Moers, Archbishop of Cologne On 22 February 1447 Henry and his brother John divided their possessions, whereby Henry obtained the possessions in Germany as well as ¾ of the County of Vianden.

=== Dispute over the County of Diez ===
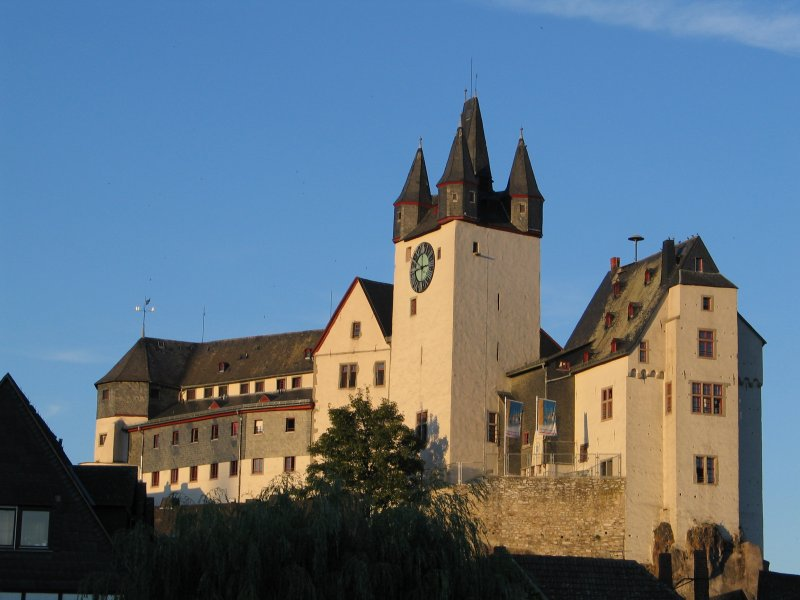
Diez Castle. Photo: Peter Klassen, 2006.

On 2 July 1420, Henry's father and Count Godfrey VII of Eppstein-Münzenberg transferred the County of Diez, which they jointly owned and which was an imperial fief, to Otto of Ziegenhain, Archbishop of Trier of Trier, and received it back from him as a fief. On 27 July 1441, Roman King Frederick III informed James I, Archbishop of Tier, that with the charter of 2 July 1420 he had proved that Engelbert and Godfrey had transferred the imperial fief of the County of Diez to Archbishop Otto and received it as a fief. On 30 July 1441, Frederick ordered Engelbert and Count Godfrey VIII of Eppstein-Münzenberg to accept the County of Diez as a fief from Archbishop James.

On the same day the King informed Henry and Godfrey that he had granted Archbishop James the County of Diez as a fief together with all its appurtenances. Thereafter they and their heirs were to receive the county from Archbishop James as a fief, as they and their ancestors had had it as a fief from the Roman Emperors and Kings until now. The king ordered Henry and Godfrey and their heirs to receive and possess the said county and its appurtenances from Archbishop James and his successors, to behave in accordance with the obligations of their fathers and to send Archbishop James for himself and his heirs charters about it. Then he released them from all feudal obligations with which they were bound to the king and the empire because of the said county, and decreed that in case of violation the county or the part of it which the violator possessed, would revert to James, his successors and the Electorate of Trier.

On 30 June 1442 James invited Henry to St. Maximin's Abbey on 15 July to settle their dispute. Henry requested on 7 July a waer affschryfft (true copy) of his father's charter to Archbishop Otto. On 13 July James sent a letter from Frederick III, in which the latter confirmed the sealed charter of 1420, to Henry. On 30 August 1442, Frederick appointed Count palatine Louis IV as a judge to act as the king's deputy in the dispute between Henry and James, to summon and interrogate the disputing parties and to reach a reconciliation. In the event that a settlement did not succeed, Louis was authorised to come to a judgment. The king stipulated that Louis' decision would be valid in the same way as his own. In a letter from Louis to James dated 16 August 1443, not only Henry but also his brother John IV and their uncle John II are mentioned as opponents of the archbishop. Henry and John IV complained to James on 20 October 1443 about pledges by him in onser erebschafft (in our inheritance). In his answer of 2 November 1443 James referred both counts to the court day planned by Louis.

A solution was apparently not reached there, because on 6 October 1444, following a complaint by James against Henry and John about the counties of Nassau and Diez and other fiefs, Frederick appointed Archbishop Dietrich of Mainz, as judge and gave him power of attorney to schedule a trial between the two parties on his behalf, and then to render a judgment. The king again stipulated that Dietrich's decision would be valid in the same way as a decision of his own, and exhorted the archbishop to let justice take its course even in the event one of the parties did not appear at the hearing. Dietrich's verdict is unknown.

On 24 July 1451 Frederick granted James, because Henry and Godfrey had not received the County of Diez from James, although more than a year and a day had elapsed since the royal letter was proclaimed to them, and also because Godfrey had pledged his share of the county without the King's and archbishop's consent, all the rights that had reverted to the King and the kingdom on account of the failure to take it as a fief and the pledging. Finally, on 4 November, James granted Henry's brother and heir John the county as a fief.

=== Death and burial ===
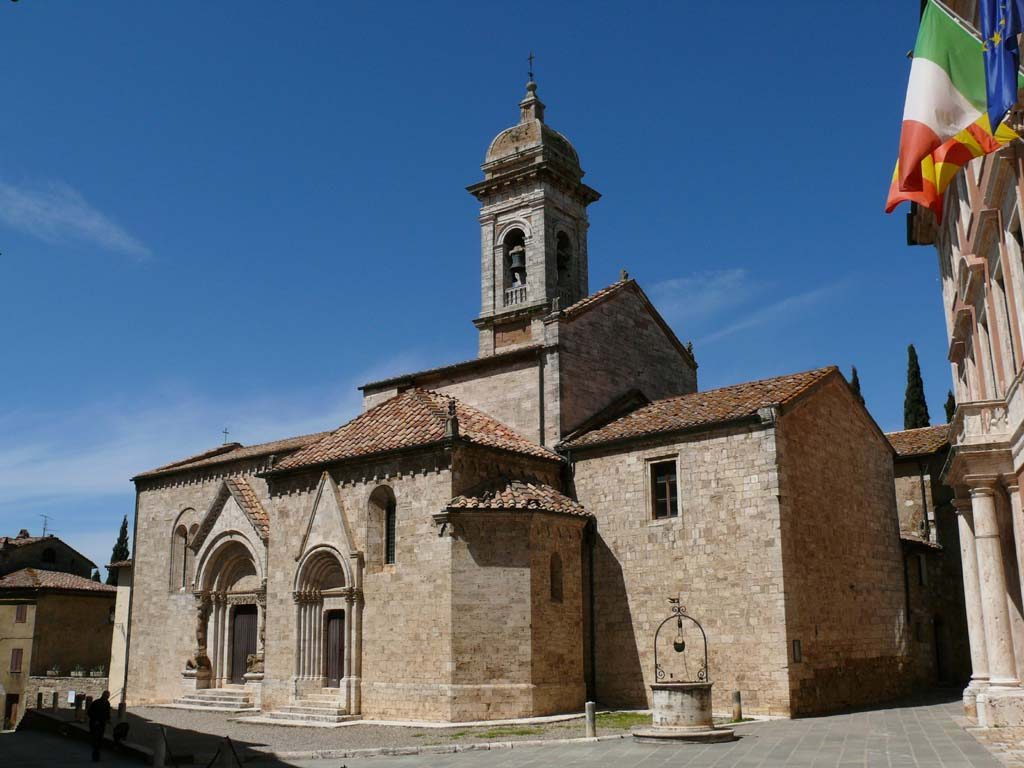
The Collegiata di San Quirico d'Orcia, 2008.

In connection with the Jubilee proclaimed by Pope Nicholas V for 1450, Henry undertook a pilgrimage to Rome. On the journey back, he died on 18 January 1451 (Note: The date of death 8 June 1450 in Schutte (1979), p. 41. Dek (1970), p. 67 and Vorsterman van Oyen (1882), p. 92 state the year 1450 only.) at Radicofani in Tuscany, about 30 km north of Lake Bolsena. Sources mention both plague and malaria as possible causes of death. Henry was buried in the Collegiata (a collegiate church where the daily office of worship is maintained by a college of canons) in the small city of San Quirico d'Orcia, located about 25 km north of Radicofani. (Note: Dek (1970), p. 67 states that Henry was buried in Radicofani on 1 February 1451.) It is obvious to assume that Henry was on his way to Siena, about 25 km north of San Quirico d'Orcia, to make his appearance before King Frederick III. It was in Siena that the first so-called meeting of Portugal took place on 8 February 1451. That marriage between Frederick III and Princess Eleonor of Portugal had been mediated by the Bishop of Siena, Eneas Silvio Piccolomini, who later became Pope Pius II.

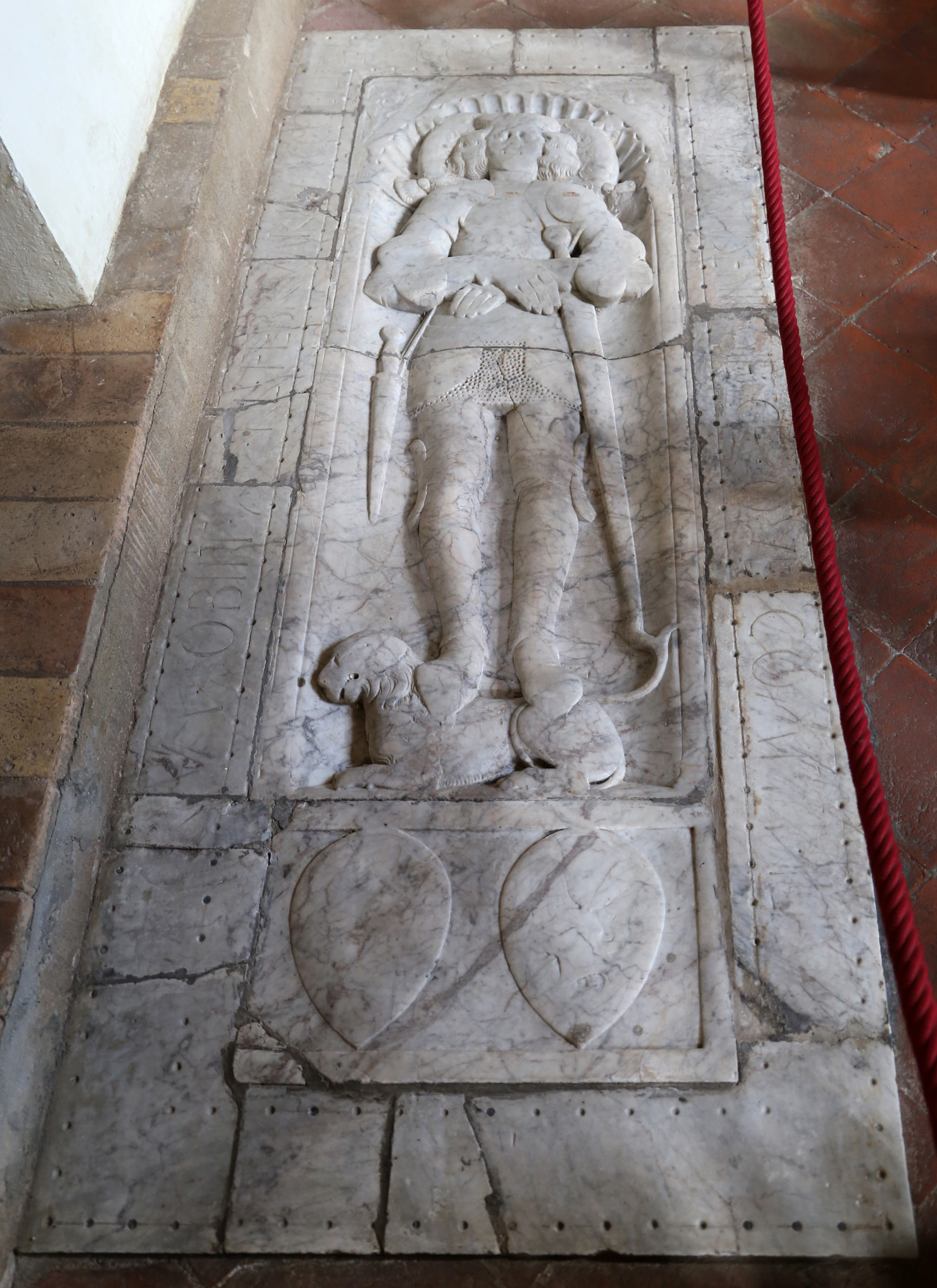
Tombstone of Count Henry II of Nassau-Siegen in the Collegiata in San Quirico d'Orcia, 2017.

The heavily worn tombstone shows in bas-relief a warrior in armour (chain mail, sword and dagger), except for the head, whose luxuriant hair is covered with a beret instead of a helmet. His feet rest on a lion. Of the original edge lettering, only a few words are still partly readable. At the foot end two coats of arms, which are completely worn. Henry's subjects from the city of Diez are said to have commissioned the tombstone. The coats of arms, which must have represented the coat of arms of Henry and that of his second consort, have a less usual shape, i.e. semicircular at the top and tapered at the bottom. This shape did occur in Italy in the 15th century. This could indicate that the citizens of Diez commissioned the tombstone to be made in Italy.

In order to prevent further wear of the tombstone, an unusual solution was chosen: the tombstone was bricked into the wall horizontally, i.e. with the long side resting on the floor. This may have been done as early as the 18th century. Later, they did not even refrain from building a wall against the head-end as a support for the stairs to a new pulpit, which was closed by an iron gate that conveniently was hammered into the tombstone. This is how a Dutch visitor found the tombstone in 1928, who complained that the unfortunate arrangement made it difficult to take a proper photograph of the tombstone. Nothing was known about the person depicted. According to local tradition, a certain Count of Nassau died at Radicofani and was interred in this church at his own request. The aforementioned visitor, however, was able to find the original text of the epitaph in the church archives, which read as follows: 'HENRICO GERMANICO NASSOVII VIANDENII DIETCEQUE COMITI ILLUSTRI A JUBILEO REDEUNTI SACRUM OBIIT XV KAL FEBRUARII MCCCCLI' (English translation: 'Dedicated to the illustrious German Count Henry of Nassau, Vianden and Diez died on the return journey from the Jubilee 18 January 1451').

The undignified fiddling with the tombstone was ended during a restoration of the church in 1936 by removing it from the wall and laying it flat in the floor again. During a new restoration in 1946, necessary due to repair of war damage sustained in June 1944, a skeleton de grande proportioni was found in the choir, which is believed to be the remains of Henry. Ten years later, at the insistence of the then Apostolic Internuncio in The Hague, a partition was made around the tombstone with a red cord. The completely faded Latin inscription with Italian translation was also applied to the wall above the tombstone.

== Marriages and issue ==
=== First marriage ===
Henry married in 1435 (Note: Van den Berg (1992), p. 89 and Dek (1970), p. 67 state the year 1435 with a question mark.) to Countess Genoveva of Virneburg (d. Breda, 18 April 1437), daughter of Count Rupert IV of Virneburg and his second wife Countess Agnes of Solms-Braunfels. The marriage contract was already approved by Duchess Elizabeth of Luxembourg on 15 May 1429. Genoveva was buried in Breda. (Note: Although it is not mentioned by the sources, it can be assumed that Genoveva was buried in the Grote Kerk in Breda, like the other Nassaus.)

From the marriage of Henry and Genoveva only one daughter was born:

1. Ottilie (before or on 18 April 1437 (Note: Schutte (1979), p. 41, Dek (1970), p. 67 and Vorsterman van Oyen (1882), p. 92 all state born in April 1437. Since her mother died on 18 April 1437 in Breda (in childbirth?), Ottilie must have been born before or no later than on 18 April 1437.) – July 1493 (Note: Dek (1970), p. 67 states only the year of death. Schutte (1979), p. 41 states died July (?) 1495. The year 1495 is probably an error because her first cousin of the same name died in that year.)), married:
  1. in 1449/1450 (Note: Dek (1970), p. 67 states the year 1450. Vorsterman van Oyen (1882), p. 92 states the year 1449.) to Count Philip the Younger of Katzenelnbogen (1427 – 27 February 1453 (Note: Vorsterman van Oyen (1882), p. 92 states the date of death 30 January 1454.)).
  2. on 3 June 1475 (Note: Vorsterman van Oyen (1882), p. 92 states the year 1471. Dek (1970), p. 67 does not mention a wedding date.) to Count Oswald I of Tierstein (Note: In older sources one can also find the spelling Thierstein.) (c. 1423 (Note: Dek (1970), p. 67 states the year 1423 without the circa. Vorsterman van Oyen (1882), p. 92 does not mention a date of birth.) – before 1488 (Note: Dek (1970), p. 67 states the year c. 1488. Vorsterman van Oyen (1882), p. 92 states the year c. 1486.)). Oswald was governor in the Alsace, the Sundgau and the Breisgau and councillor in Lorraine and the Electorate of Cologne.

=== Second marriage ===
Henry remarried in 1440 (Note: Schutte (1979), p. 41 states the year 1442.) to Lady Irmgard of Schleiden-Junkerath (Note: Vorsterman van Oyen (1882), p. 92 states that her given name was Ermgard.) (d. after 1450 (Note: Dek (1970), p. 67 states the year c. 1451. Vorsterman van Oyen (1882), p. 92 does not mention a date of death.)), daughter of Lord John III of Schleiden-Junkerath and Countess Joanne of Blankenheim. (Note: Dek (1970), p. 67 states that her parents were called 'Jan II, heer van Schleiden en Neuenstein' and 'Anna van Blankenheim'. Vorsterman van Oyen (1882), p. 92 states that her parents were called 'Jan II van Sleijden' and 'Johanna (Anna) Gravin van Blankenheim'.) The second marriage remained childless.

== Ancestors ==
Ancestors of Count Henry II of Nassau-Siegen
Great-great-grandparents	Henry I of Nassau-Siegen (c. 1270–1343) ⚭ before 1302; Adelaide of Heinsberg and Blankenberg (d. after 1343)	Philip II of Vianden (d. 1315/16) ⚭ Adelaide of Arnsberg (?–?)	Engelbert II of the Mark (d. 1328) ⚭ 1299; Matilda of Arberg (d. 1367)	Thierry VII of Cleves (1291–1347) ⚭ 1308; Margaret of Guelders and Zutphen (c. 1290–1331)	John I of Polanen (d. 1342) ⚭ Catherine of Brederode (1312/16–1372)	William VI of Horne (d. 1343) ⚭ 1315; Oda of Putten and Strijen (d. after 1327)	Simon I of Salm (d. 1346) ⚭ 1334; Mathilde of Saarbrücken (d. after 1354)	John of Valkenburg (d. 1356) ⚭ Mary of Herpen (d. after 1327)
Great-grandparents	Otto II of Nassau-Siegen (c. 1305–1350/51) ⚭ 1331; Adelaide of Vianden (d. 1376)		Adolf II of the Mark (d. 1347) ⚭ 1332; Margaret of Cleves (d. after 1348)		John II of Polanen (d. 1378) ⚭ 1348; Oda of Horne (d. before 1353)		John II of Salm (d. after 1400) ⚭ after 1355; Philippa of Valkenburg (?–?)	
Grandparents	John I of Nassau-Siegen (c. 1339–1416) ⚭ 1357; Margaret of the Mark (d. 1409)				John III of Polanen (d. 1394) ⚭ 1390; Odilia of Salm (d. 1428)			
Parents	Engelbert I of Nassau-Siegen (c. 1370–1442) ⚭ 1403; Joanne of Polanen (1392–1445)							

== Sources ==
- Becker, E. (1983) [1950]. Schloss und Stadt Dillenburg. Ein Gang durch ihre Geschichte in Mittelalter und Neuzeit. Zur Gedenkfeier aus Anlaß der Verleihung der Stadtrechte am 20. September 1344 herausgegeben (in German) (Neuauflage ed.). Dillenburg: Der Magistrat der Stadt Dillenburg.
- Van den Berg, F.M. (1992). "Een Nassau's graf in Italië". In Van der Klooster, L.J.; Tiethoff-Spliethoff, M.E.; Tamse, C.A. & Elzenga, E. (eds.). Militaire entourage rondom Oranje en andere bijdragen over het Huis van Oranje. Oranje-Nassau Museum Jaarboek 1992 (in Dutch). Zutphen: Walburg Pers. pp. 89–92. ISBN 90-6011-812-X.
- Dek, A.W.E. (1970). Genealogie van het Vorstenhuis Nassau (in Dutch). Zaltbommel: Europese Bibliotheek.
- Van Ditzhuyzen, Reinildis (2004) [1992]. Oranje-Nassau. Een biografisch woordenboek (in Dutch) (3rd ed.). Haarlem: Becht. ISBN 90-230-1124-4.
- Feith, W.G. (1921). "De eerste Nassau's in Nederland". Maandblad van het genealogisch-heraldisch genootschap: "De Nederlandsche Leeuw" (in Dutch). 1921 (9): 222.
- Huberty, Michel; Giraud, Alain & Magdelaine, F. & B. (1981). l'Allemagne Dynastique (in French). Vol. Tome III: Brunswick-Nassau-Schwarzbourg. Le Perreux: Alain Giraud. ISBN 2-901138-03-9.
- Jansen, H.P.H. (1979). "De Bredase Nassaus". In Tamse, C.A. (ed.). Nassau en Oranje in de Nederlandse geschiedenis (in Dutch). Alphen aan den Rijn: A.W. Sijthoff. pp. 11–40. ISBN 90-218-2447-7.
- Lück, Alfred (1981) [1967]. Siegerland und Nederland (in German) (2nd ed.). Siegen: Siegerländer Heimatverein e.V.
- De Roo van Alderwerelt, J.K.H. (1960). "De graven van Vianden. Bijdrage tot een genealogie van het geslacht der graven van Vianden tot de vererving van het graafschap in het Nassause huis". De Nederlandsche Leeuw, Maandblad van het Koninklijk Nederlandsch Genootschap voor Geslacht- en Wapenkunde (in Dutch). 1960 (6): 196.
- Schutte, O. (1979). "Genealogische gegevens". In Tamse, C.A. (ed.). Nassau en Oranje in de Nederlandse geschiedenis (in Dutch). Alphen aan den Rijn: A.W. Sijthoff. pp. 40–44. ISBN 90-218-2447-7.
- Vorsterman van Oyen, A.A. (1882). Het vorstenhuis Oranje-Nassau. Van de vroegste tijden tot heden (in Dutch). Leiden & Utrecht: A.W. Sijthoff & J.L. Beijers.

Henry II of Nassau-Siegen House of Nassau-Siegen Born: 7 January 1414 Died: 18 January 1451
Regnal titles
Preceded by Engelbert I	Count of Nassau-Siegen; 3 May 1442 – 18 January 1451	Succeeded by John IV
Preceded by Engelbert I	Count of Vianden; 3 May 1442 – 18 January 1451	Succeeded by John IV
Preceded by Engelbert I	Count of Diez; 3 May 1442 – 18 January 1451	Succeeded by John IV
Preceded by Engelbert I	Lord of Breda, etc. 3 May 1442 – 22 February 1447	Succeeded by John IV
