= Ottilie of Nassau-Siegen (1437–1493) =

German countess (1437–1493)

- Countess Consort of Katzenelnbogen; Countess Consort of Tierstein
- Coat of arms
- Full name: Ottilie Countess of Nassau-Siegen
- Native name: Ottilie Gräfin von Nassau-Siegen
- Born: Ottilie Gräfin zu Nassau, Vianden und Diez before or on 18 April 1437
- Died: July 1493
- Noble family: House of Nassau-Siegen
- Spouses: Philip the Younger of Katzenelnbogen; Oswald I of Tierstein
- Issue Detail: Ottilie of Katzenelnbogen
- Father: Henry II of Nassau-Siegen
- Mother: Genoveva of Virneburg

Countess Ottilie of Nassau-Siegen (Note: In many sources she is called Ottilie of Nassau-Dillenburg. The County of Nassau-Siegen is erroneously called Nassau-Dillenburg in many sources. The county was not named after the small, unimportant city of Dillenburg, which did not even have a church until 1491, but after the, for that time, large city of Siegen, the economic centre of the county and the counts' main residence. See Lück (1981), passim. It is also evident from the numbering of the reigning counts with the given name John. One John without regal number who ruled the County of Nassau-Dillenburg in the period 1303–1328, and eight counts by the name of John who ruled the County of Nassau-Siegen in the period 1362–1638.) (before or on 18 April 1437 – July 1493), German: Ottilie Gräfin von Nassau-Siegen, official titles: Gräfin zu Nassau, Vianden und Diez, was a countess from the House of Nassau-Siegen, a cadet branch of the Ottonian Line of the House of Nassau, and through marriage respectively Countess of Katzenelnbogen and Countess of Tierstein.

== Biography ==
Ottilie was born before or on 18 April 1437, (Note: Schutte (1979), p. 41, Dek (1970), p. 67 and Vorsterman van Oyen (1882), p. 92 all state born in April 1437. Since her mother died on 18 April 1437, Ottilie must have been born before or no later than on 18 April 1437.) possibly in Breda, (Note: Since her mother died in Breda (in childbirth?), Ottilie was probably born in that city.) as the only daughter of Count Henry II of Nassau-Siegen and his first wife Countess Genoveva of Virneburg.

Ottilie married in 1449/1450 (Note: Dek (1970), p. 67 states the year 1450. Vorsterman van Oyen (1882), p. 92 states the year 1449.) to Count Philip the Younger of Katzenelnbogen (1427 – 27 February 1453 (Note: Vorsterman van Oyen (1882), p. 92 states the date of death 30 January 1454.)), the eldest son of Count Philip the Elder of Katzenelnbogen and his first wife Countess Anne of Württemberg.

Following the death of her father in 1451, Ottilie claimed his part of the County of Diez as her inheritance. (Note: The sources do not mention whether Ottilie also claimed her father's part of the County of Vianden.) This led to a conflict with her paternal uncle Count John IV of Nassau-Siegen, who had succeeded his brother in all his possessions and was granted the County of Diez as a fief by Archbishop James I of Trier on 4 November 1451. The conflict was complicated further due to the fact that another part of the County of Diez belonged to Ottilie's father-in-law Philip the Elder of Katzenelnbogen.

Ottilie remarried on 3 June 1475 (Note: Vorsterman van Oyen (1882), p. 92 states the year 1471. Dek (1970), p. 67 does not mention a wedding date.) to Count Oswald I of Tierstein (Note: In older sources one can also find the spelling Thierstein.) (c. 1423 (Note: Dek (1970), p. 67 states the year 1423 without the circa. Vorsterman van Oyen (1882), p. 92 does not mention a date of birth.) – before 1488 (Note: Dek (1970), p. 67 states the year c. 1488. Vorsterman van Oyen (1882), p. 92 states the year c. 1486.)). Oswald was governor in the Alsace, the Sundgau and the Breisgau and councillor in Lorraine and the Electorate of Cologne.

In 1479 Count Philip the Elder of Katzenelnbogen died without male issue. He was succeeded by his daughter Anne and her husband Landgrave Henry III the Rich of Hesse-Marburg. Ottilie's daughter, Ottilie of Katzenelnbogen, however, also immediately laid claim to the County of Katzenelnbogen. On 6 May 1482 Ottilie of Katzenelnbogen renounced her claims to the counties Katzenelbogen and Diez and received financial compensation.

In 1481 Ottilie's first cousin Count John V of Nassau-Siegen fully succeeded in enforcing the still unfinished settlement of Ottilie's claims to the County of Diez. In 1485 Ottilie's second husband, Oswald I of Tierstein, attempted to murder John V of Nassau-Siegen because of his dissatisfaction with the marriage grant and the settlement of the inheritance. The Rentmeister of Siegen, Heinrich Weiß, was able to prevent the attempt. The settlement was finally confirmed in 1510.

Ottilie died in July 1493. (Note: Dek (1970), p. 67 mentions only the year of death. Schutte (1979), p. 41 states died July (?) 1495. The year 1495 is probably an error because her first cousin of the same name died in that year.)

== Issue ==
=== First marriage ===
From Ottilie's first marriage to Count Philip the Younger of Katzenelnbogen only one daughter was born:

1. Ottilie of Katzenelnbogen (c. 1451 – 15 August 1517), married in Koblenz on 19 December 1468 to Margrave Christopher I of Baden (13 November 1453 – Hohenbaden Castle, 19 April 1527 (Note: The date of death 29 April 1527 in Kleinschmidt, Arthur (1876). "Christoph I., Markgraf von Baden und Hochberg". Allgemeine Deutsche Biographie (in German). Vol. Band 4. Leipzig: Duncker & Humblot. p. 232.)).

The wedding of Ottilie and Christopher was a double wedding, as on the same day and location Christopher's sister Cimburga of Baden married Count Engelbert II the Illustrious of Nassau-Breda, the eldest son of Count John IV of Nassau-Siegen.

== Ancestors ==
Ancestors of Ottilie of Nassau-Siegen
Great-great-grandparents	Otto II of Nassau-Siegen (c. 1305–1350/51) ⚭ 1331; Adelaide of Vianden (d. 1376)	Adolf II of the Mark (d. 1347) ⚭ 1332; Margaret of Cleves (d. after 1348)	John II of Polanen (d. 1378) ⚭ 1348; Oda of Horne (d. before 1353)	John II of Salm (d. after 1400) ⚭ after 1355; Philippa of Valkenburg (?–?)	Rupert III of Virneburg (d. 1352) ⚭ Agnes (?–?)	? (?–?) ⚭ ? (?–?)	Bernhard of Solms (d. 1347/49) ⚭ ? (?–?)	Philip VI of Falkenstein (d. 1372/73) ⚭ before 1363; Agnes of Falkenstein (d. 1380)
Great-grandparents	John I of Nassau-Siegen (c. 1339–1416) ⚭ 1357; Margaret of the Mark (d. 1409)		John III of Polanen (d. 1394) ⚭ 1390; Odilia of Salm (d. 1428)		Adolf of Virneburg (d. 1383) ⚭ Jutta of Randerath (d. after 1380)		Otto I of Solms (d. 1410) ⚭ Agnes of Falkenstein (c. 1358–1409)	
Grandparents	Engelbert I of Nassau-Siegen (c. 1370–1442) ⚭ 1403; Joanne of Polanen (1392–1445)				Rupert IV of Virneburg (d. 1445) ⚭ Agnes of Solms-Braunfels (d. 1412/20)			
Parents	Henry II of Nassau-Siegen (1414–1451) ⚭ 1440; Genoveva of Virneburg (d. 1437)							

== Literature ==
- Demand, Karl E. (1955). "Die letzten Katzenelnbogener Grafen und der Kampf um ihr Erbe". Nassauische Annalen (in German). Vol. Band 66. Wiesbaden: Verein für Nassauische Altertumskunde und Geschichtsforschung. pp. 93–132.

== Sources ==
- Becker, E. (1983) [1950]. Schloss und Stadt Dillenburg. Ein Gang durch ihre Geschichte in Mittelalter und Neuzeit. Zur Gedenkfeier aus Anlaß der Verleihung der Stadtrechte am 20. September 1344 herausgegeben (in German) (Neuauflage ed.). Dillenburg: Der Magistrat der Stadt Dillenburg.
- Dek, A.W.E. (1970). Genealogie van het Vorstenhuis Nassau (in Dutch). Zaltbommel: Europese Bibliotheek.
- Van Ditzhuyzen, Reinildis (2004) [1992]. Oranje-Nassau. Een biografisch woordenboek (in Dutch) (3rd ed.). Haarlem: Becht. ISBN 90-230-1124-4.
- Huberty, Michel; Giraud, Alain & Magdelaine, F. & B. (1981). l'Allemagne Dynastique (in French). Vol. Tome III: Brunswick-Nassau-Schwarzbourg. Le Perreux: Alain Giraud. ISBN 2-901138-03-9.
- Jansen, H.P.H. (1979). "De Bredase Nassaus". In Tamse, C.A. (ed.). Nassau en Oranje in de Nederlandse geschiedenis (in Dutch). Alphen aan den Rijn: A.W. Sijthoff. pp. 11–40. ISBN 90-218-2447-7.
- Lück, Alfred (1981) [1967]. Siegerland und Nederland (in German) (2nd ed.). Siegen: Siegerländer Heimatverein e.V.
- Schutte, O. (1979). "Genealogische gegevens". In Tamse, C.A. (ed.). Nassau en Oranje in de Nederlandse geschiedenis (in Dutch). Alphen aan den Rijn: A.W. Sijthoff. pp. 40–44. ISBN 90-218-2447-7.
- Vorsterman van Oyen, A.A. (1882). Het vorstenhuis Oranje-Nassau. Van de vroegste tijden tot heden (in Dutch). Leiden & Utrecht: A.W. Sijthoff & J.L. Beijers.
