= Bundesautobahn 671 =

Federal motorway in Germany

A 671
- Bundesautobahn 671

Route information
- Length: 11.5 km (7.1 mi)

Location
- Country: Germany
- States: Hesse

Highway system
- Roads in Germany; Autobahns; List; Federal; List; State; E-roads

Bundesautobahn 671 (translates from German as Federal Motorway 671, short form Autobahn 671, abbreviated as BAB 671 or A 671) is an autobahn in the federal state of Hesse, Germany. It begins as a continuation of Mainzer Straße (Bundesstraße 263) in Wiesbaden from its junction with A 66 and connects the center of the Hessian capital city with A 60.

== Exit list ==
	(1)	Wiesbaden-Mainzer Straße A 66
	(2)	Wiesbaden / Mainz-Amöneburg
	(3)	Mainz-Kastel B 455
		Zur alten Römerstraße parking area
	(4)	Hochheim Nord B 40
	(5)	Hochheim Süd B 40
		Mainbrücke Hochheim 916 m
	(6)	Gustavsburg B 43
Intersection	(7)	Mainspitz-Dreieck A 60 E42
