= Bundesautobahn 648 =

Federal motorway in Germany

A 648
- Bundesautobahn 648

Route information
- Length: 6 km (3.7 mi)

Major junctions
- From: Eschborn

Location
- Country: Germany
- States: Hesse

Highway system
- Roads in Germany; Autobahns; List; Federal; List; State; E-roads

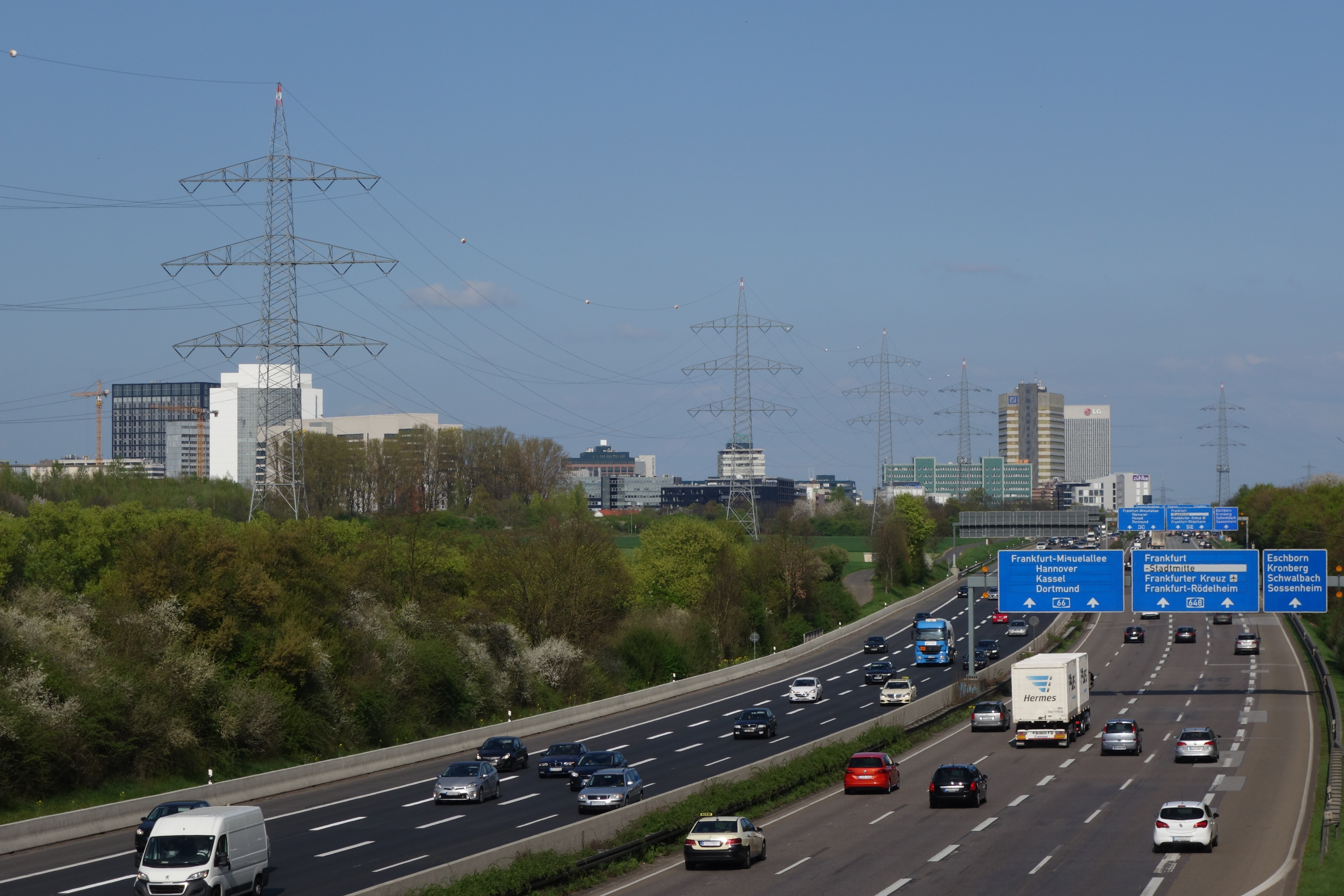
The A 648 begins as a junction of the A 66 at Eschborn (2nd and 3rd lanes from the right).

Bundesautobahn 648 (translates from German as Federal Motorway 648, short form Autobahn 648, abbreviated as BAB 648 or A 648) is a very short autobahn in Germany that connects the western part of Frankfurt am Main with the Alleenring, which is the outer ring road around Frankfurt. The A 648 is the most important way to the city and to the Frankfurt Trade Fair.

== Exit list ==
(1)	Eschborn 3-way interchange A 66
(2)	Frankfurt-Rödelheim
(3)	Frankfurt-Neufeld (only on request)
(3)	Westkreuz Frankfurt A 5
(4)	Frankfurt-Rebstock
	Tankstelle
(5)	Katharinenkreisel (former Opelrondell)
	End of Autobahn B 8
	(Theodor-Heuss-Allee)
6	Frankfurt - Messe
	Tankstelle
7	Frankfurt - Europaviertel
8	Ludwig-Erhardt-Anlage
