= Nordwestkreuz Frankfurt =

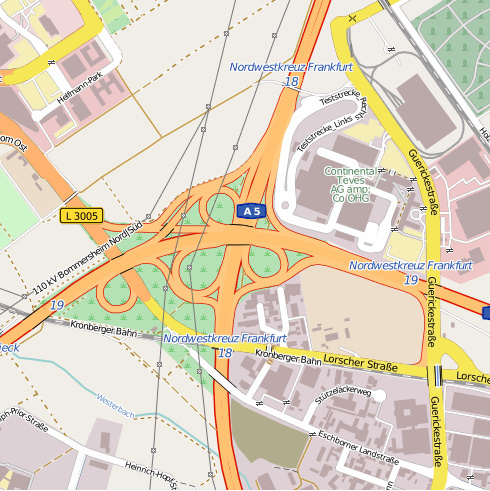

Location
- Frankfurt, Germany
- Coordinates: 50°8′3″N 8°35′28″E
- Roads at junction: A 5; A 66

Construction
- Type: Cloverleaf interchange

The Nordwestkreuz Frankfurt is a cloverleaf interchange in Frankfurt. Here, the Bundesautobahn 5 (Hattenbacher Dreieck - Frankfurt am Main - Basel) and the Bundesautobahn 66 (Wiesbaden - Fulda) intersect. Roadways and bridges to L3005 from Rödelheim to Eschborn are also integrated into the interchange.
