= Hessisches Staatsarchiv Marburg =

German archive

Coordinates: 50.8038°N 8.7630°E

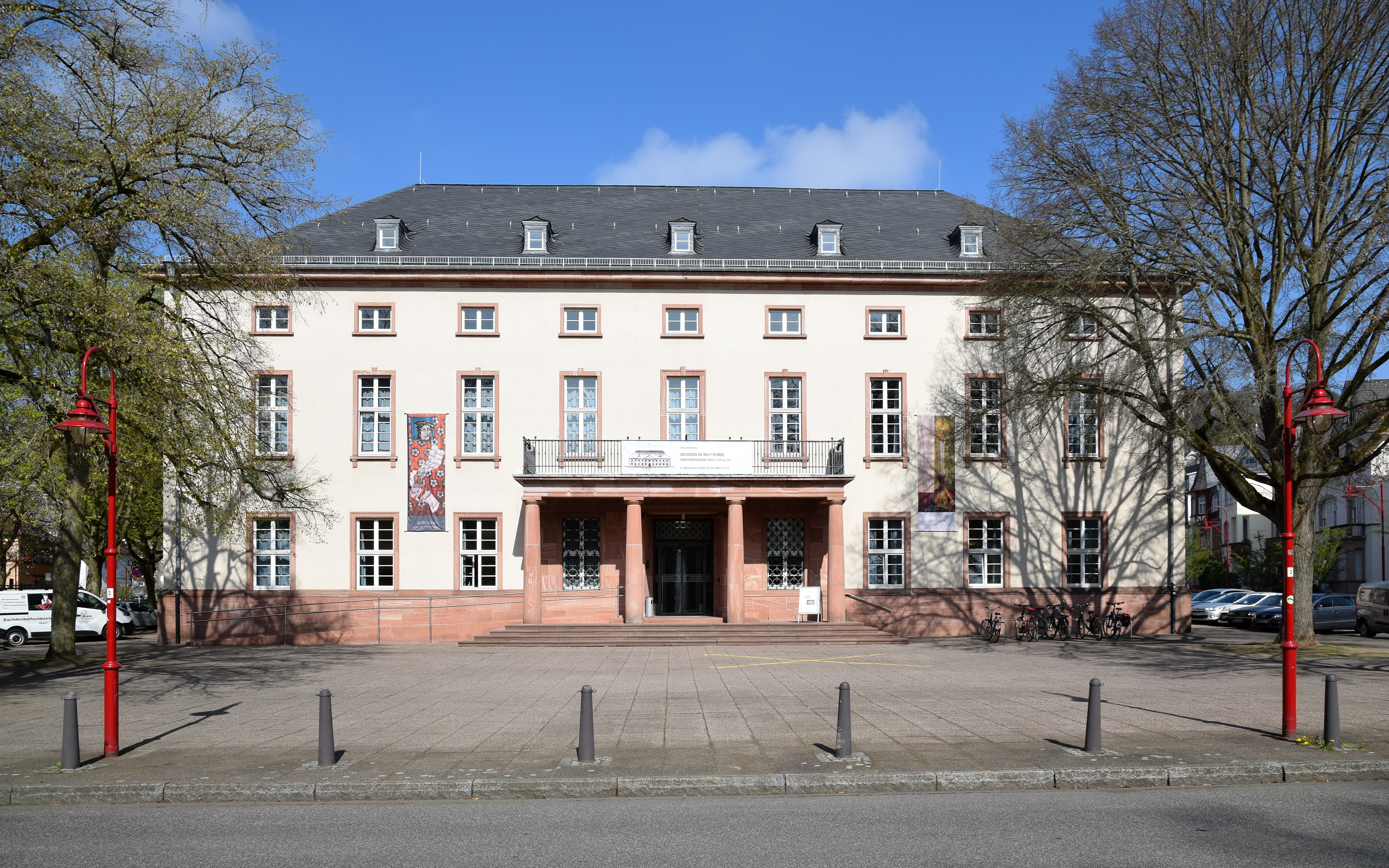
Hessisches Staatsarchiv Marburg

The Hessisches Staatsarchiv Marburg (HStAM, "Hessian State Archives in Marburg") is one of the three archives of the Hessisches Landesarchiv and is based in Marburg upon Lahn.
