= County of Diez =

County of the Holy Roman Empire

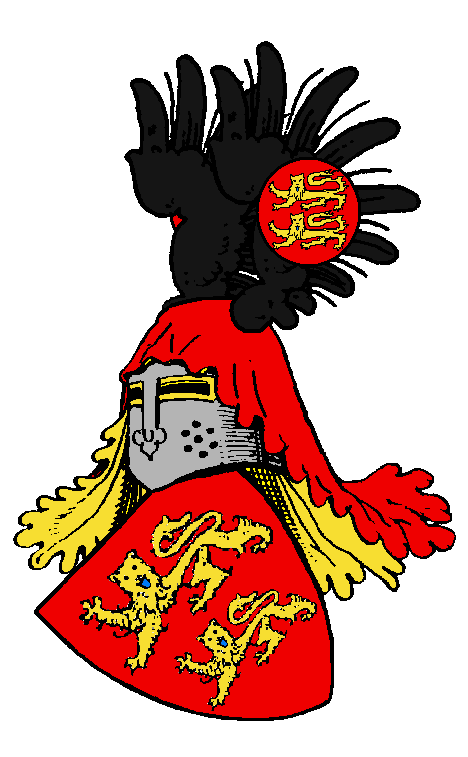
The coat of arms of the Counts of Diez, "Gules, two gold leopards passant Or."

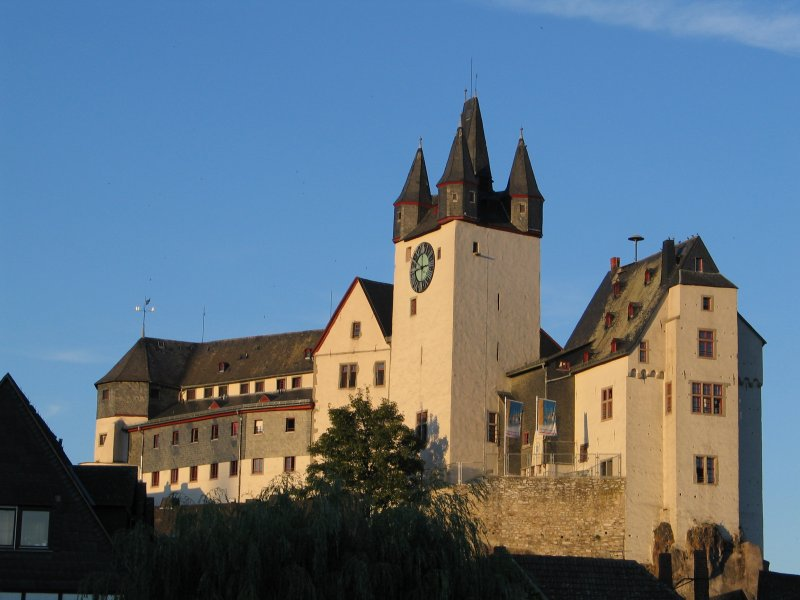
The Grafenschloss Diez above Diez

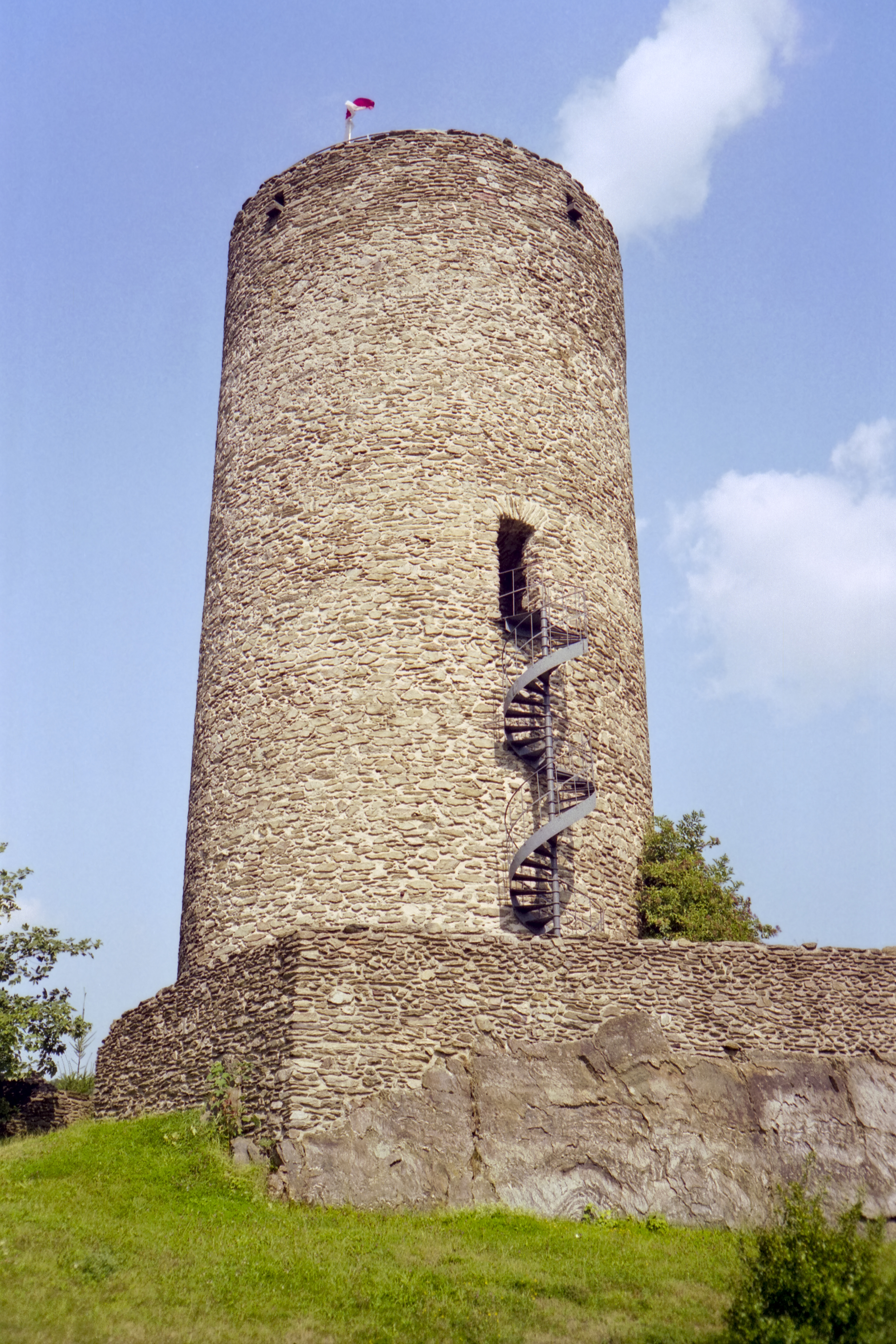
The keep of Altweilnau Castle.

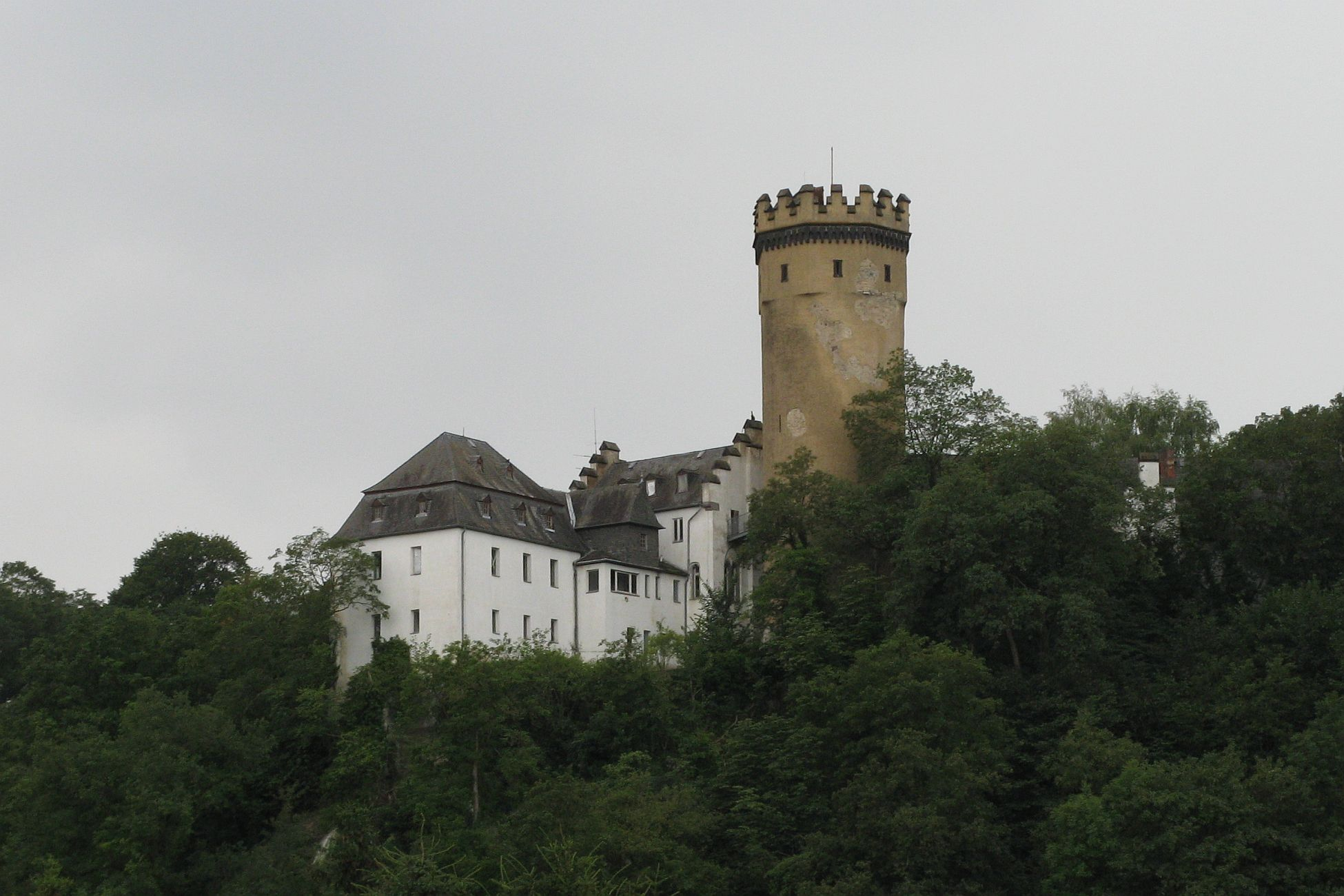
Dehrn Castle, constructed by the Counts of Diez in the 12th century.

The County of Diez (also known as Dietz, German: Grafschaft Diez) was a county of the Holy Roman Empire, centred around Grafenschloss in Diez, located in Lahngau (in modern German states of Hesse and Rhineland-Palatinate). The county is first recorded in 1073, likely formed from the lands of the Conradine dynasty after their relocation to Swabia. The Counts of Diez gained prominence in the late twelfth century as strong supporters of the Hohenstaufen dynasty, earning it the nickname "Golden County."

However, following the downfall of the Hohenstaufens in 1254, the influence of the Counts of Diez waned. In 1302, the County of Weilnau was carved out of Diez to establish a separate branch, based at Altweilnau Castle. Over time, the remaining County of Diez gradually lost territories through pawning to settle debts. By 1388, upon the death of the last count, the County was inherited by Adolf I, Count of Nassau-Siegen.

== History ==
The County likely emerged as a successor to the original county of the Conradines in Niederlahngau, following their relocation from Franconia to Swabia. The Counts of Diez likely hailed from the Nahe river valley and received the county on the Lahn river as a fief from the Salian dynasty, which later became hereditary. Their seat was at Diez, with their territory extending northeast along the Lahn river to Weilburg, north into the Westerwald, and southeast into the Goldener Grund.

The earliest documented mention of the Counts of Diez dates back to 1073 when Count Embricho and his brother of Diez (Didesse) sold property in Badenheim to the Stift of St. Viktor vor Mainz in Mainz-Weisenau. A Count Embrichio is recorded in Niederlahngau from 1059, with his likely brother, Count Godebald, appearing in records from 1053. Embricho, who served as Bishop of Augsburg from 1063 to 1077, was probably a close relative of Count Embricho.

=== Peak under the Hohenstaufens ===
During the Hohenstaufen era, particularly under Frederick Barbarossa, the counts of Diez experienced their zenith. Likely due to a matrimonial alliance with the Nürings, Henry II of Diez (r. 1145-1189) inherited significant estates in the Wetterau region. He accompanied Barbarossa on his Italian Campaigns and engaged in diplomatic missions there, a tradition continued by his son Henry III. In 1207, Henry III and his brother Gerhard II relinquished control of the Vogtei of Mainz-Kastel to King Philip of Swabia in exchange for imperial immediacy and patronage over the churches in Usingen. Gerhard II also served on the regency council of Henry (VII) of Germany. Henry and Gerhard founded the Stift at Salz as a dynastic institution for the counts of Diez, which was later merged into the collegiate church of Diez in 1289 by Count Gerhard VII.

The territory was contemporaneously known as the "Golden County." They exercised jurisdiction over the blood court at various locations including Altendiez, Flacht, Hahnstätten, Lindenholzhausen, Dauborn, Niederhadamar (Dehrner Zent), Hundsangen, Nentershausen, Meudt, Salz, Rotzenhahn (Rotenhain), Hoen-Rennerod, Villmar, Schupbach, Panrod, Kirberg, Camberg, Lahr, Elsoff, Blessenberg (Frickhofen), and Niederzeuzheim.

=== Decline ===
The decline of the Counts of Diez commenced toward the close of the thirteenth century with the partition of their domain with the collateral Weilnau line, centered initially at Altweilnau and later at Neuweilnau from 1302 onwards. With the demise of the Hohenstaufen dynasty, the family's sway in Imperial politics dwindled. Subsequent economic hardships ensued, compelling the counts to divest themselves of territories.

By 1302, the two lines had formally separated, each establishing independent counties. In 1326, the Weilnau line relocated its seat to Birstein in the Vogelsberg region. Their holdings in the Lahn river valley were largely absorbed by the House of Nassau.

In the ensuing years, the weakened Diez line experienced a series of setbacks, losing numerous possessions and privileges. Many of these were mortgaged to their more influential neighbors, including Nassau, the Electorate of Trier, the County of Katzenelnbogen, and the Lords of Eppstein. Count Gottfried (1303-1348) was deemed mentally unfit, leading Emicho I, Count of Nassau-Hadamar, to assume guardianship of his fiefs from 1317 to 1332. Following 1332, Gottfried's son Gerhard VI served as regent until his demise on 17 October 1343 during a confrontation with Limburg.

=== Afterlife ===
The last Count of Diez, Gerhard VII, died in 1388. The remaining portion of the county then transferred through his daughter Jutta to his son-in-law, Adolf I, Count of Nassau-Siegen. By this time, a significant portion of the County had been transferred to various creditors. Upon Adolf of Nassau-Siegen's death in 1420, he left no direct male heirs. Consequently, only half of Diez remained under the House of Nassau. The remainder of the County, inherited by Adolf's daughter Jutta, passed to her son-in-law, Gottfried VII of Eppstein-Münzenberg.

The House of Eppstein sold half of their share to the Counts of Katzenelnbogen in 1453. Upon the extinction of the Katzenelnbogen line in 1453, this portion transferred to the Landgraviate of Hesse, which ceded it to Nassau-Dillenburg on 30 June 1557. The remaining quarter, retained by the Counts of Eppstein, was acquired by the Electorate of Trier in 1535. In the Diez Treaty of 1564, Nassau-Dillenburg and the Electorate divided the county between themselves.

In 1606, the House of Nassau established the new county of Nassau-Dietz, from which the current royal family of the Netherlands, the House of Orange-Nassau, descends. Nassau-Dietz was later occupied by France in 1795 during the Napoleonic Wars and became part of the Duchy of Nassau in 1815.

== Coats of Arms ==
- The original coat of arms, as evidenced by seals from 1308 and 1346, features two golden Leopards on a red background. The helm is adorned with rays and red-gold mantling.
- The later hereditary arms maintain the same design, with the addition of a black headdress atop the helm, supporting a round red disc embellished with two golden leopards.
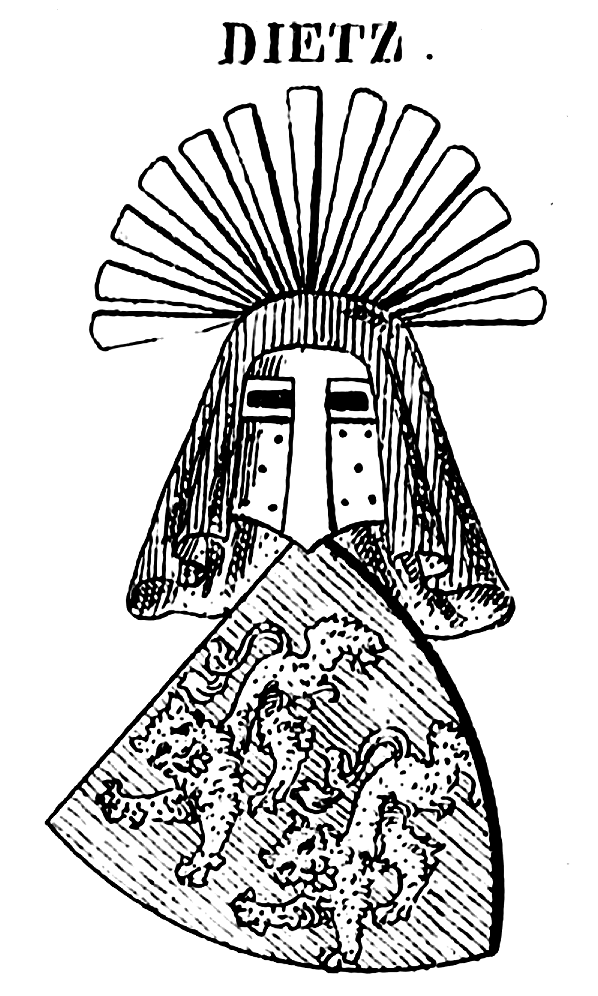
Ancestral arms as depicted in J. Siebmacher’s großes und allgemeines Wappenbuch, based on Count Gottfried's seals from 1308 and 1346.

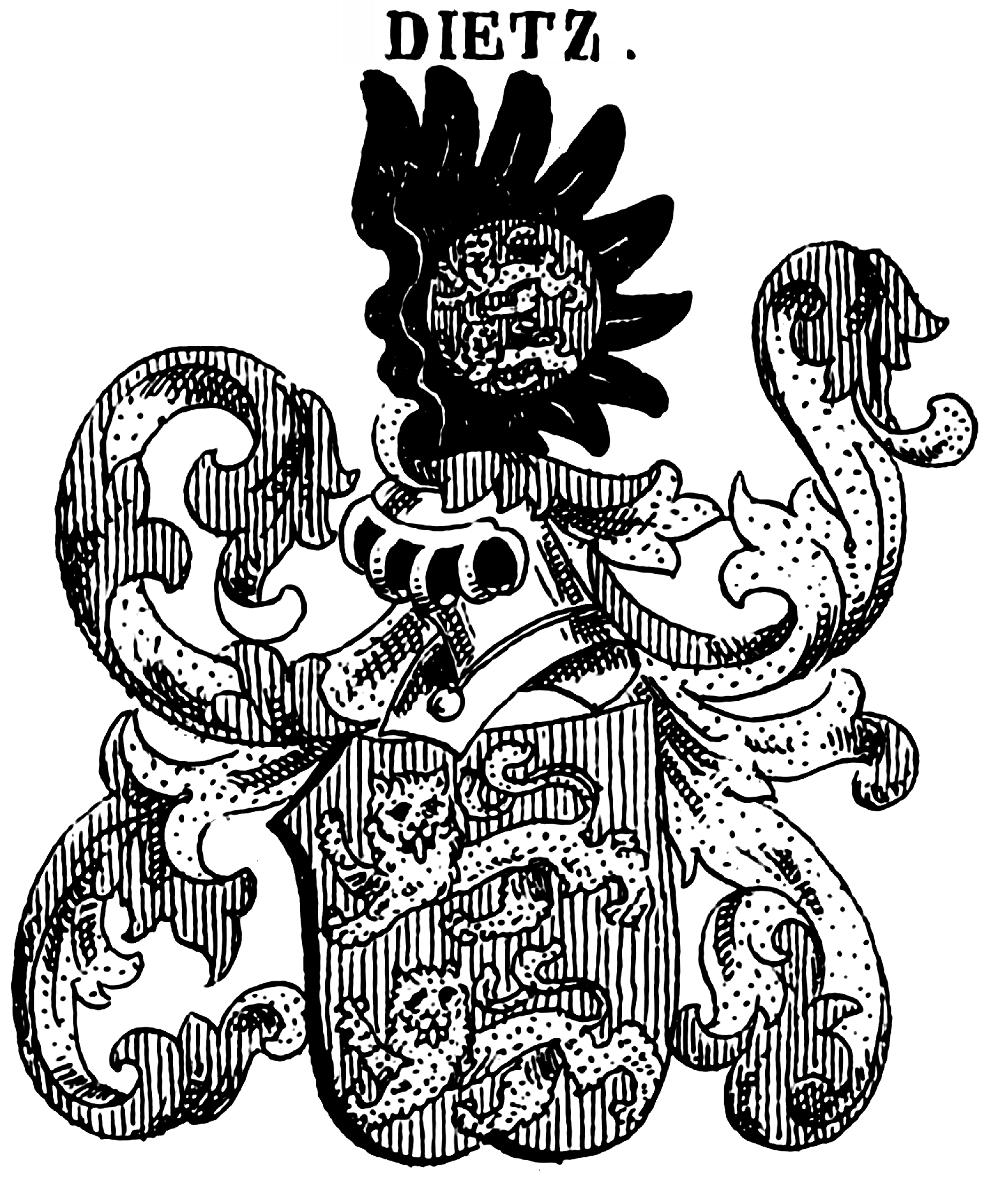
Later hereditary arms as illustrated in Siebmacher's Wappenbuch.

== List of Counts ==
Probably counts of Diez:

- Embricho (before 1059 - after 1073)
- Godebold (before 1053 - after 1073)

Counts of the Diez line:

- Brothers Henry I and Gerhard I (before 1101 - after 1107)
- Embricho II (before 1145)
- Henry II (1145–1189)
- Brothers Gerhard II (1189–1223) and Henry III (1189–1234); Henry founded the Weilnau line in 1208
- Gerhard III (1234–1276)
- Gerhard IV (1281–1306)
- Brothers Gerhard V (1301 – before 1308) and Gottfried (1303–1348)
- Gerhard VI (1317–17 October 1343)
- Gerhard VII (1347–1388)
- Jutta (1368–1397), married to Adolf I, Count of Nassau-Siegen

Counts of the Weilnau line:

- Henry III (1189–1234)
- Brothers Gerhard I (1274–1282) and Henry I (1249–1275)
- Brothers Henry II (1282–1344) and Reinhard I (1282–1333), sons of Gerhard I, and their cousin Henry III (1275–1307), son of Henry I
- Gerhard II (1360–1389), descendant of Reinhard I
- Henry IV (1389–1413)
- Brothers Adolf (1420–1451), Henry V (1426–before 1438), and Reinhard II (1424–1472)

=== Counts of Diez (Hesse) ===
The children of Landgrave Philip I of Hesse from his second, morganatic marriage to Margarethe von der Saale, were granted the title "Counts of Diez" (in full, "Born of House Hesse, Counts of Diez, Lords of Lissberg and Bickenbach").

- Philip (1541–1569)
- Herman (1542–1568)
- Christopher Ernest (1543–1603)
- Margarita (1544–1608)
- Albert (1546–1569)
- Philip Conrad (1547–1569)
- Moritz (1553–1575)
- Ernest (1554–1570)

All seven sons died unmarried, without legitimate offspring. Margarita married John Bernhard, Count of Neu-Eberstein.

== Bibliography ==
- Karl Ernst Demandt: Geschichte des Landes Hessen. 2nd edition, Kassel 1972 (pp. 405–410).
- Hellmuth Gensicke: Landesgeschichte des Westerwalds. Wiesbaden 1958.
- Hermann Heck. "Bilder aus der Geschichte der Grafschaft und der Stadt Diez." Zeitschrift für Heimatkunde des Regierungsbezirkes Coblenz und der angrenzenden Gebiete von Hessen-Nassau, Coblenz 1921. (Teil 1, Teil 2)
- Hermann Heck. "Die Entstehung der Grafschaft Diez und der Ursprung des Diezer Grafenhauses." Zeitschrift für Heimatkunde des Regierungsbezirkes Coblenz und der angrenzenden Gebiete von Hessen-Nassau, Coblenz 1921 (dilibri.de)
- Michael Hollmann and Michael Wettengel. Nassaus Beitrag für das heutige Hessen. Wiesbaden 1992 (pp. 15, 24–25).
- Klaus Eiler. "Politischer Umbruch an der unteren Lahn in den Grafschaften Katzenelnbogen und Diez im 16. Jahrhundert." Nassauische Annalen 1989, pp. 97–114.
- Wolf-Heino Struck. "Kircheninventare der Grafschaft Diez von 1525/26 und ihr zeitgeschichtlicher Hintergrund. Ein Beitrag zur Geschichte des landesherrlichen Kirchenregiments." Nassauische Annalen 1957, p. 58.
