= Wolf-Heino Struck =

German regional historian, medievalist and archivist (1911–1991)

Wolf-Heino Struck (born 27 March 1911 in Schwerin; died 10 August 1991 in Wiesbaden) was a German historian and archivist. He was director of the Hessian Central State Archives in Wiesbaden. He earned acclaim for his research of the history of the Lahn region.

== Life and career ==
The son of middle school teachers, he attended the Realgymnasium until 1929. After graduation he studied law at the University of Freiburg, with an emphasis on legal history, economics, and state law. From the winter of 1929 until the summer of 1930 he studied at Humboldt University of Berlin. He studied German, English, and German studies in Berlin from the winter of 1930 until the summer of 1931 and continued his studies at the University of Rostock in the winter of 1931. He received his doctorate from Rostock in 1935 with his dissertation, Die Geschichte der mittelalterlichen Selbstverwaltung in den mecklenburgischen Landstädten (The History of Medieval Self-government in the Rural Towns of Mecklenburg). A year later he passed the test to teach at secondary schools.

Rather than going into teaching, Struck decided on a career as an archivist. He attended the Institute for Archival Science and Historical Studies at the Prussian Privy State Archives in Dahlem, Berlin from April of 1936 until September of 1937. Subsequently, he worked as a research assistant. Starting in 1938, he worked as an assessor at the State Archives in Zerbst. After military service and being wounded in World War II, he continued his employment in Zerbst until the end of 1945. From January 1948 until his retirement in 1976 he was employed by the Hessian State Archives in Wiesbaden, where he first worked as a researcher until 1951, then as an archivist and senior archivist until 1970, and finally as the director of the archives until 1976. He led the institution from 1971 until his retirement.

Between 1972 and 1978 he was managing editor for the Nassau Annals. Struck was a member of the Mecklenburg Historical Society (1932-1945), the Nassau Historical Research and Antiquities Association, as well as the Nassau Historical Commission, where he served as its first chairman from 1975 until 1990. He was a board member of the Nassau Historical Research and Antiquities Association, and for many years served as treasurer.

Beyond his actual archival work, Struck was in many respects occupied with the subject of German history. His main areas of research included the history of the monasteries and stifts of the Lahn region, the German Peasants' War, and a comprehensive depiction of the Duchy of Nassau in the years 1806-1866. He came to the conclusion that, in the fifty-year period between 1816 and 1866, approximately 34,000 people emigrated from the Duchy of Nassau. For the project, Germania Sacra, he managed the volumes covering the stifts in Diez, Dietkirchen, Idstein, and Weilburg.

For his accomplishments in the field of historical science, Struck was awarded an honorary professorship by the University of Frankfurt in 1975, as well as the Order of Merit of the Federal Republic of Germany in 1979. In commemoration of his 80th birthday, the 1991 volume of the Nassau Annals was dedicated to him.

== Selected works ==
- Wiesbaden im Biedermeier. (1818–1866) (= Geschichte der Stadt Wiesbaden. Vol. 5 = Wiesbaden als nassauische Landeshauptstadt. No. 2). Steiner, Wiesbaden 1981, ISBN 3-515-03405-6.
- Wiesbaden in der Goethezeit. (1803–1818) (= Geschichte der Stadt Wiesbaden. Vol. 4 = Wiesbaden als nassauische Landeshauptstadt. No. 1). Steiner, Wiesbaden 1979, ISBN 3-515-03220-7.
- Johannisberg im Rheingau. Eine Kloster-, Dorf-, Schloss- und Weinchronik. Kramer, Frankfurt am Main 1977, ISBN 3-7829-0191-6.
- Der Bauernkrieg am Mittelrhein und in Hessen. Darstellung und Quellen (= Veröffentlichungen der Historischen Kommission für Nassau. Vol. 21, ISSN 0170-1568). Self-published by the Nassau Historical Commission, Wiesbaden 1975.
- Die Auswanderung aus dem Herzogtum Nassau. (1806–1866). Ein Kapitel der modernen politischen und sozialen Entwicklung (= Geschichtliche Landeskunde. Vol. 4, ISSN 0072-4203). Steiner, Wiesbaden 1966.
- Geschichte von Hattersheim. Gemeindeverwaltung Hattersheim, Hattersheim 1964.
- Die Geschichte der mittelalterlichen Selbstverwaltung in den mecklenburgischen Landstädten (= Mecklenburgische Jahrbücher. Vol. 101, 1937, Beiheft, ISSN 0930-8229). Klinz, Rostock 1938, (Rostock, University, Dissertation), online (in German).
