= Schiersteiner Straße =

Major road in Wiesbaden, Germany

Coordinates: 50.0708°N 8.2274°E

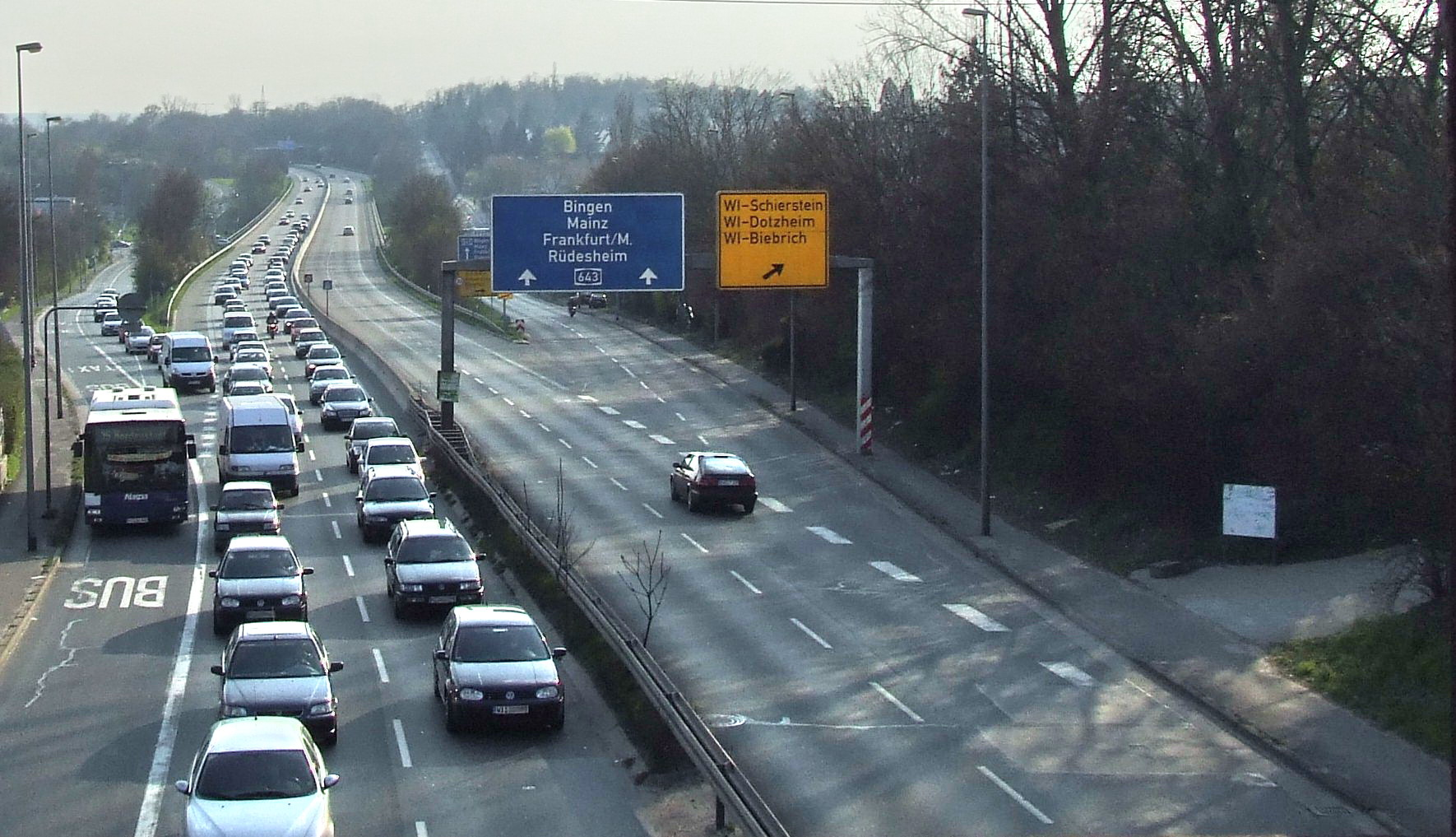
Rush hour jam towards Wiesbaden in the morning at the south end

Schiersteiner Straße is a major arterial road in Wiesbaden, Germany, running from Ringstraße at the north end, south towards as continuation of Bundesautobahn 643 through the suburb of Rheingauviertel. The Schiersteiner Straße is a four lane street and part of Bundesstraße 262. Together with the Mainzer Straße and the Ringstraße, it is a busy southern arterial road in Wiesbaden, often congested during peak hours.
