= Bundesautobahn 66 =

Federal motorway in Germany

A 66
- Bundesautobahn 66

Route information
- Length: 125.1 km (77.7 mi) (planned: 127.3 km)

Major junctions
- East end: Bundesautobahn 7 in Eichenzell
- West end: Borsigallee in Frankfurt am Main

Location
- Country: Germany
- States: Hesse

Highway system
- Roads in Germany; Autobahns; List; Federal; List; State; E-roads
| ← A 65 | → A 67 |

Bundesautobahn 66 (translates from German as Federal Motorway 66, short form Autobahn 66, abbreviated as BAB 66 or A 66) is an autobahn in southwestern Germany. It connects the Taunus to Fulda, passing close to Frankfurt am Main. The first part of the autobahn, between Wiesbaden and the Nordwestkreuz Frankfurt, was opened as early as 1934, then called the Rhein-Main-Schnellweg. It became an autobahn in 1965.

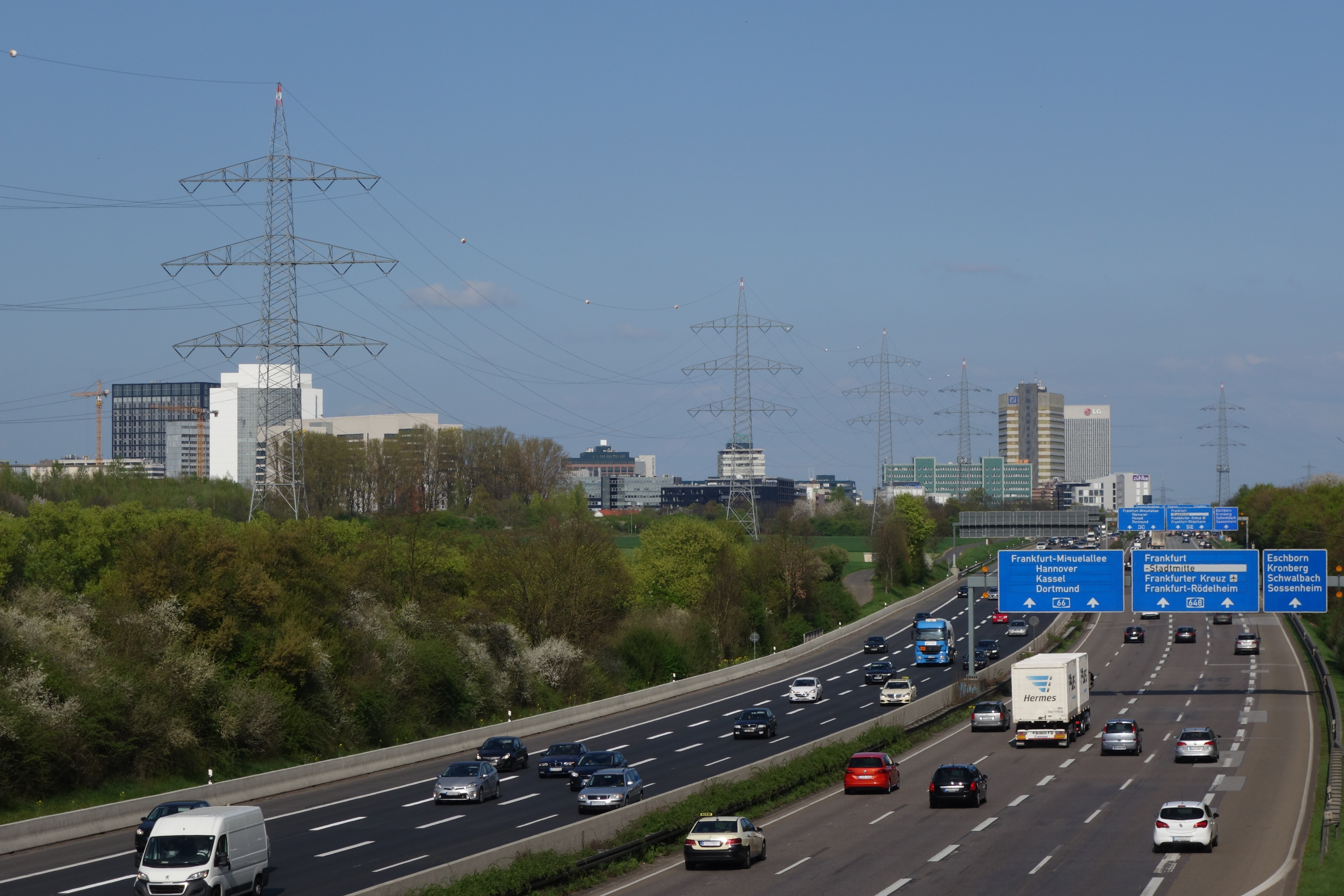
A 66 between Eschborn (left) and Sossenheim, near Frankfurt-Höchst; Bundesautobahn 648 begins here

The autobahn is incomplete; there still is a gap within Frankfurt city borders. A tunnel was proposed as a solution; however, this has not been implemented because of the high cost of construction. A new section of roadway to close a second gap southwest of Fulda was opened to traffic on 13 September 2014. The section includes a 1.6-kilometre (1.0 mi) cut-and-cover tunnel and replaces a diversion which saw traffic routed onto the B 40 for approximately 9 kilometers before rejoining the A 66 just prior to the junction with the A 7; the new segment cost 154 million euros. A portion of the Kinzig Valley Railway line was also rerouted along the new autobahn segment, which cost an additional 60 million euros.

Near Frankfurt-Höchst, the highway is one of the busiest in Germany with an average of more than 130,000 vehicles per day.

Between Zeilsheim and Eschborn the A 66 follows the course of a Roman road, which later in the Middle Ages had been given the name Elisabethenstraße, because it was part of the pilgrimage route to the grave of Elizabeth of Hungary in Marburg.

== Exit list ==
Legend:

- I/C - Interchange, I/S - Intersection, RSA - Rest and service area, OBR - Overhead bridge restaurant, R/R - Restaurant and rest plaza, L/B - Layby, V/P - Vista point, TN - tunnel, T/P - Toll plaza, BR - Bridge
- C - Cloverleaf, S - Stack, T-A - Trumpet-A, T-B - Trumpet-B, DT - Directional-T/Y, SDT - Semi-Directional-T/Y, P-Y - Partial-Y, D - Diamond, P-C - Partial cloverleaf, D-D - Diverging diamond, D-R - Direct ramp

B 42
| | | Walluf (planned) |
| | (2) | Wiesbaden-Frauenstein |
| | (3) | Schiersteiner Kreuz A 643 |
| | (4) | Wiesbaden-Biebrich |
| | (5) | Wiesbaden-Mainzer Straße |
| | (6) | Wiesbaden-Erbenheim B 455 |
| | | Tankstelle Wiesbaden-Erbenheim |
| | (7) | Wiesbaden-Nordenstadt |
| | (8) | Wallau |
| | (9) | Wiesbadener Kreuz A 3 |
| | (10) | Diedenbergen |
| | (11) | Hofheim am Taunus B 40 B 519 |
| | | Tankstelle Weilbach |
| | (12) | Hattersheim-Westteil |
| | (12) | Hattersheim-Ostteil |
| | (13) | Krifteler Dreieck B 40 |
| | (14) | Frankfurt-Zeilsheim |
| | (15) | Kelkheim |
| | (16) | Frankfurt-Höchst B 8 |
| | | Tankstelle Frankfurt |
| | (17) | Eschborn |
| | (18) | Eschborner Dreieck A 648, B 8 |
| | (19) | Nordwestkreuz Frankfurt A 5 |
| | (20) | Frankfurt-Ludwig-Landmann-Straße B 44 |
| | | Niddabrücke |
| | | Volkspark Niddatal 540 m |
| | (21) | Frankfurt-Miquelallee B 8 |
| | | Tunnel Alleentunnel 2800 m (planned) |
| | | Frankfurt-Bornheim (planned) |
| Intersection | | 3-way interchange F-Seckbach (planned) A 661 |
| | | Tunnel Galerie Seckbacher Landstraße 240 m |
| | | Baustelle Riedgrabentalbrücke 265 m |
| Intersection | | 3-way interchange Erlenbruch A 661 |
| | | Riederwaldtunnel 1095 m/1025 m |
| | (32) | Frankfurt-Borsigallee |
| | (32) | Frankfurt-Bergen-Enkheim will be closed |
| | (33) | Maintal-Bischofsheim B 8 B 40 |
| | (34) | Maintal-Dörnigheim |
| | (35) | Hanau-West |
| | (36) | Hanau-Nord B 45 |
| | (37) | Hanau-Stadtmitte B 8/Erlensee |
| | | Kinzigbrücke 50 m |
| | (38) | Hanauer Kreuz A 45 B 43a |
| | (39) | Langenselbolder Dreieck A 45 |
| | (40) | Langenselbold |
| | (41) | Gründau-Rothenbergen |
| | (42) | Gründau-Lieblos B 457 |
| | | Kinzigbrücke 50 m |
| | (43) | Gelnhausen-West |
| | | Rest area Kinzigtal |
| | (44) | Gelnhausen-Ost |
| | (45) | Bad Orb/Wächtersbach B 276 |
| | | Rest area Salmünster (planned) |
| | (46) | Bad Soden-Salmünster |
| | | Kinzigbrücke 985 m |
| | | Ulmbachtalbrücke 225 m |
| | (47) | Steinau an der Straße |
| | | Steinautalbrücke 541 m |
| | (48) | Schlüchtern-Süd |
| | | Straßen- und Bahnbbrücke 110 m |
| | | Hagerwassertalbrücke 200 m |
| | (49) | Schlüchtern-Nord |
| | | Bahnbrücke 144 m |
| | (50) | Flieden |
| | (51) | Neuhof-Süd |
| | | Tunnel Neuhof 1590 m / 1610 m |
| | (52) | Neuhof-Nord |
| | (53) | Fulda-Süd B 27 |
| | | Fuldatalbrücke 489 m |
| | (54) | Eichenzell |
| | (55) | Dreieck Fulda 3-way interchange A 7 E45 |
