= Wiesbaden-Südost =

Südost
- Borough of Wiesbaden
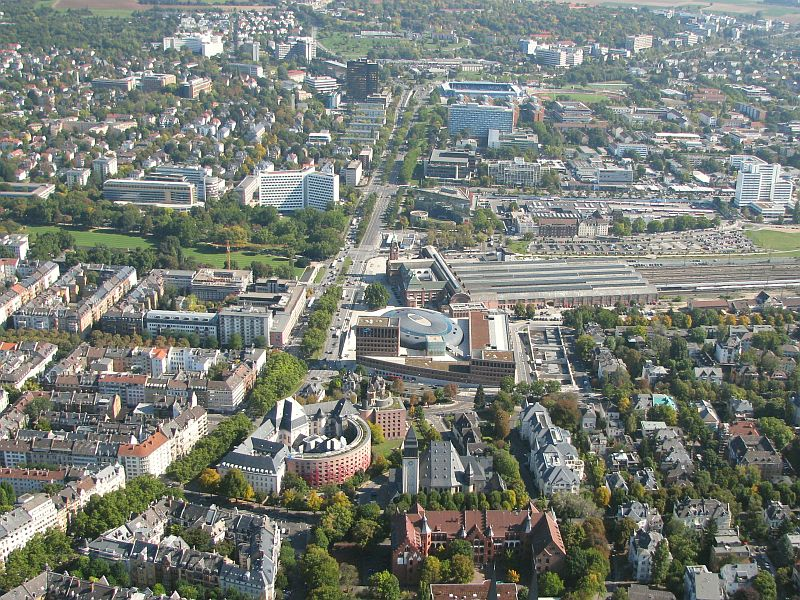
- Südost (upper right) with the central station

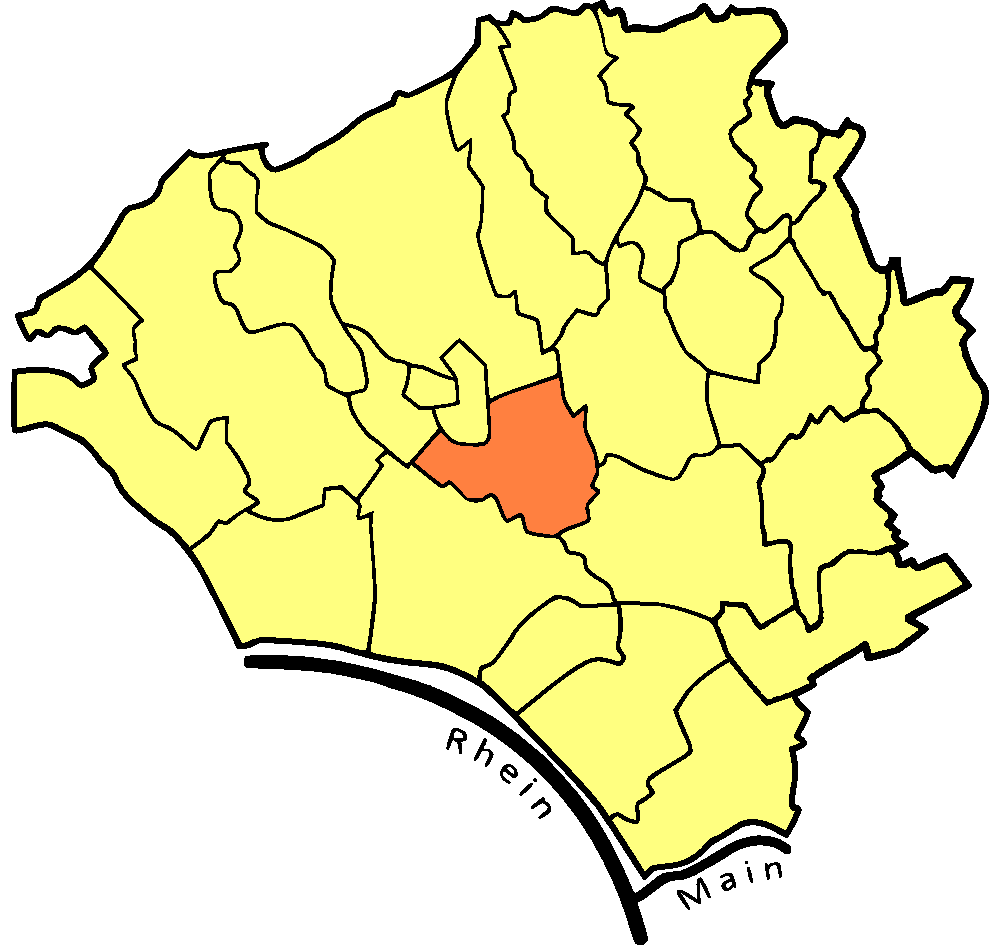
- Location of Nordost in Wiesbaden
- Interactive map of Südost
- Location within Germany Location within Hesse
- Coordinates: 50°04′01″N 8°14′59″E
- Country: Germany
- State: Hesse
- District: Urban district
- City: Wiesbaden

Government
  - Mayor: Alexander Scholz (Greens)

Area
  - Total: 6.62 km^{2} (2.56 sq mi)

Population (2020-12-31)
  - Total: 21,233
  - Density: 3,210/km^{2} (8,310/sq mi)
- Time zone: UTC+01:00 (CET)
  - Summer (DST): UTC+02:00 (CEST)
- Postal codes: 65185, 65187, 65189, 65191
- Dialling codes: 0611

Südost is a borough of the city of Wiesbaden, Hesse, Germany. With over 21,000 inhabitants, it is one of the most-populated of Wiesbaden's boroughs. It is located in the centre of the city.

== Sources ==
- Derived from German Wikipedia
