= Mainzer Straße (Wiesbaden) =

Thoroughfare in Wiesbaden, Germany

Coordinates: 50.0656°N 8.2508°E

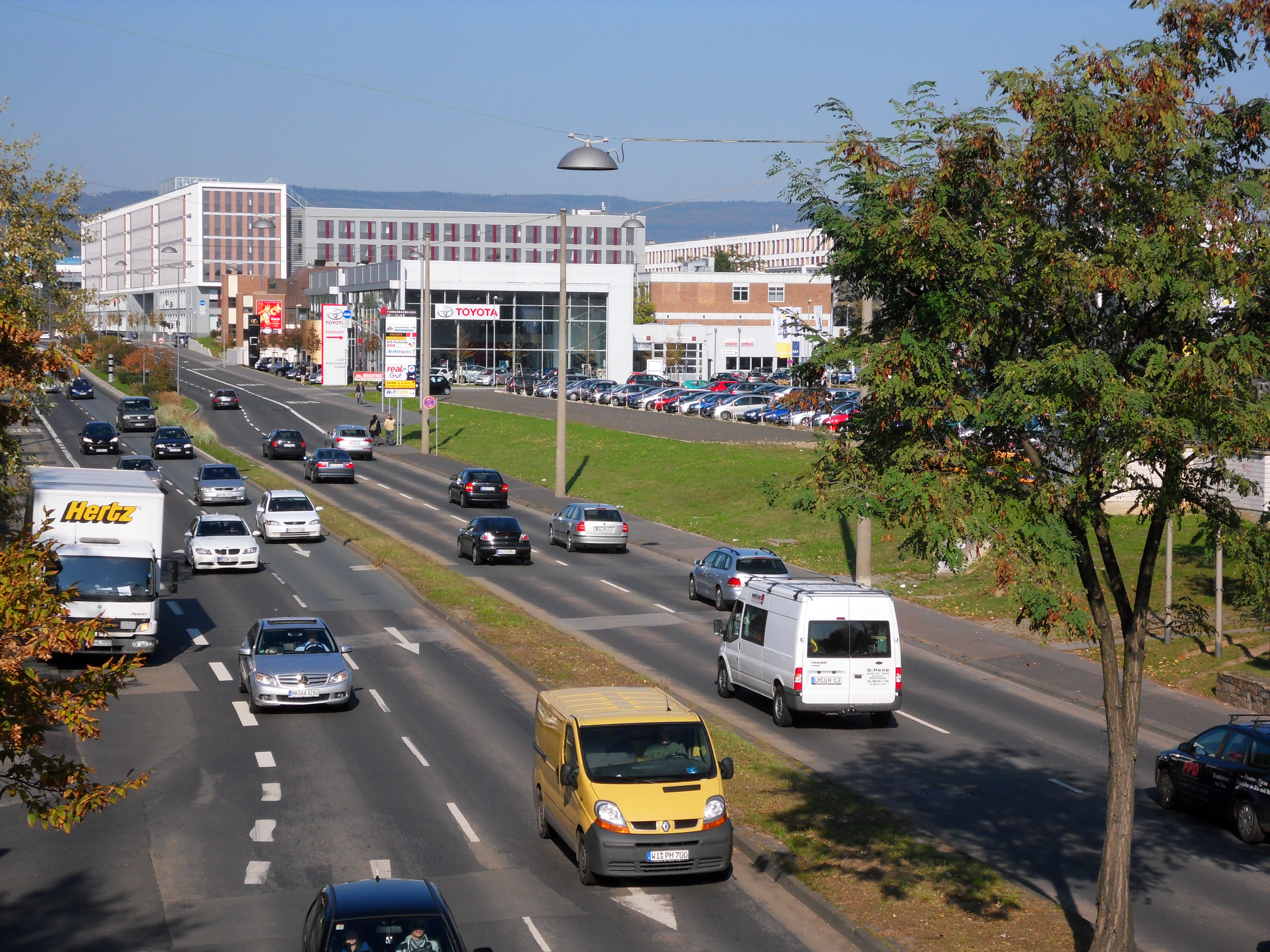
Mainzer Straße near central station

Mainzer Straße is a major arterial road in Wiesbaden, Germany, running from Ringroad near central station at the north end, south towards as continuation of Bundesautobahn 671 through the suburb of Südost. The Mainzer Straße is a four lane street and part of Bundesstraße 263. The street is with the Schiersteiner Straße and Ringstraße the busiest southern arterial road in Wiesbaden and is in the peak-hour traffic often congested.

The street was named according to their primary direction to Mainz-Kastel, a former district of the city of Mainz. Since the allied-occupation of Germany the district is administered by the city of Wiesbaden.
