= House of Nassau =

European aristocratic dynasty

- Arms of the House of Nassau; Azure billetty or, a lion rampant of the last armed and langued gules
- Country: Germany, Netherlands, Belgium, France, England, Scotland, Ireland, Luxembourg, Nassau, Orange
- Founded: c. 1093; 933 years ago
- Founder: Dudo of Laurenburg
- Current head: Guillaume V, Grand Duke of Luxembourg (in cognatic line)
- Final ruler: Charlotte, Grand Duchess of Luxembourg (in agnatic line)
- Titles: King of the Romans; King of the Netherlands; King of England, Scotland and Ireland; Grand Duke of Luxembourg; Duke of Nassau; Duke of Limburg; Prince of Orange; Prince of Orange-Nassau; Prince of Nassau-Orange-Fulda; Prince of Nassau-Usingen; Prince and Count of Nassau-Weilburg; Prince and Count of Nassau-Dietz; Prince and Count of Nassau-Siegen; Prince and Count of Nassau-Hadamar; Count of Nassau; Count of Laurenburg; Count of Nassau-Dillenburg; Count of Nassau-Wiesbaden-Idstein; Count of Nassau-Saarbrücken; Stadtholder in the Netherlands
- Estate: Nassau Castle
- Dissolution: 1985; 41 years ago (in agnatic line after death of Grand Duchess Charlotte)
- Cadet branches: Nassau-Weilburg; Orange-Nassau; Nassau-Corroy (illegitimate)

The House of Nassau is a European aristocratic dynasty. The name originated with a lordship associated with Nassau Castle, which is located in what is now Nassau in Rhineland-Palatinate, Germany. With the fall of the Hohenstaufen dynasty in the first half of the 13th century, royal power within Franconia evaporated and the former stem duchy fragmented into separate independent states. Nassau emerged as one of those independent states as part of the Holy Roman Empire. The lords of Nassau were originally titled "Counts of Nassau", subject only to the Emperor, and then elevated to princely rank as "Princely Counts". Early on, the family divided into two main branches – the elder (Walramian) branch, which gave rise to the German king Adolf, and the younger (Ottonian) branch, which gave rise to the Princes of Orange and the monarchs of the Netherlands.

At the end of the Holy Roman Empire and the Napoleonic Wars, the Walramian branch had inherited or acquired all the Nassau ancestral lands and proclaimed themselves, with the permission of the Congress of Vienna, the "Dukes of Nassau", forming the independent state of Nassau (with its capital at Wiesbaden). This territory now mainly lies in the German Federal State of Hesse, and partially in the neighbouring State of Rhineland-Palatinate. The Duchy was annexed by Prussia in 1866 after the Austrian-Prussian War as an ally of Austria. It was subsequently incorporated into the newly created Prussian Province of Hesse-Nassau.

Today, the term Nassau is used in Germany as a name for a geographical, historical and cultural region, but no longer has any political meaning. All Dutch and Luxembourgish monarchs since 1815 have been senior members of the House of Nassau. However, in 1890 in the Netherlands and in 1912 in Luxembourg, the male lines of heirs to the two thrones became extinct, so that since then, they have descended in the female line from the House of Nassau.

According to German tradition, the family name is passed on only in the male line of succession. The House would therefore, from this German perspective, have been extinct since 1985. However, both Dutch and Luxembourgish monarchial traditions, constitutional rules and legislation in that matter differ from the German tradition, and thus neither country considers the House extinct. The Grand Duke of Luxembourg uses "Duke of Nassau" as his secondary title and a title of pretense to the dignity of Chief of the House of Nassau (being the most senior member of the eldest branch of the House), but not to lay any territorial claims to the former Duchy of Nassau (which is now part of the Federal Republic of Germany).

== Origins ==
The area that came to be the county of Nassau was part of the Duchy of Franconia. When Franconia fragmented in the early 13th century with the fall of the Hohenstaufen dynasty, Nassau emerged as an independent state as part of the Holy Roman Empire.

Count Dudo-Henry of Laurenburg (c. 1060 – c. 1123) (German: Dudo von Laurenburg; Latin: Tuto de Lurinburg) is considered the founder of the House of Nassau. Dudo was a son of Rupert (German: Ruprecht), the Archbishop of Mainz's Vogt in Siegerland. Dudo was himself lord or Vogt of Lipporn and Miehlen and owned large parts of the lands of Lipporn/Laurenburg. There are more persons known who, as owners of the lands of Lipporn/Laurenburg (and thus the predecessors of Dudo), probably also were his ancestors. The first is a certain Drutwin mentioned in 881 as a landowner in Prüm, and who is the oldest known possible ancestor of the House of Nassau.

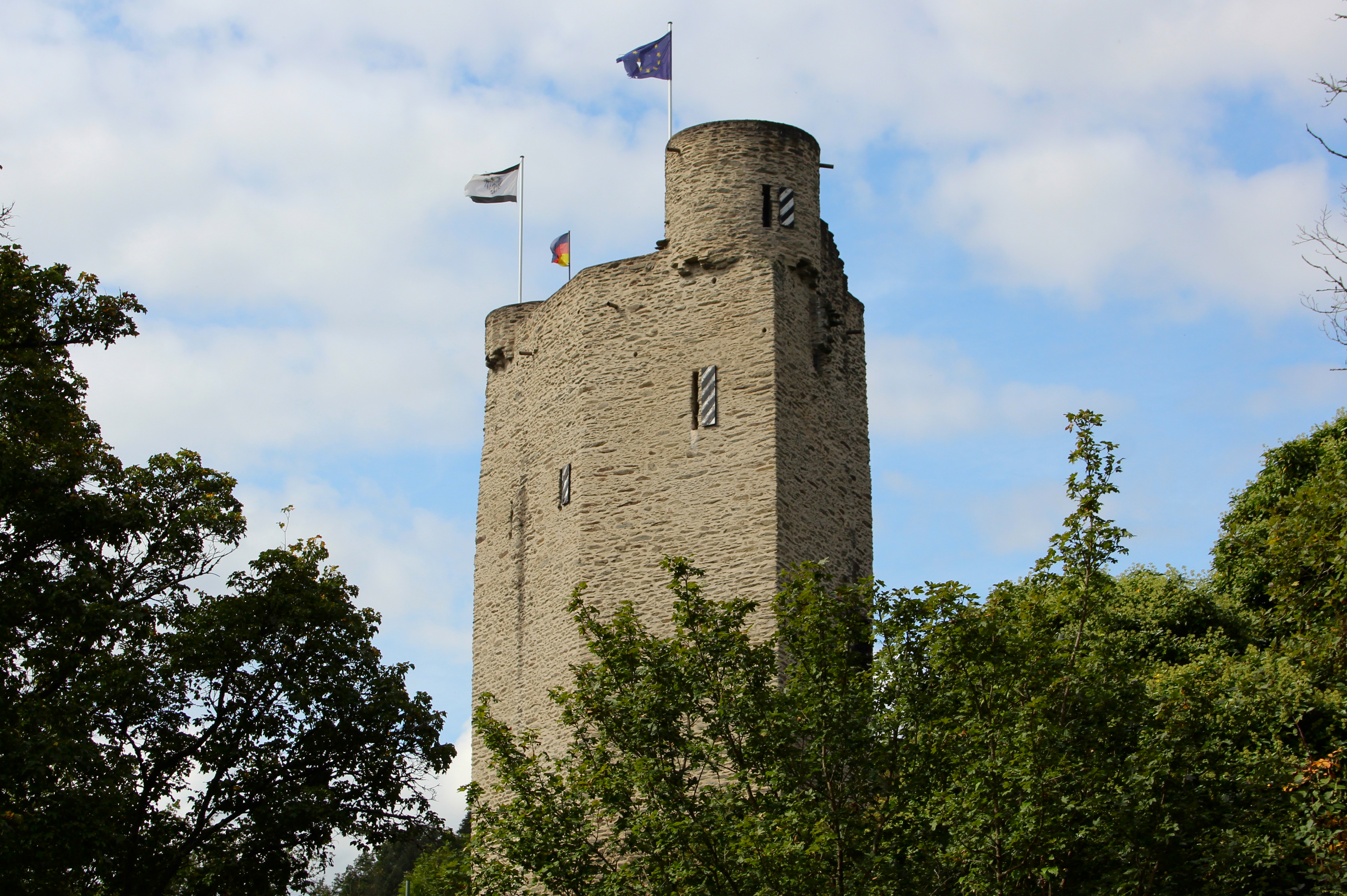
Laurenburg Castle

Dudo is mentioned as Tuto de Lurinburg between 1093 and 1117. Dudo built the castle of Laurenburg on the Lahn a few kilometers upriver from Nassau around 1090 as the seat of his lordship. He is first mentioned in a document in the purported founding-charter of Maria Laach Abbey in 1093 (although many historians consider the document to be fabricated). In 1159, Nassau Castle became the ruling seat, and the house is now named after this castle. In a charter dated 1134 (after his death) he is mentioned as Count of Laurenburg.

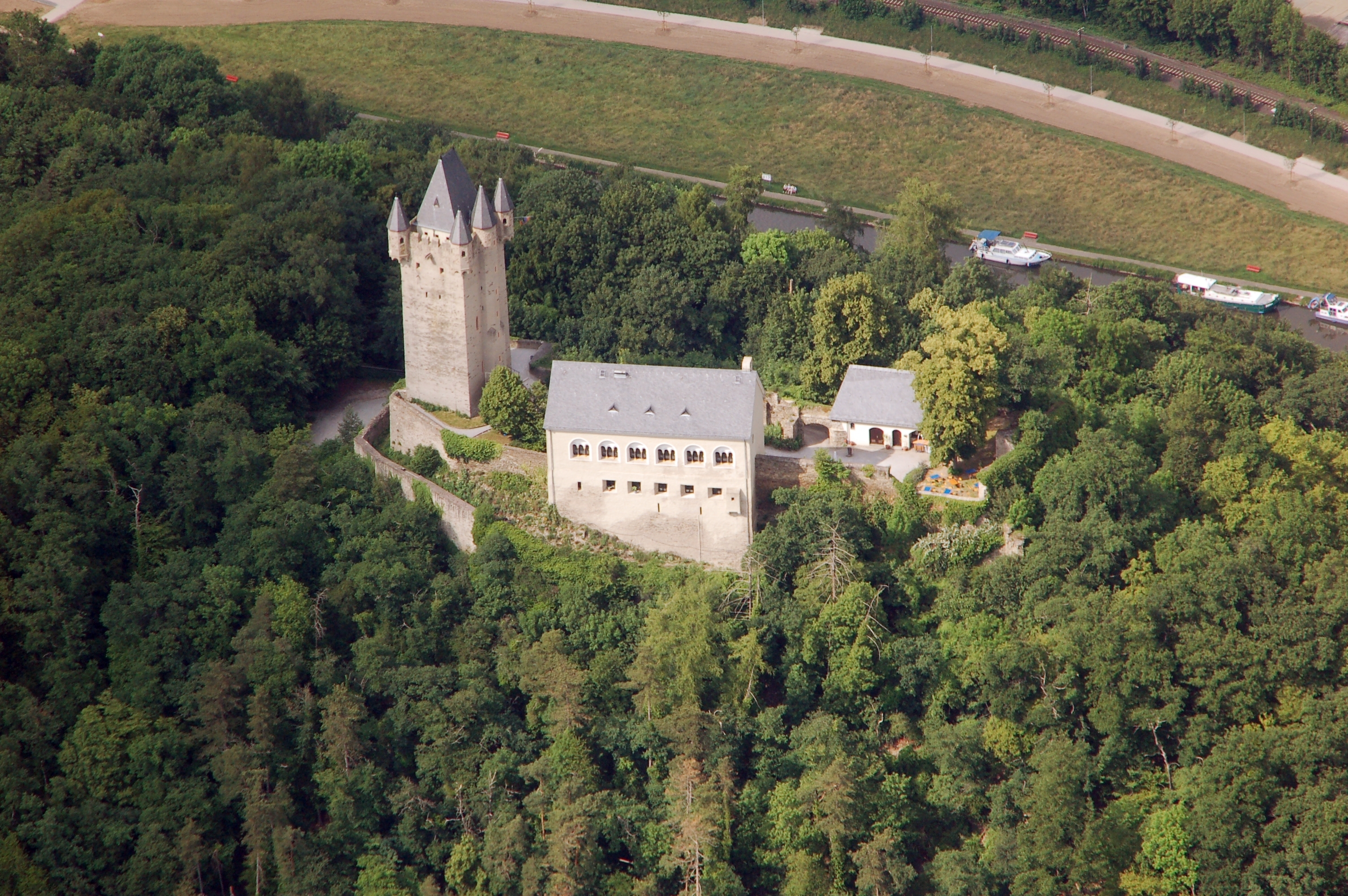
Nassau Castle became the seat of dynasty in 1159.

In 1117, Dudo donated land to Schaffhausen Abbey for construction of a monastery in Lipporn. Around 1117, Dudo, Count of Laurenburg founded at Lipporn a Benedictine priory dedicated and named for Saint Florin of Koblenz, and dependent on the Benedictine All Saints Abbey in Schaffhausen. About 1126, his son, Rupert I, Count of Laurenburg, the Vogt of Lipporn, established it as a separate and independent abbey. The Romanesque buildings were constructed between 1126 and 1145, presumably with a three-nave basilica. The abbey included both a monastery for monks and a small, separate one for nuns.

In 1122, Dudo received the castle of Idstein in the Taunus as a fief under the Archbishopric of Mainz. This was part of the inheritance of Count Udalrich of Idstein-Eppstein. He also received the Vogtship of the richly endowed Benedictine Bleidenstadt Abbey (in present-day Taunusstein).

The Counts of Laurenburg and Nassau expanded their authority under the brothers Robert (Ruprecht) I (1123–1154) and Arnold I of Laurenburg (1123–1148). Robert was the first person to call himself Count of Nassau, but the title was not confirmed until 1159, five years after Robert's death. Robert's son Walram I (1154–1198) was the first person to be legally titled Count of Nassau.

The chronology of the Counts of Laurenburg is not certain and the link between Robert I and Walram I is especially controversial. Also, some sources consider Gerhard, listed as co-Count of Laurenburg in 1148, to be the son of Robert I's brother, Arnold I. However, Erich Brandenburg in his Die Nachkommen Karls des Großen states that it is most likely that Gerhard was Robert I's son, because Gerard was the name of Beatrix of Limburg's maternal grandfather.

== Geography ==
As noted above, the county of Nassau was part of the stem Duchy of Franconia. It branched off northeast from the Rhine River and followed the course of the Lahn and Sieg rivers. Northeast and southeast of it was the lands of the House of Hesse. With the fall of the Hohenstaufen in the first half of the 13th century royal power within Franconia evaporated and the former stem duchy fragmented into separate independent states. Nassau emerged as one of those independent states as part of the Holy Roman Empire.

Nassau, originally a county, but part of the duchy of Franconia, developed on the lower Lahn river in what is known today as Rhineland-Palatinate. The town of Nassau was founded in 915. As noted above, Dudo of Laurenburg held Nassau as a fiefdom as granted by the Bishopric of Worms. His son, Rupert, built the Nassau Castle there around 1125, declaring himself "Count of Nassau". This title was not officially acknowledged by the Bishop of Worms until 1159 under the rule of Rupert's son, Walram. By 1159, the County of Nassau effectively claimed rights of taxation, toll collection, and justice, at which point it can be considered to become a state.

The Nassauers held the territory between the Taunus and the Westerwald at the lower and middle Lahn. By 1128, they acquired the bailiwick of the Bishopric of Worms, which had numerous rights in the area, and thus created a link between their heritage at the lower Lahn and their possessions near Siegen. In the middle of the 12th century, this relationship was strengthened by the acquisition of parts of the Hesse-Thüringen feudal kingdom, namely the Herborner Mark, the Kalenberger Zent and the Court of Heimau (Löhnberg). Closely linked to this was the "Lordship of Westerwald", also in Nassau's possession at the time. At the end of the 12th century, the House acquired the Reichshof Wiesbaden, an important base in the southwest.

In 1255, after the Counts of Nassau acquired the estates of Weilburg, the sons of Count Henry II divided Nassau for the first time. Walram II received the county of Nassau-Weilburg. From 1328 on, his younger brother, Otto I, held the estates north of the Lahn river, namely the County of Nassau-Siegen and Nassau-Dillenburg. The boundary line was essentially the Lahn, with Otto receiving the northern part of the county with the cities of Siegen, Dillenburg, Herborn and Haiger and Walram retaining the section south of the river, including the cities of Weilburg and Idstein.

Nassau (light yellow) within the Holy Roman Empire during the rule of the Staufers

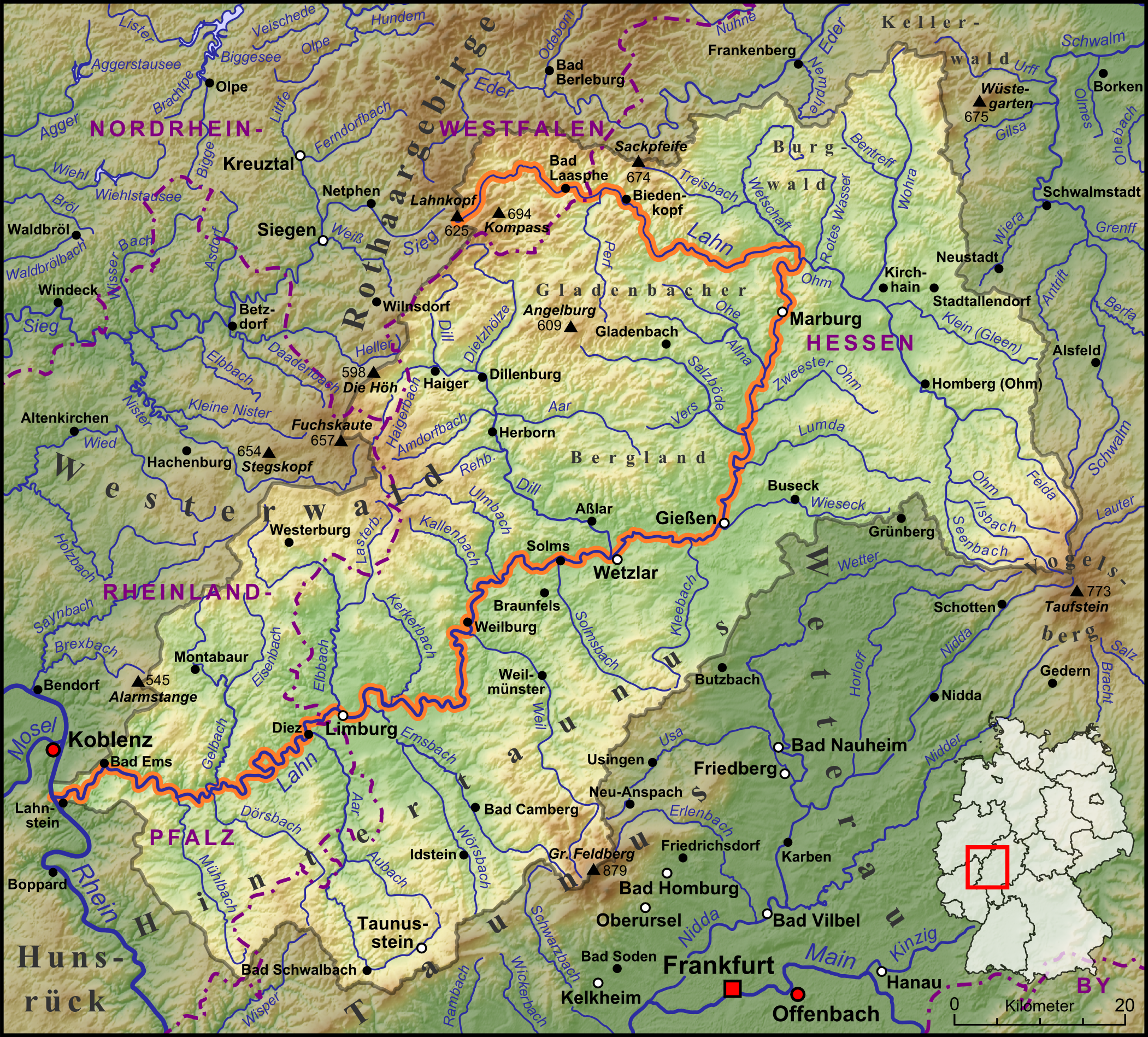
Course of the Lahn River through Nassau and Hesse.

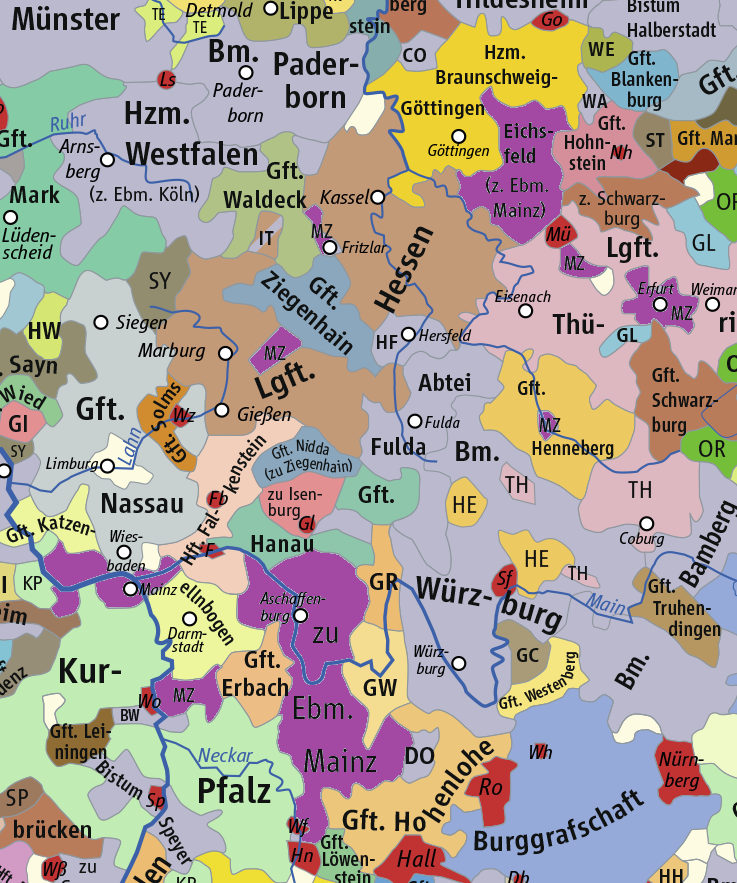
County of Nassau (grey) within the Holy Roman Empire in 1400 A.D.

== List of rulers ==
=== Counts of Laurenburg (ca. 1093–1159) and Nassau (1159–1255) ===
In 1255, Henry II's sons, Walram II and Otto I, split the Nassau possessions. The descendants of Walram became known as the Walram Line, which became important in the Countship of Nassau and Luxembourg. The descendants of Otto became known as the Ottonian Line, which would inherit parts of Nassau, France and the Netherlands. Both lines would often themselves be divided over the next few centuries. In 1783, the heads of various branches of the House of Nassau sealed the Nassau Family Pact (Erbverein) to regulate future succession in their states, and to establish a dynastic hierarchy whereby the Prince of Orange-Nassau-Dietz was recognised as President of the House of Nassau.

=== The Walramian Line (1255–1985) ===
Arms with crest and motto

Walramian Nassau arms with crowned lion

Crowned Lion arms and crest of the Walram line now seen in the coat of arms of Luxembourg: "d'azur, semé de billettes d'or, au lion couronné du second, armé, lampassé de gueules.'"

The Walramian Line concentrated their efforts primarily on their German lands. The exception was Adolf, King of the Romans (c. 1255 – 2 July 1298) who was the count of Nassau from about 1276 and the elected king of Germany from 1292 until his deposition by the prince-electors in 1298. He was never crowned by the pope, which would have secured him the imperial title. He was the first physically and mentally healthy ruler of the Holy Roman Empire ever to be deposed without a papal excommunication. Adolf died shortly afterwards in the Battle of Göllheim fighting against his successor Albert of Habsburg. He was the second in the succession of so-called count-kings of several rivalling comital houses striving after the Roman-German royal dignity after the expiration the Hohenstaufen. The Nassaus, however, were not on the imperial throne long enough to establish themselves in larger landholdings to increase their hereditary power such as the Luxemburgers did in Bohemia or the Habsburgs did in Austria.

After Gerlach's death, the possessions of the Walram line were divided into Nassau-Weilburg and Nassau-Wiesbaden-Idstein.

==== Nassau-Weilburg (1344–1816) ====
Flag of Nassau-Weilburg

Count Walram II began the Countship of Nassau in Weilburg (Nassau-Weilburg), which existed to 1816. The Walram line also received the lordship of Merenberg in 1328 and Saarbrücken (by marriage) in 1353. The sovereigns of this house afterwards ruled the Duchy of Nassau from its establishment in 1806 as part of the Confederation of the Rhine (jointly with Nassau-Usingen until 1816). The last reigning Duke, Adolph, became Duke of Nassau in August 1839, following the death of his father William. The Duchy was annexed to Prussia in 1866 after Austria's defeat in the Austro-Prussian War.

From 1815 to 1839, Grand Duchy of Luxembourg was ruled by the kings of the Netherlands as a province of the Netherlands. Following the Treaty of London (1839), the Grand Duchy of Luxembourg became independent but remained in personal union with the Netherlands. Following the death of his sons, the Dutch king William III had no male heirs to succeed him. In the Netherlands, females were allowed to succeed to the throne. Luxembourg, however, followed Salic law which barred females from succession. Thus, upon King William III's death, the crown of the Netherlands passed to his only daughter, Wilhelmina, while that of Luxembourg passed to Adolph in accordance with the Nassau Family Pact. Adolph died in 1905 and was succeeded by his son, William IV.

and from 1890 the Grand Duchy of Luxembourg. The branch of Nassau-Weilburg ultimately became rulers of Luxembourg.

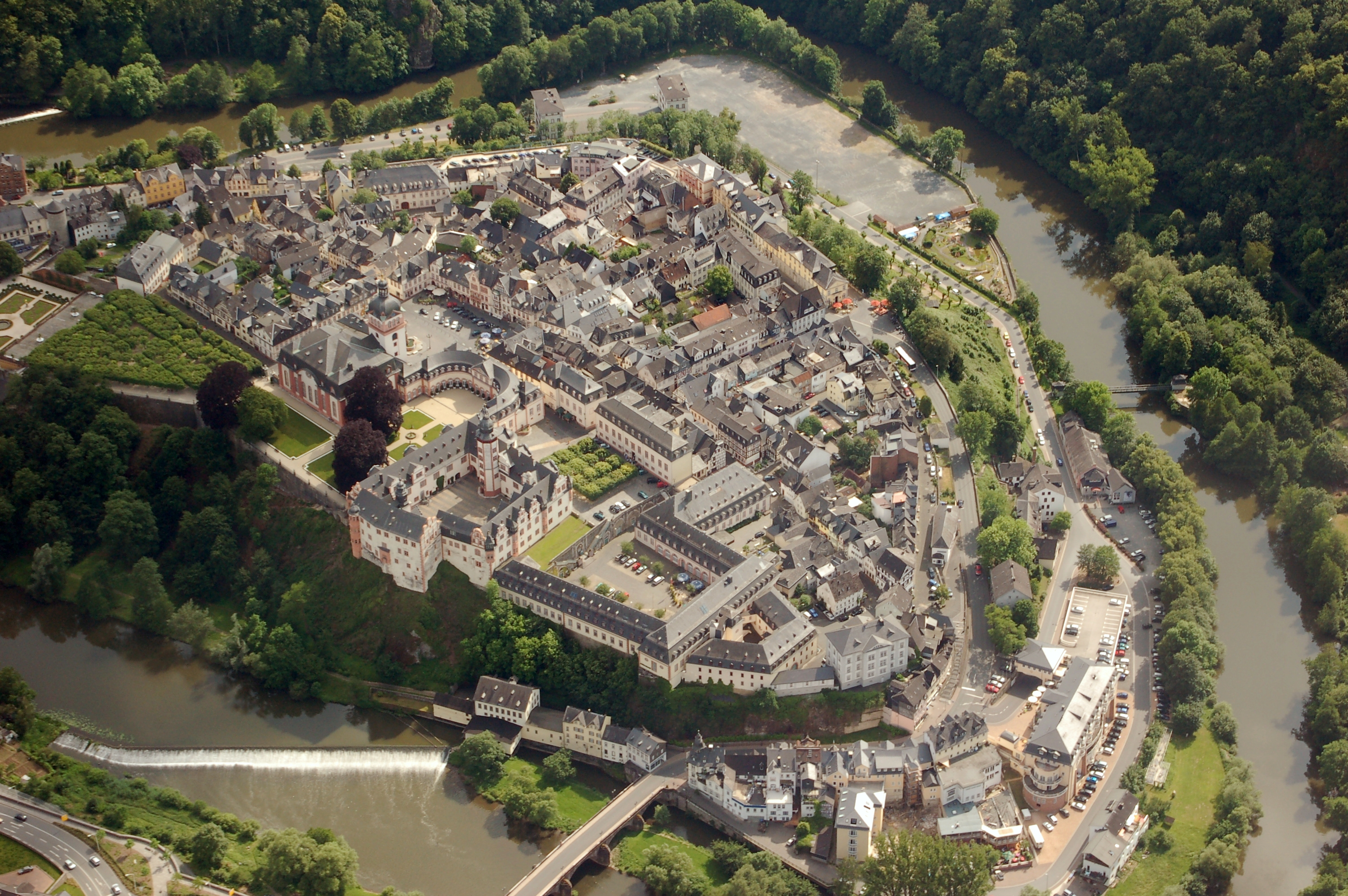
Weilburg

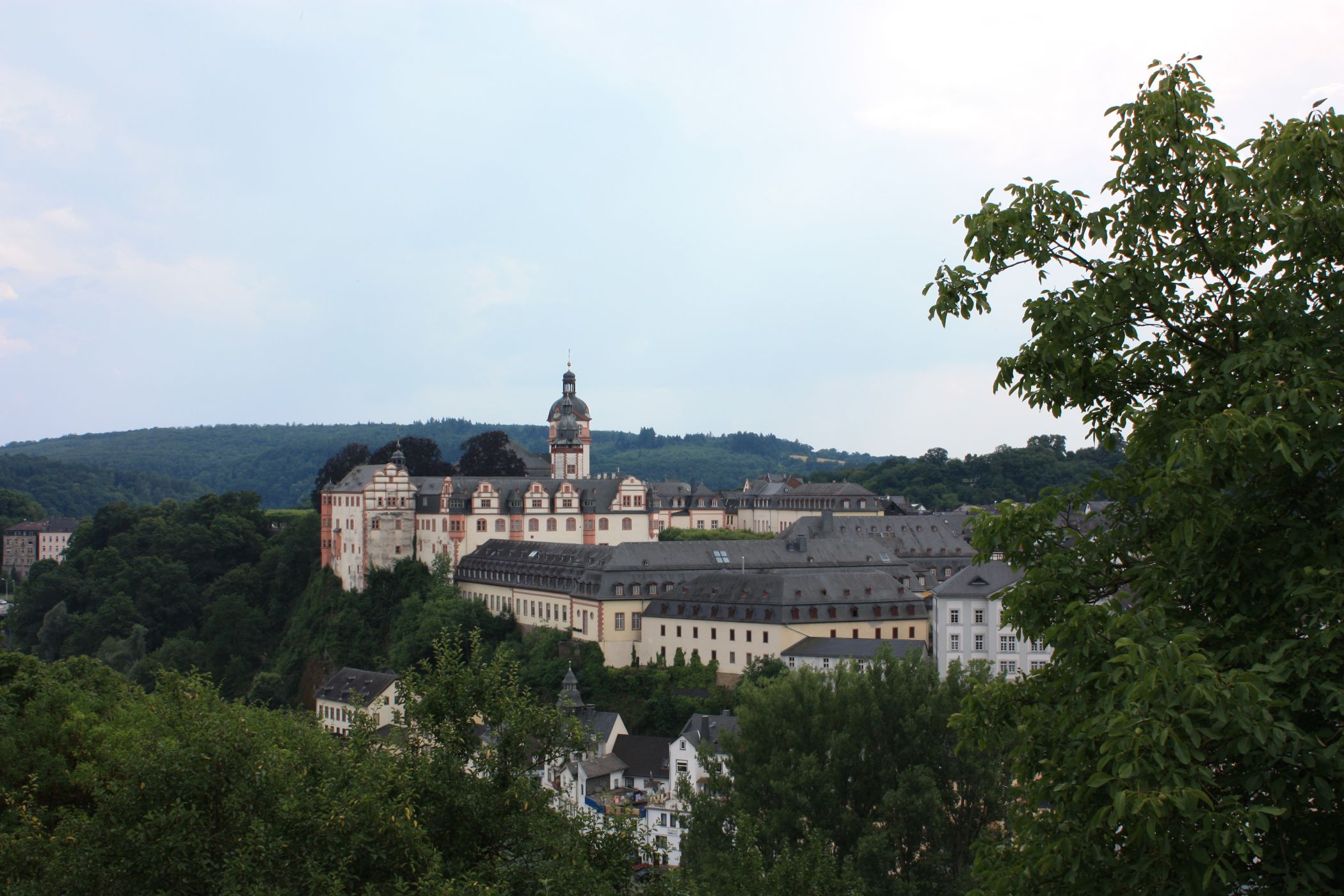
Weilburg Castle

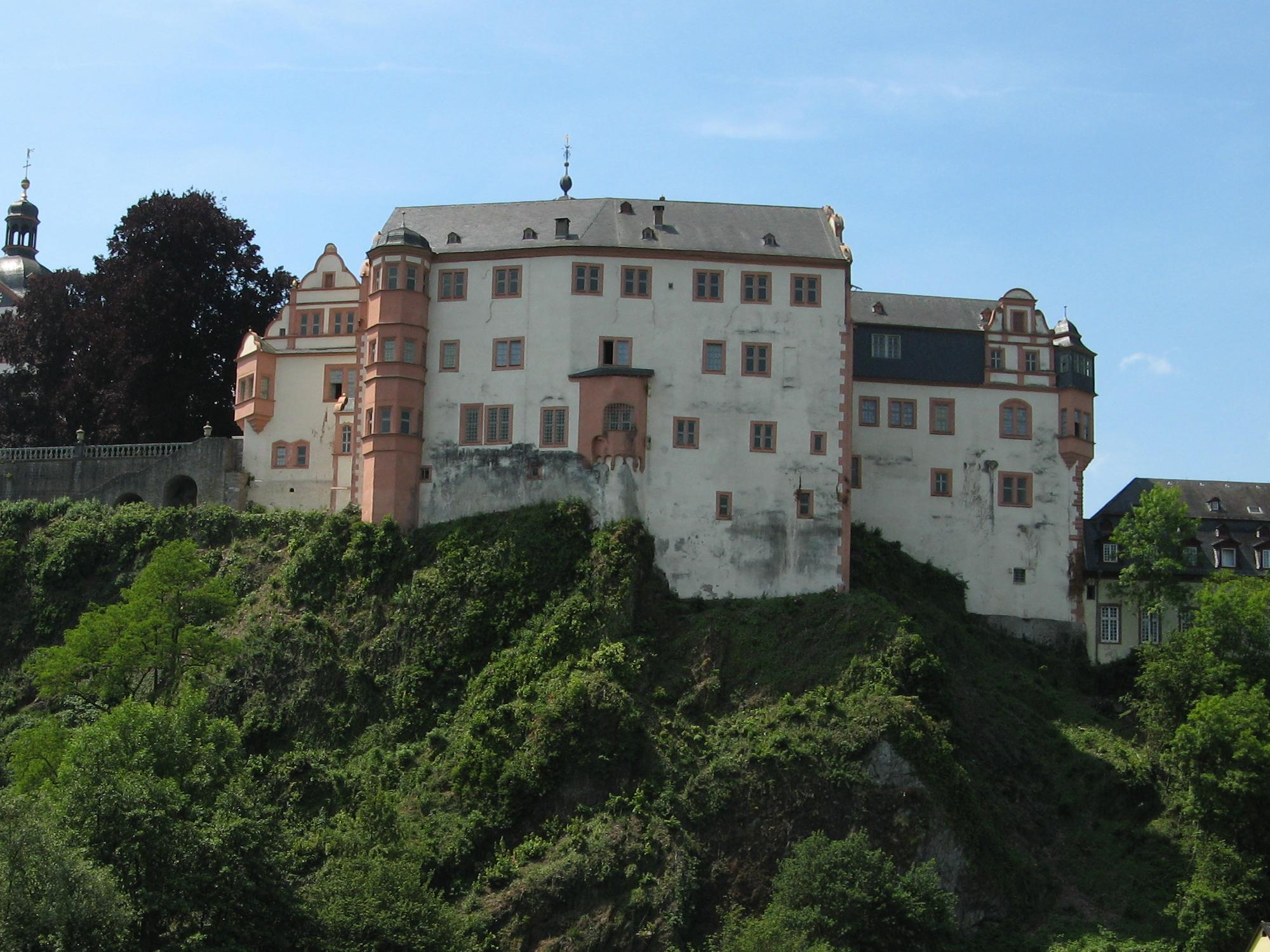
East wing of the castle

===== Counts of Nassau-Weilburg (1344–1688), Princely counts of Nassau-Weilburg (1688–1816) and Dukes of Nassau (1816–1866) =====
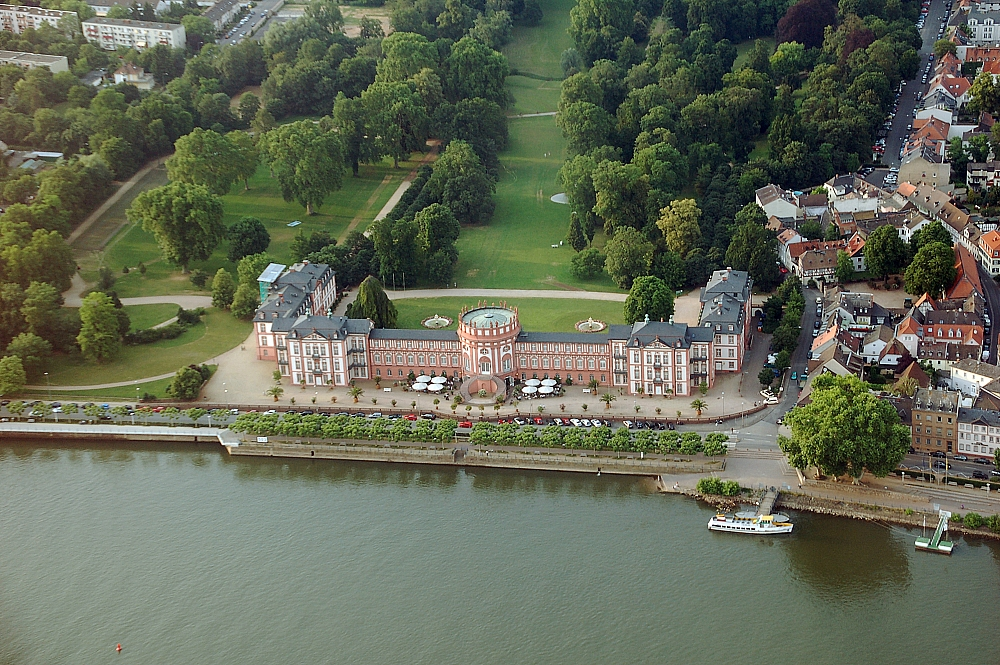
Biebrich Palace

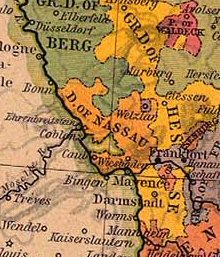
Duchy of Nassau in 1812 as part of the Confederation of the Rhine.

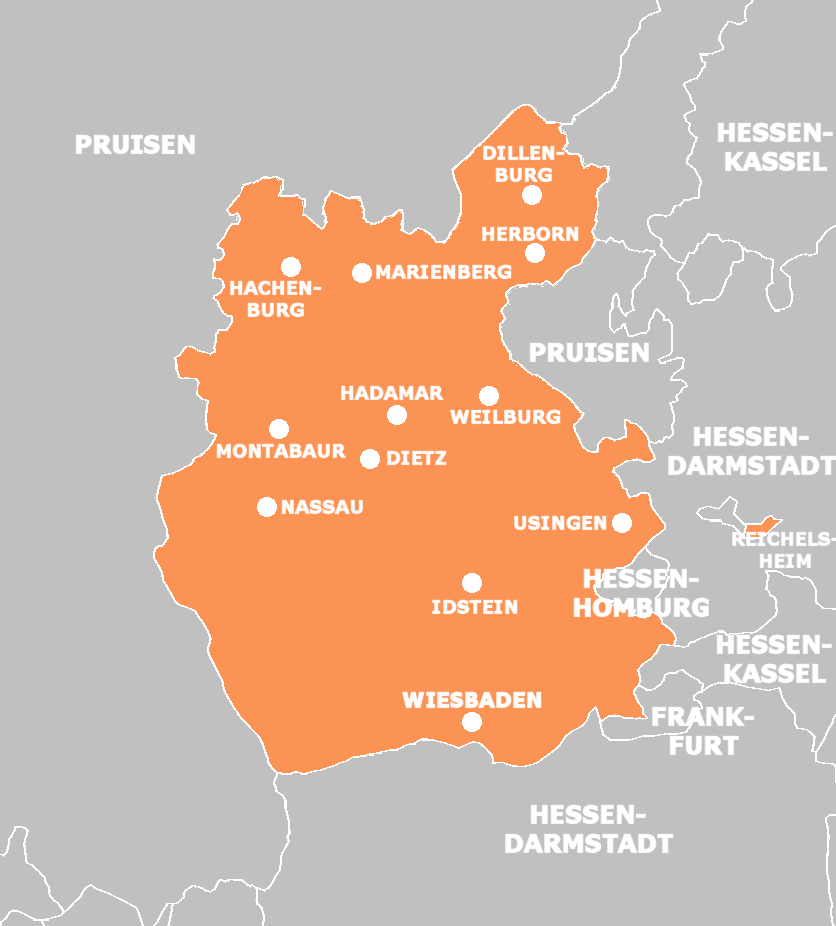
Duchy of Nassau in 1848.

===== Grand Dukes of Luxembourg (from the House of Nassau-Weilburg) – 1890–1912 and succession through a female onwards =====
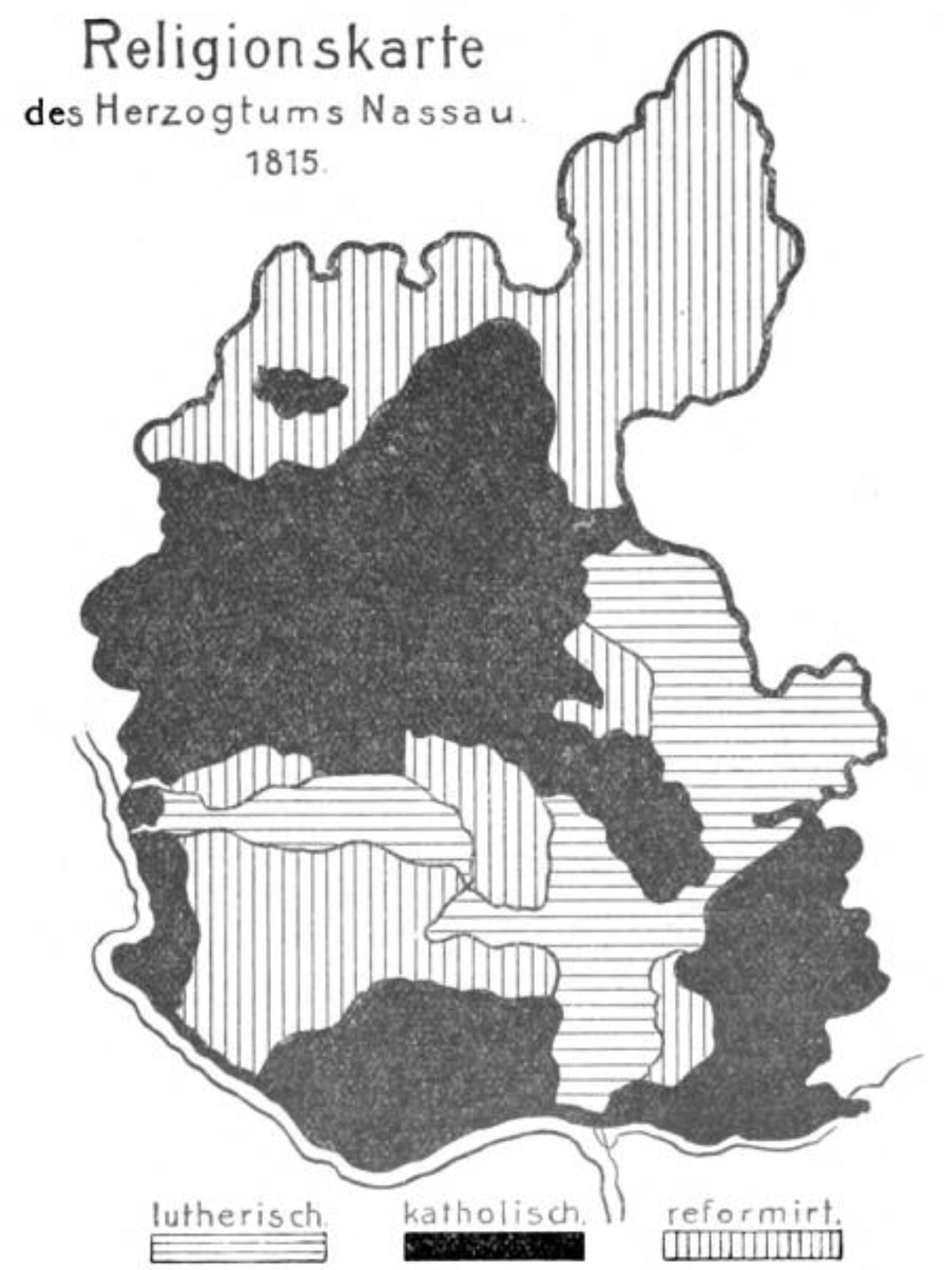
Religious Lines in the Duchy of Nassau

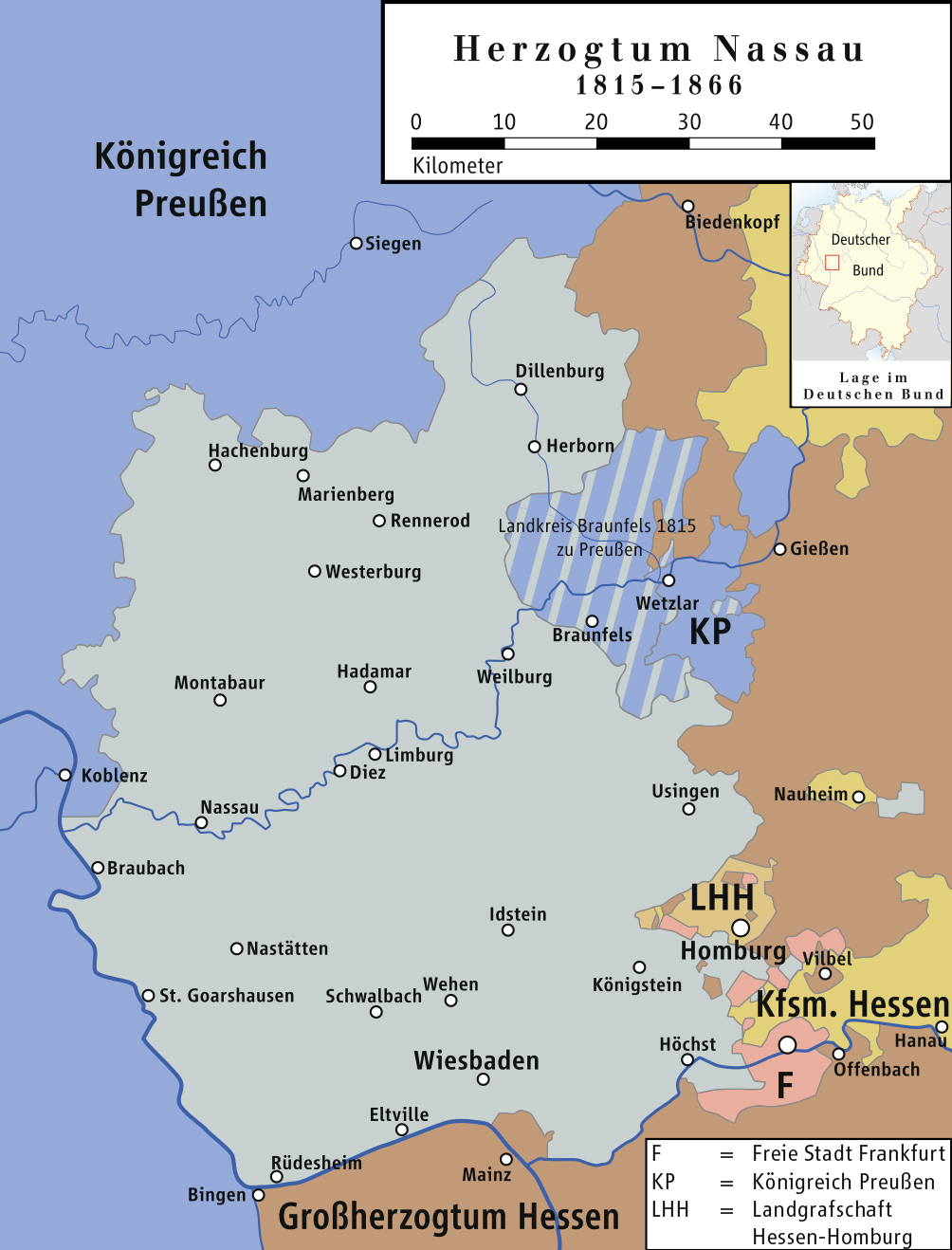
Duchy of Nassau after 1815

- 1890–1905: Adolphe
- 1905–1912: William IV
- 1912–1919: Marie-Adélaïde
- 1919–1964: Charlotte
- 1964–2000: Jean
- 2000–2025: Henri
- 2025–present: Guillaume V
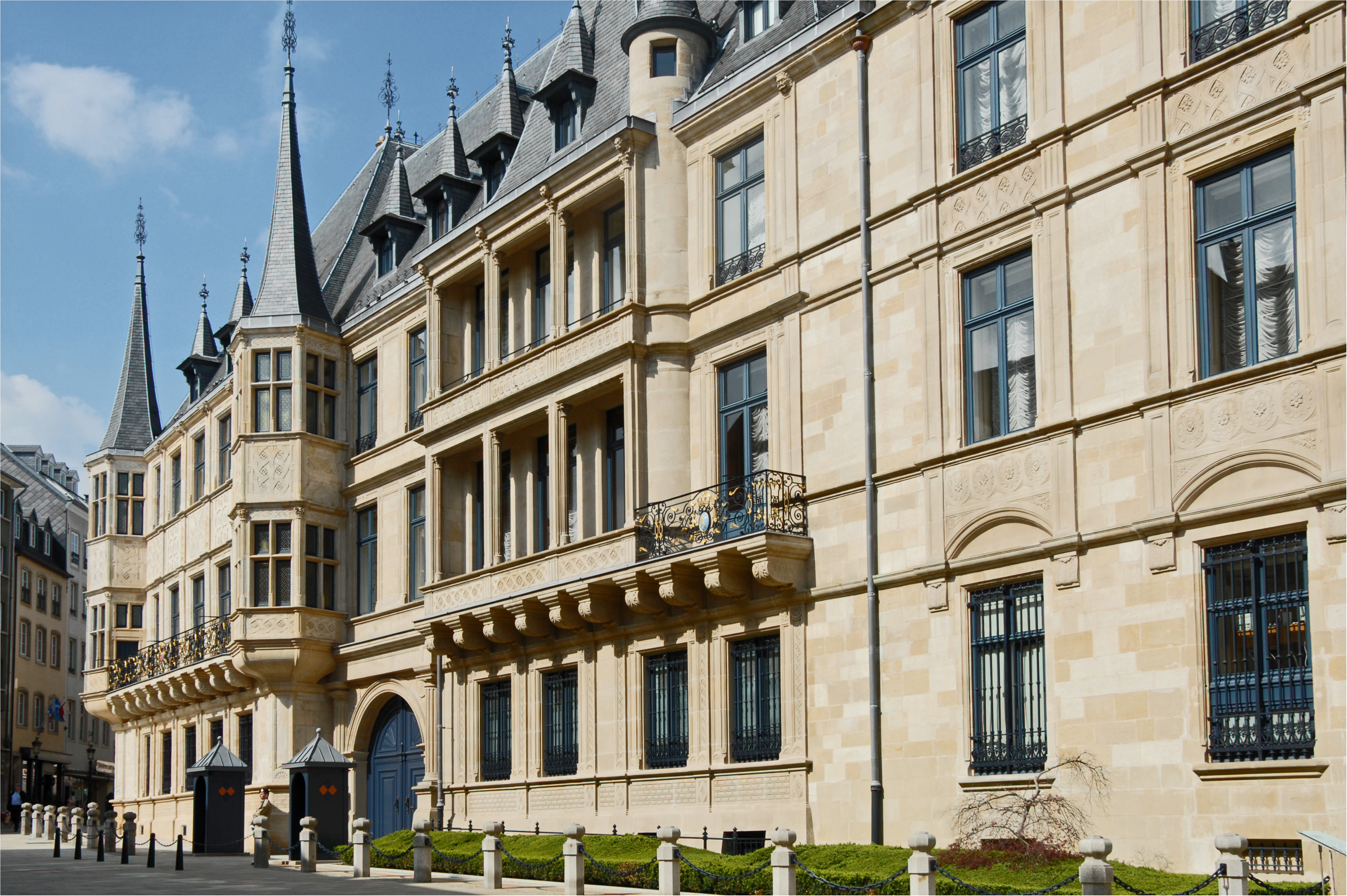
Grand Ducal Palace, Luxembourg

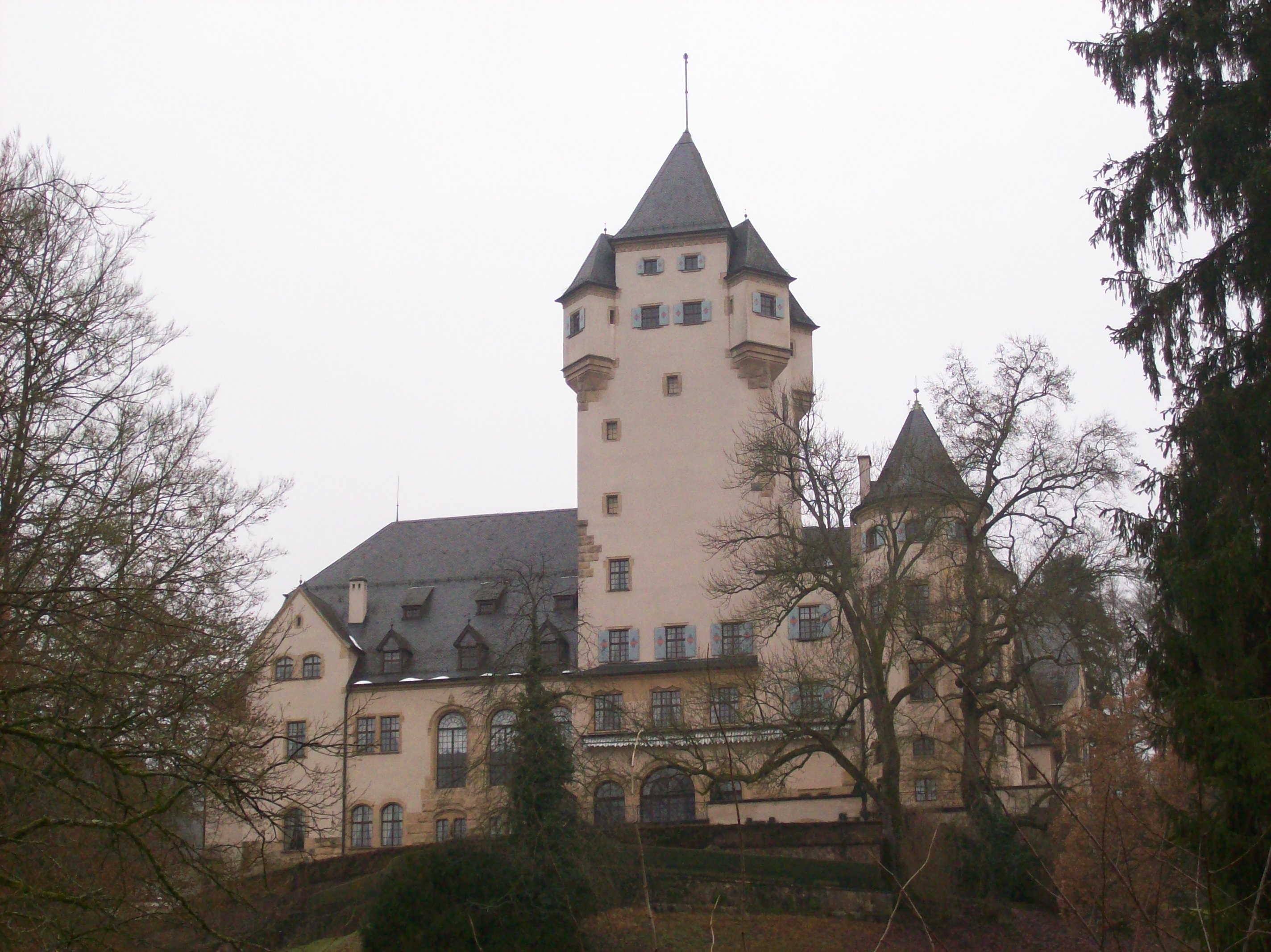
Berg Castle, Luxembourg

===== Counts of Merenberg =====
Count of Merenberg (German: Graf von Merenberg) is a hereditary title of nobility that was bestowed in 1868 by the reigning Prince of Waldeck and Pyrmont, George Victor, upon the morganatic wife and male-line descendants of Prince Nikolaus Wilhelm of Nassau (1832–1905), younger brother of Adolf, last Duke of Nassau/Grand Duke of Luxembourg. Nicholas married Natalia Alexandrovna Pushkina (1836–1913), former wife of Russian general Mikhail Leontievich von Dubelt.

In 1907 Grand Duke Adolph declared the family non-dynastic/morganatic. Had they not been excluded from the succession, they would have inherited the headship of the house in 1912. Georg Nickolaus would have thus become the reigning Grand Duke of Luxembourg.

In 1907, William IV, obtained passage of a law in Luxembourg confirming the exclusion of the Merenbergs from succession to the grand ducal throne. Georg Nikolaus's protests against the Luxembourg Diet's confirmation of the succession rights of William IV's daughter, Princess Marie-Adélaïde, were expected to be taken up by the Netherlands and by the Great Powers which had guaranteed Luxembourg's neutrality in 1867. Nonetheless, Marie-Adélaïde did succeed her father, to become Luxembourg's first female monarch, in 1912. She, in turn, abdicated in favour of her sister Charlotte, whose descendants have reigned over Luxembourg since then. Georg Nikolaus died in 1948. His son Georg Michael Alexander was the last legitimate descendant of the House of Nassau. He died in 1965

==== Counts of Nassau-Wiesbaden-Idstein (1344–1728) ====
From the documentary mention in 1102 until 1721, Idstein was, with interruptions, residence of the Counts of Nassau-Idstein and other Nassau lines. One of the Counts was, as said above, Adolf of Germany, the Holy Roman Emperor from 1292 to 1298.

The Nassau Counts' holdings were subdivided many times among heirs, with the parts being brought together again whenever a line died out. This yielded an older Nassau-Idstein line from 1480 to 1509, later merging once again with Nassau-Wiesbaden and Nassau-Weilburg and, from 1629 to 1721, a newer Nassau-Idstein line.

In 1721, Idstein passed to Nassau-Ottweiler, and in 1728 to Nassau-Usingen, thereby losing its status as a residence town, although it became the seat of the Nassau Archives and of an Oberamt.

In the 1170s, the Count of Nassau, Walram I, received the area around Wiesbaden as a fiefdom. In 1232, Wiesbaden became a Reichsstadt, an imperial city, of the Holy Roman Empire. Wiesbaden returned to the control of the House of Nassau in 1270 under Count Walram II, Count of Nassau. However, Wiesbaden and the castle at Sonnenberg were again destroyed in 1283 in conflict with Eppstein.

Walram's son and successor Adolf was, as said above, king of Germany from 1292 until 1298. In 1329, under Adolf's son Gerlach I of Nassau-Weilburg the House of Nassau and thereby, Wiesbaden, received the right of coinage from Holy Roman Emperor Louis the Bavarian.

In 1355, the County of Nassau-Weilburg was divided among the sons of Gerlach. The County of Nassau's holdings would be subdivided many times among heirs, with the parts being brought together again whenever a line died out. Wiesbaden became the seat of the County of Nassau-Wiesbaden under Count Adolf I (1307–1370), eldest son of Gerlach. It eventually fell back to Nassau-Weilburg in 1605.

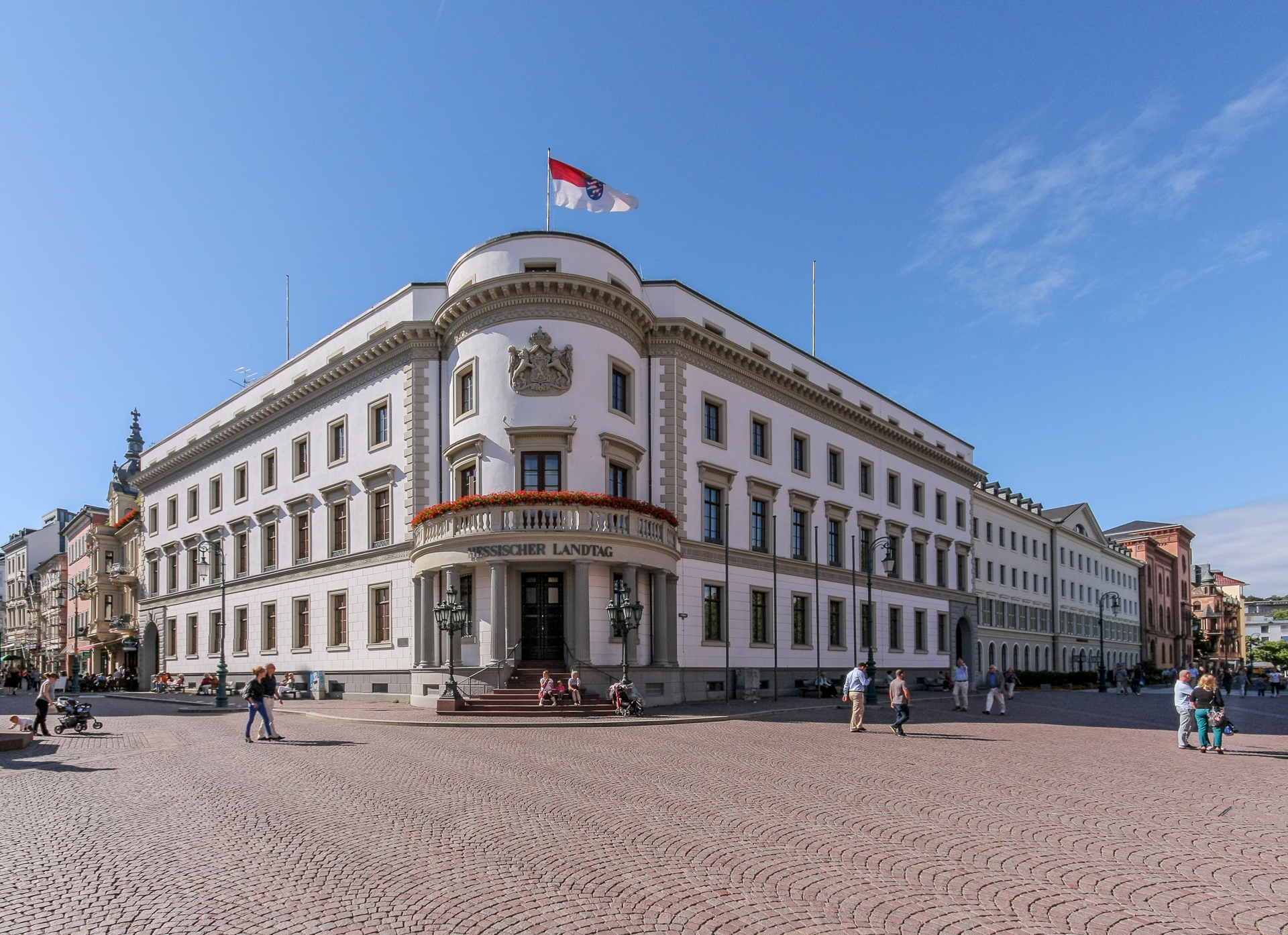
Wiesbaden City Palace

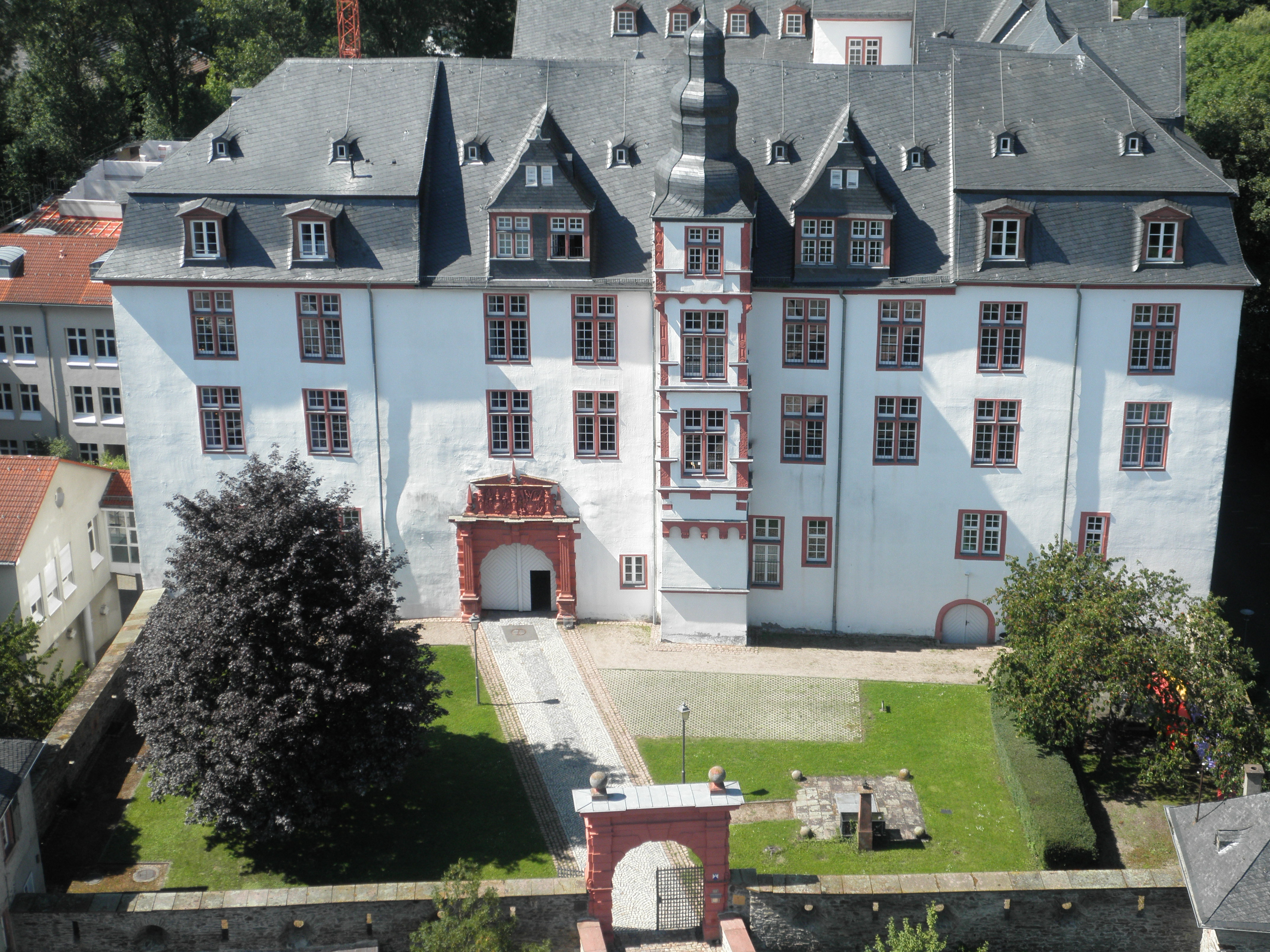
Idstein Castle

==== Counts of Nassau-Saarbrücken (1429–1797) ====
Philipp I ruled both Nassau-Saarbrücken and Nassau-Weilburg and in 1393 inherited through his wife Johanna of Hohenlohe the lordships Kirchheimbolanden and Stauf. He also received half of Nassau-Ottweiler in 1393 and other territories later during his reign. After his death in 1429 the territories around Saarbrücken and along the Lahn were kept united until 1442, when they were again divided among his sons into the lines Nassau-Saarbrücken (west of the Rhine) and Nassau-Weilburg (east of the Rhine), the so-called Younger line of Nassau-Weilburg.

In 1507, Count John Ludwig I significantly enlarged his territory. After his death in 1544 the county was split into three parts, the three lines (Ottweiler, Saarbrücken proper and Kirchheim) were all extinct in 1574 and all of Nassau-Saarbrücken was united with Nassau-Weilburg until 1629. This new division, however, was not executed until the Thirty Years' War was over and in 1651 three counties were established: Nassau-Idstein, Nassau-Weilburg and Nassau-Saarbrücken.

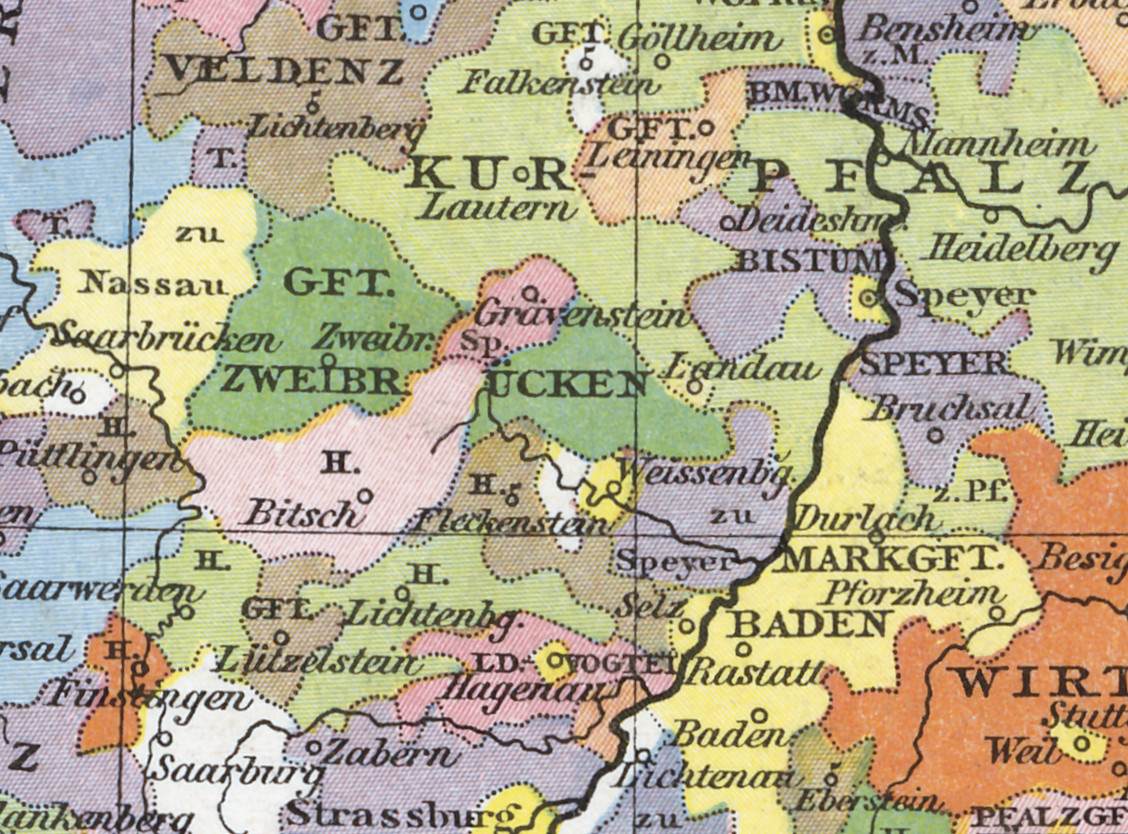
The county of Saarbrücken in the Rheinland in light yellow.

Only eight years later, Nassau-Saarbrücken was again divided into:

- Nassau-Saarbrücken proper, fell to Nassau-Ottweiler in 1723
- Nassau-Ottweiler, fell to Nassau-Usingen in 1728
- Nassau-Usingen

In 1735, Nassau-Usingen was divided again into Nassau-Usingen and Nassau-Saarbrücken. In 1797 Nassau-Usingen finally inherited Nassau-Saarbrücken, it was (re-)unified with Nassau-Weilburg and raised to the Duchy of Nassau in 1806. The first Duke of Nassau was Frederick August of Nassau-Usingen who died in 1816. Wilhelm, Prince of Nassau-Weilburg inherits the Duchy of Nassau. But, territories of Nassau Saarbrücken was occupied by France in 1793 and was annexed as Sarre department in 1797. Finally County of Nassau-Saarbrücken was part of Prussia in 1814.

After Henry Louis's death, Nassau-Saarbrücken fell to Charles William, Prince of Nassau-Usingen until Adolph came of age in 1805.

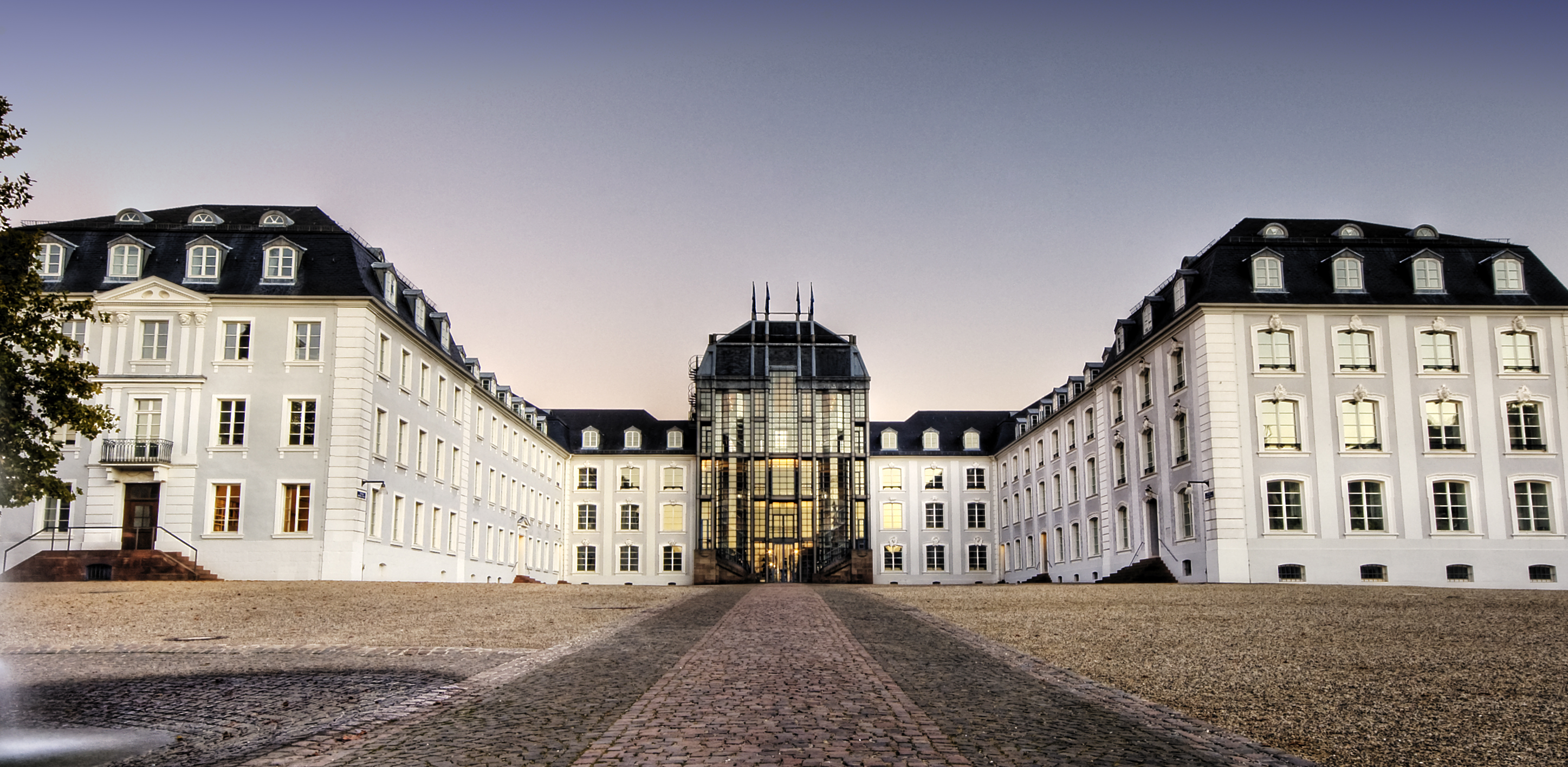
Saarbrücken Castle

==== Princes of Nassau-Usingen (1659–1816) ====
The origin of the county lies in the medieval county of Weilnau that was acquired by the counts of Nassau-Weilburg in 1602. That county was divided in 1629 into the lines of Nassau-Weilburg, Nassau-Idstein and Nassau-Saarbrücken that was divided only 30 years later in 1659. The emerging counties were Nassau-Saarbrücken, Nassau-Ottweiler and Nassau-Usingen. At the beginning of the 18th century, three of the Nassau lines died out and Nassau-Usingen became their successor (1721 Nassau-Idstein, 1723 Nassau-Ottweiler und 1728 Nassau-Saarbrücken). In 1735 Nassau-Usingen was divided again into Nassau-Usingen and Nassau-Saarbrücken. In 1797 Nassau-Usingen inherited Nassau-Saarbrücken. In 1816, Nassau-Usingen merged with Nassau-Weilburg to form the Duchy of Nassau. See "Dukes of Nassau" above.

Following Frederick Augustus' death, the princely title was adopted (in pretense) by his half brother through an unequal marriage, Karl Philip. As head of the House in 1907, Wilhelm IV declared the Count of Merenberg non-dynastic; by extension, this would indicate that (according to Luxembourgish laws regarding the House of Nassau) this branch would assume the Salic headship of the house in 1965, following the death of the last male Count of Merenberg.

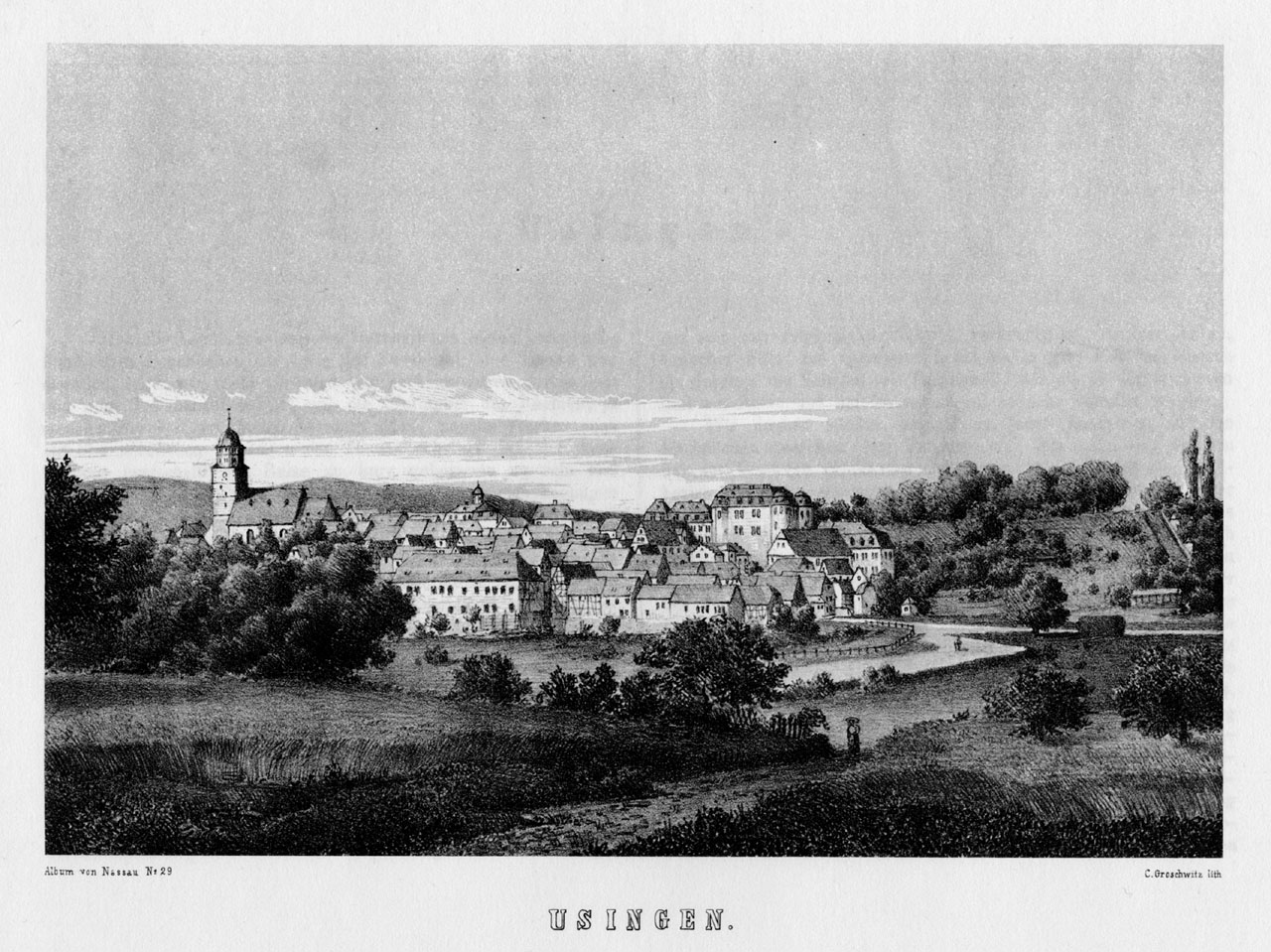
Usingen Castle

=== The Ottonian line ===
Arms with crest

Ottonian Nassau Arms

Arms and crest of the Ottonian line (since the 13th century) now part of the coat of arms of the Netherlands: "d'azur semé de billettes d'or, au lion du même, armé et lampassé de gueules, brochant sur le tout".

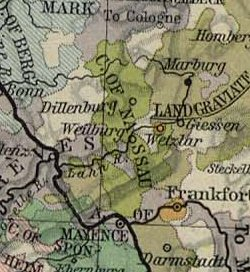
the County of Nassau (green) in 1547

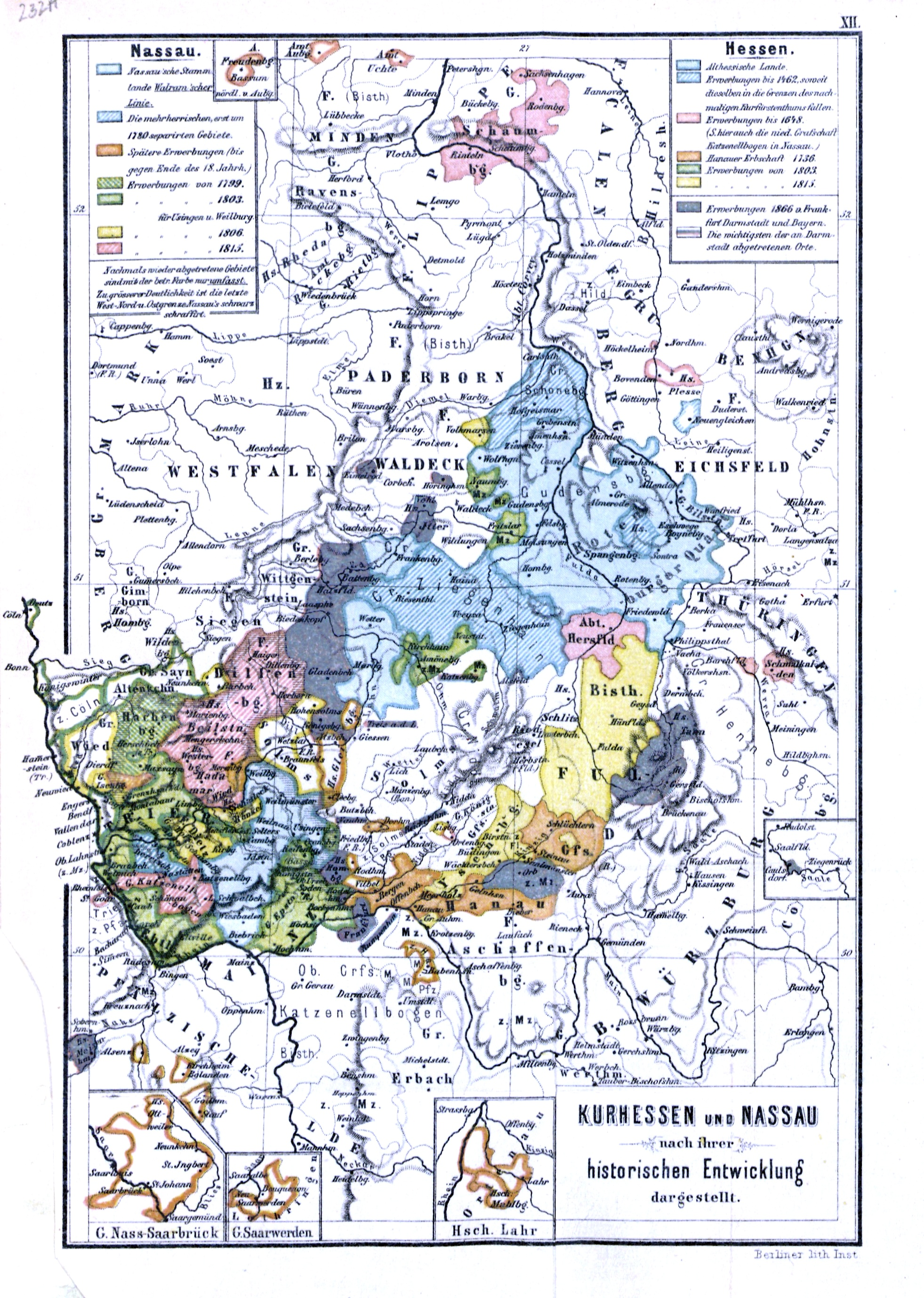
Electoral Hesse and the Nassau lands in the earl 19th century showing the multiple divisions based on family lines.

The partition of the county of Nassau between Otto, and his older brother Walram (above), resulted in a permanent division between the 2 branches of the family. The Walramian branch tended to concentrate on their German lands, while the Ottonians, as we will see below, established themselves in the Netherlands and became great magnates, leaders of the Dutch Revolt, the stadtholders of the Dutch Republican government, and eventual kings of the Netherlands. This, however, was not before many divisions and reunitings. The first was between sons of Otto, with the main power base being centered around the caste of Dillenburg:

- 1255–1290: Otto I, Count of Nassau in Siegen, Dillenburg, Beilstein, and Ginsberg
- 1290–1303: Joint rule by Henry, John and Emicho I, sons of Otto I

In 1303, Otto's sons divided the possessions of the Ottonian line. Henry received Nassau-Siegen, John received Nassau-Dillenburg and Emicho I received Nassau-Hadamar. After John's death. Nassau-Dillenburg fell to Henry.

==== Counts of Nassau-Dillenburg ====
The Ottonian portion of the county of Nassau was divided and sub-divided, as shown in the genealogical charts below, several times, so that each son of the previous count would have a portion. Eventually, these lines would all die out in favor of the main branch of the family, which had established themselves in The Netherlands.

Ottonian Nassau Fortresses

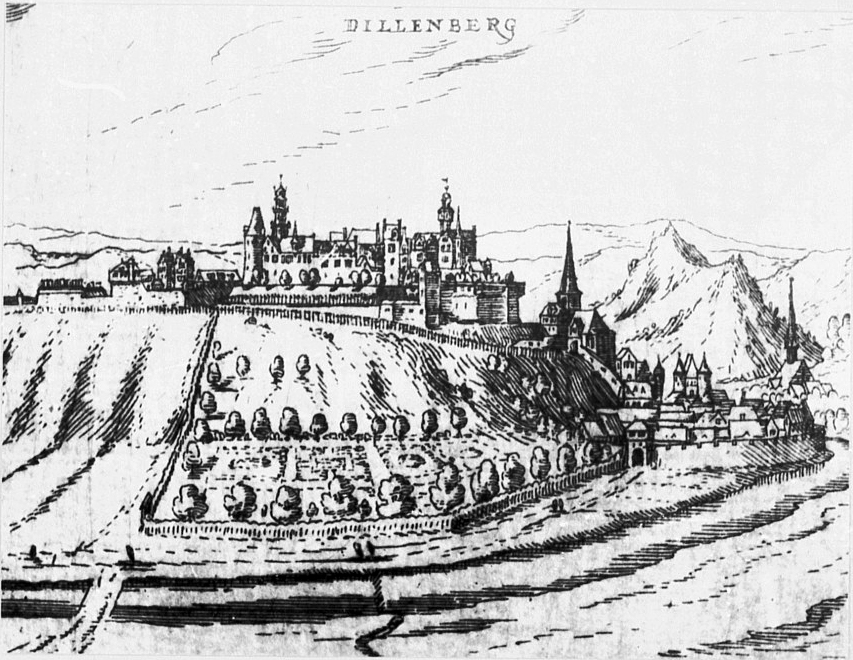
Dillenburg Castle

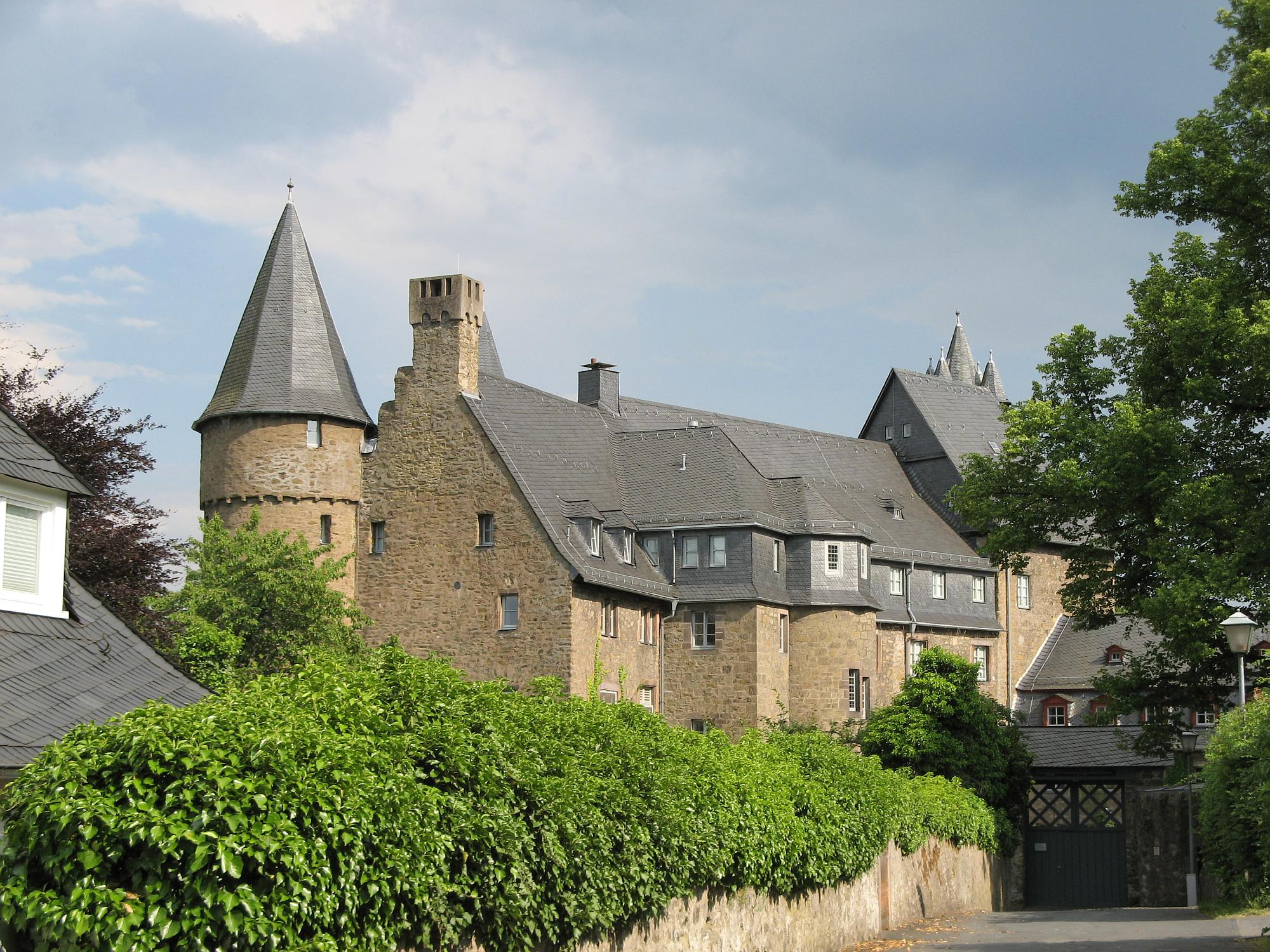
Herborn Castle

===== Counts of Nassau-Beilstein =====
The counts of Nassau in Beilstein were involved mostly in local/regional German affairs in their area of the Rhine.

In 1343, Nassau-Beilstein was split off from Nassau-Dillenburg. After John III's death, Nassau-Beilstein fell back to Nassau-Dillenburg. It was split off again in 1607 (see below) for George, who inherited the rest of Nassau-Dillenburg in 1620.

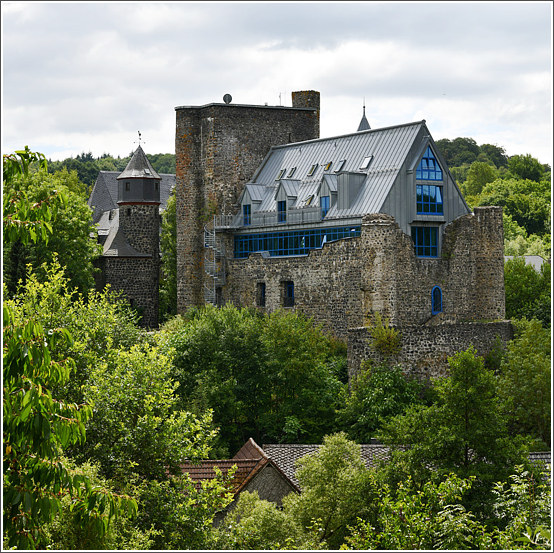
Beilstein Castle

==== First House of Nassau-Siegen ====
The branch of Nassau-Siegen was a collateral line of the House of Nassau, and ruled in Siegen. The first Count of Nassau-Siegen was Henry I, Count of Nassau-Siegen (d. 1343), the elder son of Otto I, Count of Nassau. His son Otto II, Count of Nassau-Siegen ruled also in Dillenburg. In 1328, John, Count of Nassau-Dillenburg died unmarried and childless, and Dillenburg fell to Henry I of Nassau-Siegen. For counts of Nassau-Siegen in between 1343 and 1606, see "Counts of Nassau-Dillenburg" above.

==== Netherland Nassaus/Orange-Nassau ====
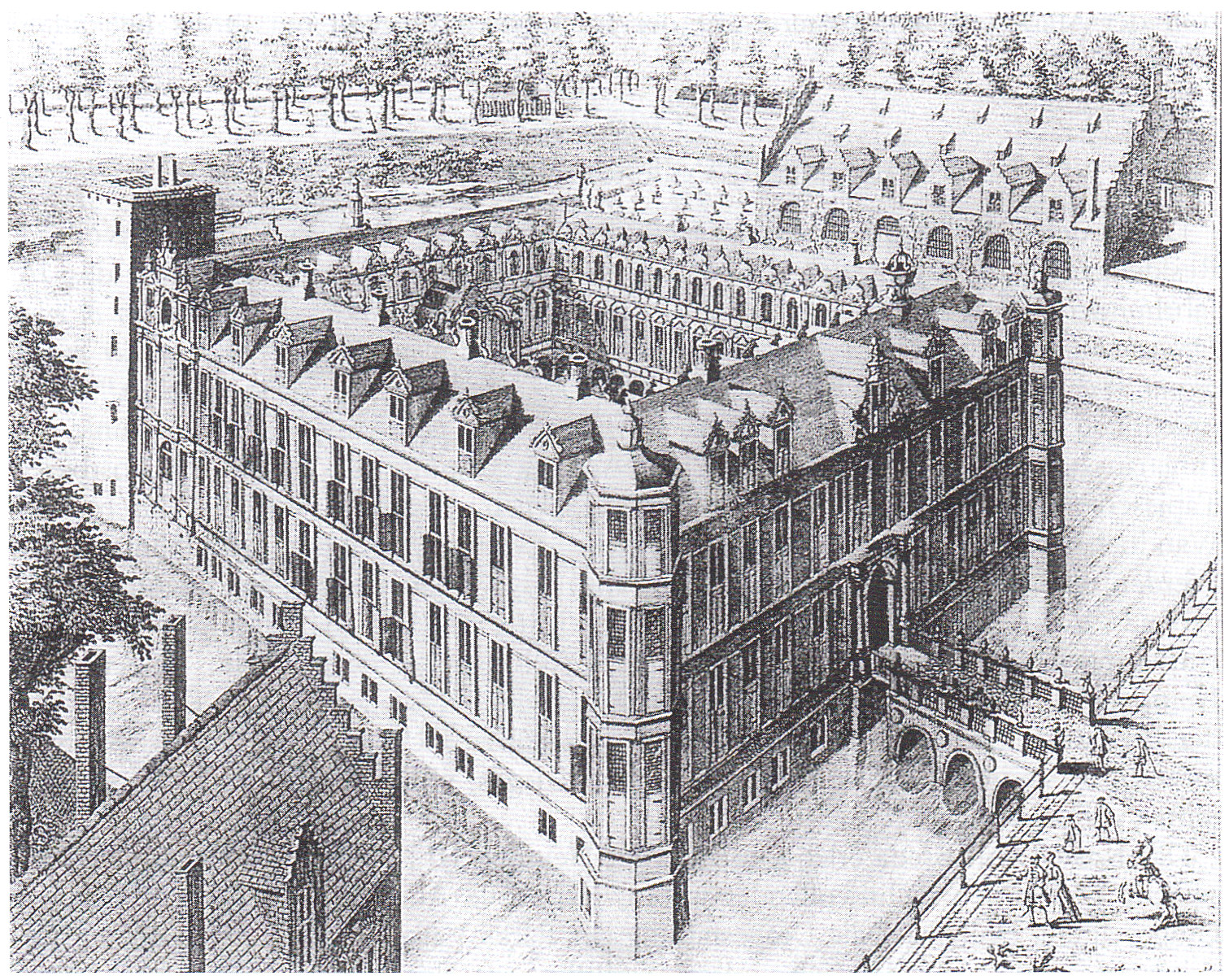
Breda Castle in the 1550s

The House of Orange-Nassau stems from the elder branch of the Ottonian Line. The connection was via Engelbert I, who offered his services to the Duke of Burgundy, married in 1403 Johanna van Polanen, the heiress of the barony of Breda, the lordship of den Lek and other lands in the duchy of Brabant at the mouth of the Rhine delta and the Scheldt river. As the Scheldt was the main trade artery in the Burgundian/Habsburg Netherlands during the time, the Netherand Nassaus benefitted from the commerce. These lands formed the core of the Nassau's Dutch possessions.

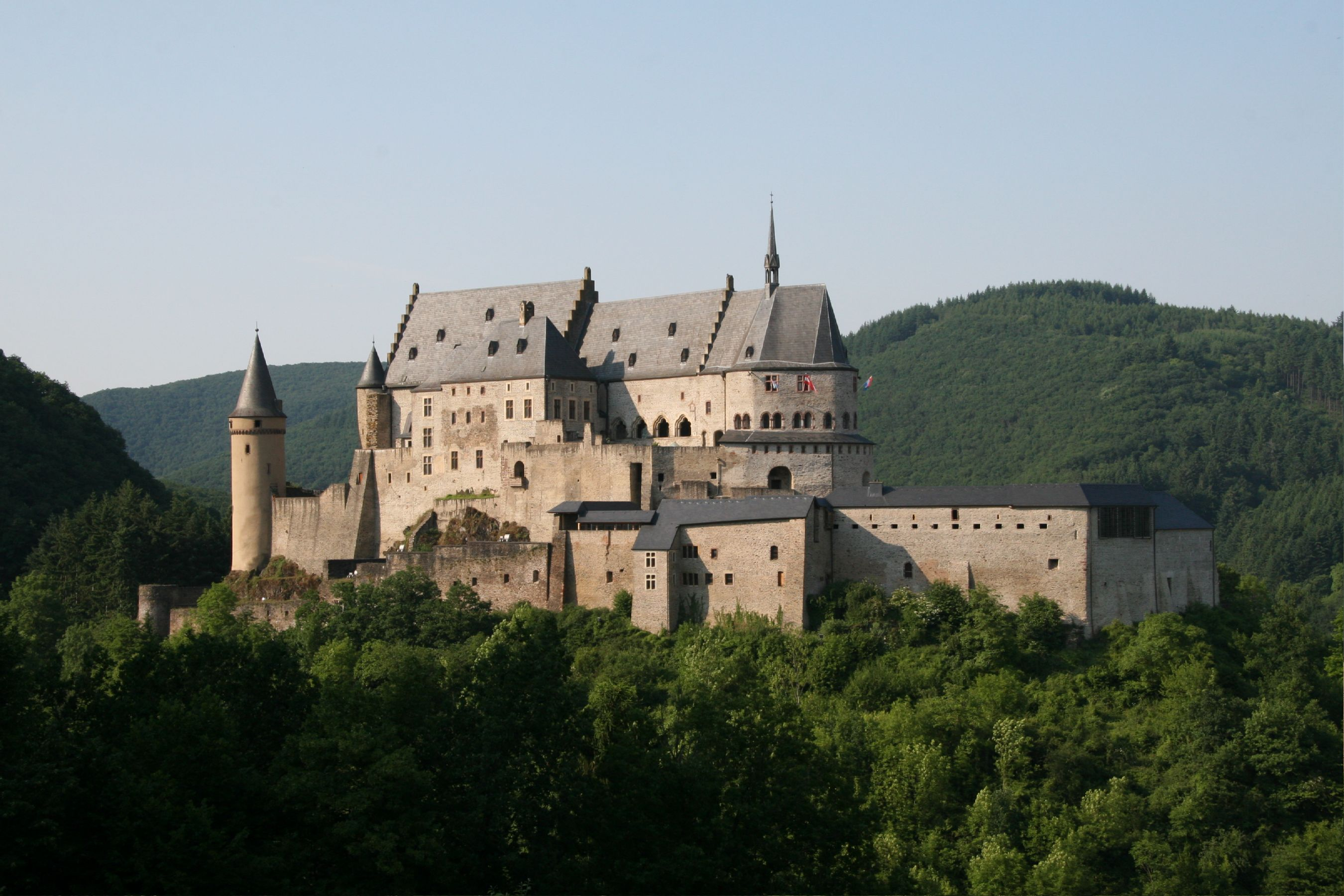
Vianden Castle, Luxembourg, fortress of the Counts of Vianden

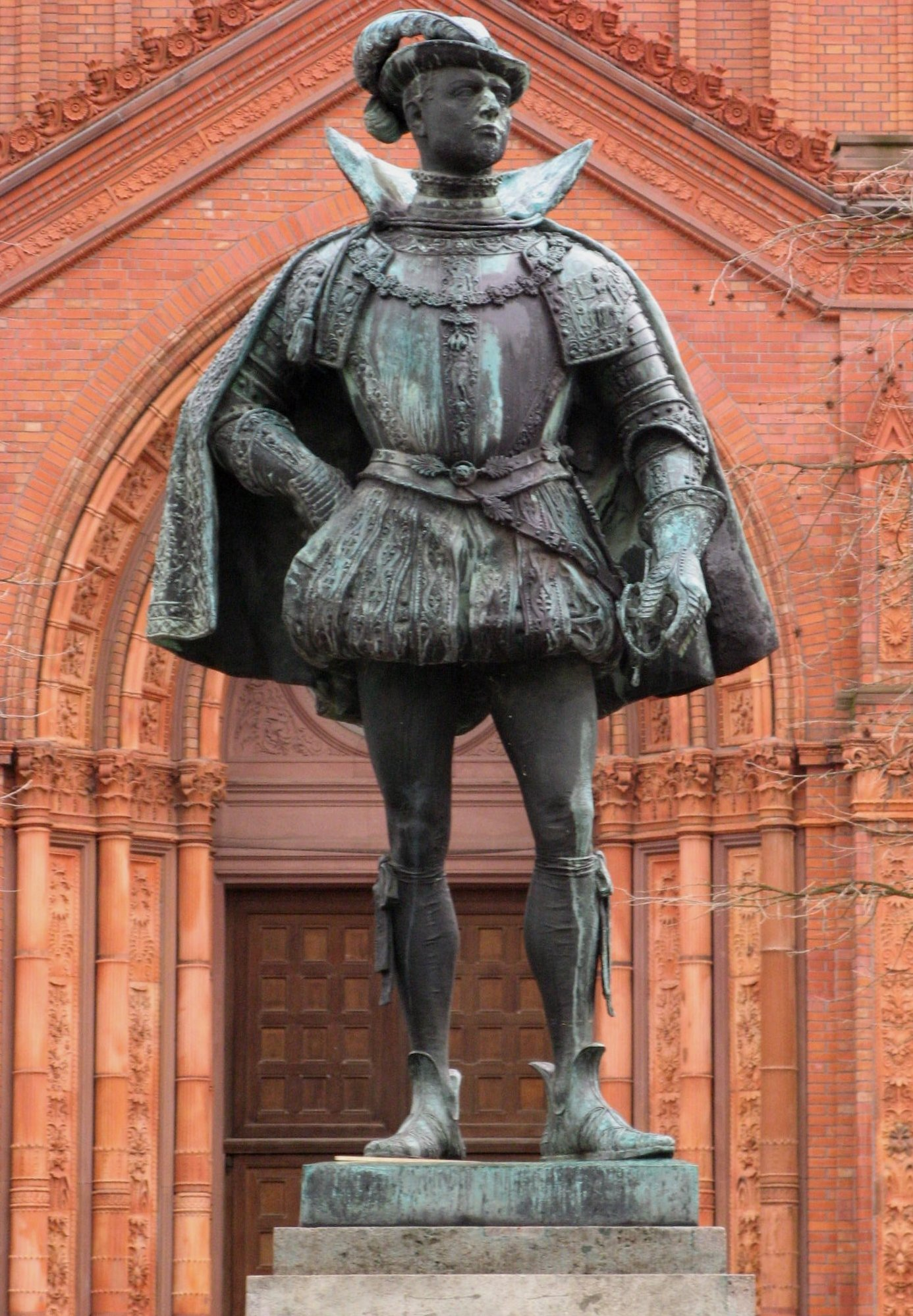
William I. "the Silent" (1544–1584), founder of the Netherlands, statue at Wiesbaden

The importance of the Nassaus grew throughout the 15th and 16th century. Henry III of Nassau-Breda was appointed stadtholder of Holland, Zeeland and Utrecht by Emperor Charles V in the beginning of the 16th century. Henry married Claudia of Chalon-Orange from French Burgundy in 1515. Their son René of Chalon inherited in 1530 the independent and sovereign Principality of Orange from his mother's brother, Philibert of Chalon. As the first Nassau to be the Prince of Orange, René could have used "Orange-Nassau" as his new family name. However, his uncle, in his will, had stipulated that René should continue the use of the name Chalon-Orange. At René's death in 1544, he left all his lands to his cousin William of Nassau-Dillenburg, including the sovereign principality of Orange. This "William I of Orange", in English better known as William the Silent, became the founder of the House of Orange-Nassau and the leader of the Dutch Revolt that lead to the formation of the Dutch Republic as a separate sovereign nation.

Within the government of the Dutch Republic, The Prince of Orange was also not just another noble among equals in the Netherlands. First, he was the traditional leader of the nation in war and in rebellion against Spain. He was uniquely able to transcend the local issues of the cities, towns and provinces. He was also a sovereign ruler in his own right (see Prince of Orange article). This gave him a great deal of prestige, even in a republic. He was the center of a real court like the Stuarts and Bourbons, French speaking, and extravagant to a scale. It was natural for foreign ambassadors and dignitaries to present themselves to him and consult with him as well as to the States General to which they were officially credited. The marriage policy of the princes, allying themselves twice with the Royal Stuarts, also gave them acceptance into the royal caste of rulers.

The house of Orange-Nassau was relatively unlucky in establishing a hereditary dynasty in an age that favoured hereditary rule. The Stuarts and the Bourbons came to power at the same time as the Oranges, the Vasas and Oldenburgs were able to establish a hereditary kingship in Sweden and Denmark, and the Hohenzollerns were able to set themselves on a course to the rule of Germany. The House of Orange was no less gifted than those houses, in fact, some might argue more so, as their ranks included some the foremost statesmen and captains of the time. Although the institutions of the United Provinces became more republican and entrenched as time went on, William the Silent had been offered the countship of Holland and Zealand, and only his assassination prevented his accession to those offices. This fact did not go unforgotten by his successors.

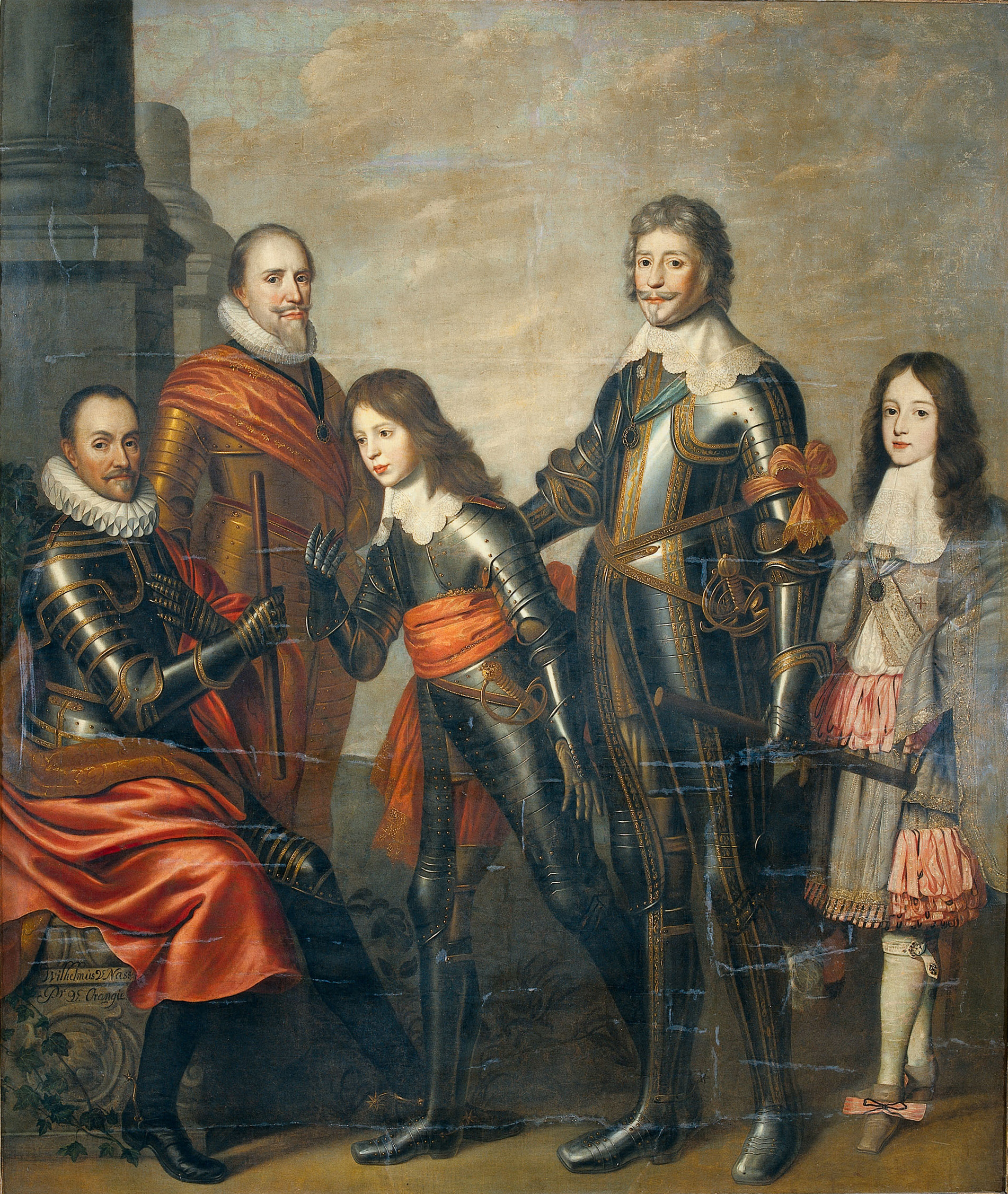
Painting by Willem van Honthorst (1662), showing four generations of Princes of Orange: William I, Maurice and Frederick Henry, William II, and William III.

Besides showing the relationships among the family, the tree above then also points out an extraordinary run of bad luck. In the 211 years from the death of William the Silent to the conquest by France, there was only one time that a son directly succeeded his father as Prince of Orange, Stadholder and Captain-General without a minority (William II). When the Oranges were in power, they also tended to settle for the actualities of power, rather than the appearances, which increasingly tended to upset the ruling regents of the towns and cities. On being offered the dukedom of Gelderland by the States of that province, William III let the offer lapse as liable to raise too much opposition in the other provinces.

The main house of Orange-Nassau also spawned several illegitimate branches. These branches contributed to the political and economic history of England and the Netherlands. Justinus van Nassau was the only extramarital child of William of Orange. He was a Dutch army commander known for unsuccessfully defending Breda against the Spanish, and the depiction of his surrender on the famous picture by Diego Velázquez, The Surrender of Breda. Louis of Nassau, Lord of De Lek and Beverweerd was a younger illegitimate son of Prince Maurice and Margaretha van Mechelen. His descendants were later created Counts of Nassau-LaLecq. One of his sons was the famous general Henry de Nassau, Lord of Overkirk, King William III's Master of the Horse, and one of the most trusted generals of John Churchill, 1st Duke of Marlborough. His descendants became the Earls of Grantham in England. Frederick van Nassau, Lord of Zuylestein, an illegitimate son of Frederick Henry, Prince of Orange, gave rise to the Earls of Rochford in England. The 4th earl of Rochford was a famous English diplomat and a statesman.

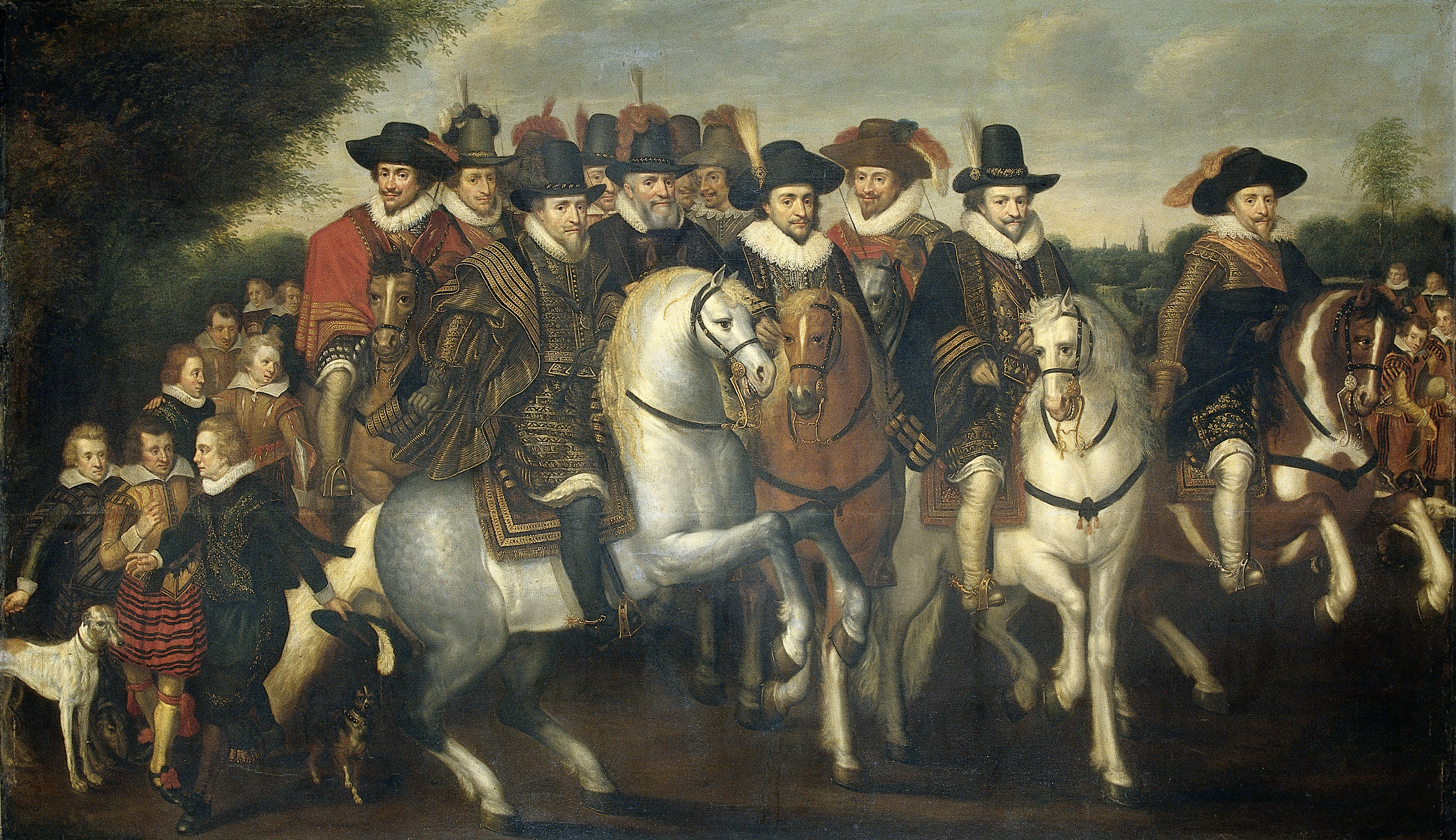
Prins Maurice with his two brothers, their nephew, Frederik V of the Palatine and King of Bohemia, and various members of the House of Nassau on parade. In the first row, from left to right: Prince Maurice, Stadholder of Holland and Captain-General, his nephew Frederik V (1596–1632), Elector Palatine and King of Bohemia, Prince Philip William, then the reigning prince of Orange, and Prince Frederick Henry. in the 2nd row, among others: William Louis, count of Nassau-Dillenburg and Stadholder of Friesland, Ernst Casimir (1573–1632), count of Nassau-Dietz and Louis Gunther, count of Nassau. The painting was entitled 'de Nassausche helden'.

With the death of William III, the legitimate direct male line of William the Silent became extinct and thereby the first House of Orange-Nassau. John William Friso, the senior agnatic descendant of William the Silent's brother and a cognatic descendant of Frederick Henry, grandfather of William III, inherited the princely title and all the possessions in the low countries and Germany, but not the Principality of Orange itself. Orange had been invaded and captured by King Louis XIV in 1672 during the Franco-Dutch War, and again in August 1682, but William did not concede his claim to rule, and recovered the principality via the peace treaties. Louis again invaded and captured the principality in 1702. He enfeoffed François Louis, Prince of Conti, a Bourbon relative of the Chalon dynasty, with the Principality of Orange, so that there were three claimants to the title. The Principality was finally ceded to France under the Treaty of Utrecht that ended the wars with Louis XIV. Frederick I of Prussia ceded the Principality to France (without surrendering the princely title), though John William Friso of Nassau-Dietz, the other claimant to the principality, did not concur. Only with the treaty of partition in 1732 did John William Friso's successor William IV, Prince of Orange, renounce all his claims to the territory, but again (like Frederick I) he did not renounce his claim to the title. In the same treaty an agreement was made between both claimants, stipulating that both houses be allowed to use the title. John William Friso, who also was the Prince of Nassau-Dietz, founded thereby the second House of Orange-Nassau (the suffix name "Dietz" was dropped of the combined name Orange-Nassau-Dietz).

The Revolutionary and Napoleonic era was a tumultuous episode of the history of both the Ottonian and Walramian branches of the House of Nassau. France's dominance of the international order severely strained the House of Nassau's traditional strategy of international conflict resolution, which was to maintain links with all serious power-brokers through a dynastic network in the hope of playing one off against the other. Despite that both branches of the House of Nassau reinvigorated the dynastic network in the years of liberation, 1812–1814, the post-Napoleonic European order saw both branches set on different historical paths.

After the post-Napoleonic reorganization of Europe, the head of House of Orange-Nassau became "King/Queen of the Netherlands".

===== Princes of Orange =====
====== House of Orange-Nassau ======
- 1544–1584: William I, also Count of Katzenelnbogen, Vianden, Dietz, Buren and Leerdam and Lord of IJsselstein, Baron of Breda, etc. Stadholder of Holland, Zealand and Utrect, etc.
- 1584–1618: Philip William, also Count of Nassau-Dillenburg, Count of Vianden, Buren and Leerdam and Lord of IJsselstein, Baron of Breda, etc.
- 1618–1625: Maurice, also Count of Nassau-Dillenburg, Count of Vianden, Buren and Leerdam and Lord of IJsselstein, Baron of Breda, etc. Stadholder of Holland, Zealand and Utrect, etc., Captain-General of the Armies of the Dutch Republic.
- 1625–1647: Frederick Henry, also Count of Nassau-Dillenburg, Count of Vianden, Buren and Leerdam and Lord of IJsselstein, Baron of Breda, etc. Stadholder of Holland, Zealand and Utrect, etc., Captain-General of the Armies of the Dutch Republic.
- 1647–1650: William II, also Count of Nassau-Dillenburg, Count of Vianden, Buren and Leerdam and Lord of IJsselstein, Baron of Breda, etc., Stadholder of Holland, Zealand and Utrect, etc., Captain-General of the Armies of the Dutch Republic.
- 1650–1702: William III, also Count of Nassau-Dillenburg, Count of Vianden, Buren and Leerdam, Lord of IJsselstein, Baron of Breda, etc., Stadholder of Holland, Zealand and Utrect, etc., Captain-General of the Armies of the Dutch Republic, and (from 1689) King of England, Scotland, and Ireland

In 1702, the Orange-Nassau line ended with King William III. He named his cousin John William Friso of Nassau-Dietz as his heir in The Netherlands and the principality of Orange, passing over the claims of the Hohenzollerns of Brandenburg/Prussia.

====== Second House of Orange-Nassau(-Dietz) ======
- 1702–1711: John William Friso, also Prince of Nassau-Dietz, Count of Vianden, Buren and Leerdam and Lord of IJsselstein, Baron of Breda, etc. Stadholder of Holland, Zealand and Utrect, etc., Captain-General of the Armies of the Dutch Republic.
- 1711–1751: William IV, also Prince of Nassau-Dietz, Count of Vianden, Buren and Leerdam and Lord of IJsselstein, Baron of Breda, etc. Stadholder of Holland, Zealand and Utrect, etc., Captain-General of the Armies of the Dutch Republic.
- 1751–1806: William V, also Prince of Nassau-Dietz, Count of Vianden, Buren and Leerdam and Lord of IJsselstein, Baron of Breda, etc. Stadholder of Holland, Zealand and Utrect, etc., Captain-General of the Armies of the Dutch Republic.
- 1806–1815: William VI, also Prince of Fulda and Count of Corvey, Weingarten and Dortmund; in 1815 became King William I of the Netherlands

Royal coat of arms of the Netherlands

===== Kings and Queens of the Netherlands (from the House of Orange-Nassau-Dietz) =====
- 1815–1840: William I, also Duke and Grand Duke of Luxemburg and Duke of Limburg
- 1840–1849: William II, also Grand Duke of Luxemburg and Duke of Limburg
- 1849–1890: William III, also Grand Duke of Luxemburg and Duke of Limburg
- 1890–1948: Wilhelmina

Following the laws of the Holy Roman Empire (which was abolished in 1806), the House of Orange-Nassau(-Dietz) has been extinct since the death of Wilhelmina (1962). Dutch laws and the Dutch nation do not consider it extinct.

- 1948–1980: Juliana
- 1980–2013: Beatrix
- 2013–present: Willem-Alexander
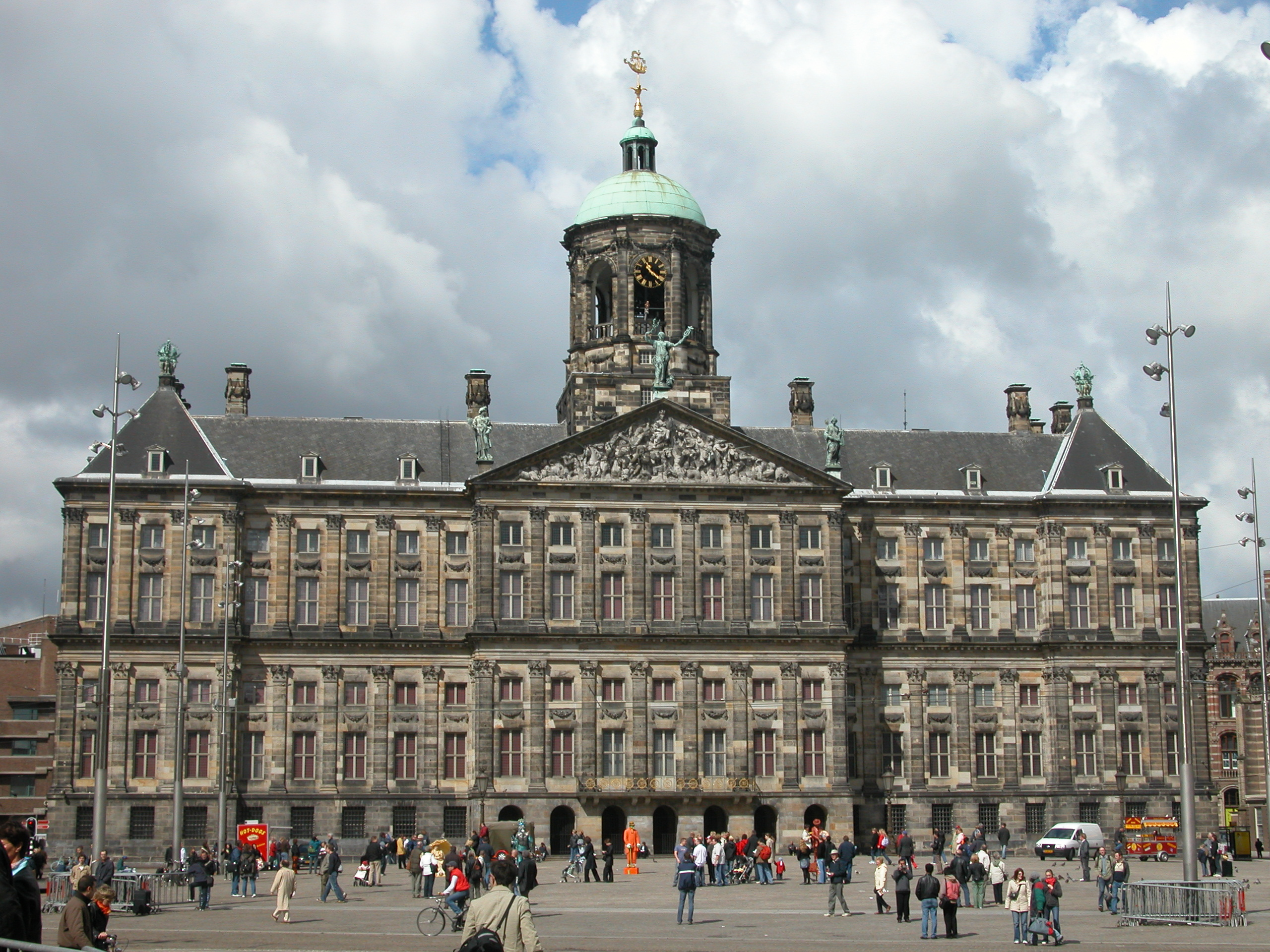
Royal Palace of Amsterdam

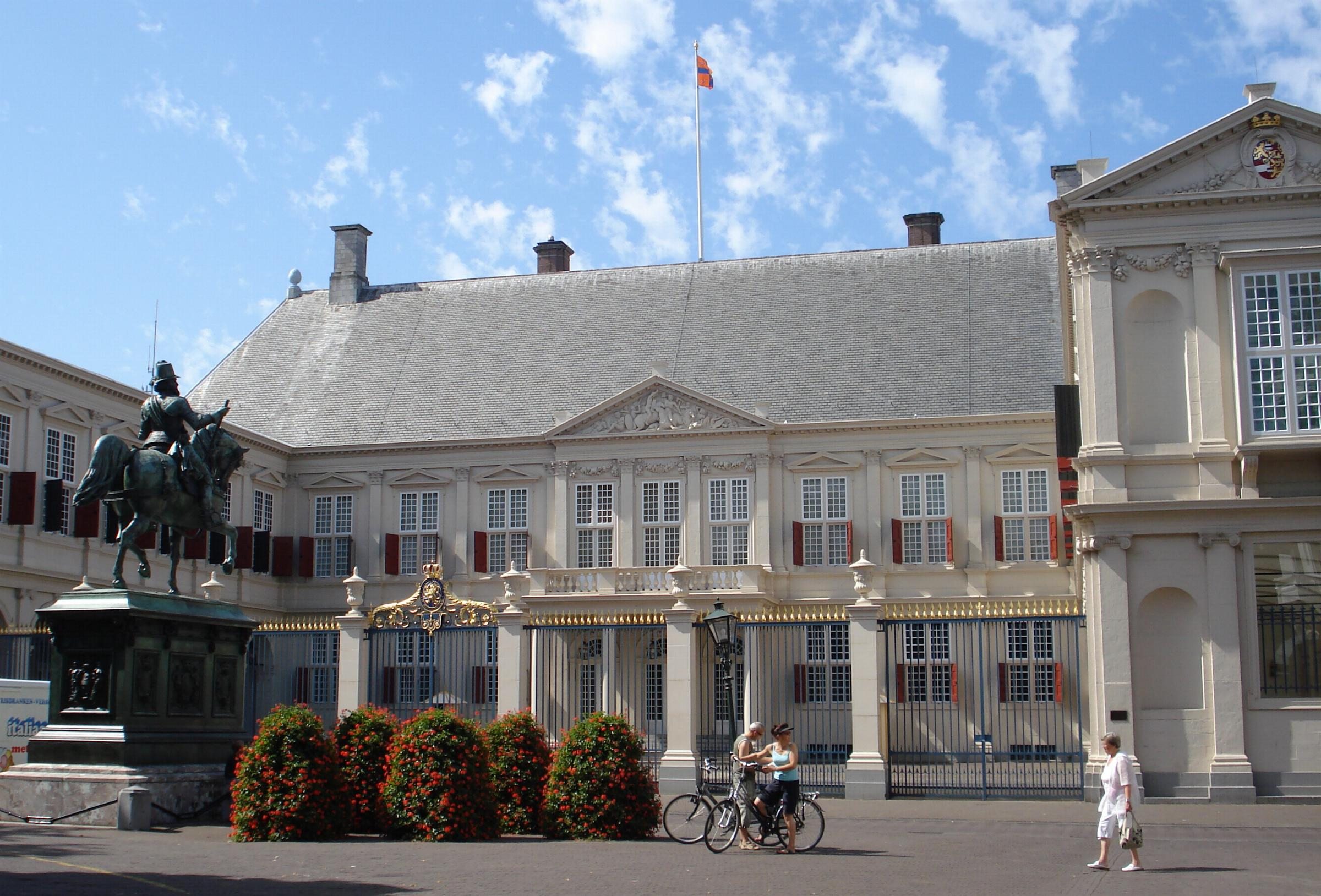
Noordeinde Palace, Den Haag

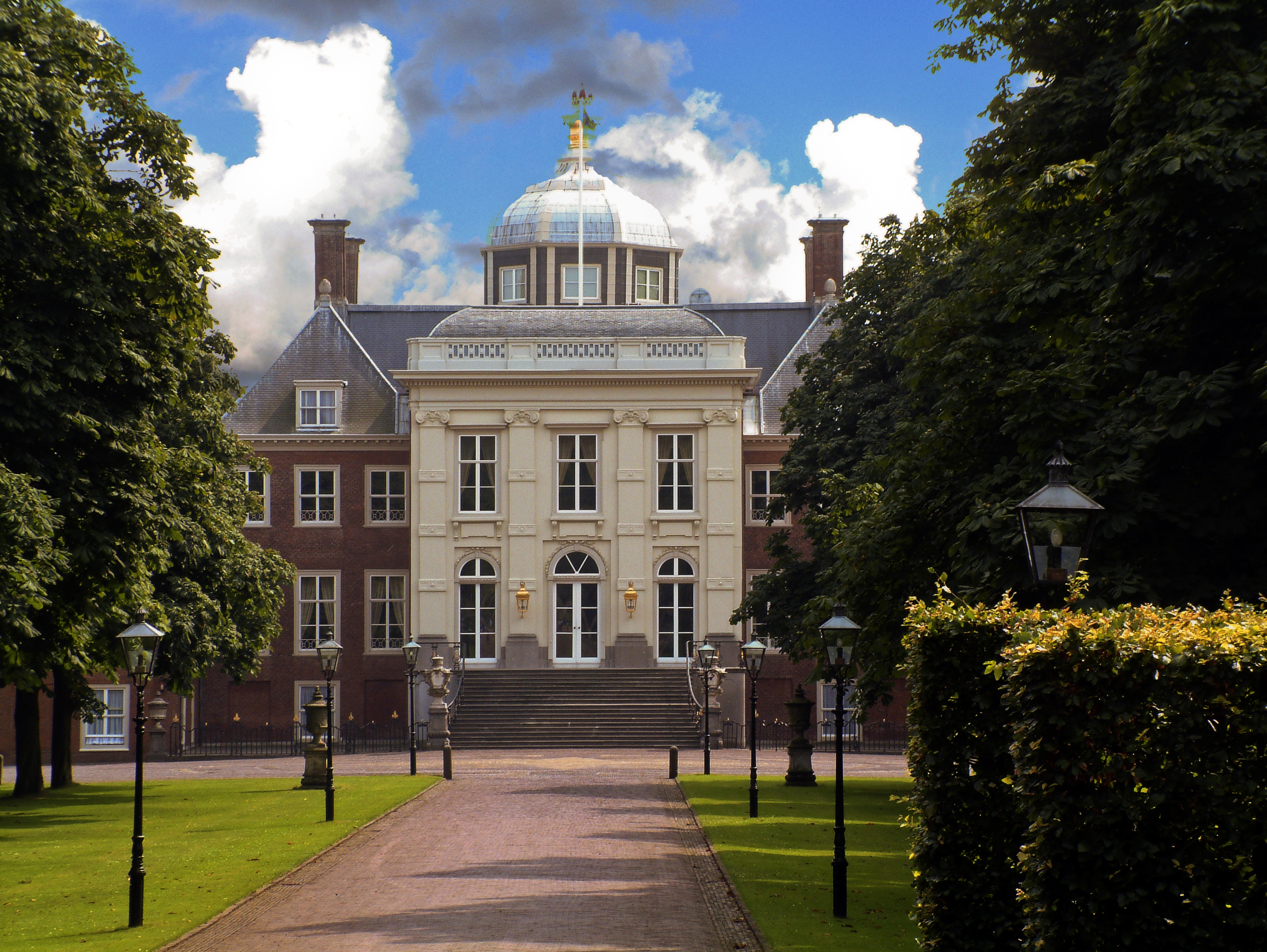
Huis ten Bosch, Den Haag

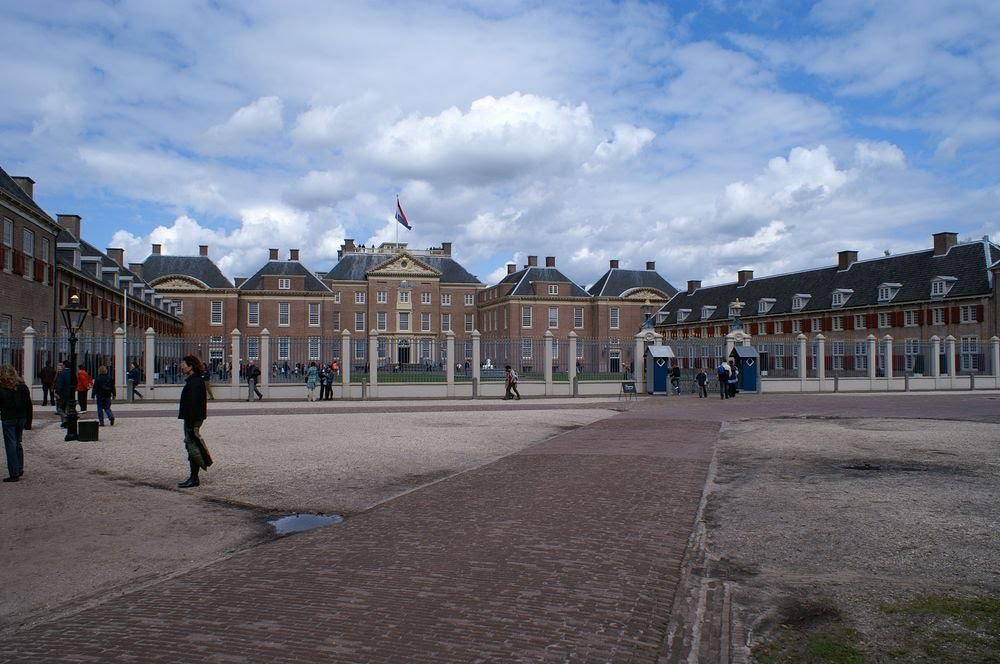
Het Loo Palace

==== Younger lines of the Ottonian House of Nassau, 16th, 17th, and 18th centuries ====
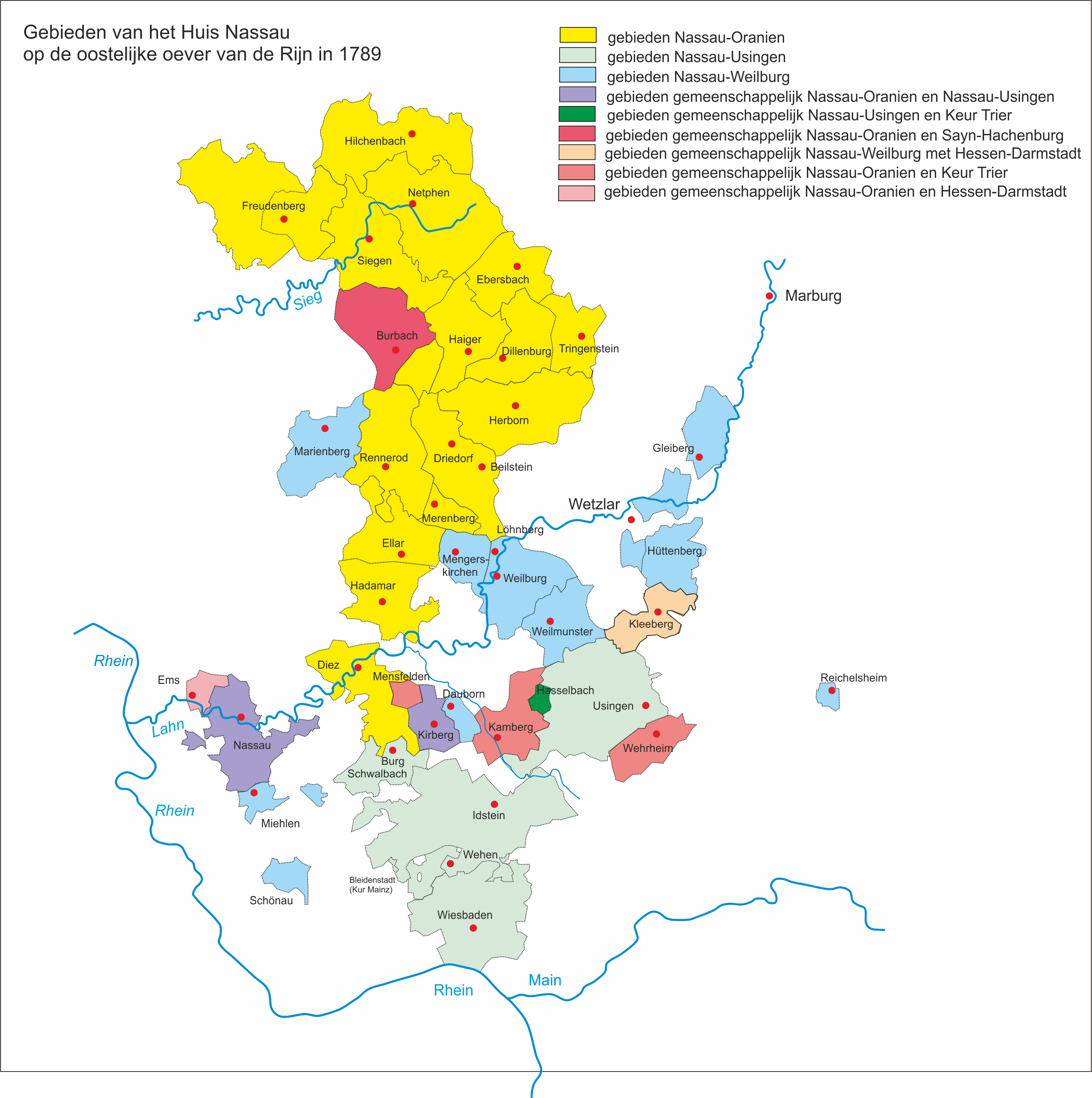
Lands of Nassau in 1789

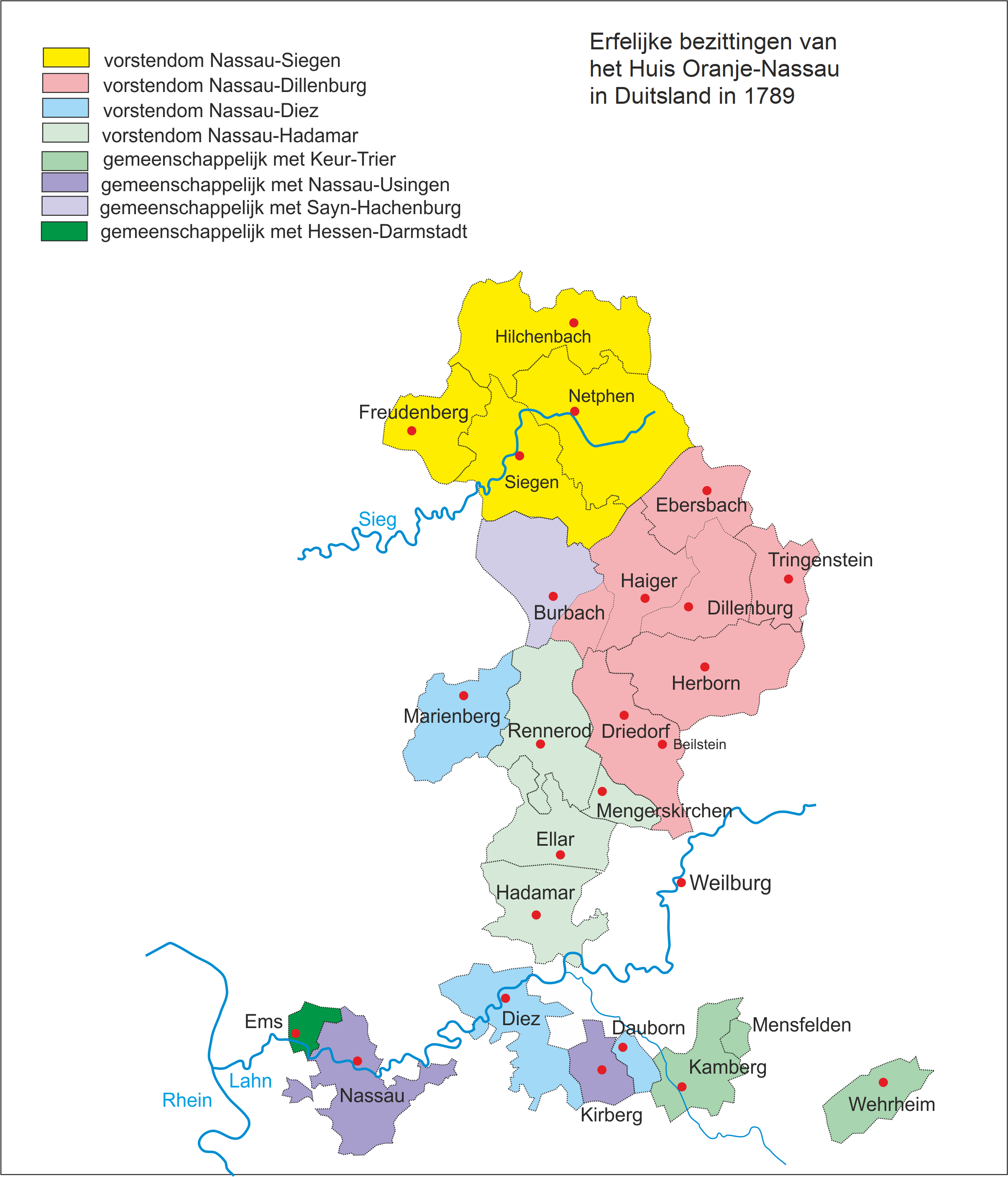
Lands of Nassau in 1796

When William the Silent inherited the lands of the Netherland Nassaus and the Principality of Orange, the German lands in the county of Nassau went to his younger brother, Jan VI, as shown below, and were subdivided amongst his surviving sons in 1606. A good many of these maintained ties with the Dutch Republic and served as stadholders and officers in the Dutch States Army.

===== Counts of Nassau-Dillenburg, continuation =====
The counts of Nassau in Dillenburg were the continuation of the main line of the Ottonian counts of Nassau, although only the 2nd oldest after The Netherlands Nassaus/house of Orange-Nassau. John VI is called the "elder", but this is not in relation to his older brother William the Silent, but in relation to his son, John VII "the Middle" and his grandson, John VIII "the younger". In the male line, the kings of The Netherlands spring from John VI until Queen Wilhelmina abdicated in 1948. John VI played a leading role during the Dutch Revolt: he was the principal author of the Union of Utrecht, which was the constitution of the Dutch Republic. He also served as stadholder of Utrect and Gelderland when they were reconquered from the Spanish. His eldest son, William Louis "Us Heit" (West Frisian for "our father") was Stadholder of Friesland, Groningen, and Drenthe, a General in the Dutch States Army and the chief lieutenant of his cousin Prince Maurice of Nassau, in their innovations in military strategy and organization, victories in the field, and governing of the Dutch Republic.

===== Second House of Nassau-Dietz =====
The counts (later princes in 1650) of Nassau-Dietz continued their service to the Dutch Republic. After the death of William Louis (see Second House of Nassau-Dillenburg) they were usually elected Stadholder of Friesland, Groningen, and Drenthe. They also served as senior Generals in the Dutch States Army.

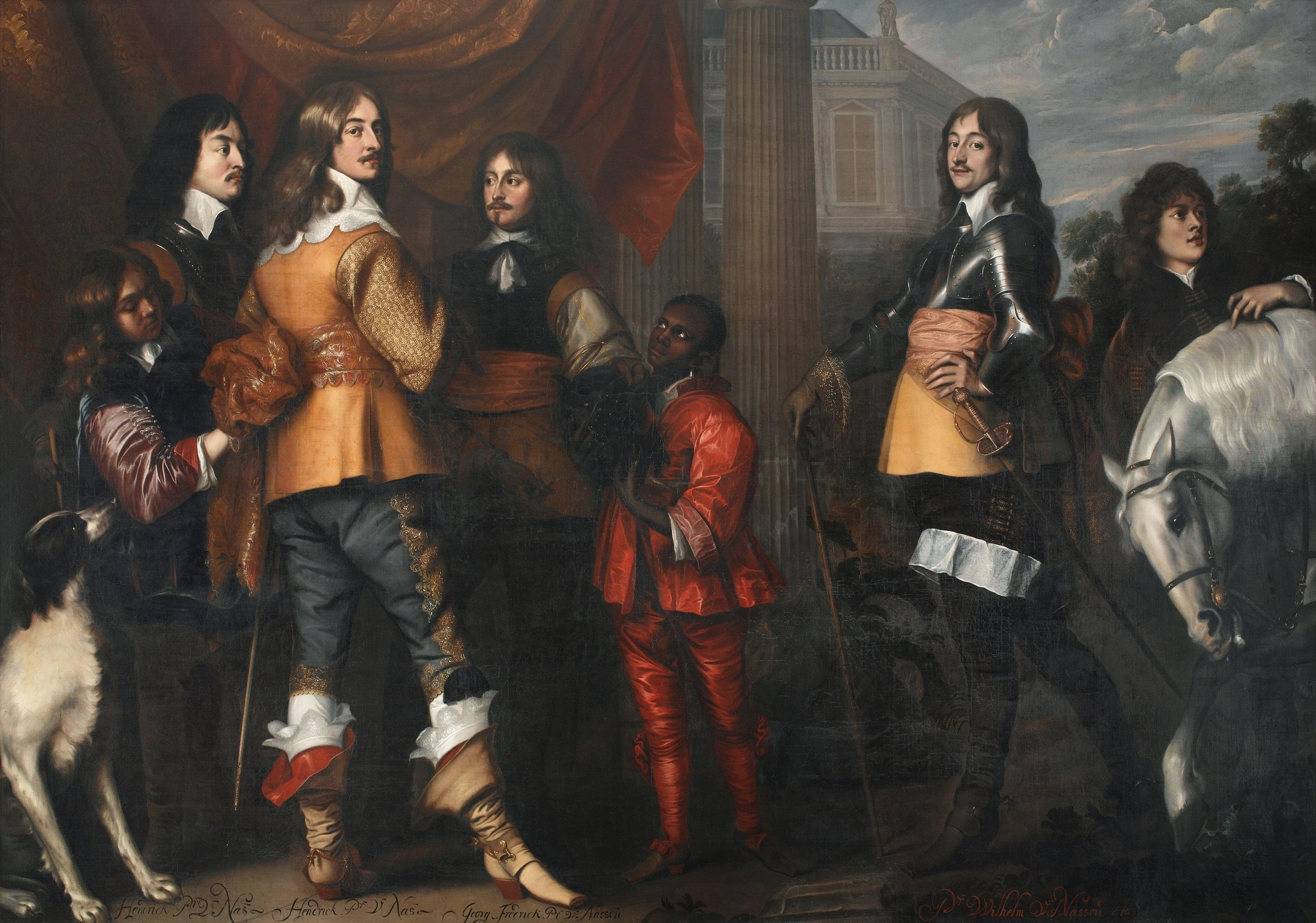
Princes of the House of Nassau-Dietz from the Stadhouderlijk Hof of Paleis in Leeuwaarden, H.Prince of Nassau, Henry Casimir, Prince of Nassau, George, Prince of Nassau, and Willem Frederick, Prince of Nassau-Dietz

In his will, William III appointed John William Friso as his heir in The Netherlands (his lordships being his property to dispose of by law) as well as his heir to the principality of Orange, the principality being a sovereign state, and so his right to appoint his successor. This was contested by the House of Hohenzollern, kings of Prussia, and not finally settled until the mid 18th century. In any case, the succession was in the title only, as Louis XIV of France had conquered the actual territory.

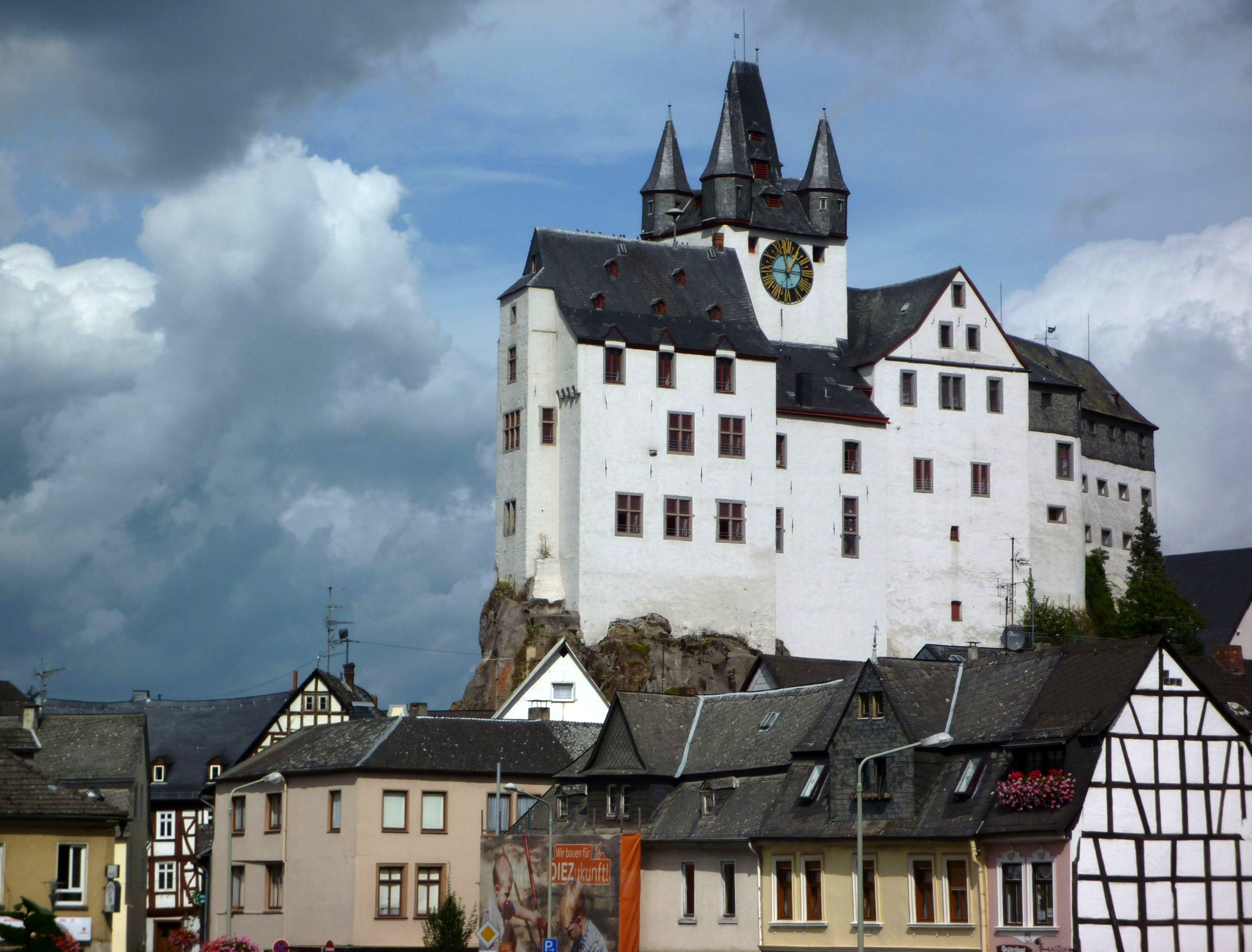
Diez Castle

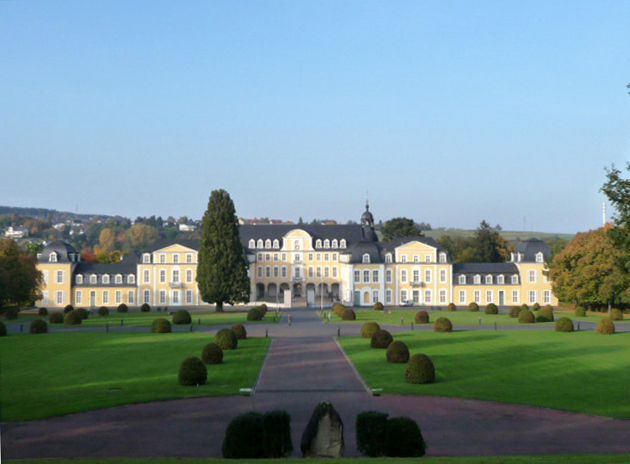
Oranienstein Castle, Diez

===== Second House of Nassau-Hadamar =====
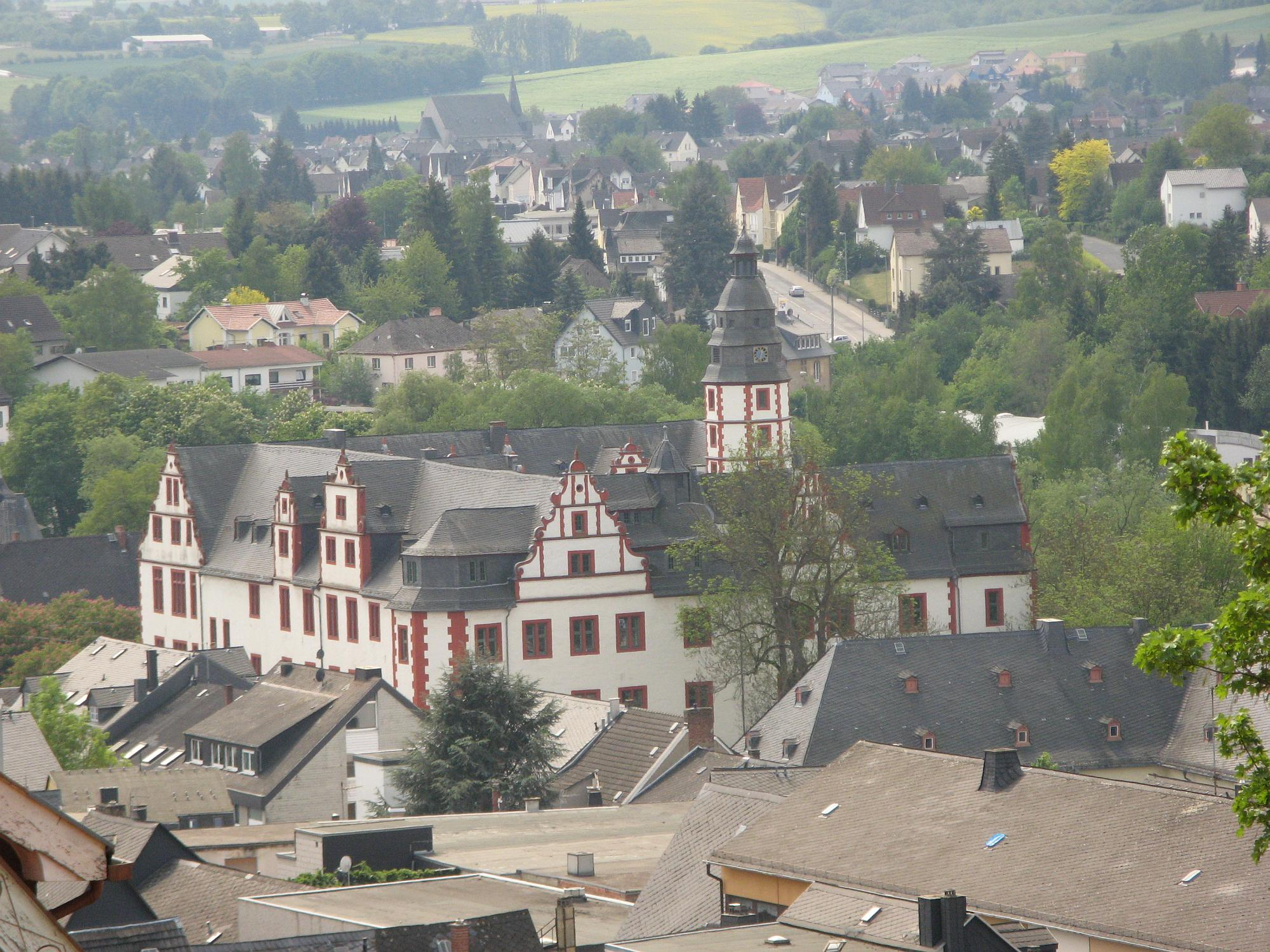
Hadamar Castle

In 1620, the younger line of Nassau-Hadamar was split off from Nassau-Dillenburg, as shown below. John Louis, the first count, was a diplomat, who tried to protect his county from the ravages of the Thirty Years War. In 1647, for his efforts in bringing about peace between Spain and the Netherlands, King Philip IV of Spain appointed him a knight in the Order of the Golden Fleece. In addition, as a special thanks for his role in establishing the Peace of Westphalia, he was elevated to the rank of prince in 1650 by Emperor Ferdinand III. He did convert to Catholicism, so that Hadamar was Catholic after that.

===== Second House of Nassau-Siegen =====
In 1606, the younger line of Nassau-Siegen was split off from the House of Nassau-Dillenburg for John VII "the Middle". As Dillenburg eventually was inherited by a younger son of John VI (see below), the line of Nassau-Siegen became the elder line of the Ottonian House of Nassau. After John VII of Nassau-Siegen died in 1628, the land was divided:

- His eldest son, John VIII "the Younger", had converted to Catholicism and joined the Spanish Army. This caused a rivalry between him and his brother John Maurice below. The result was that Siegen was split. John VIII received the part of the county south of the river Sieg and the original castle in Siegen (which after 1695 was called the "Upper Castle"). John VIII was the founder of the Catholic line of Nassau-Siegen.

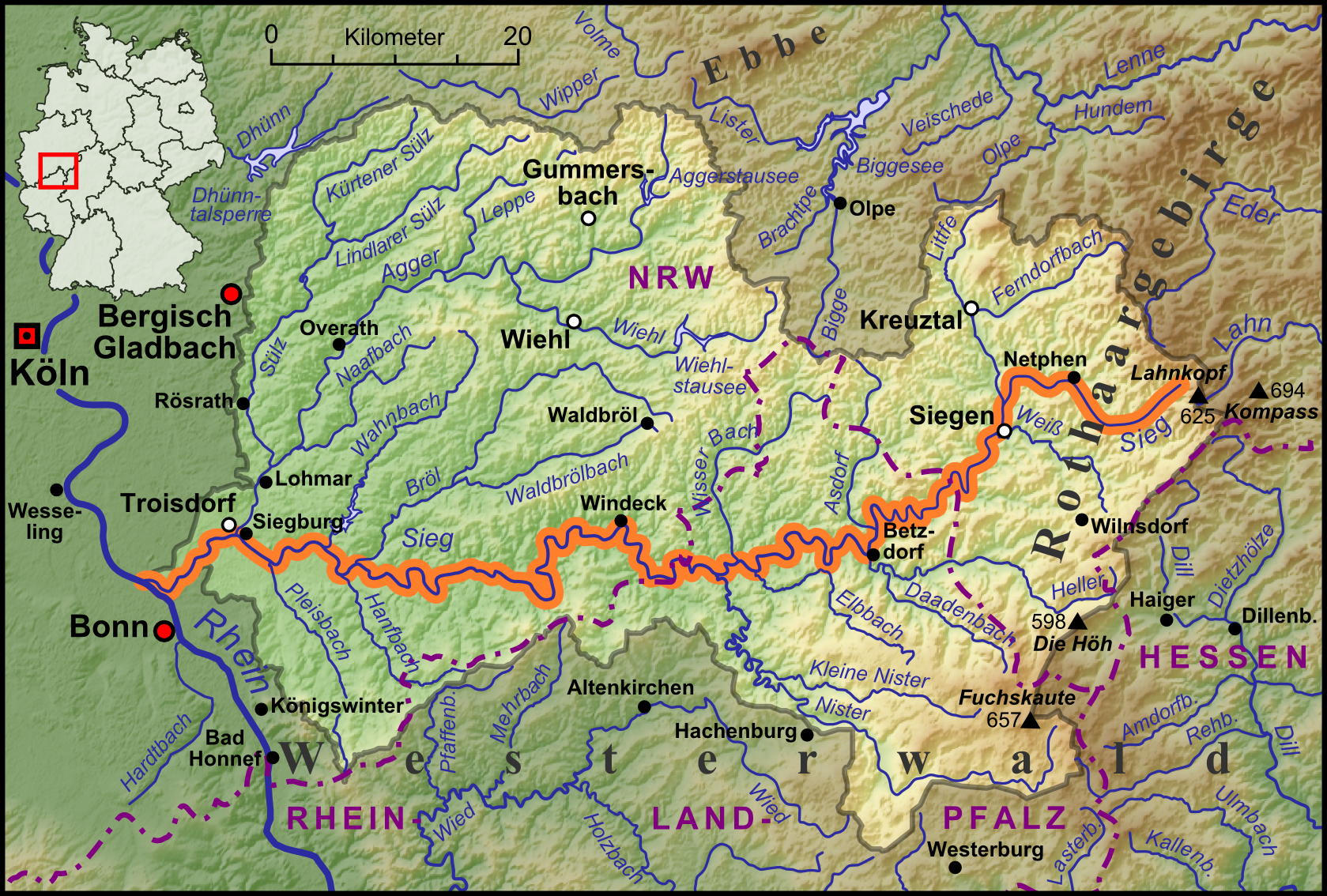
Sieg River through Nassau

- John Maurice, who remained Protestant, was a soldier. He received the part of the county north of the Sieg. He was the founder of the Protestant line of Nassau-Siegen and he converted the former Franciscan monastery into a new residence, called the "Lower Castle", which was reconstructed after having burnt down at large parts in 1695. John Maurice spent most of his time away from Siegen, since he was governor of Dutch Brazil and later of the Prussian province of Cleves, Mark, and Ravensberg. In 1668, he was appointed first field-marshal of the Dutch States Army, and in 1673, he was charged by the Stadtholder William III to command the forces in Friesland and Groningen, and to defend the eastern frontier of the provinces, again against Van Galen. In 1675, his health compelled him to give up active military service, and he spent his last years in his beloved Cleves, where he died in December 1679. Between 1638 and 1674, his brother George Frederick ruled the Protestant part of the country.

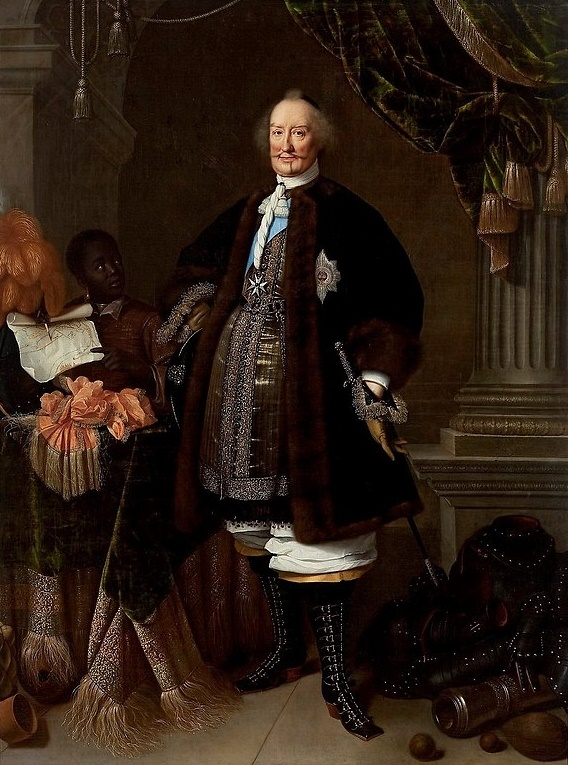
John Maurice of Nassau

In 1652, John Francis Desideratus of the Catholic line was elevated to Imperial Prince. Count Henry of the Protestant line married Mary Magdalene of Limburg-Stirum, who brought the Lordship of Wisch in the County of Zutphen into the marriage. In 1652, John Maurice of the Protestant line was also elevated to Imperial Prince.

In 1734, the Protestant line died out with the death of Frederick William II. Protestant Nassau-Siegen was annexed by Christian of Nassau-Dillenburg and William IV of Nassau-Diez. When William Hyacinth, the last ruler of the Catholic line, died in 1743, Nassau-Siegen had died out in the male line, and the territory fell to Prince William IV of the Orange-Nassau-Dietz line, who thereby reunited all the lands of the Ottonian line of the House of Nassau.

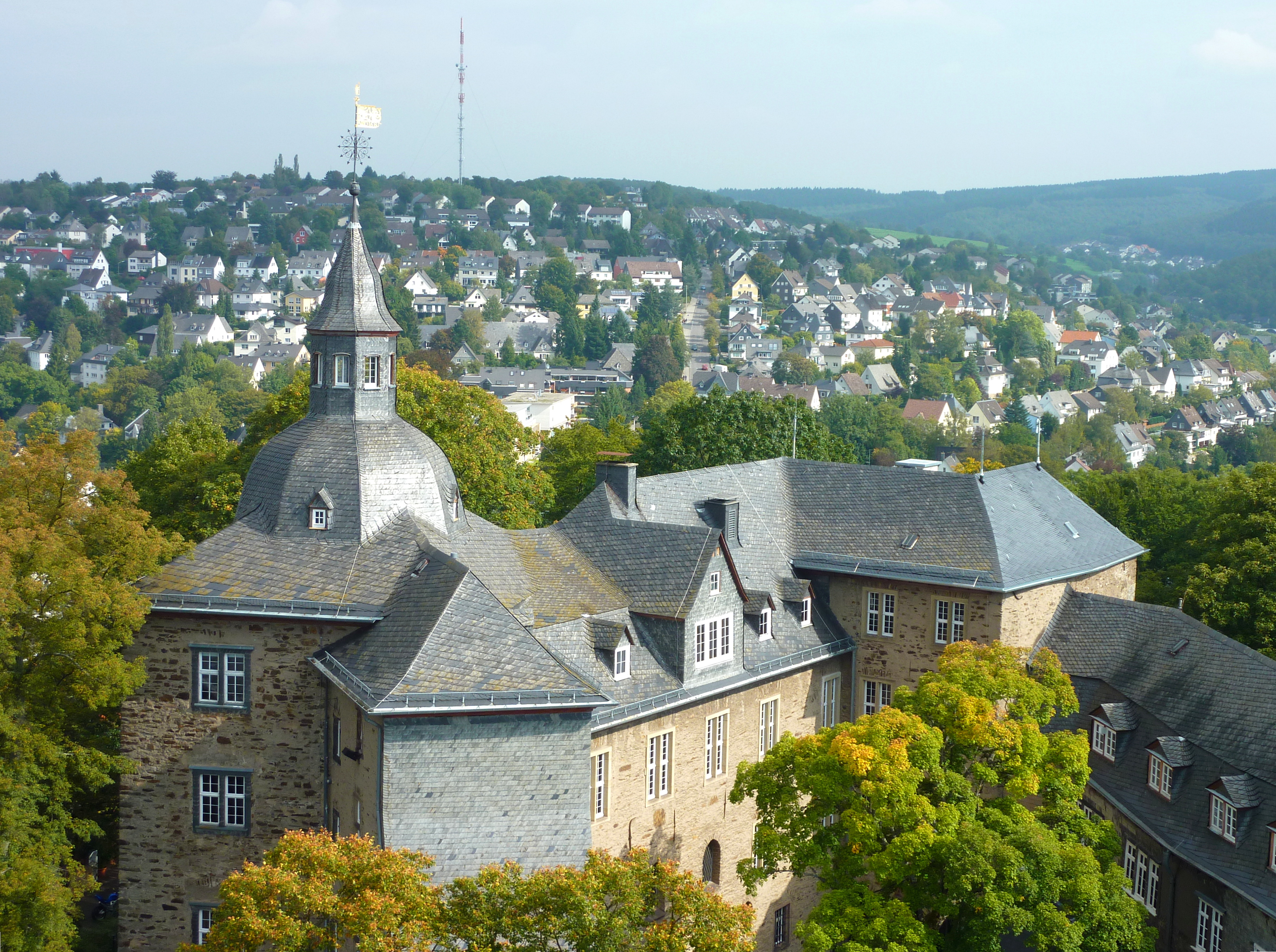
Siegen, Upper Castle

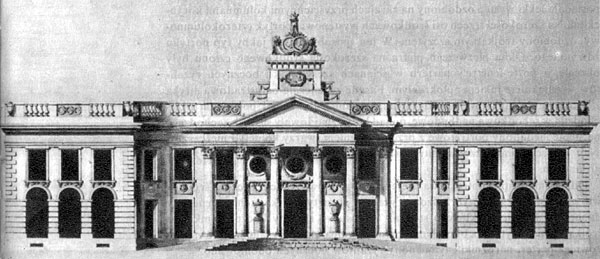
Gozdzki – de Nassau Palace in Warsaw that belonged to wealthy Karolina Gozdzka (1747–1807) and her husband Charles Henry de Nassau-Siegen (1745–1808).

House of Nassau in(zu) Siegen
Elder (Catholic) Line	Younger (Protestant) Line	Dates
John VII		1606–1623
John VIII		1623–1638
	William	1624–1642
	John Maurice	1632–1636
John Francis Desideratus		1638–1699
	John Maurice	1642–1679
	William Maurice	1679–1691
	Frederick William Adolf	1691–1722
William Hyacinth		1699–1743
	Frederick William II	1722–1734
	annexed by Nassau-Dillenburg and Orange-Nassau(-Dietz)	1734
inherited by Orange-Nassau(-Dietz)		1743

== Overview of Nassau coats of arms ==
=== Background and origins ===
The ancestral coat of arms of the Ottonian line of the house of Nassau is shown below. Their distant cousins of the Walramian line added a red coronet to distinguish them. There is no documentation on how and why these arms came to be. As a symbol of nobility, the lion was always a popular in western culture going all the way back to Hercules. Using the heraldic insignia of a dominant power was a way, and still is a way, to show loyalty to that power. Not using that insignia is a way to show independence. The Netherlands, as territories bordering on the Holy Roman Empire with its Roman eagle and France with its Fleur-de-lis, had many examples of this. The lion was so heavily used in the Netherlands for various provinces and families (see Leo Belgicus) that it became the national arms of the Dutch Republic, its successor states the Netherlands, Belgium, and Luxembourg. Blue, because of its nearness to purple, which in the northern climes tended to fade (red was the other choice), was also a popular color for those with royal aspirations. The billets could have been anything from blocks of wood to abstractions of the reinforcements holding the shield together. The fact that these were arms were very similar to those of the counts of Burgundy (Franche-Comté) did not seem to cause too much confusion. It also held with one of the basic tenets of heraldry, that arms could not be repeated within a kingdom, but Nassau was considered to be in the Kingdom of Germany, while Franche-Comté was in the kingdom of Burgundy (see also Scrope v Grosvenor).

Coats of arms of sovereignty also show the territories that the dynasty claims to rule over. The principle ones are depicted below, i.e.

- The Principality of Orange, which gave them their major title and claim to equal status with all the other sovereign rulers of the world, Prince of Orange.

Then,

- The Lordship of Chalons and Arlay, a large set of lands in the Franche-Comté
- The County of Geneva

And in Germany,

- County of Katzenelnbogen a large set of lands near the County of Nassau
- The County of Dietz, also near the County of Nassau
- County of Meurs, bordering on the northeastern Netherlands

Finally, in the Netherlands, the real base of their wealth and power:

- County of Vianden, in the southern Netherlands along the river Meuse.
- Marquisate of Vlissingen (Flushing) and KampenVeere, which sat along the mouth of the Rhine and the trade routes across the North Sea and the world beyond.
- County of Buren, also long the delta of the Rhine, but further inland.

In most of the estates in the more populous provinces of Holland and Zealand, the land itself was secondary to the profit on the commerce that flowed through it.

Arms of dynastic founders
Ottonian (Younger) Line	Walramian (Elder) Line

Arms of the dominions of the Princes of Orange
Prince of Orange	Lords of Chalons and Arlay	Counts of Geneva
Counts of Katzenelnbogen	County of Dietz	Counts of Vianden
Marquis of Vlissingen (Flushing) and KampenVeere	Count of Buren	Count of Meurs

=== Arms of branches ===
Arms of the Grand Dukes of Luxembourg
Arms of Adolf of Nassau, King of Germany/King of the Romans (1292–1298)	Arms of the Grand Duke of Luxembourg (1890–1898)	Arms of the Grand Duke of Luxembourg (1898–2000)	Arms of the Grand Duke of Luxembourg (2000–present).	Personal Arms of the Grand Duke of Luxembourg (2000–present).

Arms of the Princes of Orange
Arms of René of Chalon and Nassau as Prince of Orange, 1530–1544	Arms of the Prince of Orange 1544–1582, 1584–1618	Arms of the Prince of Orange, 1582–1584, 1625–1702	Alternate arms of the Prince of Orange	Arms of William III as King of England, Scotland and Ireland, 1688–1702

Arms of the Kings of the Netherlands
Arms of the King of the Netherlands, 1815–1907	Arms of the Queens and King of the Netherlands, 1907–present	Arms of the Prince of Orange/Crown Prince of the Netherlands, 1980–2013	Arms of the Princess of Orange/Crown Princess of the Netherlands, 2013–present

== Family tree ==
Family Trees of the House of Nassau

Family tree of the House of Nassau

The following family tree is compiled from Wikipedia and the reference cited in the note

Dudo of Laurenburg (c. 1060 – c. 1123); Count of Laurenburg r.1093
Rupert (Ruprecht) I of Nassau (c. 1090 – c. 1154) co-Count of Laurenburg r.1123 1st Count of Nassau	Arnold I Count of Laurenburg (d.c. 1148)
Rupert (Ruprecht) II; Count of Laurenburg (1154–1158)(d.c. 1159)	Walram I (French: Valéran) (c. 1146–1198) was the first (legally titled); Count of Nassau (1154–1198)	Henry (Heinrich) I co-Count of Nassau (1160 – August 1167)	Rupert (Ruprecht) III the Bellicose (d.1191) co-Count of Nassau (1160–1191)
Henry (Heinrich) II the Rich; Count of Nassau (1180–1251)	Rupert (Ruprecht) IV; Count of Nassau (1198–1230); Teutonic Knight (1230–1240)	Herrmann (d.aft. 3 December 1240); Canon of Mainz Cathedral
Walram II of Nassau (c. 1220 – 1276); WALRAMIAN Branch; Present-day rulers of Luxembourg	Rupert (Ruprecht) V d.before 1247; Teutonic Knight (1230–1240)	Otto I of Nassau (reigned c. 1247 – 1290); OTTONIAN branch Present-day rulers of the Netherlands	John (c. 1230 – 1309); Bishop-Elect of Utrecht (1267–1290)
Adolf (c. 1255–1298); King of Germany (1292–1298)	Henry I (d.1343); Count of Nassau-Siegen	Emicho I (d.7 June 1334); Count of Nassau-Hadamar extinct 1394	John (d.1328); Count Nassau-Dillenburg
Ruprecht (d.1304)	Gerlach I Count of Nassau-Wiesbaden (bef.1288–1361)	Walram III; Count of Nassau-Wiesbaden	Otto II (c. 1305–1350/1351); Count of Nassau-Siegen	Henry I (1307–1388); Count of Nassau-Beilstein ext. 1561
Adolph (1307–1370); Count of Nassau in Wiesbaden-Idstein ext 1605	John I (1309–1371); Count of Nassau-Weilburg	Rupert the Bellicose (c. 1340–1390); Count of Nassau-Sonnenberg	John I (c. 1339–1416); Count of Nassau-Siegen
Philip I (1368–1429); Count of Nassau in Weilburg, Saarbrücken, etc.	Adolf I (1362–1420); Count of Nassau-Siegen	John II "The Elder" (d. 1443)	Engelbert I (c. 1370/80–1442); Count of Nassau-Siegen, Baron of Breda founder of the Netherlands Nassaus	John III "The Younger" d. 1430; Count of Nassau-Siegen
Philip II (1418–1492); Count of Nassau-Weilburg	John II (1423–1472); Count of Nassau-Saarbrücken ext. 1574	John IV (1410–1475); Count of Nassau-Siegen	Henry II (1414–1451); Count of Nassau-Siegen
John III (1441–1480); Count of Nassau-Weilburg	Philip (1443–1471); Count of Nassau-Weilburg	Engelbert II the Valorious (1451–1504); Count of Nassau and Vianden, Baron of Breda(fr), Lek, Diest, Roosendaal en Nispen and Wouw	John V (1455–1516); Count of Nassau-Siegen
House of Nassau-Weilburg and the House of Luxembourg-Nassau	House of Orange-Nassau

=== House of Orange and Nassau ===
A summary family tree of the House of Orange-Nassau

From the joining of the house of Nassau-Breda/Dillenburg and the House of Chalon-Arlay-Orange to the end of the Dutch Republic is shown below. The family spawned many famous statesmen and generals, including two of the acknowledged "first captains of their age", Maurice of Nassau and the Marshal de Turenne.

John V Count of Nassau-Siegen; 1455–1516; Stadholder of Gelderland	John IV; Prince of Orange, 1475–1502
William the Rich; Count of Nassau-Siegen 1487- 1559	Henry III; Count of Nassau-Breda; 1483–1538	Claudia of Chalon; 1498–1521	Philibert of Chalon of Chalon; Prince of Orange; 1502–1530
William I "the Silent"; 1533–1584; Prince of Orange 1544; Stadholder of Holland, Zealand & Utrecht	Louis; 1538–1574	Adolf; 1540–1568	Henry; 1550–1574	John VI "the Elder"; 1536–1606; Stadholder of Gelderland	René of Chalon; 1519–1544; Prince of Orange r.1521
Philip William; 1554–1618; Prince of Orange r.1584	Maurice; 1567–1625; Prince of Orange r.1618 Stadholder of Holland, Zealand, Utrecht, etc.	Frederick Henry; 1584–1647; Prince of Orange r.1625 Stadtholder of Holland, Zeeland, & etc.	Louise Juliana; 1576–1644 married Frederick IV Elector Palatine from whom the British royal family descends	Elisabeth; 1577–1642 married Henri de La Tour d'Auvergne; Duke of Bouillon	(illeg.); Justinus van Nassau; 1559–1631; Admiral & General; Governor of Breda 1601–1625	William Louis "Us Heit"; Count of Nassau-Dillenburg; 1560–1620; Stadtholder of Friesland, Groningen, and Drenthe	Ernst Casimir; Count of Nassau-Dietz; 1573–1632; Stadtholder of Friesland, Groningen, and Drenthe	John VII "the Middle"; Count of Nassau-Siegen r.1561–1623
(illeg.); William of Nassau; 1601–1627; Lord of de Lek	(illeg.); Louis of Nassau; Lord of De Lek and Beverweerd; 1602–1665	Charles I King of England; 1630-1685	Elizabeth Stuart, Queen of Bohemia (1596–1662)	Frederick V Elector Palatine r.1610 King of Bohemia r.1619–1621	Henri de la Tour d'Auvergne; Vicomte de Turenne & Marshal-General of France; 1611–1675
James II; King of England	Mary; Princess Royal	William II; 1626–1650; Prince of Orange & Stadholder of Holland, Zealand, etc, r.1647	Louise Henriette; 1627–1667 married Frederick William, the Great Elector	(illeg.); Frederick Nassau de Zuylestein; 1608–1672 general of the army	Albertine Agnes; 1634–1696	William Frederick; 1613–1664; Count —later Prince— of Nassau-Dietz, Stadtholder of Friesland, Groningen and Drenthe	Henry Casimir I Count of Nassau-Dietz; 1612–1640; Stadtholder of Friesland, Groningen and Drenthe	John Maurice "the Brazilian"; Prince of Nassau-Siegen; 1604–1679; Governor of Dutch Brazil; Field Marshal of the Dutch Army
Mary II; Queen of England	William III; 1650–1702; Prince of Orange 1650; Stadholder of Holland, Zealand, etc, 1672; King of England, 1689	ceded claims to the lands of Orange to France in 1713 but kept right to use the title in its German form. Kings of Prussia and later German Emperors currently Georg Friedrich, Prince of Prussia, "Prinz von Oranien"	Earls of Rochford in England	Henry Casimir II; Prince of Nassau-Dietz; 1657–1696; Stadtholder of Friesland, Groningen and Drenthe
John William Friso; 1687–1711 appointed heir by William III; Prince of Orange r.1702 Stadholder of Frieslandr.1696
Anne; Princess Royal of England	William IV; 1711–1751; Prince of Orange; Stadholder of Holland, Zealand, etc. 1747
Wilhelmina of Prussia	William V 1748–1806; Prince of Orange r.1751 Stadholder of Holland, Zealand, etc. r.1751–1795	Carolina; 1743–1787	Charles Christian; Prince of Nassau-Weilburg r.1735–1788
Princess Louise of Orange-Nassau; 1770–1819 married Karl, Hereditary Prince of Braunschweig(-Wolfenbuttel)	Prince Frederick of Orange-Nassau; 1774–1799	William VI; 1772–1843; Fürst of Nassau-Orange-Fulda; 1803–1806; Fürst of Nassau-Orange; Prince of Orange r.1806 later William I King of the Netherlands r.1815	Frederick William; Prince of Nassau-Weilburg; 1768–1816
Royal Family of the Netherlands	William; Duke of Nassau; 1792–1839
Adolphe; 1817–1905; Duke of Nassau r.1839–1866 Grand Duke of Luxembourg r.1890–1905
House of Luxembourg-Nassau

==== Illegitimate lines ====
===== Family tree Nassau-den Lek =====
Family tree of the House of Nassau-den Lek

William I "the Silent" (1533–1584); Prince of Orange 1544, Stadholder of Holland, Zealand & Utrecht
Margaretha van Mechelen (c. 1580 – 1662)	Maurice of Nassau; Prince of Orange (1567–1625); Prince of Orange; 1618, Stadholder of Holland, Zealand, Utrecht, etc.
William of Nassau (1601–1627) "Chevalier de Nassau"; Lord of de Lek	Louis of Nassau (1602– 1665); Lord of De Lek and Beverweerd	Isabella van Hornes
Willem Jonker van Nassau (1620–1679)	Maurits Lodewijk van Nassau (1631–1683); Lord of den Lecq	William Adrian of Nassau (1632–1705); Lord of Odijk	Elisabeth of Nassau (1633–1718) married Henry Bennet, Earl of Arlington	Emilia (1635–1688) married Thomas Butler, 6th Earl of Ossory	Wilhelmina (c. 1638 – 1688) married Aelbert van Ruytenburgh	Henry of Nassau (1640– 1708); Lord of Ouwerkerk; Count of Nassau, 1679; Master of the Horse to William III of England
William of Nassau (1654-)	Barbara of Nassau (1659-)	Alida of Nassau (1661-)	John of Nassau (1663-)	Maurits Lodewijk of Nassau (1670–1740); Lord of den Lek	Lodewijk Adriaan of Nassau (1670–1742); Lord of Odijk	Elisabeth Wilhelmina of Nassau (1671–1729) married her cousin Maurits Lodewijk II van Nassau-LaLecq	Charlotte of Nassau (1677–1715) married her cousin Willem Maurits van Nassau-Ouwerkerk	Isabella of Nassau (1668–1692) married Charles Granville, Earl of Bath	Lodewijk van Nassau (1669–1687)	Lucia van Nassau (1671–1673)	Henry of Nassau (1673–1754); Earl of Grantham	Cornelis van Nassau (1675–1712); Lord of Woudenberg	Willem Maurits van Nassau (1679–1753); Lord of Ouwerkerk married his cousin Charlotte of Nassau	Frans van Nassau (1682–1710)	Lucia Anna van Nassau (1684–1744) married Nanfan Coote, Earl of Bellomont
Willem Hendrik van Nassau (1693–1762); Lord of Ouderkerk	Anna Isabella van Nassau; 1695–1765) married Mattheus Hoeufft Jr.	Hendrik Carel van Nassau (1696–1781); Lord of Beverweerd and Odijk	Lodewijk Theodoor van Nassau; 1701–1748)	Jan Nicolaas Floris van Nassau (1709–1782); Lord of Ouderkerk	Alida Cornelia van Nassau (1705-170?)	Willem Adriaan II van Nassau (1704–1759); Graaf van Nassau, Lord of Odijk, vrijheer van Bergen (1708)	Henry of Nassau (1697–1718); Viscount Boston; 1698	Thomas of Nassau (1700–1730); Viscount Boston; 1718	Frances of Nassau (1711–1772) married Captain (later Lieutenant-Colonel) William Elliot of Wells	Emilia Mary of Nassau (1702–1712)	Henrietta de Nassau (1712–1747) married William Clavering-Cowper, Earl Cowper	William Henry (1710–1735)	Elisabeth (1712-)	Francoise Henriette (1711-)
Catherina Elisabeth Wilhelmina van Nassau (1736–1777)	Lodewijk Theodoor II van Nassau (1741–1795); Lord of de Lek, Lord of Ouderkerk (1762–1773)	Jan Floris van Nassau (1751–1814); Lord of de Lek, Lord of Ouderkerk	Louise Suzanna van Nassau (1726–1803) married Frederik Christoffel, Graaf van Degenfeld-Schönburg (1721–1781)	Willem Lodewijk van Nassau (1727–1792); Vrijheer van Bergen	Wigbold Adriaan van Nassau (1729–1797); Lord of Odijk, etc. and Vrijheer van Bergen
Jan Floris Hendrik Carel van Nassau (1782–1824); Count of Nassau-la Lecq

===== Family Tree Nassau-Zuylestein =====
Family tree of the House of Nassau-Zuylestein

William I "the Silent" (1533–1584); Prince of Orange 1544; Stadholder of Holland, Zealand & Utrecht
Margaretha Catharina Bruyns (1595–1625)	Frederick Henry (1584–1647); Prince of Orange, 1625, Stadtholder of Holland, Zeeland, & etc.
Mary Killigrew (1627-) daughter of Sir William Killigrew	Frederick of Nassau (1624–1672); Lord of Zuylestein
Hendrik van Nassau (c. 1650–?1673); Heer van Leersum	William van Nassau (1649–1708); Earl of Rochford
Anna Nassau de Zuylestein (c. 1681–?1701)	William Nassau de Zuylestein (1682–1710); Earl of Rochford	Frederik Nassau de Zuylestein (1684–1738) heer van Zuylestein, Leersum en Waayenstein 1709–1738, Earl of Rochford,1710	Maurits van Nassau-Zuylestein (1685–1720); Colonel, English Army	Maria van Nassau-Zuylestein (1687–1765) married baron Godard Adriaan van Reede (16xx–?1730) heer van Herreveld and Earl of Athlone, son of Godard van Reede heer van Ginckel (1644–1703)	Elizabeth van Nassau-Zuylestein (1688–?c. 1720)	Henriette (1688–1759) married Frederik Christiaan van Reede, baron van Reede, Earl of Athlone	Frederik Hendrik (Henry) van Nassau-Zuylestein (1692?–?1740)
William Nassau de Zuylestein (1717–1781); Earl of Rochford; British courtier, diplomat and statesman illeg. desc.	Richard Savage Nassau de Zuylestein (1723–1780); Member of Parliament, 1747–1754, 1774–1780
Mary (1762/3-1850)	Frederick Nassau (1771–1857); Master of St. Osyth Priory	Ann (1773/4-1848)	William Henry Nassau (1754–1830); Earl of Rochford	George Richard Savage Nassau (1758–1823) bibliophile	Lucy Nassau (1752–1830)
William Frederick Nassau (1798–1857); Master of St. Osyth Priory	Ann Nassau (1800–1868)	John Augustus Nassau (1806–?)
Elizabeth Catherina Nassau (1827–1926); Mistress of St. Osyth Priory married John Roberts Kirby	Eliza Nassau (1833–1912)	Rochford Augustus Nassau (1853–1902)
Letta Mary Nassau (1884–+young)	Frederik "Frank" Rochford Nassau (1889–1959)	Herbert Arthur Nassau (1892–1932)	Harold Charles Nassau (1894–1895)	Nellie Nassau (?-+young)	Ethel Violet Nassau (1896–?) married Frederick Savage
Doris Elsie Nassau (1915–1952) married Stanley Philip Painter	Frederik (Freddie) Herbert Nassau (1919–1990) one daughter	Herbert John Nassau (1920–1969) 2 daughters

===== Family Tree Nassau-Grimhuizen =====
Family tree of the House of Nassau-Grimhuizen

William I "the Silent" (1533–1584), Prince of Orange 1544, Stadholder of Holland, Zealand & Utrecht	Eva Elincx
Justinus van Nassau (1559–1631); Admiral & General, Governor of Breda 1601–1625	Anne, Baronesse de Mérode (1567–1634)
William (1603–1638) jonker van Nassau, heer van Grimhuizen	Louise Henriëtte van Nassau (1604 – bet 1637/45) married Henry Philip Herbert lt. col. in Dutch Army, 1 son, Philips Henry Herbert (1634–1657)	Philips van Nassau (1605 – between 1672/1676) jonker van Nassau, heer van Grimhuizen, Hoekelom en Wijchen
Justinus II van Nassau (1633–1658); Jonker van Nassau heer van Grimhuizen	Justina van Nassau (1635–1721) married George van Cats (1632 – na 1676) heer van Cats, Coulster en Schagen	Anna Justina van Nassau (1638–1721) married Willem Adriaan II van Horne graaf van Horne, baron van Kessel en heer van Batenburg	Philips van Nassau died young	Anna Margaretha van Nassau (1634–1676) married (1) Diederik Schenk van Nydeggen heer van Blijenbeek, Afferden en Grubbenvorst married (2) Johan Gerard van Oostrum heer van Moersbergen, Cattenbroek en Zeist, col in Dutch Army, 2 daughters.

=== House of Nassau-Dillenburg ===
Family tree of the House of Nassau-Dillenburg

Compiled from Wikipedia and:

Johann VI "the Old/de Oude" (1536–1606); Count of Nassau-Dillenburg, 1559, Stadholder of Gelderland r.1578–1581
Willem Lodewijk of Nassau "Us Heit" (1560–1620); Count of Nassau-Dillenburg, 1606 stadholder of Friesland and Groningen(1584–1620) married his cousin Anna van Nassau(1563–1588) d. of William the Silent	John VII "the Middle/de Middelste" of Nassau-Siegen (1561–1623); Count of Nassau-(in) Siegen r.1606	George "the Old/de Oude" of Nassau-Dillenburg (1562–1623); Count of Nassau-(in) Dillenburg r.1606	Philip of Nassau (1566–1595); Dutch States Army officer	Ernest Casimir I (1573–1632); Count of Nassau-(in) Dietz r.1606 stadholder of Friesland (1620–1632)	Louis Gunther of Nassau (1575–1604); Dutch States Army officer	John Louis of Nassau-Hadamar (1590–1653); Count later Prince (1650) of Nassau-(in) Hadamar r.1606	Anne Joanne (1594–1654) married John Wolfert van Brederode, Field marshal Dutch States Army
John Ernst of Nassau (1582–1617); Venetian General	John VIII or II "the Younger/de Jongste" of Nassau-Siegen (1583–1638); Count of Nassau-(in)(South) Siegen r.1623–1632, 1638 South (catholic) Siegen	Adolf (1586–1608); Dutch States Army officer	William of Nassau (1592–1642); Count of Nassau-(in)Siegen; Dutch States Army officer	John Maurice of Nassau-Siegen (1604–1679) de facto Count and later Prince (1664) of Nassau-(in) (North/protestant) Siegen r.1632 (all Siegen), 1638 North (protestant) Siegen; Field marshal Dutch States Army commander 1664–1668; Governor of Dutch Brazil	George Frederick of Nassau-Siegen (1606–1674) married Mauritia Eleonora of Portugal, daughter of Emilia of Nassau, daughter of William the Silent and daughter-in-law of António, Prior of Crato; Dutch States Army officer	William Otto (1607–1641)	Sophie Margarete of Nassau (1610–1665) married 1656 Count Georg Ernst of Limburg Stirum	Henry of Nassau-Siegen (1611–1652); Dutch States Army officer	Christian (1616–1644)	John Ernest (1618–1639)	John Philip of Nassau-Dillenburg (1590–1607)	George II "the Younger/de Jonge" of Nassau-Dillenburg (1591–1616)	Louis Henry of Nassau-Dillenburg (1594–1662); Count later Prince (1654) of Nassau-(in) Dillenburg jointly with Albert from 1623–1626, alone from 1626	Albert of Nassau-Dillenburg (1596–1626) ruled Nassau-Dillenburg with Louis Henry,1623–1626	Maurice Henry of Nassau-Hadamar (1626–1679); Prince of Nassau-(in) Hadamar
John Francis Desideratus of Nassau-Siegen (1627–1699); Count and Prince (1652) of Nassau-(in)(South) Siegen r.1638 Spanish General and Stadholder	Maurice Frederick of Nassau-Siegen (1621–1638); Dutch States Army officer killed in battle of Kallo	William Maurice of Nassau-Siegen (1649–1691); Count and later Prince (1664) of Nassau-(in) (North/protestant) Siegen r.1679 Dutch States Army officer	Frederick Henry of Nassau-Siegen of Nassau-Siegen (1651–1676); Dutch States Army officer	George Louis of Nassau-Dillenburg (1618–1656); Hereditary Prince of Nassau-Dillenburg	Adolph of Nassau-Dillenburg (1629–1676); Prince of Nassau-(in) Schaumburg r.1662	Francis Alexander of Nassau-Hadamar (1674–1711)
Francis Fortunatus of Nassau (1666–1672)	William Hyacinth of Nassau-Siegen (1667–1743); Prince of Nassau-(in)(South) Siegen r.1699 claimed Principality of Orange principality inherited by Nassau-Deitz (William IV, Prince of Orange), who reunited all of Ottonian Nassau	Hermann (1667–1672) twin with William Hyacinth	(Morganatic?); Alexis Anton Christian Ferdinand of Nassau-Siegen (1673–1734) titulair aartsbisschop van Trapezopolis	(Morganatic?); Francis Hugo Ferdinand Gereon of Nassau-Siegen (1678–1735); Vice-Regent of Nassau-Siegen (1727)	(Morganatic?); Emmanuel Ignatius of Nassau-Siegen (1688–1735); Baron de Renaix (1699), Prince-Regent of Nassau-Siegen, (1727), Fieldmarshal of the Spanish Army, Knight of the Order of Malta (1697), Knight of the Order of the Golden Fleece (1715), Knight of the Order of St. Hubertus (1720)	Frederick William Adolf of Nassau-Siegen (1680–1722); Prince of Nassau-(in) (North/protestant) Siegen r.1691 Dutch States Army officer	Charles Louis Henry of Nassau-Siegen (1682–1694)	Henry of Nassau-Dillenburg (1641–1701); Prince of Nassau-(in) Dillenburg r.1662 inherited Nassau part of Shaumburg
Francis Joseph (1689–1703)	(?); Maximilian William Adolph of Nassau-Siegen (1722–1728)	Frederick William II of Nassau-Siegen (1706–1734); Prince of Nassau-(in) (North/protestant) Siegen r.1722 no heirs, principality inherited by William Hyacinth, Prince of Nassau-Siegen	William II of Nassau-Dillenburg (1670–1724); Prince of Nassau-(in) Dillenburg r.1701 inherited part of Hadamar 1711	Christian of Nassau-Dillenburg (1688–1739); Prince of Nassau-(in) Dillenburg r.1724 married Isabella of Nassau-Dietz, d of Henry Casimir II of Nassau-Dietz; Dillenburg divided between William IV, Prince of Orange (Nassau-Dietz) and William Hyacinth of Nassau-Siegen
Charles Henry of Nassau-Siegen (1743–1808); Russian Admiral	Henry Augustus William of Nassau-Dillenburg (1700–1718)

=== House of Nassau-Weilburg ===
Family tree of the House of Nassau-Weilburg

Compiled from Wikipedia and these references.

For ancestors of the House of Nassau-Weilburg, see House of Nassau#Family Tree

John III (1441–1480); Count of Nassau-Weilburg
Louis I (1473–1523); Count of Nassau-Weilburg
Philip III (1504–1559); Count of Nassau-Weilburg
Albert (1537–1593); Count of Nassau-Weilburg	Philip IV (1542–1602); Count of Nassau-Weilburg in Saarbrucken
Louis II (1565–1627); Count of Nassau-Weilburg in Ottweiler	William (1570–1597); Count of Nassau-Weilburg in Weilburg	John Casimir (1577–1602); Count of Nassau-Weilburg in Gleiberg
William Louis (1590–1640); Count of Nassau-Saarbrücken	John (1603–1677); Count of Nassau-Idstein Counts of Nassau-Idstein ext.1721	Ernest Casimir (1607–1655); Count of Nassau-Weilburg
John Louis (1625–1690); Count of Nassau-Ottweiler ext. 1728	Gustav Adolph (1632–1677); Count of Nassau-Saarbrücken ext. 1723	Walrad (1635–1702); Count & Prince of Nassau-Usingen ext. 1816	Frederick (1640–1675); Count of Nassau-Weilburg
John Ernst (1664–1719); Count & Prince of Nassau-Weilburg
Charles August (1685–1753); Prince of Nassau-Weilburg	Charles Ernst (1689–1709); Prince of Nassau-Weilburg
Princess Carolina of Orange-Nassau (1743–1787)	Charles Christian (1735–1788); Prince of Nassau-Weilburg
Frederick William (1768–1816); Prince of Nassau-Weilburg
William (1792–1839); Duke of Nassau
William (1792–1839); Duke of Nassau
Adolphe (1817–1905) Grand Duke of Luxembourg r. 1890–1905
William IV (1852–1912) Grand Duke of Luxembourg r. 1905–1912
Marie-Adélaïde (1894–1924) Grand Duchess of Luxembourg r. 1912–1919	Charlotte (1896–1985) Grand Duchess of Luxembourg r. 1919–1964
House of Luxembourg-Nassau

=== House of Luxembourg-Nassau ===
Family tree of the House of Luxembourg-Nassau

Adolphe (1817–1905); Duke of Nassau r. 1839–1866; Grand Duke of Luxembourg r. 1890–1905	Adelheid-Marie; Princess of Anhalt-Dessau
William IV (1852–1912); Grand Duke of Luxembourg r. 1905–1912	Marie Anne; Infanta of Portugal
Marie-Adélaïde (1894–1924); Grand Duchess of Luxembourg r. 1912–1919	Charlotte (1896–1985); Grand Duchess of Luxembourg r. 1919–1964	Felix; Prince of Bourbon-Parma
Jean (1921–2019); Grand Duke of Luxembourg r. 1964–2000	Joséphine-Charlotte; Princess of Belgium	Charles; Prince of Luxembourg
Marie-Astrid; Archduchess of Austria	Henri (1955–present); Grand Duke of Luxembourg r. 2000–2025	Maria Teresa Mestre	Jean; Prince of Luxembourg	Margaretha; Princess of Liechtenstein	Guillaume; Prince of Luxembourg
Guillaume V (1981–present); Grand Duke of Luxembourg r. 2025–present	Stéphanie; Countess de Lannoy	Félix; Prince of Luxembourg	Louis; Prince of Luxembourg	Alexandra; Princess of Luxembourg	Sébastien; Prince of Luxembourg
Charles; Prince of Luxembourg	François; Prince of Luxembourg

== See also ==
- Kings of Germany family tree

== Sources ==
- Genealogy of the Middle Ages – House of Nassau
- Nassau-info.de
- Titles of Counts, Princes, and Dukes of Nassau
- Hay, Mark Edward, 'The House of Nassau between France and Independence, 1795–1814: Lesser Powers, Strategies of Conflict Resolution, Dynastic Networks', The International History Review, 38/3 (2016), 482–504
