= Rupert II of Laurenburg =

Count of Laurenburg (died c. 1159)

Rupert II, Count of Laurenburg
- Born: Unknown
- Died: c. 1159
- Noble family: House of Nassau
- Spouse: ?
- Issue: Henry I, Count of Nassau; Walram I, Count of Nassau
- Father: Rupert I of Laurenburg
- Mother: Beatrix of Limburg

Rupert II of Laurenburg, German: Ruprecht II. von Laurenburg (died c. 1159) was count of Laurenburg and one of the ancestors of the House of Nassau.

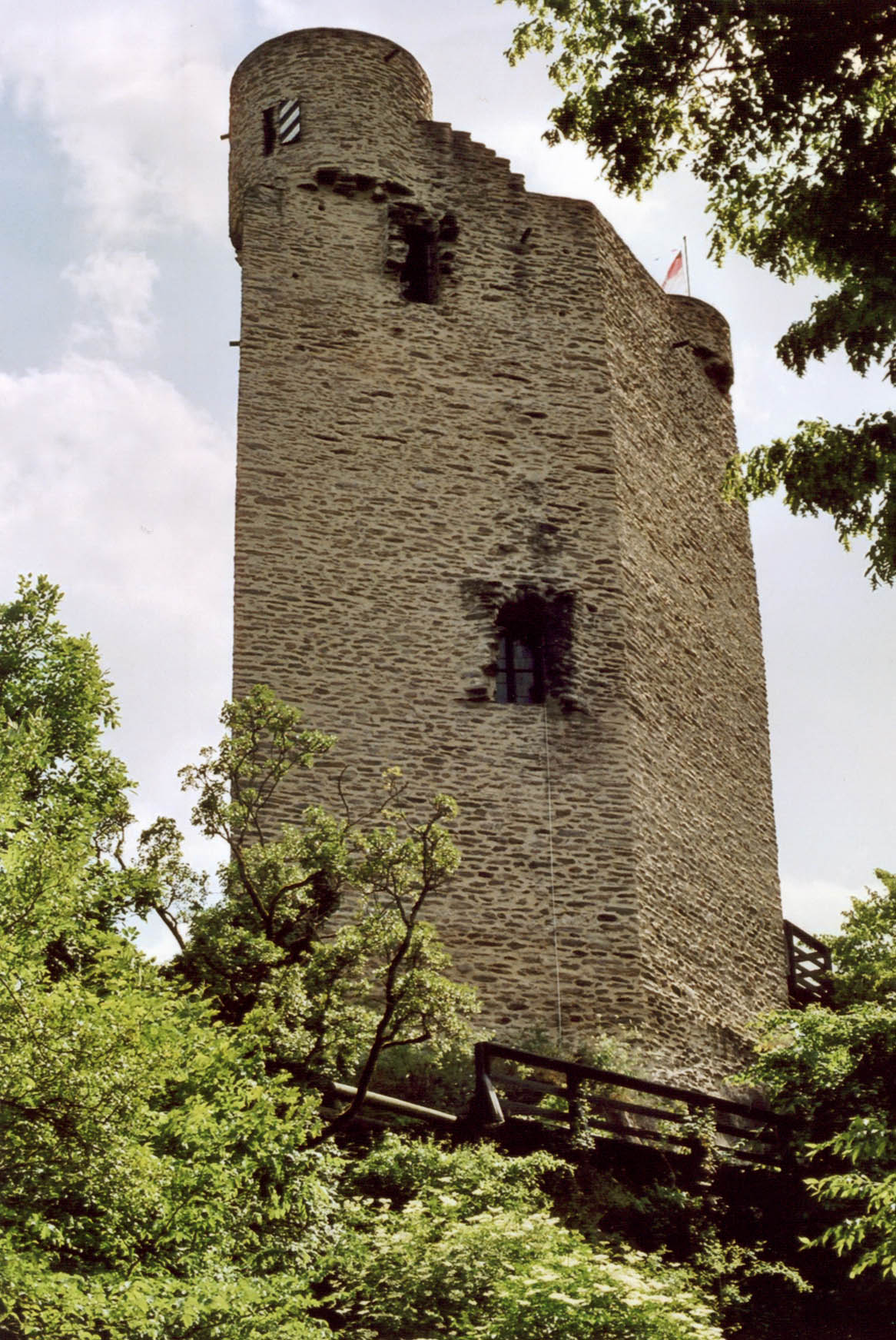
Laurenburg Castle

Rupert was a son of count Rupert I of Laurenburg and Beatrix of Limburg, a daughter of Walram II the Pagan, Count of Limburg and Duke of Lower Lorraine, and Jutta of Guelders (daughter of count Gerard I of Guelders).

Rupert is mentioned as count of Laurenburg between 1154 and 1158. He ruled together with his brother Arnold II. Rupert and Arnold were, together with their mother, last mentioned in a charter dated 1 April 1158.

== Uncertainty about wife and children ==
Due to the lack of data, there is much unknown about the early counts of Laurenburg and Nassau, including the exact family relationships. Maybe the wife of Rupert was also called Beatrix, but no marriage has been mentioned of him. As the uncle of count Rupert III of Nassau, Rupert II could very well have been the father of count Walram I of Nassau, who then, as cousin, succeeded count Herman of Nassau, the son of Rupert III.

== Sources ==
- This article was translated from the corresponding Dutch Wikipedia article, as of 2018-08-25.
- Dek, A.W.E. (1970). Genealogie van het Vorstenhuis Nassau [Genealogy of the Royal House of Nassau] (in Dutch). Zaltbommel: Europese Bibliotheek. OCLC 27365371.
- Hesselfelt, H.F.J. (1965). "De oudste generaties van het Huis Nassau" [The oldest generations of the House of Nassau]. De Nederlandsche Leeuw, Maandblad van het Koninklijk Nederlandsch Genootschap voor Geslacht- en Wapenkunde [The Dutch Lion, Monthly Journal of the Royal Dutch Society for Genealogy and Heraldry] (in Dutch). 1965 (11): 354–365.
- Venne, J.M. van de; Stols, Alexander A.M. (1937). Geslachts-Register van het Vorstenhuis Nassau [Genealogy of the Royal House of Nassau] (in Dutch). Maastricht: A. A. M. Stols' Uitgevers-Maatschappij.

German nobility
Preceded by Rupert I	co-Count of Laurenburg (with Arnold II); 1154–1158	Succeeded by Henry I
