= Walram I of Nassau =

German noble (1176–1198)

Walram I, Count of Nassau
- Born: c. 1146
- Died: 1 February 1198 (aged 51–52)
- Noble family: House of Nassau
- Spouse: Kunigunde
- Issue: Henry II ‘the Rich’; Rupert IV; Beatrix
- Father: Rupert II of Laurenburg
- Mother: ?

Walram I of Nassau, German: Walram I. von Nassau (c. 1146 – 1 February 1198), also known as Walram I of Laurenburg, was Count of Nassau and is the oldest Nassau whose ancestorship is absolutely certain. He managed to expand his territory considerably during his reign. He took part in the Third Crusade.

== Biography ==
=== Early life ===
Coat-of-arms of the counts of Nassau

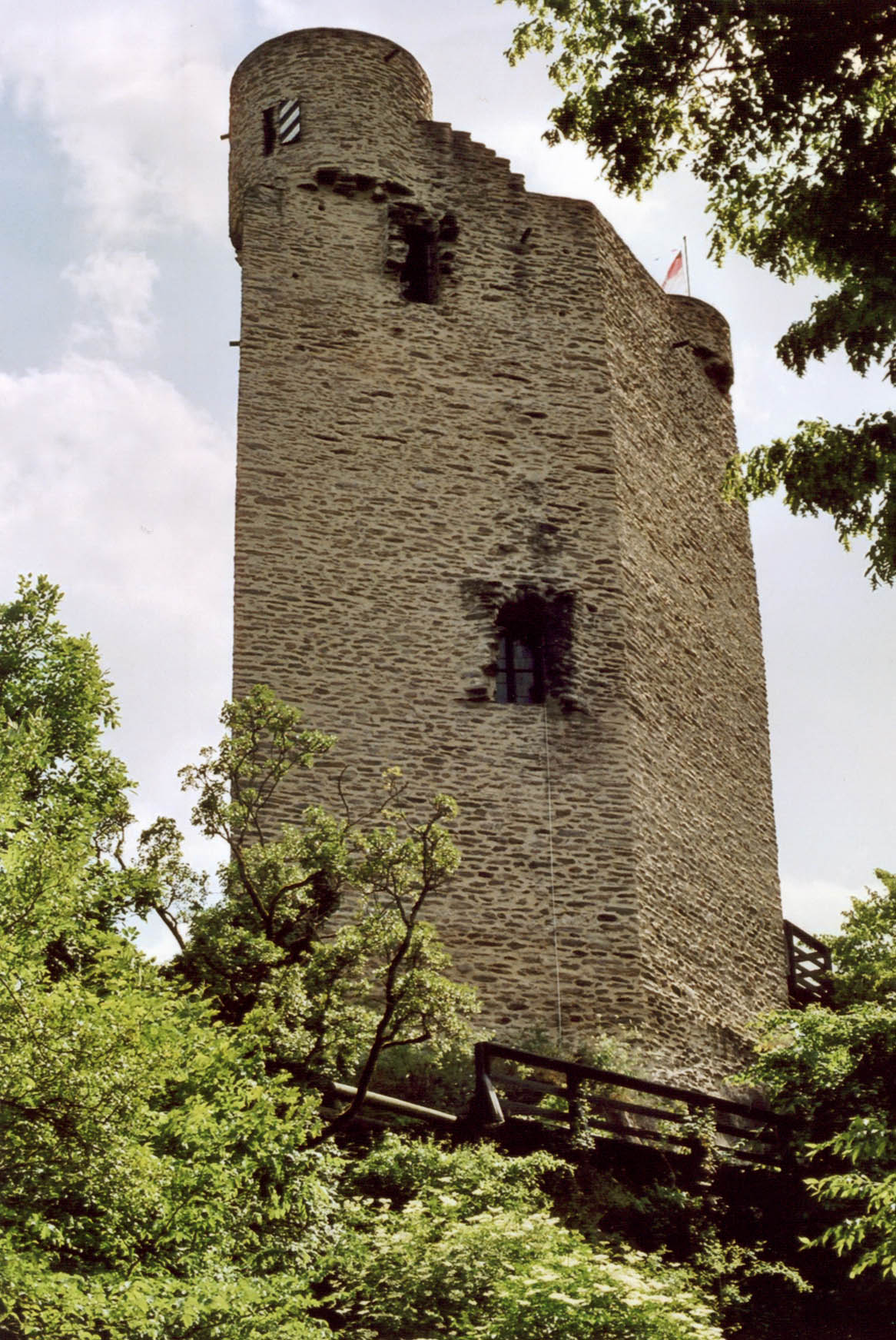
Laurenburg Castle

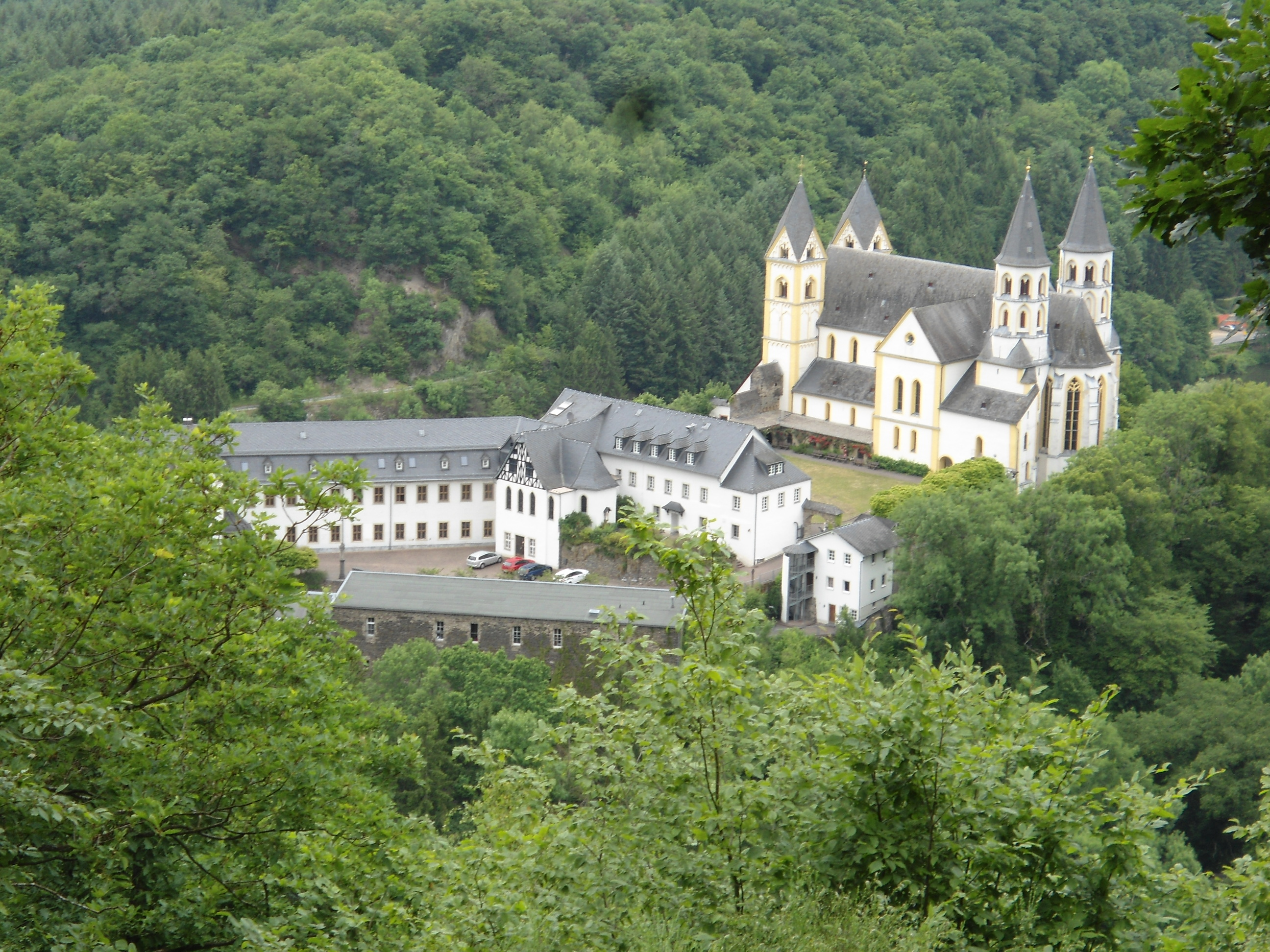
Arnstein Abbey

Walram was probably a son of Rupert II, Count of Laurenburg and an unknown woman. Possibly his mother was called Beatrix, it is uncertain whether that mention should not have been 'grandmother' (namely Beatrix of Limburg, daughter of Walram II 'the Pagan', Count of Limburg and Duke of Lower Lorraine and Jutta of Guelders (daughter of Gerard I, Count of Guelders).

Walram is mentioned between 1176 and 1191 as Count of Laurenburg and then, from 1193, as Count of Nassau. He seems to have had his residence at the Castle of Laurenburg first, which is why he used the title Count of Laurenburg, even when the name Nassau was already in use for a while in his house. In 1198, his widow still used the seal of Walram of Laurenburg. Walram ruled with his cousin Rupert III, and later with his son Herman, whom he eventually succeeded.

=== Territorial expansion ===
Walram acquired the Herborner Mark, the Kalenberger Zent (including Mengerskirchen, Beilstein and Nenderoth, the second two now being parts of Greifenstein), and the Gericht Heimau (including Driedorf and Löhnberg) as a fief from the Landgraviate of Thüringen. In this way, Walram was able to make a connection between the family possessions the Vogtship of Weilburg (with its numerous property and lordship rights in the Westerwald and Dill River region), the castles of Laurenburg and Nassau on the River Lahn, and the Vogtship in the Siegerland (the region around the city of Siegen). The same period may also have brought the Lordship of the Westerwald (including Marienberg, Neukirch, and Emmerichenhain, now part of Rennerod). Walram also bought the Vogtships of Koblenz and Ems.

To the south of his possessions, Walram took over partial rule of the Einrichgau, later-named the Vierherrengericht (Four Lords' Jurisdiction), with its main town of Marienfels. This had been part of the former Countship of Arnstein. The last Count of Arnstein, Louis III, had no heir and had converted his castle of Arnstein into a monastery, Arnstein Abbey, near present-day Obernhof, about 4 kilometers (2.5 mi) east of Nassau. On entering the monastery himself in 1139/1140, he had transferred control of Marienfels to his cousin Reginbold of Isenburg. In 1160, Reginbold sold it jointly to his cousins, the Counts of Nassau and Katzenelnbogen. The Nassau Counts were able to claim part of the inheritance through the marriage of their ancestor Dudo of Laurenburg with one of the seven daughters of Count Louis I of Arnstein.

Walram became affiliated with Holy Roman Emperor Frederick I Barbarrossa in the Peace of the Rhine Country in 1179. He placed his lands under the immediate suzerainty of the German king, rather than remaining a vassal of the archbishop of Trier. He would remain a loyal supporter of the Hohenstaufen Emperors. Walram's close ties with the imperial house were rewarded with Königshof Wiesbaden. (Note: The article about Walram's son Rupert IV states that ‘Walram I had received the Königshof Wiesbaden from Emperor Frederick I in reward for his support of the emperor in the conflicts of 1170-1180.’ In the article about Sonnenberg Castle on the German Wikipedia, however, it is stated: ‘Die Nassauer waren von Friedrich I. wahrscheinlich als Dank für Ihre Unterstützung in den Römerzügen 1154 mit dem Königshof Wiesbaden belehnt worden.’ (The Nassaus presumably received the Königshof Wiesbaden as a fief from Frederick I as a thank you for their support in his first Italian campaigns of 1154.)) At about the same time, he also received possession of the game rights in the forests of the Rheingau (a fief of the Archbishopric of Mainz), so that his rule extended over the Taunus, south to the Middle Rhine.

Walram had ongoing feuds with the neighboring houses of Eppstein, Solms, and Katzenelnbogen.

=== Third Crusade ===
With his cousin Rupert III, Walram went to the Third Crusade (1189–1190). Walram probably took up the cross with the emperor on the Hoftag at Mainz on 27 March 1188. He was assigned an important task at the start of the journey. Together with his cousin Rupert and Count Henry of Diez, he formed the accompaniment of Bishop Herman II of Münster, who was envoy to Byzantine Emperor Isaac II Angelos in the fall of 1188. The delegation did arrive in Constantinople, but initially snubbed and then actually held as hostages by the Byzantine Emperor. They were set free as the crusade army approached. On 28 October 1189, Rupert and his companions rejoined the crusade army at Philippopolis. From that day, he disappears from the crusade army. The assumption that he was present at the formation of the Teutonic Order in Acre is, as far is known about its course, untenable. Nor is there sufficient evidence that at that time, contrary to his crusade vow, he left the crusade army. It is certain that in 1190, before the news of the death of the emperor arrived in Germany, Walram was a witness in a charter drawn up in Cologne by Archbishop Philip I of Cologne.

=== Subsequent years ===
Little is known about the subsequent years of Walram. He is sometimes mentioned as a witness, also in imperial charters, but in general he seems to be far from the emperor and not to have participated in his military activities. On 6 November 1195, after the mediation and approval of Emperor Henry VI, Walram concluded with Bishop Henry I of Worms the important treaty for his house in which the mutual rights - the lordship rights of the bishop and the vogtship rights of the count - to the castle, the city and the lordship Weilburg were established. Castle and lordship Weilburg appear here for the first time as the property of the House of Nassau. In the years following the treaty of 6 November 1195, Walram appears to have stayed at the imperial court, where he participated in the Reichstag of Worms, at which the emperor negotiated a new crusade. It is certain that Walram did not participate in the German army in 1197, several mentionings as witness in charters prove that he did not leave the country.

Walram I died on 1 February 1198. He is buried in Arnstein Abbey. He was succeeded by his sons Henry II and Rupert IV.

== Marriage and children ==
Walram married a certain Kunigunde (died 8 November in or after 1198, last mentioned on 20 March 1198), possibly a daughter of a count of Sponheim or a daughter of count Poppo II of Ziegenhain. From this union came three children:

1. Henry II 'the Rich' (c. 1180 – 26 April 1247/48/49/50), Count of Nassau (1198–1247).
2. Rupert IV (died after 1 January 1239), Count of Nassau (1198–1230) and Teutonic Knight (since 1230).
3. Beatrix, mentioned in 1222 as a nun in Affolderbach Abbey near Nastätten.

== Sources ==
- Becker, E. (1983) [1950]. Schloss und Stadt Dillenburg. Ein Gang durch ihre Geschichte in Mittelalter und Neuzeit. Zur Gedenkfeier aus Anlaß der Verleihung der Stadtrechte am 20. September 1344 herausgegeben [Castle and City Dillenburg: A Journey through their History in Medieval and Modern Times. Published to celebrate the granting of Town Privileges on 20 September 1344] (in German) (2nd ed.). Dillenburg: Der Magistrat der Stadt Dillenburg.
- Dek, A.W.E. (1970). Genealogie van het Vorstenhuis Nassau [Genealogy of the Royal House of Nassau] (in Dutch). Zaltbommel: Europese Bibliotheek. OCLC 27365371.
- Hesselfelt, H.F.J. (1965). "De oudste generaties van het Huis Nassau" [The oldest generations of the House of Nassau]. De Nederlandsche Leeuw, Maandblad van het Koninklijk Nederlandsch Genootschap voor Geslacht- en Wapenkunde [The Dutch Lion, Monthly Journal of the Royal Dutch Society for Genealogy and Heraldry] (in Dutch). 1965 (11): 354–365.
- Huberty, Michel; Giraud, Alain; Magdelaine, F. & B. (1981). l'Allemagne Dynastique. Tome III: Brunswick-Nassau-Schwarzbourg [German Dynasties. Volume III: Brunswick-Nassau-Schwarzburg] (in French). Le Perreux: Alain Giraud.
- Lück, Alfred (1981) [1967]. Siegerland und Nederland [Siegerland and The Netherlands] (in German) (2nd ed.). Siegen: Siegerländer Heimatverein e.V.
- Sauer, Wilhelm (1896). "Graf Walram I. von Nassau" [Count Walram I of Nassau]. Allgemeine Deutsche Biographie [Universal German Biography] (in German). Vol. Band 40. Leipzig: Duncker & Humblot. pp. 776–778.
- Schwennicke, Detlev (1998). Europäische Stammtafeln, Neue Folge [European Genealogies, New Series] (in German). Vol. Band I. Frankfurt am Main: Vittorio Klostermann GmbH. ISBN 3-465-02743-4. Table 60.
- Setton, Kenneth M.; Hazard, Harry W.; Wolff, Robert Lee; Zacour, Norman P.; Whithed Baldwin, Marshall (2005) [1969]. A History of the Crusades: The Later Crusades, 1189-1311. Madison: University of Wisconsin Press. ISBN 978-0-299-04844-0.
- Thiele, Andreas (1994). Erzählende genealogische Stammtafeln zur europäischen Geschichte, Band I, Teilband 2: Deutsche Kaiser-, Königs-, Herzogs- und Grafenhäuser II [Annotated genealogies from European History, Volume 1, Part 2: German Imperial, Royal, Ducal and Comital Houses II] (in German) (2nd ed.). Frankfurt am Main: RG Fischer Verlag. ISBN 3-89501-023-5.
- Venne, J.M. van de; Stols, Alexander A.M. (1937). Geslachts-Register van het Vorstenhuis Nassau [Genealogy of the Royal House of Nassau] (in Dutch). Maastricht: A.A.M. Stols’ Uitgevers-Maatschappij.
- Vorsterman van Oyen, A.A. (1882). Het vorstenhuis Oranje-Nassau. Van de vroegste tijden tot heden [The Royal House of Orange-Nassau. From the earliest days until the present] (in Dutch). Leiden & Utrecht: A.W. Sijthoff & J.L. Beijers.

German nobility
Preceded by Henry I	co-Count of Nassau (with Rupert III and Herman); 1176–1198	Succeeded by Henry II and Rupert IV
