= Duchess of Limburg =

== Countess of Limburg ==
=== House of Ardennes, 1065–1119 ===
Picture	Name	Father	Birth	Marriage	Became Countess	Ceased to be Countess	Death	Spouse
	Jutta of Lower Lorraine	Frederick of Luxembourg, Duke of Lower Lorraine (Elder Luxembourg)	1050	1065	1065 husband's accession	1082 husband's death	1102	Waleran I
	Adelaide of Podenstein	Botho, Count of Pottenstein	1061	-	1082 husband's accession	after 13 August 1106		Henry I

=== House of Ardennes, 1119–1283 ===
Picture	Name	Father	Birth	Marriage	Became Duchess	Ceased to be Duchess	Death	Spouse
	Judith of Guelders, heiress of Wassenberg	Gerard I, Count of Guelders (Dampierre)	1087	1107/10	1119 husband's ascession	16 July 1139 husband's death	24 June 1151	Waleran II
	Matilda of Saffenberg	Adolf, Count of Saffenberg (Saffenberg)	1113	1136	16 July 1139 husband's ascession	2 January 1145		Henry II
	Laurette of Flanders	Thierry, Count of Flanders (Metz)	1130	1150		before 1152 divorce	1175	Henry II
	Sophia of Saarbrücken	Simon I, Count of Saarbrücken (Saarbrücken)	1149	1165	19 August 1167 husband's ascession	1215		Henry III
	Ermesinde of Namur, Countess of Luxembourg	Henry IV, Count of Luxembourg and Namur (Namur)	June 1186	May 1214	21 June 1221 husband's ascession	2 July 1226 husband's death	12 February 1247	Waleran III
	Ermengard of Berg	Adolf VI, Count of Berg (Berg)	-	1217/8	2 July 1226 husband's ascession	25 February 1247 husband's death	1248/9	Henry IV
	Judith of Cleves	Dietrich V, Count of Cleves (Cleves)	-	-	25 February 1247 husband's ascession	before 1278		Waleran IV
	Kunigunde of Brandenburg	Otto, Margrave of Brandenburg (Ascania)	-	10 January 1278		1279 husband's death	after 8 June 1292	Waleran IV

- Interregnum (1283–1288)

=== House of Leuven, 1288–1406 ===
Picture	Name	Father	Birth	Marriage	Became Duchess	Ceased to be Duchess	Death	Spouse
	Margaret of Flanders	Guy of Dampierre, Count of Flanders (Dampierre)	1251	1273	5 June 1288; Battle of Worringen	3 July 1285		John I
	Margaret of England	Edward I of England (Plantagenet)	15 March 1275	8 July 1290	3 May 1294 husband's ascession	27 October 1312 husband's death	after 11 March 1333	John II
	Marie d'Évreux	Louis of France, Count d'Évreux (Évreux)	1303	19 July 1311	27 October 1312 husband's ascession	31 October 1335		John III
	Joanna, Duchess of Brabant (suo jure)	John III, Duke of Brabant (Reginar)	24 June 1322	1334	5 December 1355 father's death	1 November 1406		William IV

=== House of Valois, 1406–1482 ===
Picture	Name	Father	Birth	Marriage	Became Duchess	Ceased to be Duchess	Death	Spouse
	Jeanne of Saint Pol	Waleran III of Luxembourg, Count of Ligny and Saint Pol (Luxembourg)	1380/85	21 February 1402	1 November 1406 husband's accession	12 August 1407		Anthony
	Elisabeth, Duchess of Luxembourg	John of Görlitz (Luxembourg)	November 1390	16 July 1409		25 October 1415 husband's death	3 August 1451	Anthony
	Jacqueline, Countess of Hainaut	William II, Duke of Bavaria (Wittelsbach)	16 August 1401	18 April 1418		7 March 1422 obtained papal divorce	8 October 1436	John IV
-	Margaret	?	?	?	17 April 1427 husband's accession	14 August 1430 husband's death	?	Philip I
	Isabella of Portugal	John I of Portugal (Aviz)	21 February 1397	7 January 1430		15 July 1467 husband's death	17 December 1471	Philip II
	Margaret of York	Richard Plantagenet, 3rd Duke of York (York)	3 May 1446	9 July 1468		5 January 1477 husband's death	23 November 1503	Charles I
	Mary of Burgundy (suo jure)	Charles I (Valois-Burgundy)	13 February 1457	18 August 1477	5 January 1477 father's death	23 November 1503		Maximilian I

=== House of Habsburg, 1482–1700 ===
Picture	Name	Father	Birth	Marriage	Became Duchess	Ceased to be Duchess	Death	Spouse
	Joanna of Castile	Ferdinand II of Aragon (Trastámara)	6 November 1479	20 October 1496		25 September 1506 husband's death	12 April 1555	Philip III
	Isabella of Portugal	Manuel I of Portugal (Aviz)	24 October 1503	11 March 1526		1 May 1539		Charles II
	Mary I of England	Henry VIII of England (Tudor)	18 February 1516	25 July 1554	16 January 1556 husband's ascension	17 November 1558		Philip IV
	Elisabeth of Valois	Henry II of France (Valois)	2 April 1545	22 June 1559		3 October 1568		Philip IV
	Anna of Austria	Maximilian II, Holy Roman Emperor (Habsburg)	1 November 1549	4 May 1570		26 October 1580		Philip IV
	Elisabeth of Bourbon	Henry IV of France (Bourbon)	22 November 1602	25 November 1615	31 March 1621 husband's ascension	6 October 1644		Philip V
	Mariana of Austria	Ferdinand III, Holy Roman Emperor (Habsburg)	24 December 1634	7 October 1649		17 September 1665 husband's death	16 May 1696	Philip V
	Marie Louise of Orléans	Philippe I, Duke of Orléans (Bourbon-Orléans)	26 March 1662	19 November 1679		12 February 1689		Charles III
	Maria Anna of the Palatinate-Neuburg	Philip William, Elector Palatine (Wittelsbach)	28 October 1667	14 May 1690		1 November 1700 husband's death	16 July 1740	Charles III

=== House of Bourbon, 1700–1706 ===
Picture	Name	Father	Birth	Marriage	Became Duchess	Ceased to be Duchess	Death	Spouse
	Maria Luisa of Savoy	Victor Amadeus II of Sardinia (Savoy)	17 September 1688	2 November 1701		c. 1706; Duchy ceded to Austria	14 February 1714	Philip VI

=== House of Habsburg, 1706–1780 ===
Picture	Name	Father	Birth	Marriage	Became Duchess	Ceased to be Duchess	Death	Spouse
	Elisabeth Christine of Brunswick-Wolfenbüttel	Louis Rudolph, Duke of Brunswick-Lüneburg (Welf)	28 August 1691	1 August 1708		20 October 1740 husband's death	21 December 1750	Charles IV
	Maria Theresa (suo jure)	Charles IV (Habsburg)	13 May 1717	12 February 1736	20 October 1740 father's death	29 November 1780		Francis I

=== House of Habsburg-Lorraine, 1780–1794 ===
Picture	Name	Father	Birth	Marriage	Became Duchess	Ceased to be Duchess	Death	Spouse
	Maria Luisa of Spain	Charles III of Spain (Bourbon)	24 November 1745	5 August 1765	20 February 1790 husband's ascession	1 March 1792 husband's death	15 May 1792	Leopold
	Maria Theresa of Naples and Sicily	Ferdinand I of the Two Sicilies (Bourbon-Two Sicilies)	6 June 1772	15 September 1790	1 March 1792 husband's ascession	1794; Limburg occupied by France	13 April 1807	Francis

=== House of Orange-Nassau, 1839–1866 ===
Picture	Name	Father	Birth	Marriage	Became Duchess	Ceased to be Duchess	Death	Spouse
	Anna Pavlovna of Russia	Paul I of Russia (Holstein-Gottorp-Romanov)	18 January 1795	21 February 1816	7 October 1840 husband's accession	7 March 1849 husband's death	1 March 1865	William II
	Sophie of Württemberg	William I of Württemberg (Württemberg)	17 June 1818	18 June 1839	7 March 1849 husband's accession	11 May 1867; Limburg became part of the Kingdom of the Netherlands	3 June 1877	William III

== See also ==
- Duchess of Brabant
- List of Lotharingian consorts
- List of Burgundian consorts
- List of consorts of Luxembourg
- Countess of Flanders
- Countess of Holland
- List of Dutch consorts
