= Arnold II of Laurenburg =

Arnold II, Count of Laurenburg
- Born: Unknown
- Died: 1158/59
- Noble family: House of Nassau
- Spouse: ?
- Father: Rupert I of Laurenburg
- Mother: Beatrix of Limburg

Arnold II of Laurenburg, German: Arnold II. von Laurenburg (died 1158/59) was count of Laurenburg and one of the ancestors of the House of Nassau.

== Life ==
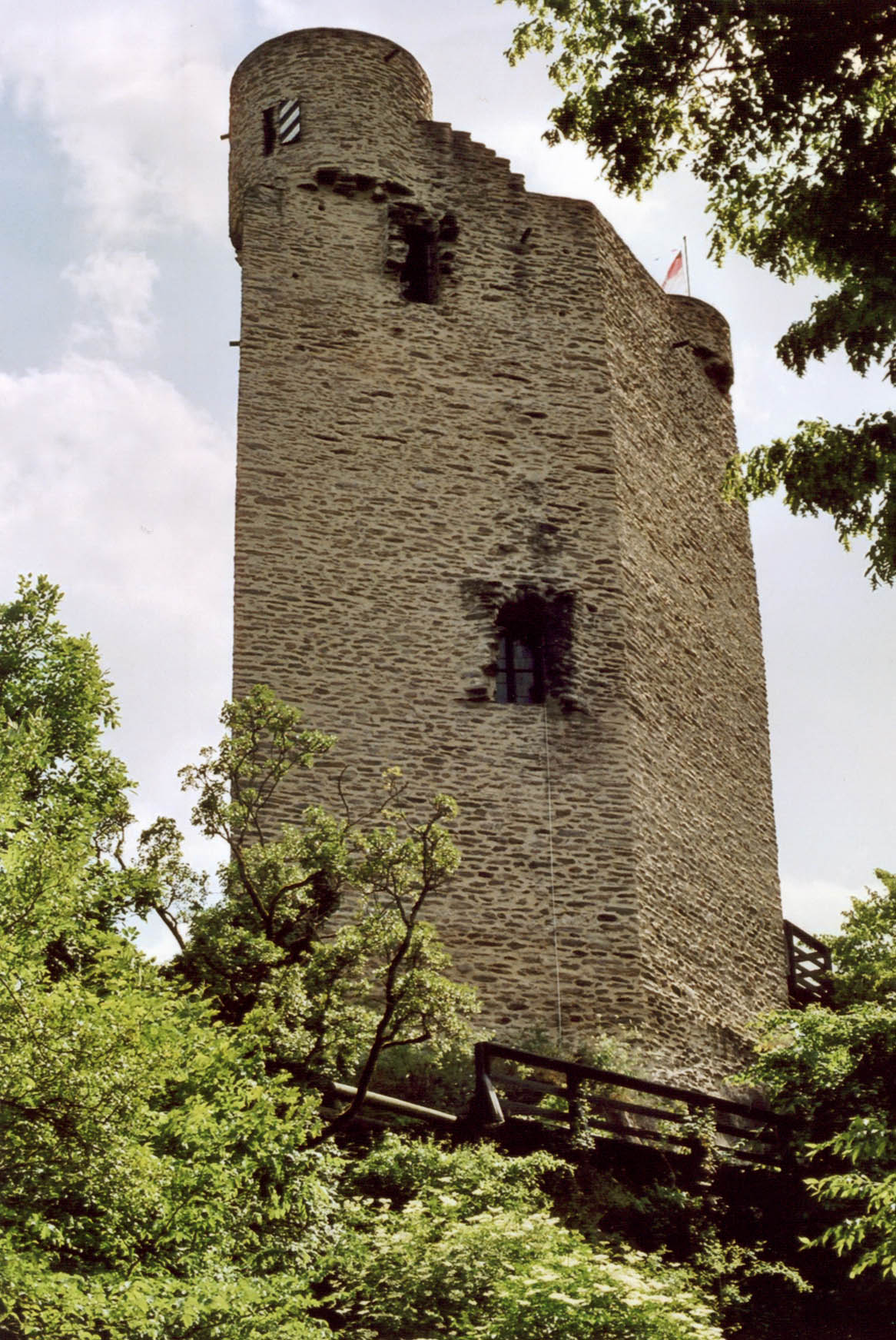
Laurenburg Castle

Arnold was a son of count Rupert I of Laurenburg and Beatrix of Limburg, a daughter of Walram II ‘the Pagan’, Count of Limburg and Duke of Lower Lorraine, and Jutta of Guelders (daughter of count Gerard I of Guelders). His parentage is confirmed by the charter dated 1151 under which Henry II of Leez, Bishop of Liège, confirmed the donations by ‘domina Jutta, nobilissima matrona uxor ducis Walrami de Lemburg’ to Rolduc Abbey, which records the presence at her burial in Rolduc of ‘… Arnoldus quoque filius Ruberti comitis de Lunneburg natus ex domina Beatrice filia præfatæ dominæ …’.

Arnold is mentioned as count of Laurenburg between 1151 and 1158. He ruled together with his brother Rupert II. Arnold and Rupert were, together with their mother, last mentioned in a charter dated 1 April 1158.

== Uncertainty about wife and children ==
Due to the lack of data, there is much unknown about the early counts of Laurenburg and Nassau, including the exact family relationships. No marriage has been mentioned of Arnold. He is supposed to be the father of count Rupert III of Nassau.

== Sources ==
- This article was translated from the corresponding Dutch Wikipedia article, as of 2018-08-25.
- Dek, A.W.E. (1970). Genealogie van het Vorstenhuis Nassau [Genealogy of the Royal House of Nassau] (in Dutch). Zaltbommel: Europese Bibliotheek. OCLC 27365371.
- Hesselfelt, H.F.J. (1965). "De oudste generaties van het Huis Nassau" [The oldest generations of the House of Nassau]. De Nederlandsche Leeuw, Maandblad van het Koninklijk Nederlandsch Genootschap voor Geslacht- en Wapenkunde [The Dutch Lion, Monthly Journal of the Royal Dutch Society for Genealogy and Heraldry] (in Dutch). 1965 (11): 354–365.
- Venne, J.M. van de; Stols, Alexander A.M. (1937). Geslachts-Register van het Vorstenhuis Nassau [Genealogy of the Royal House of Nassau] (in Dutch). Maastricht: A.A.M. Stols’ Uitgevers-Maatschappij.
- Vorsterman van Oyen, A.A. (1882). Het vorstenhuis Oranje-Nassau. Van de vroegste tijden tot heden [The Royal House of Orange-Nassau. From the earliest days until the present] (in Dutch). Leiden & Utrecht: A.W. Sijthoff & J.L. Beijers.

German nobility
Preceded by Rupert I	co-Count of Laurenburg (with Rupert II); 1151–1158	Succeeded by Rupert III
