= Beatrix of Limburg =

- Died: 12 July after 1164
- Noble family: House of Limburg
- Spouse: Rupert I of Laurenburg
- Issue: Arnold II of Laurenburg; Rupert II of Laurenburg
- Father: Walram II of Limburg
- Mother: Jutta of Guelders

Beatrix of Limburg, (German: Beatrix von Limburg, died 12 July after 1164, still mentioned in 1165) was a German noblewoman who probably for a while acted as regent of the county of Laurenburg for her grandsons, who later became counts of Nassau.

== Life ==
Coat-of-Arms of the Counts of Limburg

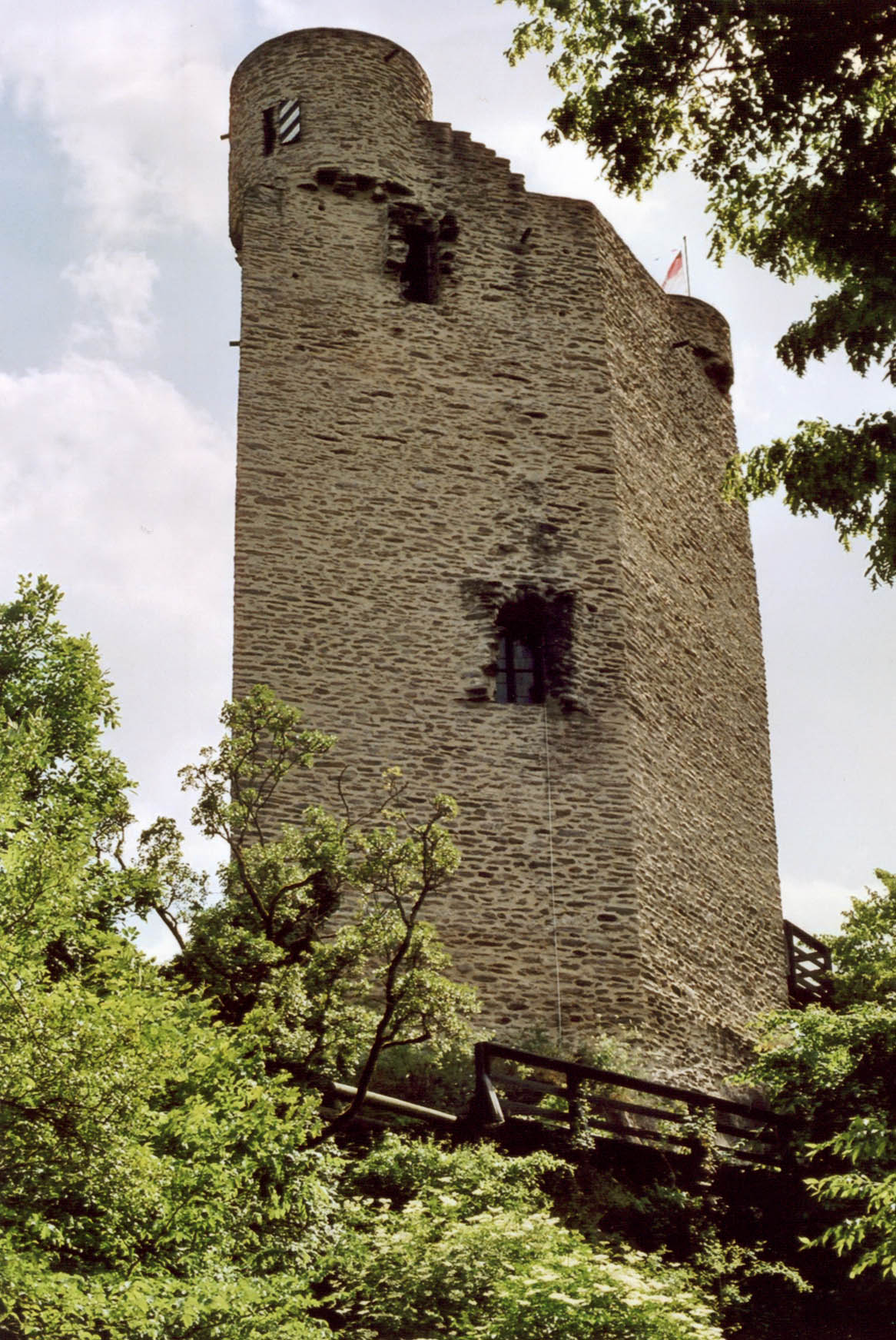
Laurenburg Castle

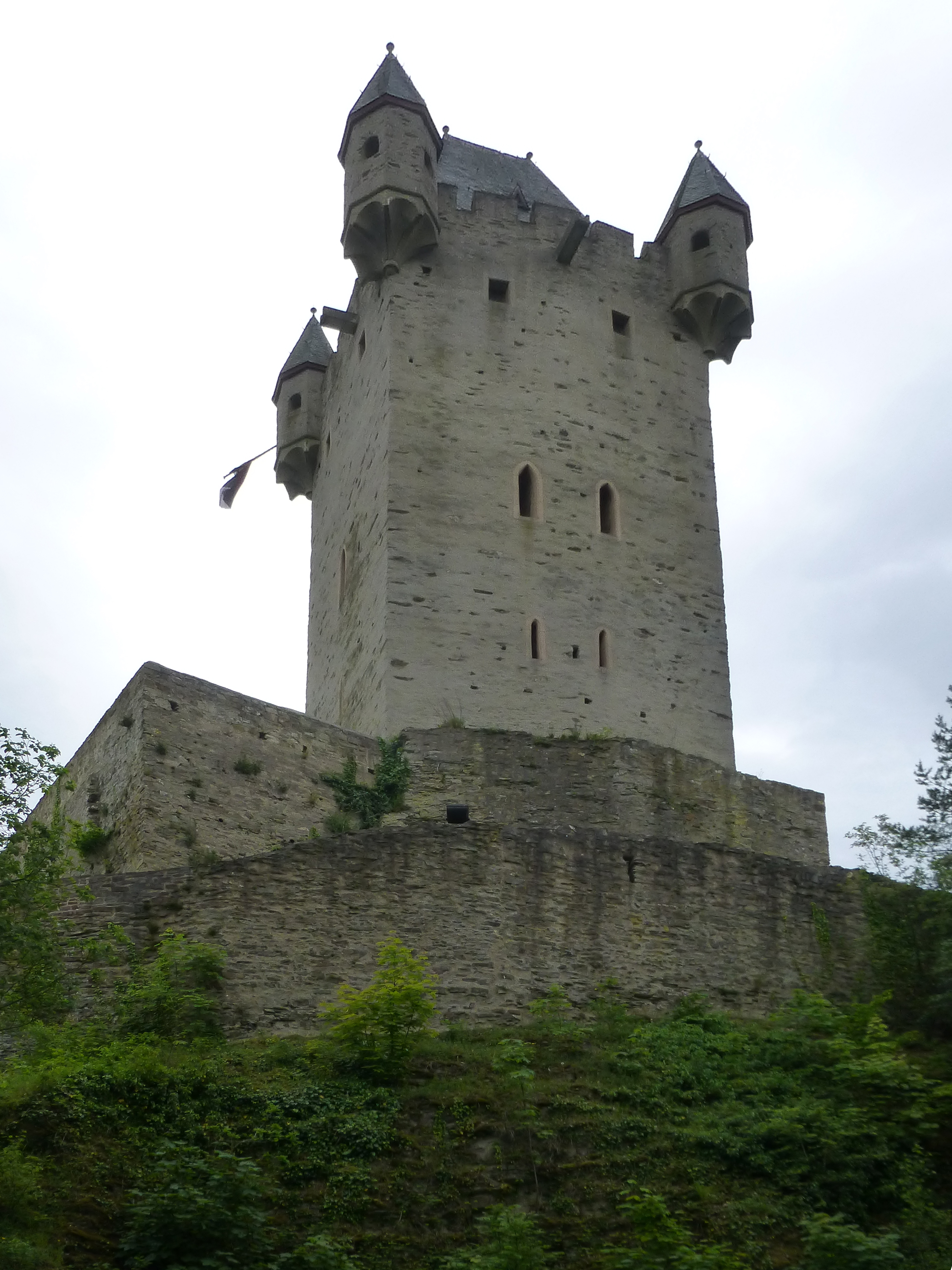
Nassau Castle

Beatrix was a daughter of Walram II ‘the Pagan’, Count of Limburg and Duke of Lower Lorraine, and Jutta of Guelders (herself a daughter of Count Gerard I of Guelders). Her parentage is confirmed by the charter dated 1151 under which Henry II of Leez, Bishop of Liège, confirmed the donations by ‘domina Jutta, nobilissima matrona uxor ducis Walrami de Lemburg’ to Rolduc Abbey, which records the presence at her burial in Rolduc of ‘Arnoldus quoque filius Ruberti comitis de Lunneburg natus ex domina Beatrice filia præfatæ dominæ’.

Hillin of Falmagne, the Archbishop and Prince-elector of Trier, recorded, in a charter dated 1 April 1158, that ‘castrum de Nassouwe’ had previously belonged to the church of Worms but that ‘Ruberti et Arnoldi de Luremburg’ had built a castle (Nassau Castle) against the wishes of the church, and that ‘postmodum … Beatrix comitissa et coheredes eius … filii Ruberti et Arnoldi de Luremburg’ had requested settlement of the dispute which was mediated by ‘Gerlaci de Isemburch et Everhardi de Burgensheim’. This document suggests that Beatrix survived both her sons and acted as head of the family on behalf of her grandsons.

== Marriage and children ==
Beatrix married before 1135, possibly c. 1125, to Rupert I, Count of Laurenburg (died before 13 May 1154). From this marriage the following children were born:

1. Arnold II (died 1158/59), mentioned as count of Laurenburg 1151–1158.
2. Rupert II (died ca. 1159), mentioned as count of Laurenburg 1154–1158.

In a charter from 1148 a certain Gerhard of Laurenburg is mentioned, who quite possibly was a younger son of Rupert I, however his relationship does not appear in any charter. No marriage is mentioned for this Gerhard.
