= Arnold II =

Arnold II may refer to:

- Arnold II of Boulogne
- Arnold II, Count of Looz (died 1146)
- Arnold II Hahót (died after 1244), Hungarian baron
- Arnold II, Count of Laurenburg (died 1158/59)
- Arnold II of Horne (1339–1389)
- Arnold II, Count of Cleves from 1198 through 1201, possibly as a regent
