= Rupert I of Laurenburg =

German count (1124–1152)

Rupert I, Count of Laurenburg
- Born: Unknown
- Died: before 13 May 1154
- Noble family: House of Nassau
- Spouse: Beatrix of Limburg
- Issue: Arnold II of Laurenburg; Rupert II of Laurenburg
- Father: Dudo of Laurenburg
- Mother: The fourth of the seven daughters of count Louis I of Arnstein

Rupert I of Laurenburg, German: Ruprecht I. von Laurenburg (died before 13 May 1154), was count of Laurenburg and one of the ancestors of the House of Nassau.

== Biography ==
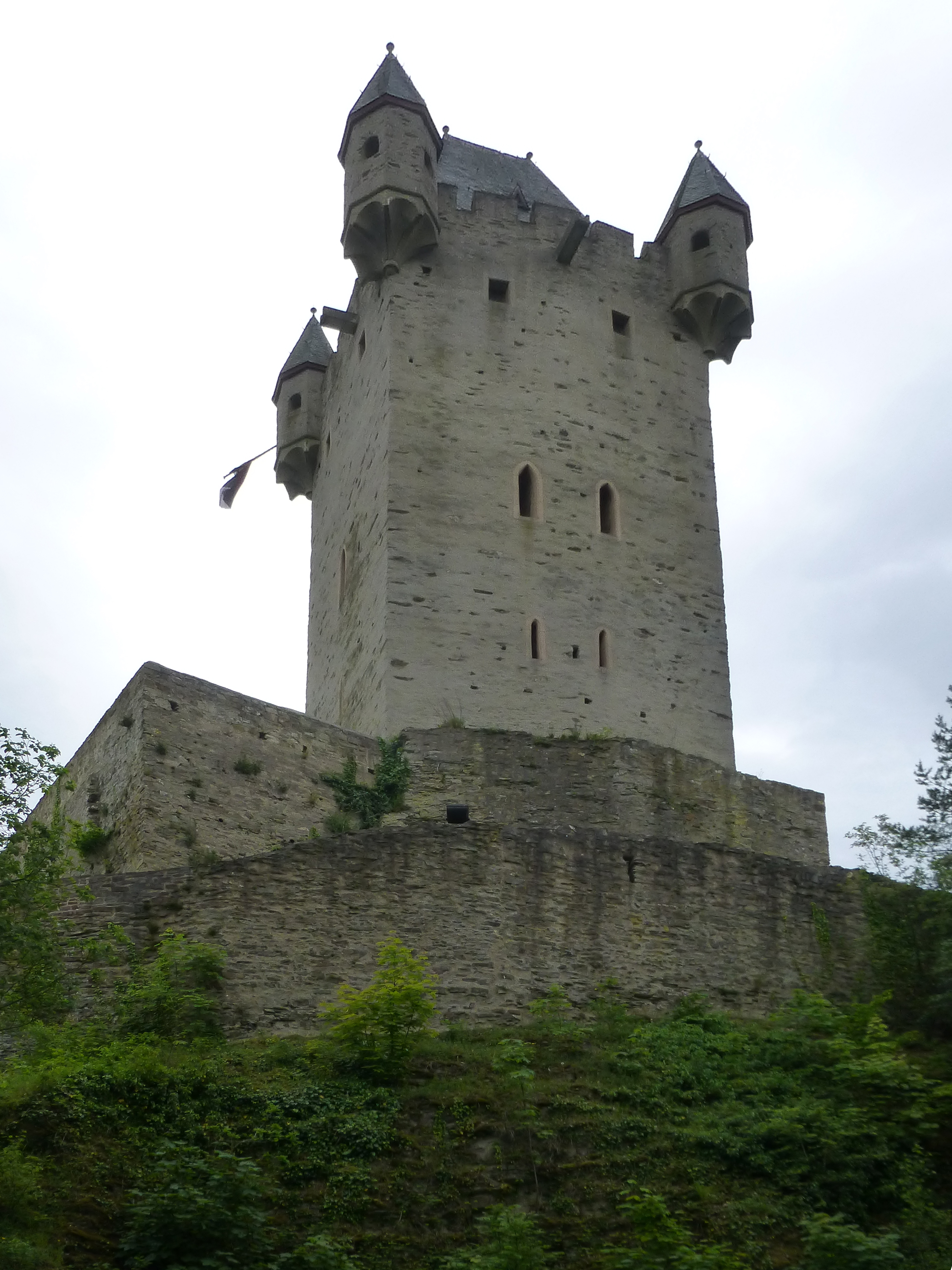
Nassau Castle

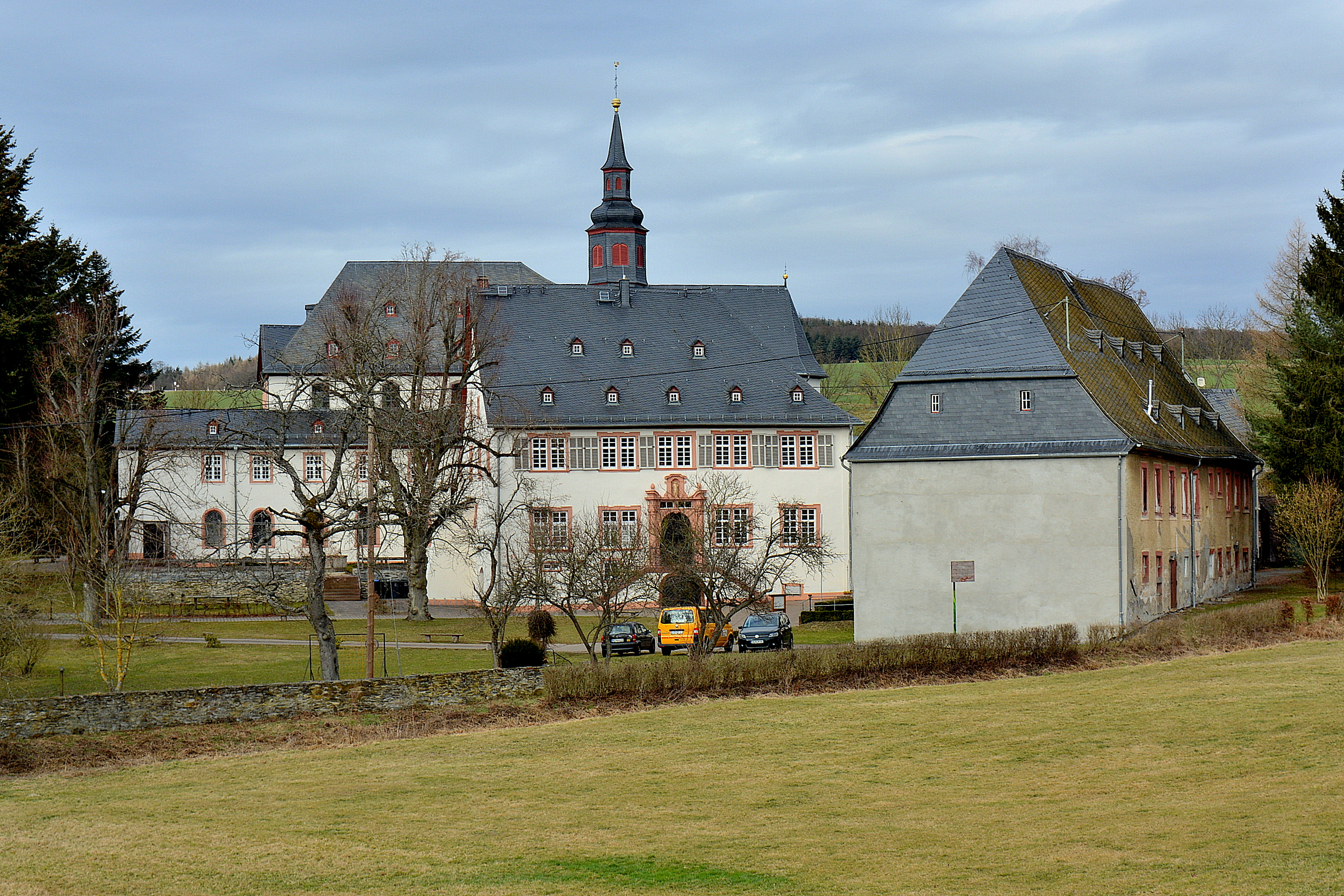
Schönau Abbey

Rupert was a son of Dudo of Laurenburg (German: Dudo von Laurenburg) and the fourth of the seven daughters of count Louis I of Arnstein, possibly her name was Irmgardis or Demudis.

Rupert is mentioned as count of Laurenburg between 1124 and 1152. He probably ruled together with his brother Arnold I. Rupert and Arnold built Nassau Castle around 1124.

In 1124, Rupert became the Bishopric of Worms's Vogt over the Weilburg Diocese. He inherited this position from the Hessian Count Werner IV of Gröningen. Idstein, which had come under the control of Dudo in 1122, was also added to this fief. Through this, Rupert was able to decisively expand the possessions of his House. He gained, among other lands, the village of Dietkirchen and established himself in the Haiger Mark.

Along with numerous property and lordship rights in the Westerwald and Dill River region, Weilburg's territory included the former Königshof Nassau, which had fallen to Weilburg in 914. This did not, however, settle the dispute with the Bishop of Worms over the legality of constructing Nassau Castle.
Rupert had little luck in this dispute between his house and the Bishop of Worms over the sovereignty over Nassau Castle. He was excommunicated by Pope Eugene III. The dispute was settled through the intervention of the Archbishop of Trier in 1159, about five years after Rupert's death.

In 1126, Rupert endowed the Benedictine Schönau Abbey near Lipporn. The land had already in 1117 been donated by Count Dudo to Schaffhausen Abbey for construction of a monastery. Under Rupert's rule, from 1126 to 1145, the Romanesque buildings were constructed, presumably including a three-nave basilica. The Abbey included both a monastery for monks and a convent for nuns. From 1141 until her death in 1164, the abbey convent would be the home of St. Elizabeth of Schönau.

Archbishop Adalbert I of Mainz confirmed the foundation of Schönau Abbey by 'cognatus noster comes Ruobertus de Lurenburch' by charter dated 1132, before 13 September.

Rupert is mentioned in a charter from 1132 as Lord of Miehlen.

Rupert is regularly mentioned on court days and the Imperial Diet of King Conrad III of Germany, for example during Christmas 1146 in Speyer, where Bernard of Clairvaux preached the crusade. Rupert often appears as witness in royal charters.

Rupert had continual disputes with several of his neighbors. He was a loyal follower of the Hohenstaufen Emperors. He died before 13 May 1154.

== Marriage and children ==
Rupert married before 1135, possibly c. 1125, to Beatrix of Limburg († 12 July after 1164, still mentioned in 1165), daughter of Walram II 'the Pagan', Count of Limburg and Duke of Lower Lorraine, and Jutta of Guelders (daughter of Count Gerard I of Guelders).
From this marriage the following children were born:

1. Arnold II of Laurenburg (died 1158/1159), mentioned as count of Laurenburg 1151–1158.
2. Rupert II of Laurenburg (died c. 1159), mentioned as count of Laurenburg 1154–1158.

In a charter from 1148 a certain Gerhard of Laurenburg is mentioned, who quite possibly was a younger son of Rupert I, however his relationship does not appear in any charter. No marriage is mentioned for this Gerhard.

German nobility
Preceded by —	co-Count of Laurenburg (with Arnold I); 1124–1152	Succeeded by Arnold II and Rupert II
