= Rupert of Laurenburg =

German noble

Rupert
- Noble family: House of Nassau
- Issue: Dudo?
- Father: Adelhart?

Rupert (German: Ruprecht) was Vogt at Siegen and is one of the eldest known possible ancestors of the House of Nassau.

== Life ==
Rupert is mentioned at Siegen between 1079 and 1082 as the owner of parts of the lands of Lipporn/Laurenburg, and in a charter from 1079/89 as Vogt at Siegen. He was a vassal of the Electorate of Mainz. It is possible that Rupert was already Count of Laurenburg, but he isn't mentioned as such in any charter.

Perhaps Rupert was a son of Adelhart, who is mentioned in a charter from 1048 as Vogt at Haiger for the Abbey of Worms. Rupert was the father of Dudo of Laurenburg.

There are more persons known who, as owners of the lands of Lipporn/Laurenburg (and thus the predecessors of Rupert), probably also were his ancestors. The first is a certain Drutwin mentioned in 881 as a landowner in Prüm, and who is the oldest known possible ancestor of the House of Nassau.

== Sources ==
- This article was translated from the corresponding Dutch Wikipedia on September 12th, 2019.
- Hesselfelt, H.F.J. (1965). "De oudste generaties van het Huis Nassau" [The oldest generations of the House of Nassau]. De Nederlandsche Leeuw, Maandblad van Het Koninklijk Nederlandsch Genootschap voor Geslacht- en Wapenkunde [The Dutch Lion, Monthly Journal of the Royal Dutch Society for Genealogy and Heraldry] (in Dutch). 1965 (11): 354–365.
- Lück, Alfred (1981) [1967]. Siegerland und Nederland [Siegerland and The Netherlands] (in German) (2nd ed.). Siegen: Siegerländer Heimatverein e.V.
