= Rupert I =

Rupert I may refer to:

- Rupert I, Count of Laurenburg (died 1154)
- Rupert I, Elector Palatine (1309–1390)
- Rupert I of Legnica (1347–by 1409)
