= Hillin of Falmagne =

- Archbishop of Trier
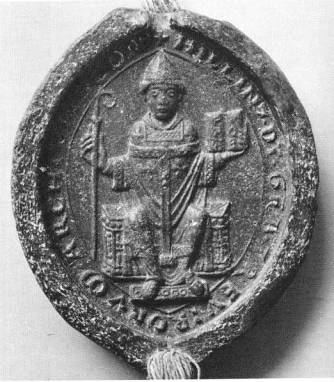
- Hillin of Falmagne's seal of 1159 shows the mitered archbishop wearing the pallium and holding a crosier and a book inscribed PAX VOB. The inscription around the edge reads + HILLIN • DI • GRA • TREVIRORVM • ARCHI • EPISCOPVS.
- Church: Catholic Church
- Diocese: Electorate of Trier
- In office: 1152–1169

Personal details
- Born: c. 1100
- Died: 23 October 1169

Hillin of Falmagne (German: Hillin von Fallemanien, also spelled Falemagne, Fallemanien, Fallenmaigne, etc.) (c. 1100 – 23 October 1169), was the Archbishop of Trier from 1152. He was an imperialist and a partisan of Frederick Barbarossa in the Investiture Controversy of the twelfth century.

== Biography ==
Hillin's familial origins trace back to the commune of Falmagne near Dinant in Wallonia, now in the province of Namur in Belgium, but then part of the Prince-Bishopric of Liège. He was educated in France. In 1130, he arrived in Trier, taking part in the consecration of the previous Archbishop, Albero of Montreuil. In 1142, he took up direction of the cathedral school; in 1150, he was named Dean of the cathedral, and in 1152 he was elected Archbishop by the clergy and the people.

=== Imperial Politics ===
Later that year Barbarossa was elected King of the Romans with the Archbishop's support. Shortly after the election Hillin made his first journey into Italy, accompanying the Archbishop of Salzburg, the Bishop of Bamberg, and the Abbot of Erbach, as an envoy to notify the pope of Frederick's nomination, and there was consecrated by Pope Eugenius III himself, most likely in Segni. After Hillin's return to Germany, he took part in Frederick's first plenary court in July 1152 at Regensburg.

In 1154 – 1155 Hillin accompanied Barbarossa on the Emperor's first expedition into Italy. In December 1154 he took part in an Imperial Diet at Roncaglia. On 18 June 1155, Hillin was one of the prelates attending Barbarossa's imperial coronation by Pope Adrian IV, and in October of that year was appointed as Adrian's papal legate for Germany. In June 1156 he enjoyed the privilege of crowning Beatrice of Burgundy as queen in Worms. After Adrian's death on 1 September 1159 amid rising tensions between the Imperial and Papal parties, Hillin lent his support in the disputed papal election to Barbarossa and his antipope Victor IV rather than to the majority-elected "Sicilian" candidate, Pope Alexander III; Victor made him legate for his support. After Victor's death in 1164, however, Hillin's support for the imperial party wavered, and in 1165, the Archbishop went over to the side of Alexander.

=== Internal Politics ===
In contrast to his predecessor Albero, Hillin was peaceable and prudent in character, as he displayed in continual efforts to establish peace among his various warring neighbors. Shortly after his accession to the See of Trier, Hillin served to reconcile Duke Matthias I of Lorraine and the Abbess of Rémiremont. In 1155, he managed to settle affairs between his diocese and Henry IV, Count of Luxembourg and Namur, the former advocatus of the abbey of Saint-Maximin at Trier, by exchanging the rights over the abbey with the town of Grevenmacher. In 1159, Hillin helped solve the dispute between Walram I, the self-styled "Count of Nassau," and the Bishopric of Worms, by exchanging his own estate in Partenheim in the Nahegau for the possessions around Nassau of Conrad I of Steinach, Bishop of Worms, and formally granting the fiefdom over the castle and town of Nassau to the House of Laurenburg, receiving the castle of the Laurenburgs as a loan. Around 1161, Hillin was forced to resist the Count Palatine Conrad, who supported the rights of the citizenry of Trier to create a commune. In 1163 Hillin secured reparations from Frederick of Merzig, who had been engaged in extortion, and lifted the excommunication placed upon him.

=== Religious and Cultural Activities ===
In order to settle affairs in the archdiocese, the archbishop turned to Bernard of Clairvaux, with whom he corresponded and to whom he made a personal visit in Lorraine, where the two managed to allay the strife between the people of Metz and Verdun. He also received letters from Elisabeth of Schönau, who, in an epistle written ca. 1159, rebuked Hillin for his pacific attitude and urged him to relay her prophecies of doom to the opponents of Victor IV. In 1169 Hillin engaged in correspondence with Hildegard of Bingen, whom he approached for advice, who visited Trier under his auspices, and who preached a stern sermon to the clergy and people thereof.

On 24 August 1156, the archbishop consecrated the splendid abbey church of Laach; on 29 October of the same year he confirmed the foundations of the (formerly Premonstratensian) abbey of Arnstein-on-the-Lahn. In 1163, Hillin founded another Premonstratensian monastery (destroyed in the 17th century) on the site of a chapel built by Godfrey of Beselich. The eastern half of Trier Cathedral can further be credited to Hillin. Among his secular constructions, Hillin fortified the castles of Manderscheid and Dreis with towers; around 1160, he took to renovating the Ehrenbreitstein Fortress, augmenting the archiepiscopal palace, deepening the moat, laying the foundations of a pentagonal keep, and digging a cistern.

He died in Trier, but his burial place is unknown.

Catholic Church titles
Preceded by Albero de Montreuil	Archbishop of Trier; 1152-1169	Succeeded by Arnold I of Vaucourt
