= Rupert III of Nassau =

Rupert III, Count of Nassau
- Born: Unknown
- Died: December , 1191
- Noble family: House of Nassau
- Spouse: Elizabeth of Leiningen
- Issue: Herman, Count of Nassau
- Father: Arnold II of Laurenburg
- Mother: ?

Rupert III ‘the Bellicose’ of Nassau, German: Ruprecht III. ‘der Streitbare’ von Nassau (died 23/28 December 1191), was one of the earliest counts of Nassau. He was not without significance for his country. Important government decisions characterize him, but much more important is his more general political activity, making him one of the most striking princes of the House of Nassau. He took part in the Third Crusade.

== Life ==
Coat-of-arms of the counts of Nassau

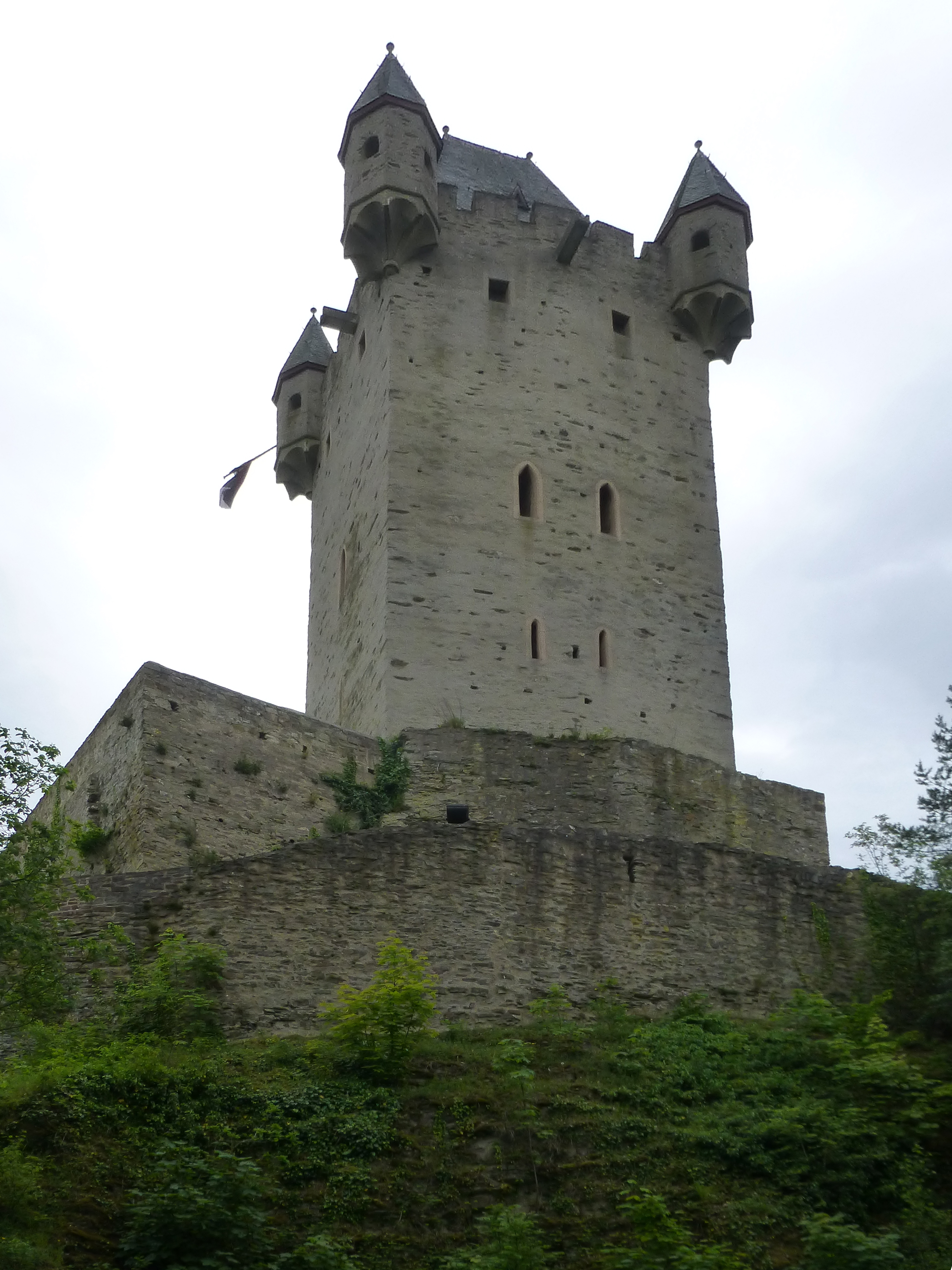
Nassau Castle

Rupert was probably a son of count Arnold II of Laurenburg and a woman of unknown name.

Rupert is mentioned as count of Nassau between 1160 and 1190. He ruled together with his cousin Henry I and later with his cousin Walram I.

Rupert was one of the trusted councilors of Emperor Frederick I Barbarossa, in whose surroundings we usually find him. In 1161 and 1162 he was with the emperor at Milan; whether he participated in the further trips to Italy in the years 1166 and 1167 remains questionable; likewise, participation in the unfortunate journey of 1174-1176 is, although likely, not traceable. It is also believed that he was present at the Diet of Pentecost at Mainz.

In 1172 Rupert became Vogt of Schönau Abbey and was since 1182 Vogt of Koblenz. He is called Ruoberdus comes in the inscription of a coin, which names Siegen as civitas, dated around 1175.

With his cousin Walram, Rupert joined the Third Crusade (1189-1190), and in 1190 commanded the fourth army troop. He was assigned an important task at the start of the journey. Together with his cousin Walram and Count Henry of Diez, he formed the accompaniment of Bishop Herman II of Münster, who was envoy to Byzantine Emperor Isaac II Angelos in the fall of 1188. The delegation did arrive in Constantinople, but was treated badly by the Byzantine Emperor and imprisoned in poor conditions. They were set free as the crusade army approached. On October 28, 1189, Rupert and his companions rejoined the crusade army at Philippopolis. Nothing is known with certainty about his further participation in the crusade; it seems that he stayed until the end of the siege of Akko and then died on the way back at sea. He was succeeded by his son Herman.

== Marriage and children ==
Rupert possibly married firstly to a daughter of William, Count of Gießen. (Note: Dek (1970), Hesselfelt (1965) and Van de Venne & Stols (1937) mention that Lucardis married firstly c. 1200 to Gebhard IV of Querfurt, Viscount of Magdeburg († Querfurt, 1213) and secondly in 1214 to Herman V, Count of Virneburg. Given the dating of a charter (27 February 1204) in which Lucardis' mother sells property with the consent of Herman of Virneburg and his wife Lucardis, Lucardis and Herman cannot have married in 1214. And because Gebhard of Querfurt died in 1213, his marriage to Lucardis is highly unlikely. Vorsterman van Oyen (1882) only mentions Lucardis' marriage to Herman of Virneburg.)

Rupert married in or before 1169 to Elizabeth of Leiningen (died 20 June 1235/38), daughter of Emicho III, Count of Leiningen. As widow she used the title countess of Schowenburg.
From this union came two children:

1. Herman (died 16 July before 1206), count of Nassau 1190–1192.
2. Lucardis (died before 1222), she married before 27 February 1204 to Herman III, Count of Virneburg († after 1254). (Note: Dek (1970), Hesselfelt (1965) and Van de Venne & Stols (1937) mention that Lucardis married firstly c. 1200 to Gebhard IV of Querfurt, Viscount of Magdeburg († Querfurt, 1213) and secondly in 1214 to Herman V, Count of Virneburg. Vorsterman van Oyen (1882) only mentions Lucardis' marriage to Herman of Virneburg.)

== Sources ==
- Dek, A.W.E. (1970). Genealogie van het Vorstenhuis Nassau [Genealogy of the Royal House of Nassau] (in Dutch). Zaltbommel: Europese Bibliotheek. OCLC 27365371.
- Hesselfelt, H.F.J. (1965). "De oudste generaties van het Huis Nassau" [The oldest generations of the House of Nassau]. De Nederlandsche Leeuw, Maandblad van het Koninklijk Nederlandsch Genootschap voor Geslacht- en Wapenkunde [The Dutch Lion, Monthly Journal of the Royal Dutch Society for Genealogy and Heraldry] (in Dutch). 1965 (11): 354–365.
- Lück, Alfred (1981) [1967]. Siegerland und Nederland [Siegerland and The Netherlands] (in German) (2nd ed.). Siegen: Siegerländer Heimatverein e.V.
- Sauer, Wilhelm (1889). "Ruprecht III., Graf von Laurenburg-Nassau" [Ruprecht III, Count of Laurenburg-Nassau]. Allgemeine Deutsche Biographie [Universal German Biography] (in German). Vol. Band 29. Leipzig: Duncker & Humblot. pp. 730–731.
- Sauer, Wilhelm (1896). "Graf Walram I. von Nassau" [Count Walram I of Nassau]. Allgemeine Deutsche Biographie [Universal German Biography] (in German). Vol. Band 40. Leipzig: Duncker & Humblot. pp. 776–778.
- Schwennicke, Detlev (1978). Europäische Stammtafeln. Stammtafeln zur Geschichte europäischen Staaten. Neue Folge [European Genealogies. Genealogies from the History of European States. New Series] (in German). Vol. Band I. Marburg: J.A. Stargardt.
- Setton, Kenneth M.; Hazard, Harry W.; Wolff, Robert Lee; Zacour, Norman P.; Whithed Baldwin, Marshall (2005) [1969]. A History of the Crusades: The Later Crusades, 1189-1311. Madison: University of Wisconsin Press. ISBN 978-0-299-04844-0.
- Venne, J.M. van de; Stols, Alexander A.M. (1937). Geslachts-Register van het Vorstenhuis Nassau [Genealogy of the Royal House of Nassau] (in Dutch). Maastricht: A.A.M. Stols’ Uitgevers-Maatschappij.
- Vorsterman van Oyen, A.A. (1882). Het vorstenhuis Oranje-Nassau. Van de vroegste tijden tot heden [The Royal House of Orange-Nassau. From the earliest days until the present] (in Dutch). Leiden & Utrecht: A.W. Sijthoff & J.L. Beijers.

German nobility
Preceded by Arnold II	co-Count of Nassau (with Henry I and Walram I); 1160–1190	Succeeded by Herman
