= Arnold I of Laurenburg =

Arnold I, Count of Laurenburg
- Born: Unknown
- Died: before 1154
- Noble family: House of Nassau
- Spouse: —
- Father: Dudo of Laurenburg
- Mother: The fourth of the seven daughters of count Louis I of Arnstein

Arnold I of Laurenburg, German: Arnold I. von Laurenburg (died before 1154), was count of Laurenburg and an ancestor of the House of Nassau.

== Life ==
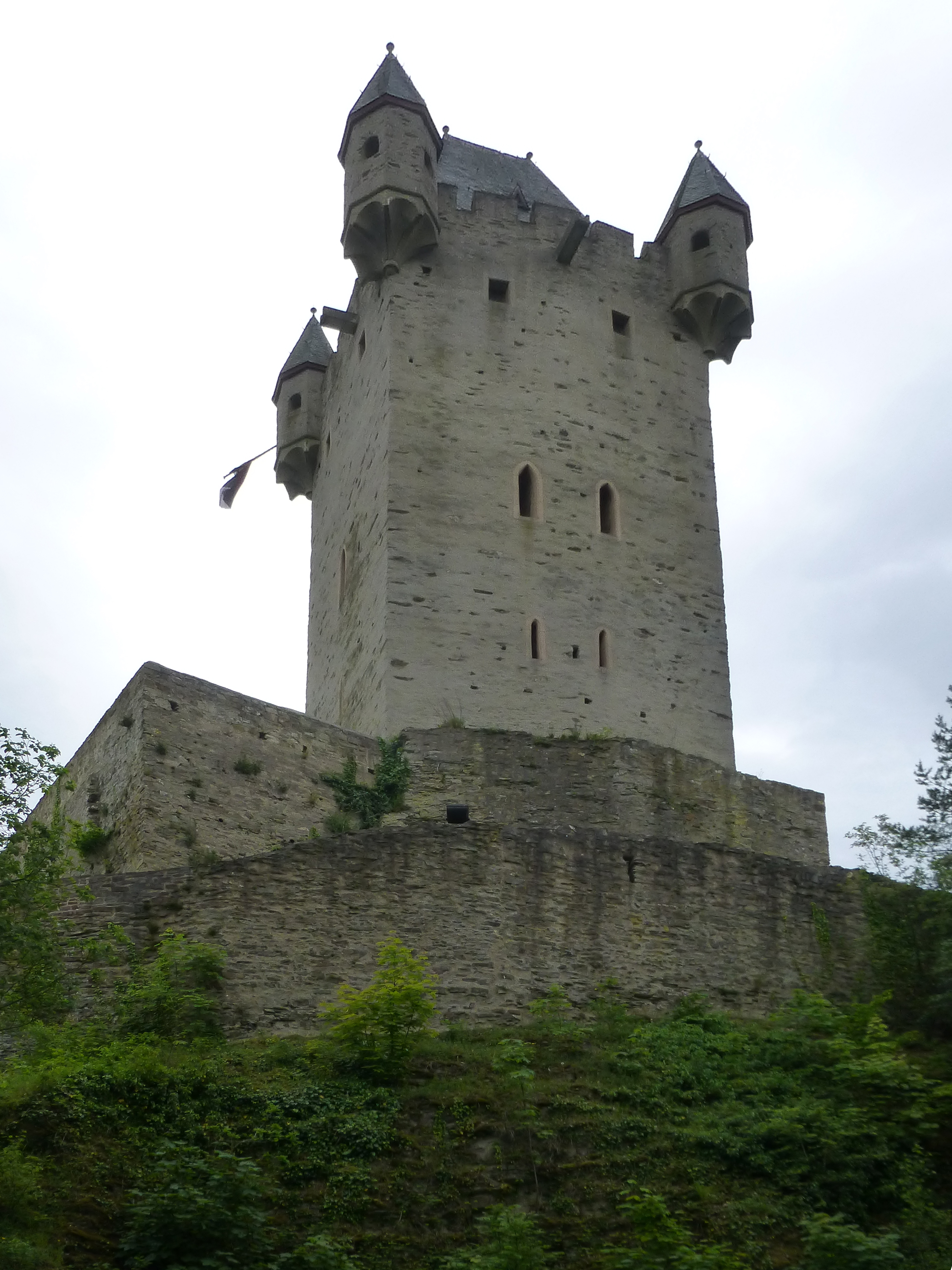
Nassau Castle

Arnold was a son of Dudo of Laurenburg (German: Dudo von Laurenburg) and the fourth of the seven daughters of count Louis I of Arnstein, possibly her name was Irmgardis or Demudis.

Arnold is mentioned as count of Laurenburg between 1124 and 1148. He probably ruled together with his brother Rupert I. Arnold and Rupert built Nassau Castle around 1124.

In 1124, Arnold became the Vogt of Idstein. Idstein had come under the control of Count Dudo in 1122.

Arnold was the Vogt of St. George's Monastery in Limburg 1124–1148.

No marriage has been mentioned of Arnold.

== Sources ==
- Parts of this article were translated from the corresponding Dutch Wikipedia on August 21st, 2018.
- Becker, E. (1983) [1950]. Schloss und Stadt Dillenburg. Ein Gang durch ihre Geschichte in Mittelalter und Neuzeit. Zur Gedenkfeier aus Anlaß der Verleihung der Stadtrechte am 20. September 1344 herausgegeben [Castle and City Dillenburg. A Journey through their History in Medieval and Modern Times. Published to celebrate the grant of Town Privileges on 20 September 1344] (in German) (Neuauflage ed.). Dillenburg: Der Magistrat der Stadt Dillenburg.
- Dek, A.W.E. (1970). Genealogie van het Vorstenhuis Nassau [Genealogy of the Royal House of Nassau] (in Dutch). Zaltbommel: Europese Bibliotheek. OCLC 27365371.
- Hesselfelt, H.F.J. (1965). "De oudste generaties van het Huis Nassau" [The oldest generations of the House of Nassau]. De Nederlandsche Leeuw, Maandblad van Het Koninklijk Nederlandsch Genootschap voor Geslacht- en Wapenkunde [The Dutch Lion, Monthly Journal of the Royal Dutch Society for Genealogy and Heraldry] (in Dutch). 1965 (11): 354–365.
- Schwennicke, Detlev (1998). Europäische Stammtafeln, Neue Folge [European Genealogies, New Series] (in German). Vol. Band I. Frankfurt am Main: Vittorio Klostermann GmbH. ISBN 3-465-02743-4. Table 60.
- Thiele, Andreas (1994). Erzählende genealogische Stammtafeln zur europäischen Geschichte, Band I, Teilband 2: Deutsche Kaiser-, Königs-, Herzogs- und Grafenhäuser II [Annotated genealogies from European History, Volume 1, Part 2: German Imperial, Royal, Ducal and Comital Houses II] (in German) (2nd ed.). Frankfurt am Main: RG Fischer Verlag. ISBN 3-89501-023-5.
- Venne, J.M. van de; Stols, Alexander A.M. (1937). Geslachts-Register van het Vorstenhuis Nassau [Genealogy of the Royal House of Nassau] (in Dutch). Maastricht: A.A.M. Stols’ Uitgevers-Maatschappij.
- Vorsterman van Oyen, A.A. (1882). Het vorstenhuis Oranje-Nassau. Van de vroegste tijden tot heden [The Royal House of Orange-Nassau. From the earliest days until the present] (in Dutch). Leiden & Utrecht: A.W. Sijthoff & J.L. Beijers.

German nobility
Preceded by —	co-Count of Laurenburg (with Rupert I); 1124–1148	Succeeded by Rupert I
