= Rupert IV of Nassau =

Rupert IV, Count of Nassau
- Died: after 1 January 1239
- Noble family: House of Nassau
- Spouse: Gertrud
- Father: Walram I, Count of Nassau
- Mother: Kunigunde

Rupert IV of Nassau, German: Ruprecht IV. von Nassau (died after 1 January 1239), was Count of Nassau. He later became a Knight of the Teutonic Order.

== Life ==
Coat of Arms of the Counts of Nassau

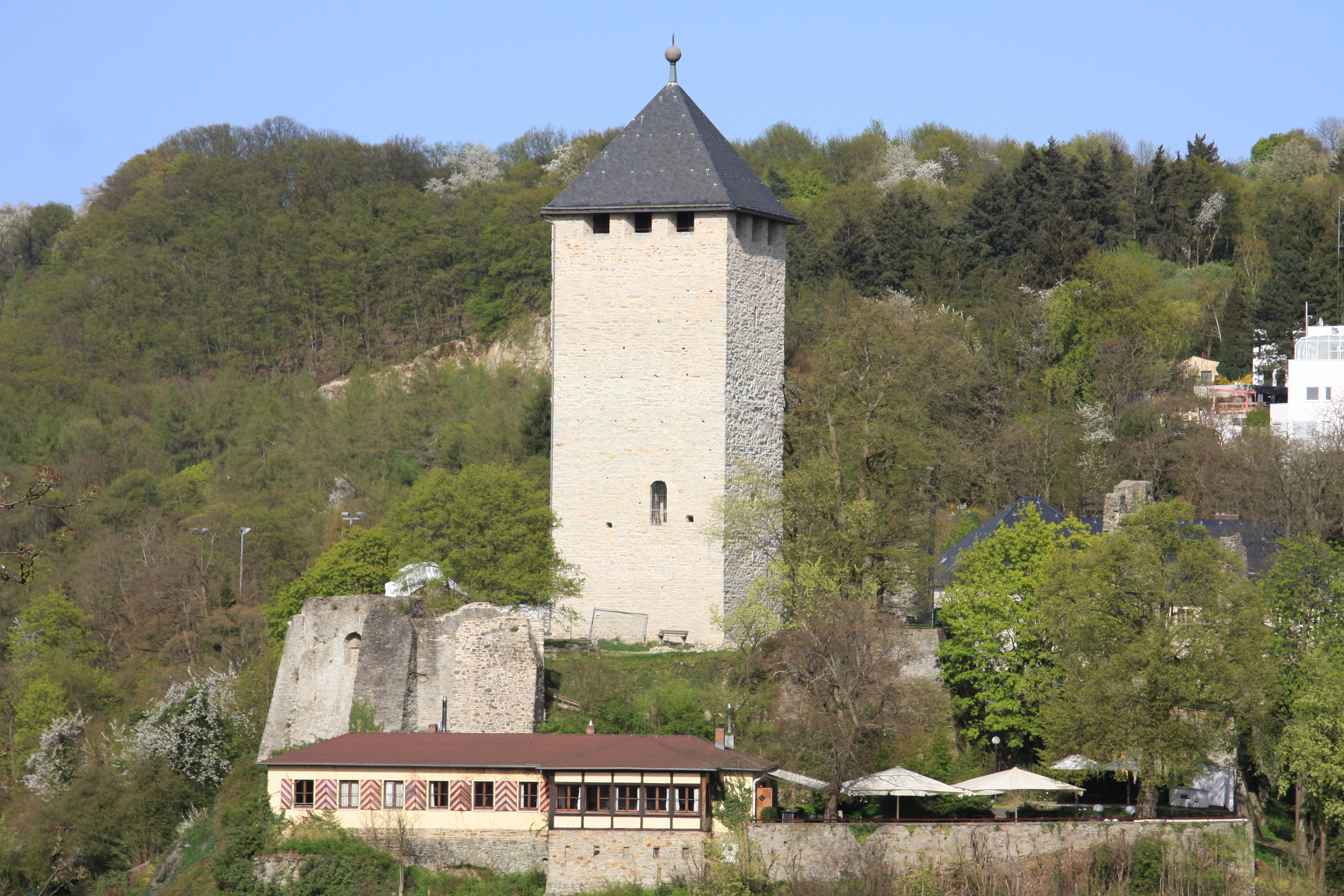
Sonnenberg Castle

Rupert IV was the second son of Count Walram I of Nassau and a certain Kunigunde, possibly a daughter of a count of Sponheim or a daughter of Poppo II, Count of Ziegenhain.

Rupert is mentioned for the first time in a charter dated 20 March 1198, together with his mother and his brother Henry II. This mention means that he and his brother were of age at that time, that is to say, they had reached the age of 12.

Rupert is mentioned as count of Nassau between 1198 and 1230. He reigned with his brother Henry.

Rupert's father had received the Königshof Wiesbaden from Emperor Frederick I in reward for his support of the emperor in the conflicts of 1170–1180. The Nassau possessions in this area were expanded around 1214 when Rupert's brother Henry received the Imperial Vogtship (Reichsvogtei) over Wiesbaden and the surrounding Königssondergau, which he held as fiefdoms.

About the year 1200, Rupert, together with his brother Henry, began building Sonnenberg Castle on a spur of Spitzkippel peak in the Taunus above Wiesbaden. This was intended for protection against the Archbishop of Mainz and its vassals, the Lords of Eppstein, who held the lands bordering Wiesbaden. However, the cathedral chapter of St. Martin's Cathedral in Mainz claimed Sonnenberg as their own. To settle the dispute, Nassau paid 30 Marks to the cathedral chapter in 1221 to acquire the land of Sonnenberg Castle. They were also forced to recognize the sovereignty of the Archbishops of Mainz over Sonnenberg, taking the castle as a fief of Mainz.

Coat of Arms of the Teutonic Order

Rupert is mentioned as a Knight of the Teutonic Order in 1230. Rupert died after January 1, 1239, and bequeathed his legacy to the Order. This would eventually lead to conflict between the House of Nassau and the Order.

== Marriage and children ==
Rupert married before 11 December 1215 to Gertrud (died ca. 1222), possibly a daughter of the Count of Cleeberg. From this marriage no children are known.

== Sources ==
- Dek, A.W.E. (1970). Genealogie van het Vorstenhuis Nassau [Genealogy of the Royal House of Nassau] (in Dutch). Zaltbommel: Europese Bibliotheek. OCLC 27365371.
- Thiele, Andreas (1994). Erzählende genealogische Stammtafeln zur europäischen Geschichte, Band I, Teilband 2: Deutsche Kaiser-, Königs-, Herzogs- und Grafenhäuser II [Annotated genealogies from European History, Volume 1, Part 2: German Imperial, Royal, Ducal and Comital Houses II] (in German) (2nd ed.). Frankfurt am Main: RG Fischer Verlag. ISBN 3-89501-023-5.
- Vorsterman van Oyen, A.A. (1882). Het vorstenhuis Oranje-Nassau. Van de vroegste tijden tot heden [The Royal House of Orange-Nassau. From the earliest days until the present] (in Dutch). Leiden & Utrecht: A.W. Sijthoff & J.L. Beijers.

German nobility
Preceded by Walram I	Count of Nassau (with Henry II); 1198–1230	Succeeded by Henry II
