= Henry II of Limburg =

Count of Arlon and Limburg (c. 1111–1167)

Henry II, Duke of Limburg
- Born: c. 1111
- Died: August 1167
- Noble family: House of Limburg
- Spouses: Mathilde of Saffenberg; Lauretta of Flanders
- Issue: Henry III; Margaret
- Father: Waleran, Duke of Lower Lorraine
- Mother: Jutta of Guelders

Henry II (c. 1111 – August 1167) was the duke of Limburg from 1139 and count of Arlon from 1147 to his death. He was the son of Waleran, Duke of Lower Lorraine, and Jutta of Guelders, daughter of Gerard I of Guelders. He succeeded his father in Limburg with the title of duke, but Conrad III refused to grant him Lower Lorraine. He continued to style himself as duke nevertheless.

== Life ==
Henry refused at first to accept the loss of Lorraine and in 1140 attacked the new duke, Godfrey VII. He was defeated. Godfrey died in 1142, but Henry was occupied with a war against the lord of Fauquemont and did not assert any claim to the duchy of Lower Lorraine.

In 1147, he inherited Arlon, his younger brother Waleran having died without children. Conrad confirmed this, for he had promised Henry a fief to compensate for the loss of Lorraine, and the duke and the king were reconciled. Henry did not take part in the Second Crusade that year, however. Henry attended the coronation of Conrad's successor, Frederick Barbarossa.

At that time, Henry was involved in a war with Henry IV of Luxembourg. The town of Andenne was taken and completely plundered and burned. Then Henry turned to Godfrey III of Leuven, but they soon made peace in 1155. Henry's daughter Margaret would later marry Godfrey III.

Henry took part in Barbarossa's Italian campaigns, dying during the epidemic of 1167 at Rome.

== Marriage and children ==
Henry married Mathilda, daughter of Adolf I von Saffenberg, and they had:

- Henry III, Duke of Limburg
- Margaret, married Godfrey III of Louvain

== Sources ==
- Bijsterveld, Arnoud-Jan (2007). Do Ut Des: Gift Giving, Memoria, and Conflict Management in the Medieval Low Countries. Verloren.
- Loud, Graham A.; Schenk, Jochen, eds. (2017). The Origins of the German Principalities, 1100-1350: Essays by German Historians. Routledge.
- Knodler, Julia (2010). "Germany: Feuds among German Princes (1125-1151)". In Rogers, Clifford J. (ed.). The Oxford Encyclopedia of Medieval Warfare and Military Technology. Vol. 2. Oxford University Press.

Henry II of Limburg House of Ardennes-Verdun Born: c. 1111 Died: August 1167
Preceded by Waleran II	Duke of Limburg; 1139–1167	Succeeded by Henry III
Preceded by Waleran III	Count of Arlon; 1147–1167	Succeeded by Henry III
