= Henry I of Nassau =

Count of Nassau (died 1167)

Henry I, Count of Nassau
- Born: Unknown
- Died: August , 1167; Rome
- Noble family: House of Nassau
- Father: Rupert II of Laurenburg
- Mother: ?

Henry I of Nassau, German: Heinrich I. von Nassau († Rome, August 1167), was the first person who named himself count of Nassau.

== Biography ==
Coat-of-arms of the counts of Nassau

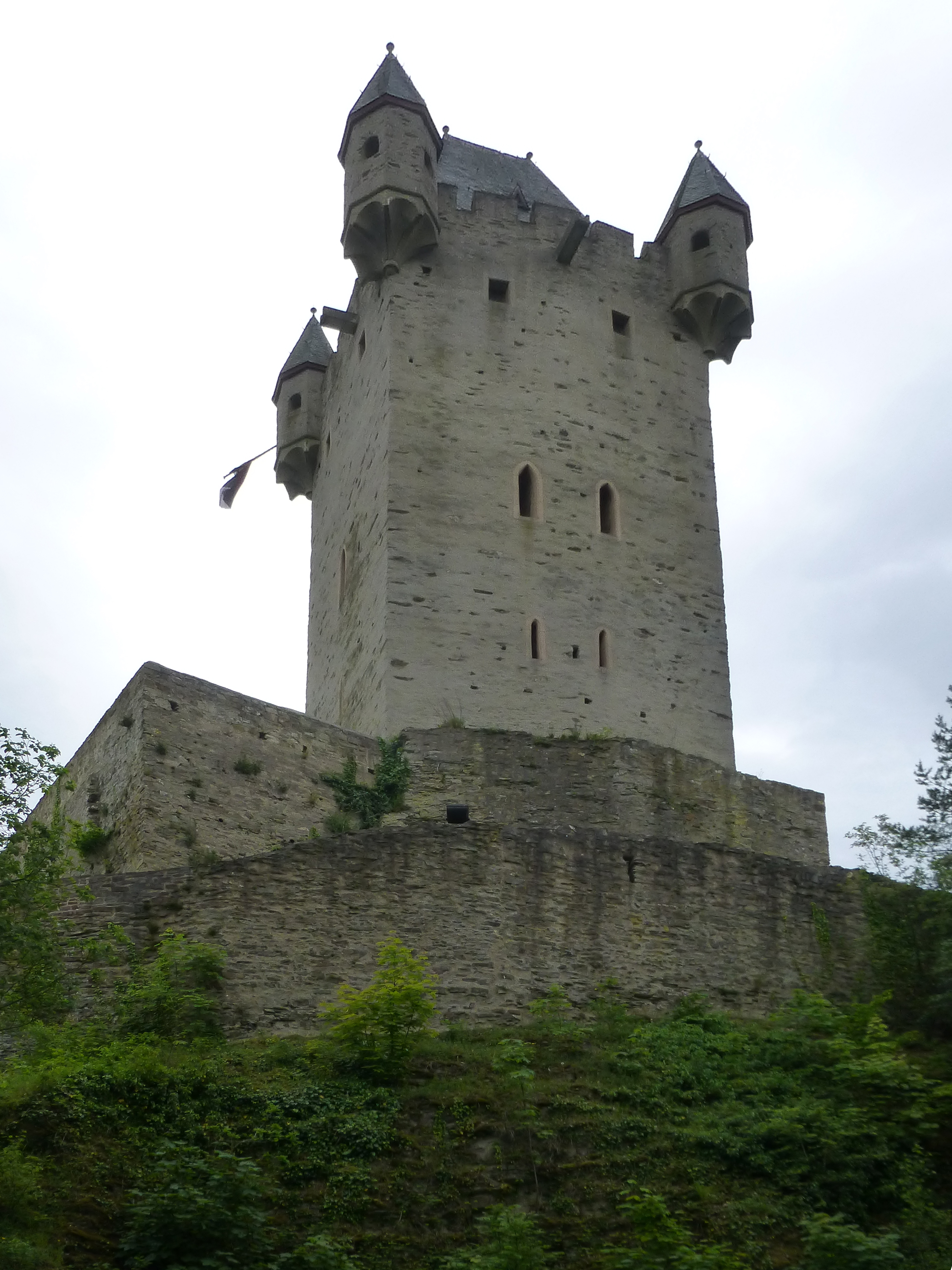
Nassau Castle

Henry was probably a son of count Rupert II of Laurenburg and an unknown woman.

Henry is mentioned as count of Nassau between 1160 and 1167. He ruled together with his cousin Rupert III.

In 1161, Henry was in the army camp of Emperor Frederick I Barbarossa. In 1167, Henry was the commander of an army of the Electorate of Cologne in Italy. Henry died of the plague in Rome in August 1167.

No marriage has been mentioned of Henry, he probably never married.

== Sources ==
- This article was translated from the corresponding Dutch Wikipedia article, as of 2018-08-25.
- Dek, A.W.E. (1970). Genealogie van het Vorstenhuis Nassau [Genealogy of the Royal House of Nassau] (in Dutch). Zaltbommel: Europese Bibliotheek. OCLC 27365371.
- Hesselfelt, H.F.J. (1965). "De oudste generaties van het Huis Nassau" [The oldest generations of the House of Nassau]. De Nederlandsche Leeuw, Maandblad van het Koninklijk Nederlandsch Genootschap voor Geslacht- en Wapenkunde [The Dutch Lion, Monthly Journal of the Royal Dutch Society for Genealogy and Heraldry] (in Dutch). 1965 (11): 354–365.
- Lück, Alfred (1981) [1967]. Siegerland und Nederland [Siegerland and The Netherlands] (in German) (2nd ed.). Siegen: Siegerländer Heimatverein e.V.
- Venne, J.M. van de; Stols, Alexander A.M. (1937). Geslachts-Register van het Vorstenhuis Nassau [Genealogy of the Royal House of Nassau] (in Dutch). Maastricht: A.A.M. Stols’ Uitgevers-Maatschappij.
- Vorsterman van Oyen, A.A. (1882). Het vorstenhuis Oranje-Nassau. Van de vroegste tijden tot heden [The Royal House of Orange-Nassau. From the earliest days until the present] (in Dutch). Leiden & Utrecht: A.W. Sijthoff & J.L. Beijers.

German nobility
Preceded by Rupert II	co-Count of Nassau (with Rupert III); 1160–1167	Succeeded by Walram I
