= Nassau Castle =

Castle in Nassau, Germany

- Nassau, Germany
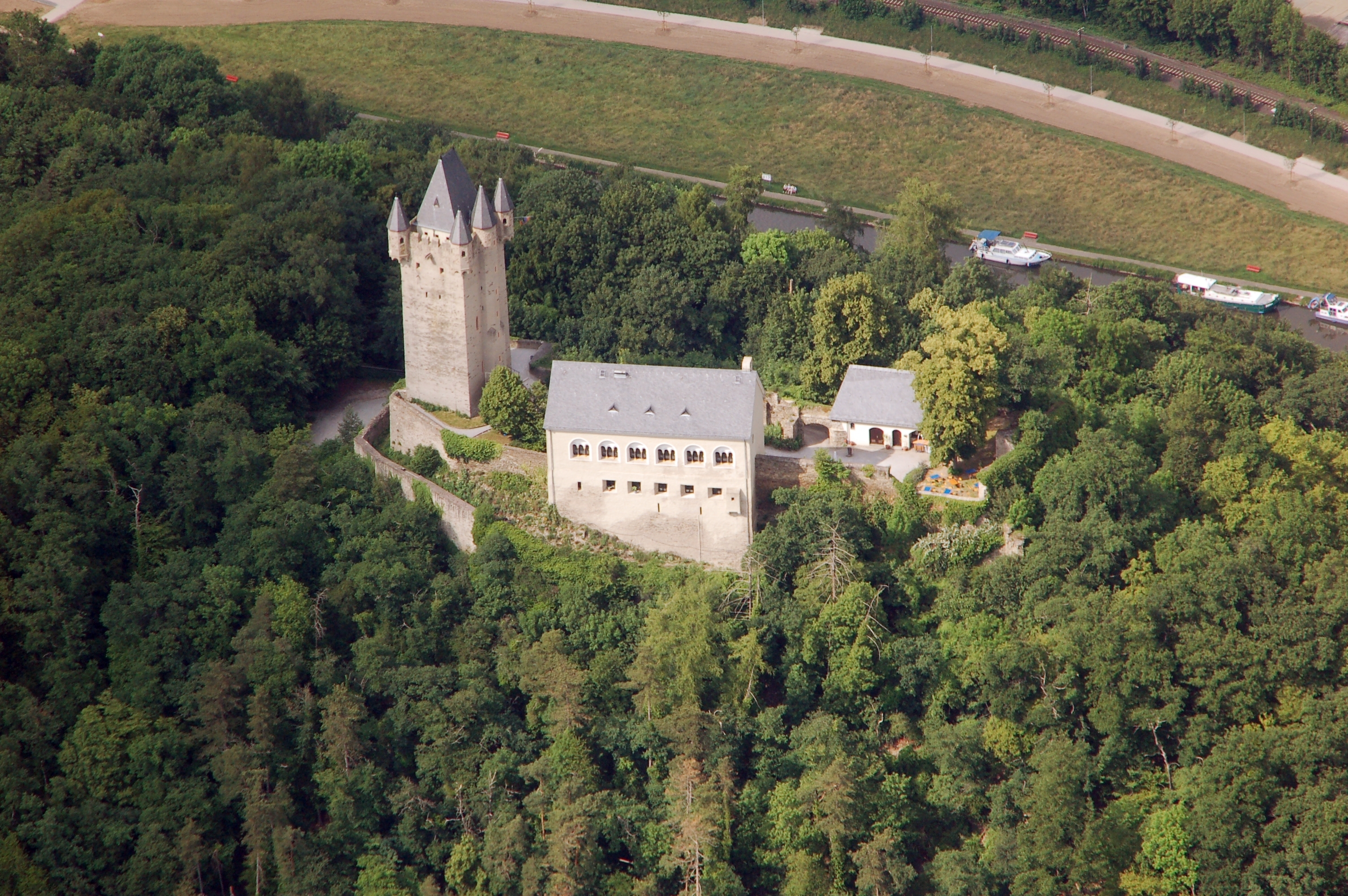
- Nassau Castle (aerial view)

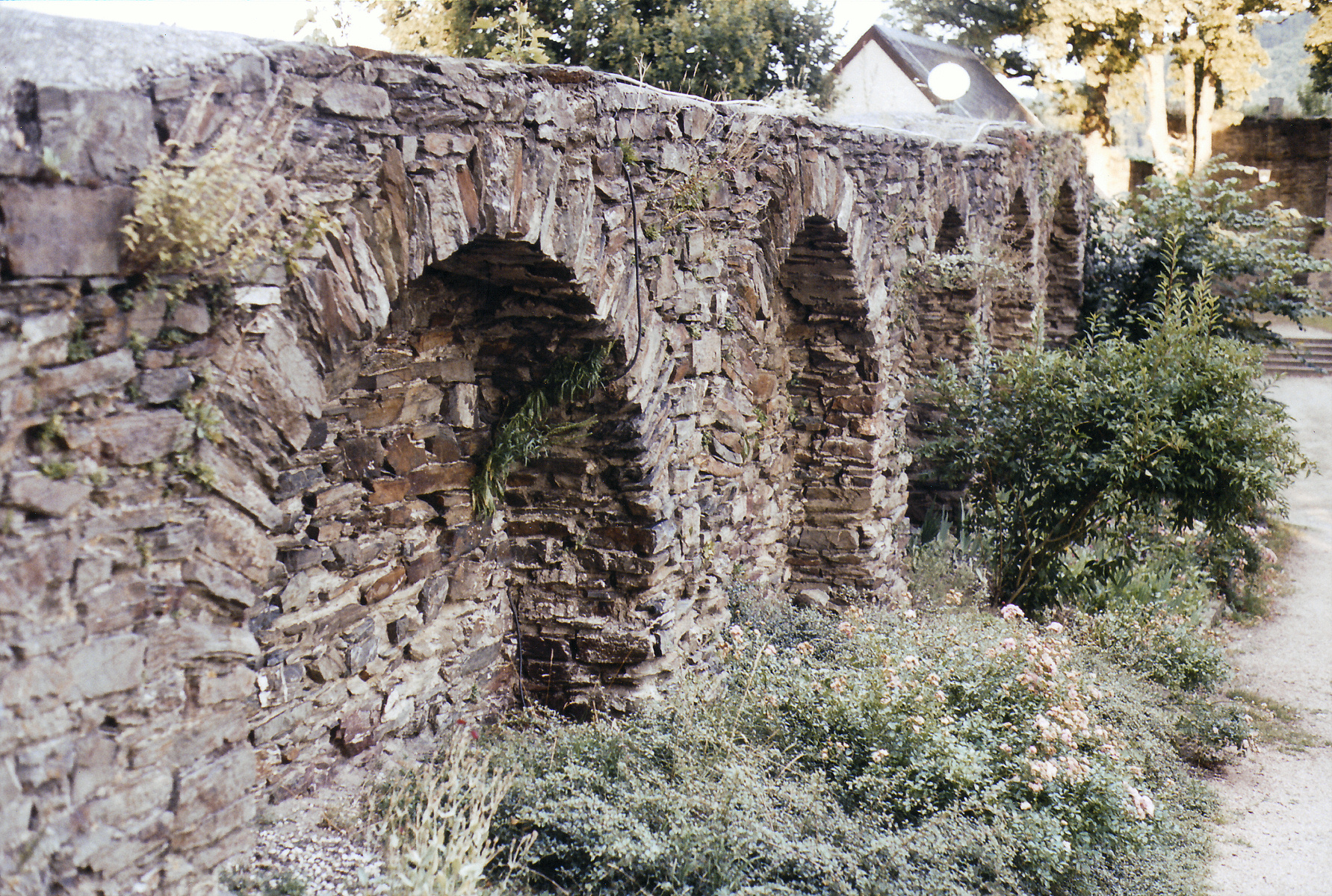
- Nassau Castle - Compound wall

Site information
- Type: Castle
- Open to the public: yes
- Condition: partially restored ruins

Location
- Coordinates: 50°18′37″N 7°47′31″E
- Height: 33 m

Site history
- Built: ca. 1100
- Built by: Dudo of Laurenburg

Nassau Castle, located in Nassau, Rhineland-Palatinate, Germany and named after it, was a castle and the ancestrial seat of the House of Nassau and also its namesake, also it is the namesake of the historical Nassau realms of the County and Duchy of Nassau . The ruins of the castle are situated on a rock outcropping about 120 m (390 ft) above the Lahn River. The House of Nassau was an aristocratic dynasty among whose descendants are the present-day monarchy of the Netherlands and Luxembourg.

== History ==
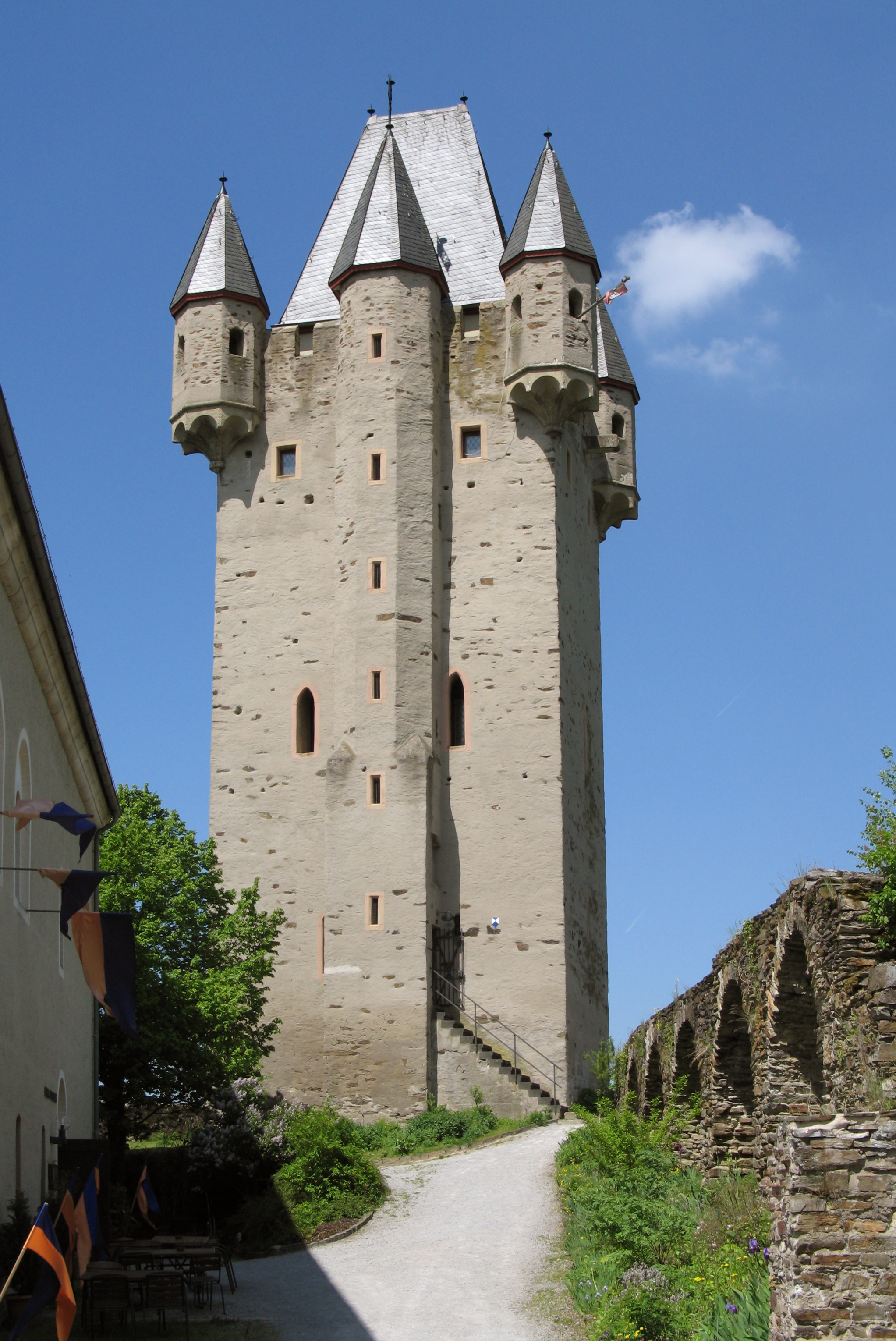
Nassau Castle's bergfried

The castle was founded around 1100 by Dudo of Laurenburg (German: Dudo von Laurenburg), the founder of the House of Nassau. In 1120, Dudo's sons and successors, Counts Rupert I (German: Ruprecht) and Arnold I, established themselves at Nassau Castle with its tower. They renovated and extended the castle complex in 1124.

Because the castle stood at that time on the territory of the Bishopric of Worms, a bitter feud developed between the family of the two brothers and the Bishopric of Worms. Even when Rupert I in 1124 inherited the position of the Bishopric of Worms' vogt in Weilburg, whose territory had included the former Königshof Nassau since 914, the conflict was not settled. When Rupert I began calling himself the Count of Nassau after the castle, the Worms Bishopric disputed the title.

The dispute was only solved (and the title confirmed) in 1159, about five years after Rupert’s death, under his son Walram I by the intervention of the Archbishop of Trier, Hillin of Falmagne. The Laurenburger family gave up their claim to allodial title and in return were given the fiefdom over the castle and town of Nassau from the archbishop. Thereafter, the Laurenburger family were titled the Counts of Nassau.

Walram I's son Henry II the Rich (Heinrich der Reiche) constructed the late-Romanesque main building (palas) of the castle between 1220 and 1230. In 1255, the Countship of Nassau was divided between Henry II's sons, Walram II and Otto I, in the so-called "Brothers' Division" (Bruderteilung). Nassau Castle, however, remained a common possession of the two brothers (the so-called Ganerbschaft in ancient Germanic hereditary laws).

In the first half of the 14th century, the still-extant five-sided 33 m (108 ft) high bergfried (similar to a keep) was built. A second castle tower is mentioned in 1346, but it no longer exists. During a family feud in 1372, the housing of the castle keepers was destroyed.

The counts lived in the castle until the end of the Middle Ages, at which time they gave it up as their residence. An etching by Matthäus Merian from 17th century shows an intact palas and bergfried as well as a gate building, but in the final phase of World War II, the remaining ruins were destroyed. When archeological surveys were done in 1970 to uncover the rectangular walls, only ruins were found.

The castle came into the possession of the State Castle Administration of Rhineland-Palatinate (Staatliche Schlösserverwaltung Rheinland-Pfalz) in 1965. Starting in 1976 restoration of the bergfried took place. Its hipped roof and merlon, as well as the side towers, were again reconstructed after the etching by Merian and the six to eight metres high arcaded vault in its interiors were restored. Furthermore, the opening to the dungeon of the tower was cleared. The reconstruction of the palas and its knights hall followed from 1979 to 1980. During the course of the restoration the late-Gothic window-arcades were rediscovered.

The main building today accommodates a restaurant, while the bergfried can be visited free of charge.

== Sources ==
- Landesamt für Denkmalpflege Rheinland-Pfalz, Verwaltung der staatlichen Schlösser (Hrsg.): Staatliche Burgen, Schlösser und Altertümer in Rheinland-Pfalz. 6. überarbeitete und erweiterte Auflage. Mainz, 1997.
