= Arnold II of Boulogne =

Arnold II is a Count of Boulogne identified by Morton and Muntz (page xxxi note 7) as the one slain in battle by Count Enguerrand I of Ponthieu. Frank Barlow (page xliii note 125) prefers to retain the traditional identification of the slain count as Baldwin I of Boulogne. However, he admits that the identification is "uncertain." In any case, the widow (Adelvie?) of Baldwin / Arnold then married Count Enguerrand I.
