= Henry III of Limburg =

Wallonian noble (c. 1140–1221)

Henry III
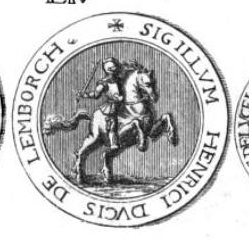

Duke of Limburg and Count of Arlon
- Reign: 1165–1221
- Predecessor: Henry II
- Successor: Waleran III
- Born: c. 1140
- Died: 21 June 1221
- Noble family: House of Limburg
- Spouses: Sophia of Saarbrücken; Adelaide of Henneberg
- Issue: Waleran III
- Father: Henry II
- Mother: Matilda of Saffenberg

Henry III (c. 1140 – 21 June 1221) was the duke of Limburg and count of Arlon from 1165 to his death. He was the son and successor of Henry II and Matilda of Saffenberg.

In 1172, he fought against the count of Luxembourg, Henry the Blind, and then his ally, the count of Hainaut, Baldwin V. The environs of Arlon were devastated and the duke, overcome, had to recompense the count of Luxembourg for the wrongs he had done him. In 1183, he supported the election of Folmar of Karden as archbishop of Trier. This was opposed by the emperor, Frederick Barbarossa.

In 1213, Henry faced his nephew duke Henry I of Brabant at the battle of Steppes. The duke of Brabant's army broke and ran. Henry later supported Otto of Brunswick over Philip of Swabia as king of Germany and imperial claimant. He fought at the Battle of Bouvines in 1214 for Otto of Brunswick, while his son Waleran sided with King Philip II of France.

He married Sophia of Saarbrücken, daughter of the count Simon I of Saarbrücken. Their son, Waleran III, succeeded him.

== Sources ==
- Baldwin, John W. (2002). Aristocratic Life in Medieval France: The Romances of Jean Renart and Gerbert de Montreuil, 1190-1230. The Johns Hopkins University Press.
- Loud, Graham A.; Schenk, Jochen, eds. (2017). The Origins of the German Principalities, 1100-1350: Essays by German Historians. Routledge.
- Schnerb, Bertrand (2010). "Battle of Steppes". In Rogers, Clifford J. (ed.). The Oxford Encyclopedia of Medieval Warfare and Military Technology. Vol. 3. Oxford University Press.

Henry III of Limburg House of Ardennes-Verdun Born: c. 1140 Died: 21 June 1221
Preceded by Henry II	Duke of Limburg; 1165–1221	Succeeded by Waleran III
Preceded by Henry II	Count of Arlon; 1165–1221	Succeeded by Waleran III
