= Henry II of Leez =

Prince-Bishop of Liege

Henry II of Leez (died 4 September 1164) was prince-bishop of Liège from 1145 until his death. He supported the Emperor Frederick I Barbarossa in his quarrel with Pope Adrian IV and Pope Alexander III. In April 1164 he gave the episcopal consecration to Antipope Paschal III.
