= Lipporn =

- Municipality
- Coat of arms

- Location of Lipporn within Rhein-Lahn-Kreis district
- Interactive map of Lipporn
- Location within Germany Location within Rhineland-Palatinate
- Coordinates: 50°8′28″N 7°51′50″E
- Country: Germany
- State: Rhineland-Palatinate
- District: Rhein-Lahn-Kreis
- Municipal assoc.: Nastätten

Government
  - Mayor (2019–24): Nina Berghäuser

Area
  - Total: 4.8 km^{2} (1.9 sq mi)
- Elevation: 415 m (1,362 ft)

Population (2025-12-31)
  - Total: 267
  - Density: 56/km^{2} (140/sq mi)
- Time zone: UTC+01:00 (CET)
  - Summer (DST): UTC+02:00 (CEST)
- Postal codes: 56357
- Dialling codes: 06775
- Vehicle registration: EMS, DIZ, GOH

Lipporn (German pronunciation: [ˈlɪpɔʁn]) is a municipality in the district of Rhein-Lahn, in Rhineland-Palatinate, in western Germany. It is notable for Dudo of Laurenburg, a 12th-century Lord of Lipporn, who was a founder of the House of Nassau, an aristocratic dynasty in Europe that includes the monarchs of the Netherlands.
