= Dudo of Laurenburg =

German noble (born 1060 died 1123)

- Born: c. 1060; Laurenburg
- Died: before 1124; Nassau
- Noble family: House of Nassau
- Spouse: Anastasia von Arnstein
- Issue: Rupert I of Laurenburg; Arnold I of Laurenburg; Demudis
- Father: Rupert?

Dudo of Laurenburg (German: Dudo von Laurenburg, Latin: Tuto de Lurinburg; c. 1060–before 1124), was probably Count of Laurenburg and is considered the founder of the House of Nassau. The House of Nassau would become one of the reigning families in Germany, from which are descended through females the present-day royals of the Netherlands and Luxembourg, while officially belonging to this House.

== Life ==
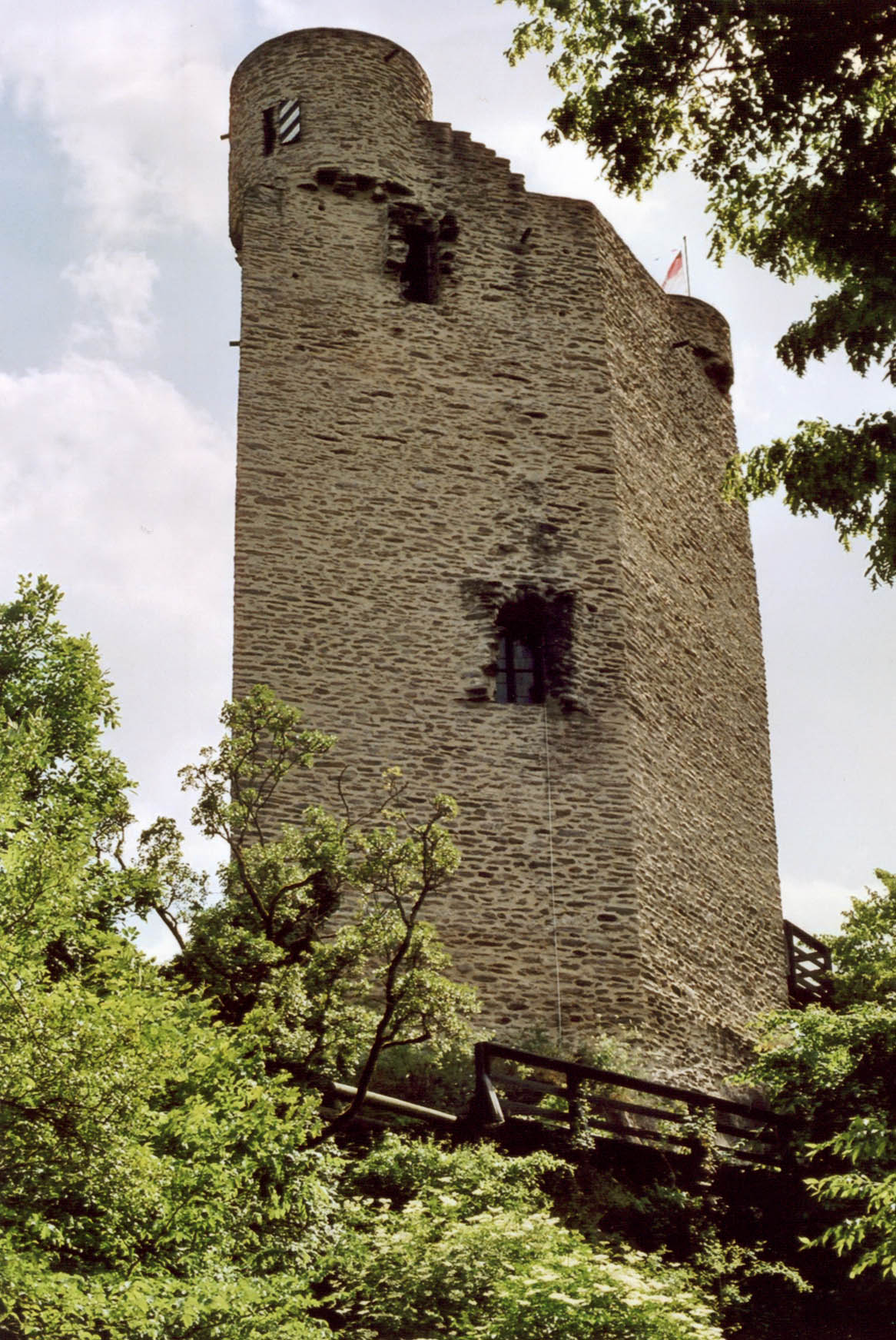
Laurenburg Castle

Dudo was a son of Rupert (German: Ruprecht), the Archbishop of Mainz’s Vogt in Siegerland. Dudo is mentioned as Tuto de Lurinburg between 1093 and 1117. In a charter dated 1134 (after his death) he is mentioned as Count of Laurenburg.

Dudo was lord or Vogt of Lipporn and Miehlen and owned large parts of the lands of Lipporn/Laurenburg. There are more persons known who, as owners of the lands of Lipporn/Laurenburg (and thus the predecessors of Dudo), probably also were his ancestors. The first is a certain Drutwin mentioned in 881 as a landowner in Prüm, and who is the oldest known possible ancestor of the House of Nassau.

Dudo built the castle of Laurenburg around 1090. In 1117, Dudo donated land to Schaffhausen Abbey for construction of a monastery in Lipporn. This monastery, built under Dudo's son Rupert I in 1126, was the Benedictine Schönau Abbey. From 1141 until her death in 1164, the abbey would be the home of St. Elizabeth of Schönau.

In 1122, Dudo received the castle of Idstein in the Taunus as a fief under the Archbishopric of Mainz. This was part of the inheritance of Count Udalrich of Idstein-Eppstein. He also received the Vogtship of the richly endowed Benedictine Bleidenstadt Abbey (in present-day Taunusstein).

== Marriage and children ==
Dudo married the fourth of the seven daughters of Count Louis I of Arnstein, possibly her name was Irmgardis or Demudis. Three children were born of this union:

1. Rupert I of Laurenburg (died before 13 May 1154), mentioned as Count of Laurenburg 1124–1152.
2. Arnold I of Laurenburg (died before 1154), mentioned as Count of Laurenburg 1124–1148.
3. Demudis, who married Count Emich of Diez

== Sources ==
- Dek, A.W.E. (1970). Genealogie van het Vorstenhuis Nassau [Genealogy of the Royal House of Nassau] (in Dutch). Zaltbommel: Europese Bibliotheek. OCLC 27365371.
- Hesselfelt, H.F.J. (1965). "De oudste generaties van het Huis Nassau" [The oldest generations of the House of Nassau]. De Nederlandsche Leeuw, Maandblad van Het Koninklijk Nederlandsch Genootschap voor Geslacht- en Wapenkunde [The Dutch Lion, Monthly Journal of the Royal Dutch Society for Genealogy and Heraldry] (in Dutch). 1965 (11): 354–365.
- Lück, Alfred (1981) [1967]. Siegerland und Nederland [Siegerland and The Netherlands] (in German) (2nd ed.). Siegen: Siegerländer Heimatverein e.V.
- Schwennicke, Detlev (1998). Europäische Stammtafeln, Neue Folge [European Genealogies, New Series] (in German). Vol. Band I. Frankfurt am Main: Vittorio Klostermann GmbH. ISBN 3-465-02743-4. Table 60.
- Thiele, Andreas (1994). Erzählende genealogische Stammtafeln zur europäischen Geschichte, Band I, Teilband 2: Deutsche Kaiser-, Königs-, Herzogs- und Grafenhäuser II [Annotated genealogies from European History, Volume 1, Part 2: German Imperial, Royal, Ducal and Comital Houses II] (in German) (2nd ed.). Frankfurt am Main: RG Fischer Verlag. ISBN 3-89501-023-5.
- Venne, J.M. van de; Stols, Alexander A.M. (1937). Geslachts-Register van het Vorstenhuis Nassau [Genealogy of the Princely House of Nassau] (in Dutch). Maastricht: A.A.M. Stols’ Uitgevers-Maatschappij.
- Vorsterman van Oyen, A.A. (1882). Het vorstenhuis Oranje-Nassau. Van de vroegste tijden tot heden [The Princely House of Orange-Nassau. From the earliest days until the present] (in Dutch). Leiden & Utrecht: A.W. Sijthoff & J.L. Beijers.
