= Laurenburg =

- Municipality
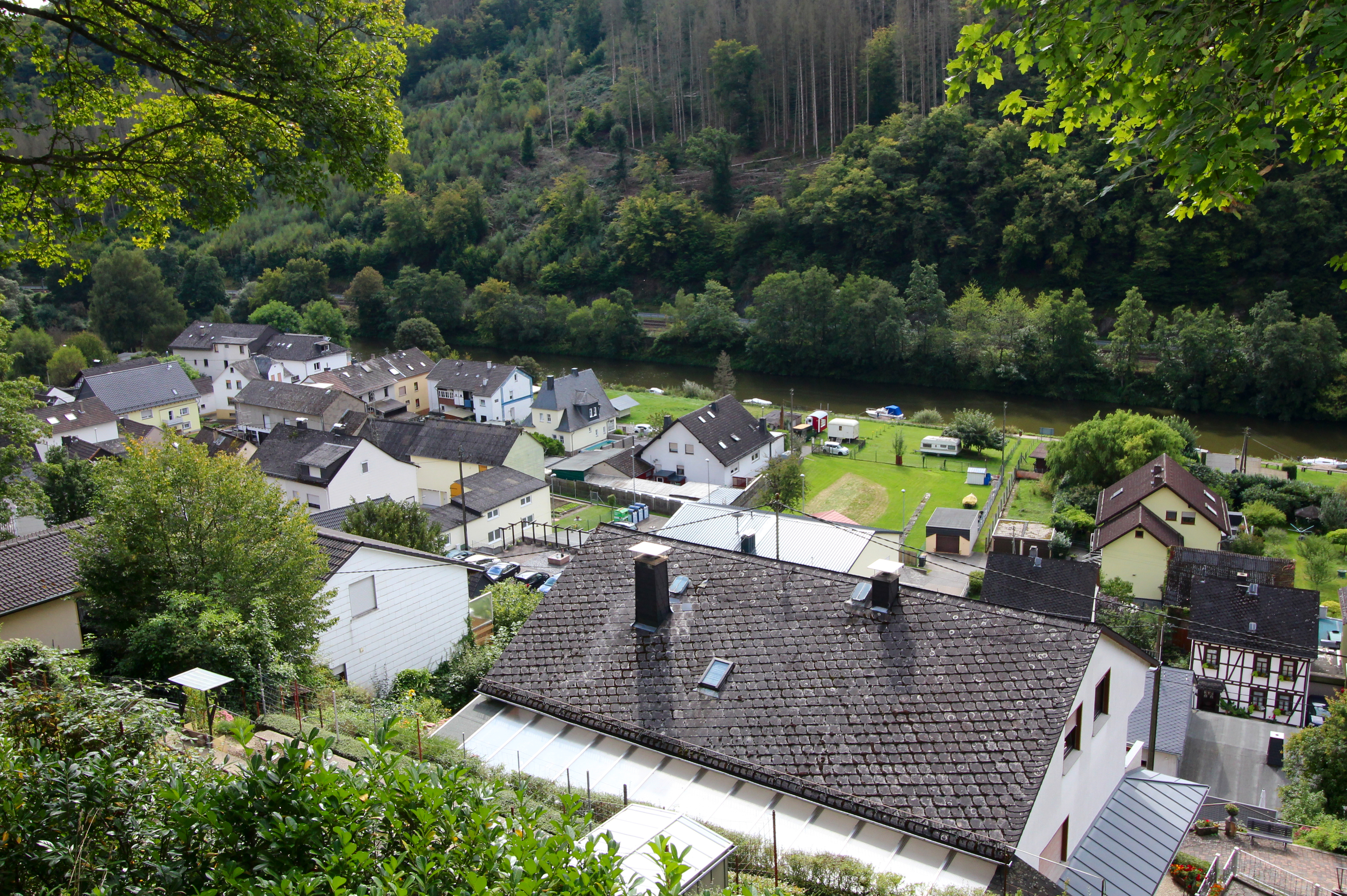

- Coat of arms

- Location of Laurenburg within Rhein-Lahn-Kreis district
- Interactive map of Laurenburg
- Location within Germany Location within Rhineland-Palatinate
- Coordinates: 50°19′56″N 7°54′41″E
- Country: Germany
- State: Rhineland-Palatinate
- District: Rhein-Lahn-Kreis
- Municipal assoc.: Diez

Government
  - Mayor (2019–24): Ralf Würges

Area
  - Total: 2.16 km^{2} (0.83 sq mi)
- Elevation: 100 m (330 ft)

Population (2025-12-31)
  - Total: 261
  - Density: 121/km^{2} (313/sq mi)
- Time zone: UTC+01:00 (CET)
  - Summer (DST): UTC+02:00 (CEST)
- Postal codes: 56379
- Dialling codes: 06439
- Vehicle registration: EMS, DIZ, GOH
- Website: www.laurenburg.de

Laurenburg (German pronunciation: [ˈlaʊʁənbʊʁk]) is a municipality in the Rhein-Lahn district of Rhineland-Palatinate, in western Germany. The town, a health resort situated in the lower Lahn River valley, belongs to the Diez Municipal Association.

== History ==
Laurenburg Castle is first mentioned in 1093 in the purported founding charter of the Maria Laach Abbey (a document some historians consider fabricated). A "Comes Dudo de Lurenburch", believed to be Dudo of Laurenburg (ca. 1060 - ca. 1123), is listed fifth on the witness list. Dudo, considered the founder of the aristocratic House of Nassau, is thought to be the builder of the castle (perhaps with his father Rupert, the Archbishop of Mainz's Vogt in Siegerland).

The seat of the House of Nassau was moved, under Dudo's sons Rupert I and Arnold I, to Nassau Castle around 1124. The original castle in Laurenburg was destroyed in the Thirty Years War (1618–1648) and remains a ruin. The donjon of the castle today houses a military museum.

After the removal of the ruling House of Nassau from Laurenburg, the castle was administered by a Burgmann of Nassau, whose descendants are still named "von Laurenburg" today. Among them, the families of the Loeners and the Buchers are well-known today. In 1643 Reichsgraf Peter Melander of Holzappel, an imperial field marshal during the Thirty Years' War, acquired Laurenburg, along with the greater area known as the Esterau.

Schloss Laurenburg ("Laurenburg palace") was first mentioned in documents in 1343. It has been occupied by, among others, Reichsgraf Peter Melander of Holzappel, Prince Adolph of Nassau-Dillenburg, Prince Leberecht of Anhalt-Bernburg, and the Archdukes Joseph and Stephen of Austria. At the beginning of the 18th century, it became the summer residence of the Prince of Anhalt-Bernburg-Schaumburg-Hoym. In 1859, it came into the possession of the Holzappel Silver and Lead Mining Society.

In 1795, Laurenburg was temporarily occupied by the French. In 1806, it became part of the Duchy of Nassau, which was itself annexed by Prussia in 1866. Since 1947, it has been part of the federal state of Rheinland-Palatinate.

Viticulture in Laurenburg was first documented in 1445, with the establishment of a vineyard at the Taubenhaus of Count Philip the Elder of Katzenelnbogen under the castle.

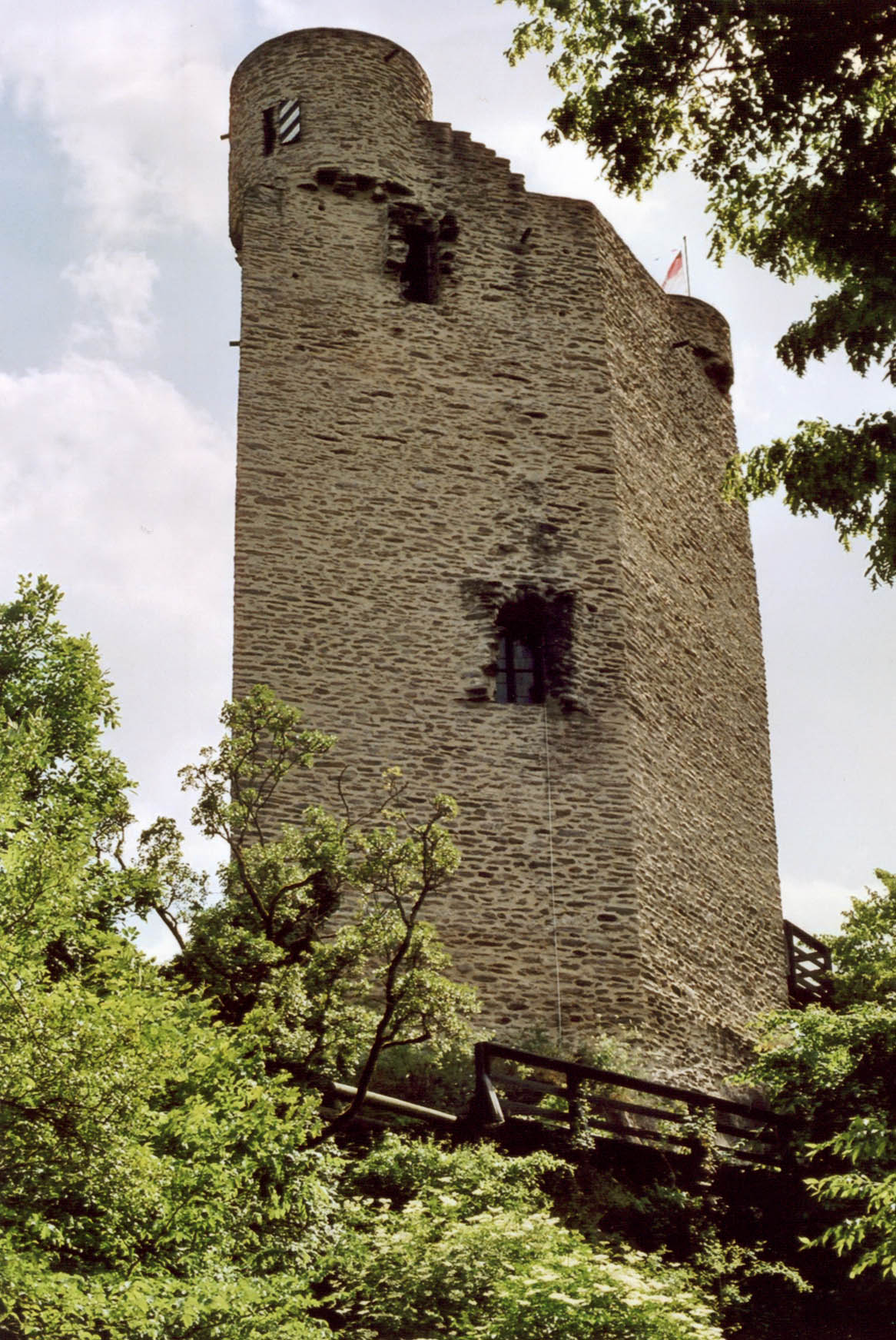
Residential tower of Laurenburg Castle

== Religious life ==
Laurenburg is part of the Roman Catholic parish of St. Boniface in Holzappel. The parish belongs to the Diez Pastoral Area of the Limburg district in the Diocese of Limburg.

The Protestant community is part of Holzappel parish, which belongs to the Diez Deanery of the South Nassau Provostship of the Evangelical Church in Hesse and Nassau (EKHN).

== Transport ==
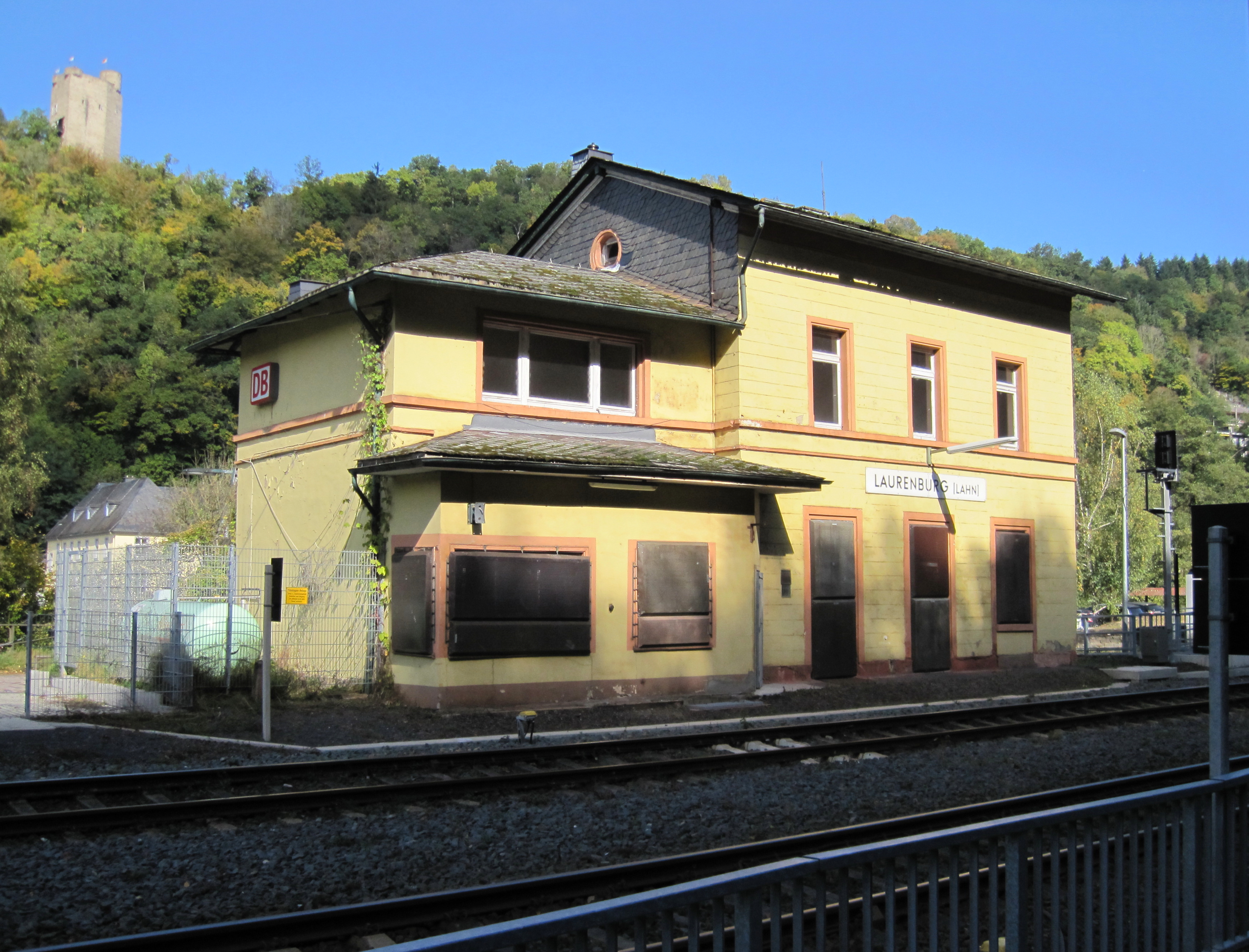
Laurenburg station

In Laurenburg there's a train station of Lahn Valley Railway operated by linr numbrr RB23 of section Lahn-Eifel-Bahn of Deutsche Bahn.
