= Waleran, Duke of Lower Lorraine =

Count of Arlon and Limburg (c. 1085–1139)

Waleran
- Count of Arlon and Limburg; Duke of Lower Lorraine
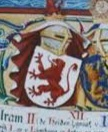
- Coronation: 1128
- Successor: Godfrey VII
- Born: c. 1085
- Died: 6 August 1139 (aged 54)?
- Spouse: Jutta von Wassenberg (c. 1087 – 1151)
- Issue Detail: Henry II, Duke of Limburg; Beatrix of Limburg
- House: House of Limburg
- Father: Henry, Duke of Lower Lorraine (1101–1106)
- Mother: Adelheid von Botenstein

Waleran II (or Walram II) (c. 1085 – 1139), also called Paganus, probably due to a late baptism, was the Duke of Limburg and Count of Arlon from his father's death in about 1119 until his own twenty years later. He was given the Duchy of Lower Lorraine by Lothair III, Holy Roman Emperor in 1128 after the latter's accession as King of Germany in 1125.

== Life ==
Waleran was the son of Henry, Duke of Lower Lorraine (1101–1106), and Adelaide of Pottenstein (Adelheid von Botenstein). Henry had been forced to yield the duchy to Godfrey I of Leuven on Henry V's succession, but had kept the ducal title. With the coming of Lothair, Godfrey was forced to yield it to Waleran. Godfrey was not willing to do so and war broke out, especially over disputes about the advocats of the abbey of Sint-Truiden, the Counts of Duras. In 1129, Waleran and the bishop of Liège, Alexandre de Juliers, defeated Godfrey's forces at Wilderen, near Duras, but Brabant and Duras subsequently continued to fight until they came to terms three years later. Though Waleran and Godfrey eventually reconciled, Godfrey continued to use the ducal title.

== Marriage ==
Waleran married Jutta von Wassenberg sometime between 1107–10, daughter of Gerard I of Guelders. In 1129, Waleran was made forester of Duisbourg. In 1139, Lothair died and Waleran supported Conrad of Hohenstaufen, who was elected. He remained faithful to the new king until his death shortly thereafter. He was succeeded by Godfrey II of Leuven in Lorraine.

Waleran and Jutta's children included:

- Henry II, Duke of Limburg (d. Rome, Aug 1167), Count of Arlon from 1139 and Duke of Limburg from 1140
- Gerhard van Limburg, who married Elizabeth [unknown] and had a child, Gerhard (1148– )
- Beatrix van Limburg (– 12 July, after 1164), who married Rupert I, Count of Laurenburg (d. before 13 May 1154),
- Walram van Limburg (d. 5 Jan 1147)
- a daughter (d. 1150/51) who married Ekbert, Graf von Tecklenburg.

== Sources ==
- Bijsterveld, Arnoud-Jan (1999). "Gift exchange, landed property and eternity. The foundation and endowment of the Promonstratensian priory of Postel (1128/1138-1179)". In Theuws, Frans; Roymans, Nico (eds.). Land and Ancestors: Cultural Dynamics in the Urnfield Period and the Middle Ages in the southern Netherlands. Amsterdamn University Press. pp. 331–348.
- Gislebertus (of Mons) (2005). Chronicle of Hainaut. Translated by Napran, Laura. The Boydell Press.
- Loud, Graham A.; Schenk, Jochen, eds. (2017). The Origins of the German Principalities, 1100-1350: Essays by German Historians. Routledge.

Regnal titles
Preceded by Godfrey VI	Duke of Lower Lorraine; 1125–1139	Succeeded by Godfrey VII
