= List of counts and dukes of Limburg =

Coat of arms of the Dukes of Limburg

The counts of Limburg ruled a medieval county with its capital at Limbourg-sur-Vesdre, lying between Liège and Aachen. They rose to prominence when one of them was appointed Duke of Lower Lorraine. Though Lorraine was later confiscated, the ducal title was kept within the family, transferred to the County of Limburg, and this was eventually ratified by the Holy Roman Emperor. Thereafter, the dukes of Limburg were one of several claimant lines of heirs to the title of the old duke of Lower Lorraine. Their title was eventually inherited by their competitors, the dukes of Brabant, and became part of the large collection of titles of the Burgundian Netherlands, eventually passing to the Habsburgs.

After the occupation in 1794 by the French, the old Austrian Duchy of Limburg was disbanded and the largest part was absorbed into the département of Ourthe (which became the province of Liège). Only a small northern part belonged to the département of Meuse-Inférieure and thus to the later province of Limburg. The title "Duke of Limburg" was nevertheless revived after the foundation of the new Duchy of Limburg as a result of the Treaty of London in 1839. According to this treaty the new duchy (without the cities of Maastricht and Venlo), was joined to the German Confederation. After the collapse of this confederation in 1866, Limburg as a duchy ceased to exist and became a province of the Kingdom of the Netherlands.

== Counts of Limburg (1065–1119) ==
=== House of Ardennes ===
- 1065–1082: (Note: The years represent when they were Counts, not their birth and death years) Waleran I (received Limburg through his wife Judith, daughter of Frederick, Duke of Lower Lorraine)
- 1082–1116: Henry I (son of, also Duke of Lower Lorraine)

== Dukes of Limburg (1119–1794) ==
=== House of Ardennes ===
- 1119–1139: (Note: The years represent when they were Dukes, not their birth and death years) Waleran II (son of, also kept the ducal title his father had been granted as ruler of Lower Lorraine; also Count of Arlon [ fr ]
- 1139–1170: Henry II (son of, also Count of Arlon [ de ]
- 1170–1221: Henry III (son of, also Count of Arlon)
- 1221–1226: Waleran III (son of, also Count of Arlon and Lord of Monjoie)
- 1226–1247: Henry IV (son of, also Count of Berg and Lord of Monjoie)
- 1247–1279: Waleran IV (son of)
- 1279–1283: Ermengarde (daughter of, married Reginald I, Duke of Guelders)

The Duchy of Limburg was lost in 1288 to the dukes of Brabant in the Battle of Worringen.

=== House of Leuven ===
- 1288–1294: John I (also Duke of Brabant and Dukes of Lothier)
- 1294–1312: John II (son of, also Duke of Brabant and Dukes of Lothier)
- 1312–1355: John III (son of, also Duke of Brabant and Dukes of Lothier)
- 1355–1406: Joanna (daughter of, married)

=== House of Valois-Burgundy ===
- 1404–1415: Anthony (great-nephew of)
- 1415–1426: John IV (son of)
- 1427–1430: Philip I also called Philip of Saint Pol - (brother of)
- 1430–1467: Philip II also called Philip the Good (cousin of)
- 1467–1477: Charles I also called Charles the Bold (son of)
- 1477–1482: Mary (daughter of, married Maximilian I, Holy Roman Emperor, regent from 1482 until 1494)

=== House of Habsburg ===
- 1493–1506: Philip III also called Philip the Handsome - (son of)
- 1506–1555: Charles II (son of, also Holy Roman Emperor and King of Spain)

After the abdication of Charles II, the Seventeen Provinces went to the Spanish branch of the House of Habsburg.

- 1555–1598: Philip IV (son of, also King of Spain)
- 1598–1621: Isabella and Albert (daughter and son-in-law of)
- 1621–1665: Philip V (nephew of)
- 1665–1700: Charles III (son of, also King of Spain)
- 1700–1706: Philip VI (cousin of, also King of Spain)

After the death of Philip VI the Seventeen Provinces returned to the Austrian branch of the House of Habsburg.

- 1706–1740: Charles IV (cousin of, also Holy Roman Emperor)
- 1740–1780: Maria Theresa (daughter of, also Queen of Hungary and Bohemia)

=== House of Habsburg-Lorraine ===
- 1780–1789: Joseph (son of, also Holy Roman Emperor)
- 1790–1792: Leopold (brother of, also Holy Roman Emperor)
- 1792–1794: Francis also called Double Emperor (son of, also Holy Roman Emperor and Emperor of Austria)

== Dukes of Limburg (1839–1866) ==
=== House of Orange-Nassau ===
- 1839–1840: William I (also King of the Netherlands and Grand Duke of Luxembourg)
- 1840–1849: William II (also King of the Netherlands and Grand Duke of Luxembourg)
- 1849–1866: William III (also King of the Netherlands and Grand Duke of Luxembourg)

== See also ==
- Duchess of Limburg
- Duchy of Limburg
- Duchy of Limburg (1839-1867)

== Bibliography ==
- Anderson, James (1732). Royal Genealogies; or, the Genealogical Tables of Emperors, Kings, and Princes, from Adam to these times. London.
