= Gerard I of Guelders =

Gerard I, Count of Guelders (c. 1060 – 8 March 1129) was Count of Guelders from 1096 until his death in 1129 (Gelre in Dutch). He was the son of Theodoric of Wassenberg.

He may have been married to Clementia of Aquitaine, although that proposed marriage seems to be based on a falsified document. It is also possible that he married a daughter of William I, Count of Burgundy whose name is not known. Gerard had three children:

- Jutta of Wassenberg, married Waleran II of Limburg
- Yolande of Wassenberg (Yolande of Guelders), married 1) Baldwin III, Count of Hainaut and 2) Godfrey II de Ribemont Châtelain de Valenciennes
- Gerard II, Count of Guelders, married Ermengarde of Zutphen, daughter of Otto II, Count of Zutphen.

== Sources ==
- Gilbert of Mons (2005). Chronicle of Hainaut. Translated by Napran, Laura. Boydell Press.
- Vanderkindere, Leon, ed. (1904). La Chronique de Gislebert de Mons (in French). Librairie Kiessling.

Preceded by none	Count of Guelders; 1096–1129	Succeeded by Gerard II
