= Elizabeth of Leiningen =

German countess

- Born: Unknown
- Died: 20 June 1235/38
- Noble family: House of Leiningen
- Spouse: Rupert III, Count of Nassau
- Issue Detail: Herman, Count of Nassau
- Father: Emich III, Count of Leiningen
- Mother: ?

Elizabeth of Leiningen, German: Elisabeth von Leiningen (died 20 June 1235/38), was a countess of the House of Leiningen and by marriage countess of Nassau. As widow she used the title countess of Schowenburg.

== Life ==
Coat-of-arms of the counts of Leiningen

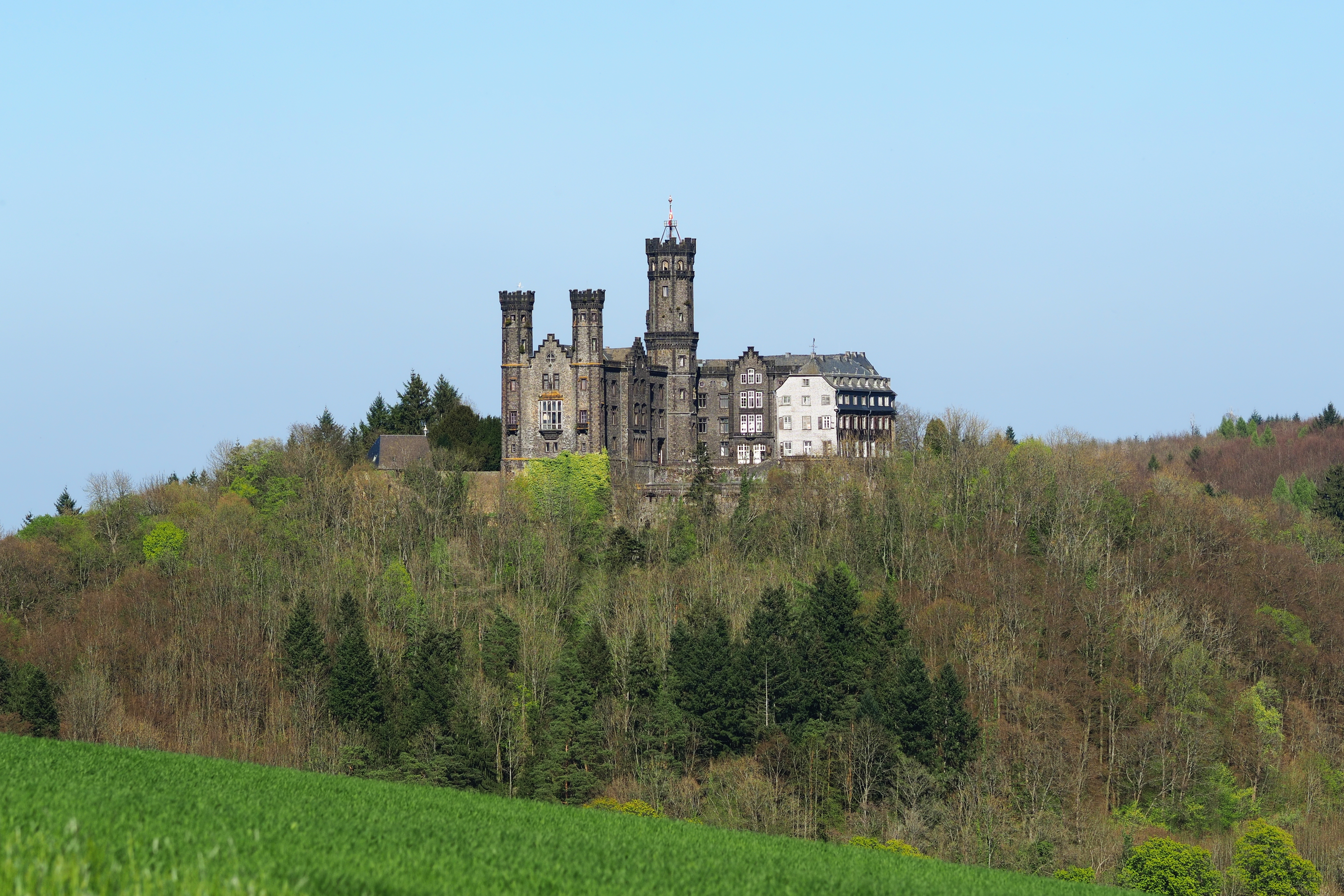
Schaumburg Castle from the south west

Elizabeth was a daughter of Count Emich III of Leiningen. (Note: Dek (1970), Hesselfelt (1965) and Van de Venne & Stols (1937) mention that Lucardis married firstly c. 1200 to Gebhard IV of Querfurt, Viscount of Magdeburg (died Querfurt, 1213) and secondly in 1214 to Herman V, Count of Virneburg. Given the dating of a charter (27 February 1204) in which Lucardis' mother sells property with the consent of Herman of Virneburg and his wife Lucardis, Lucardis and Herman cannot have married in 1214. And because Gebhard of Querfurt died in 1213, his marriage to Lucardis is highly unlikely. Vorsterman van Oyen (1882) only mentions Lucardis' marriage to Herman of Virneburg.) She married in or before 1169 to Rupert III ‘the Bellicose’ of Nassau (died 23/28 December 1191). From this union came the following children:

1. Herman (died 16 July before 1206), count of Nassau 1190–1192.
2. Lucardis (died before 1222), she married before 27 February 1204 to Herman III, Count of Virneburg (died after 1254). (Note: Dek (1970), Hesselfelt (1965) and Van de Venne & Stols (1937) mention that Lucardis married firstly c. 1200 to Gebhard IV of Querfurt, Viscount of Magdeburg (died Querfurt, 1213) and secondly in 1214 to Herman V, Count of Virneburg. Vorsterman van Oyen (1882) only mentions Lucardis' marriage to Herman of Virneburg.)

Elizabeth's husband is mentioned as count of Nassau between 1160 and 1190. He took part in the Third Crusade (1189–1190) with Emperor Frederick I Barbarossa. It seems that he stayed until the end of the siege of Akko and then died on the way back at sea.

‘Elysa comitissa dicta de Schowenburg, relicta … Ruperti comitis de Nassowe’ sold property to Johannisberg Abbey with consent of ‘Hermanni comitis de Virneburg et Luccardis conthoralis ipsius filie nostre advocatiam et iudicium ville Steinheim’ by charter dated 27 February 1204.

At the death of her brother Count Frederick II of Leiningen c. 1217/20 Elizabeth inherited one third of Schaumburg Castle near Balduinstein and its Herrschaft. After her death her part came into the possession of her grandsons, the Counts Rupert I and Henry I of Virneburg.

‘Lucardis comitissa de Sarebrugen … cum sororibus nostris Alverade quondam comitissa de Cleberc et Elysa quondam etiam comitissa de Nassowe’ donated property to Limburg Cathedral in a charter dated 1235.

The necrology of Arnstein Abbey records the death of ‘Elizabetis comitisse de Nassauwe, que legavit nobis elemosinam bonam’ on 20 June.

== Sources ==
- This article was translated from the corresponding Dutch Wikipedia article, as of 2020-12-18.
- Dek, A.W.E. (1970). Genealogie van het Vorstenhuis Nassau [Genealogy of the Royal House of Nassau] (in Dutch). Zaltbommel: Europese Bibliotheek. OCLC 27365371.
- Hesselfelt, H.F.J. (1965). "De oudste generaties van het Huis Nassau" [The oldest generations of the House of Nassau]. De Nederlandsche Leeuw, Maandblad van het Koninklijk Nederlandsch Genootschap voor Geslacht- en Wapenkunde [The Dutch Lion, Monthly Journal of the Royal Dutch Society for Genealogy and Heraldry] (in Dutch). 1965 (11): 354–365.
- Lück, Alfred (1981) [1967]. Siegerland und Nederland [Siegerland and The Netherlands] (in German) (2nd ed.). Siegen: Siegerländer Heimatverein e.V.
- Sauer, Wilhelm (1889). "Ruprecht III., Graf von Laurenburg-Nassau" [Ruprecht III, Count of Laurenburg-Nassau]. Allgemeine Deutsche Biographie [Universal German Biography] (in German). Vol. Band 29. Leipzig: Duncker & Humblot. pp. 730–731.
- Venne, J.M. van de; Stols, Alexander A.M. (1937). Geslachts-Register van het Vorstenhuis Nassau [Genealogy of the Royal House of Nassau] (in Dutch). Maastricht: A.A.M. Stols’ Uitgevers-Maatschappij.
- Vorsterman van Oyen, A.A. (1882). Het vorstenhuis Oranje-Nassau. Van de vroegste tijden tot heden [The Royal House of Orange-Nassau. From the earliest days until the present] (in Dutch). Leiden & Utrecht: A.W. Sijthoff & J.L. Beijers.
