= John I of Nassau =

John I of Nassau may refer to:

- John I, Bishop-Elect of Utrecht (died 1309)
- John I, Count of Nassau-Beilstein (died 1473)
- John I, Count of Nassau-Siegen (c. 1339–1416)
- John I, Count of Nassau-Weilburg (1309–1371)
