= Matilda of Guelders =

Matilda of Guelders and Zutphen
- Born: Unknown
- Died: 28 October 1247 or later
- Noble family: House of Wassenberg
- Spouse: Henry II "the Rich" of Nassau
- Issue Detail: Walram II, Count of Nassau; Otto I, Count of Nassau; Henry; Elizabeth; Gerhard of Nassau; John I, Bishop-Elect of Utrecht
- Father: Otto I, Count of Guelders and Zutphen
- Mother: Richardis of Bavaria

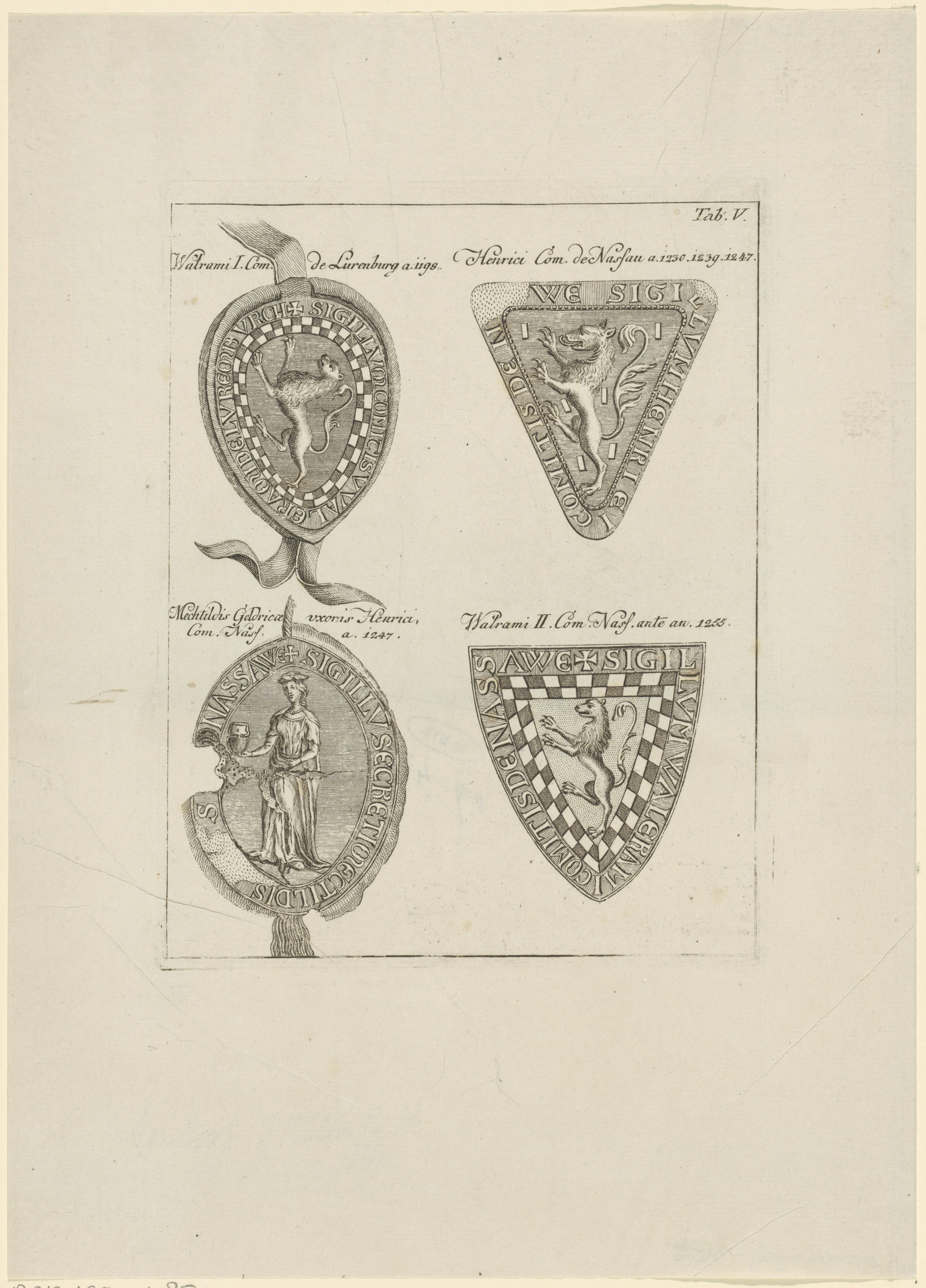
Noble seals from the twelfth century; Matilda’s is on the left, bottom row.

Matilda of Guelders and Zutphen (died 28 October 1247, or later), was a countess from the House of Wassenberg and by marriage countess of Nassau. She is a direct ancestor of both the Kings of the Netherlands and the Grand Dukes of Luxembourg.

== Life ==
Matilda was the youngest daughter of Count Otto I of Guelders and Zutphen and Richardis of Bavaria, daughter of Otto I Wittelsbach, Duke of Bavaria and Agnes of Loon.

Matilda is among others mentioned in the following charters:

- A charter dated 11 December 1215, in which ‘Heinricus et Roppertus comites de Nassovva’ with the consent of ‘uxorum nostrarum Methildis et Gertrudis’ bought property from Mainz Cathedral.
- A charter dated 9 June 1239, in which ‘Heinricus … comes de Nassowe … collateralis nostra … Methildis’ confirmed the dependence of ‘ecclesie in Nepphe’ to Arnstein Abbey.
- A charter dated 20 July 1245, in which ‘Henricus comes de Nassowe et Methildis comitissa uxor eiusdem, Walramus primogenitus, ceterique liberi eorundem’ donated tolls from a bridge to Altenberg Abbey.
- A charter dated 1247, in which ‘Heinricus comes de Nassowe et Mectildis comitissa’ donated ‘ecclesiam in Inferi[ori] Diffenbach’ to Arnstein Abbey, witnessed by ‘filiorum nostrorum Walerami, Ottonis, Henrici, Gerardi, Johannis’.

The necrology of Arnstein Abbey records the death of ‘Mecktildis comitisse de Nassauw sororis nostre’ on 28 October. She is last mentioned in a charter from 1247, therefore she died on 28 October in 1247 or a later year.

== Marriage and children ==
Matilda married before 11 December 1215 to Count Henry II "the Rich" of Nassau (c. 1180 – 26 April 1247/48/49/50, before 25 January 1251).
From this marriage were born:

1. Rupert (died 19 September before 1247), was granted allod in Diez and Ober-Lahnstein by the Archbishop of Trier, was a knight of the Teutonic Order.
2. Walram II (c. 1220 – 24 January 1276), succeeded his father as Count of Nassau, is the ancestor of the Walramian Line of the House of Nassau.
3. Otto I (died between 3 May 1289 and 19 March 1290), succeeded his father as Count of Nassau, is the ancestor of the Ottonian Line of the House of Nassau.
4. Henry (died 28 May after 1247), was a monk in Arnstein Abbey.
5. Elizabeth (c. 1225 – after 6 January 1295), married Gerhard III, Lord of Eppstein (died 1252).
6. Gerhard (died between 7 April 1312 and 20 September 1314), was a clergyman.
7. John (died Deventer, 13 July 1309), was Bishop-Elect of Utrecht 1267–1290.
8. Catharine (died 27 April 1324), became Abbess of Altenberg Abbey near Wetzlar in 1249.
9. Jutta (died 1313), married around 1260 to John I, Lord of Cuijk (died 13 July 1308).
10. ? Irmgard (died 1 August 1297), was Abbess of Val-Benoît.

== Sources ==
- Dek, A.W.E. (1970). Genealogie van het Vorstenhuis Nassau [Genealogy of the Royal House of Nassau] (in Dutch). Zaltbommel: Europese Bibliotheek. OCLC 27365371.
- Schilfgaarde, A.P. van (1967). Zegels en genealogische gegevens van de graven en hertogen van Gelre, graven van Zutphen [Seals and Genealogical Data of the Counts and Dukes of Guelders, Counts of Zutphen] (in Dutch). Arnhem: S. Gouda Quint - D. Brouwer en Zoon.
- Venne, J.M. van der; Stols, Alexander A.M. (1937). "Gerhard graaf van Nassau, 1259-1313. De oudst bekende Nassau in Nederland?" [Gerhard Count of Nassau, 1259-1313. The eldest known Nassau in the Netherlands?]. De Nederlandsche Leeuw, Maandblad van het Koninklijk Nederlandsch Genootschap voor Geslacht- en Wapenkunde [The Dutch Lion, Monthly Journal of the Royal Dutch Society for Genealogy and Heraldry] (in Dutch). 1937 (2).
- Vorsterman van Oyen, A.A. (1882). Het vorstenhuis Oranje-Nassau. Van de vroegste tijden tot heden [The Royal House of Orange-Nassau. From the earliest days until the present] (in Dutch). Leiden & Utrecht: A.W. Sijthoff & J.L. Beijers.
