= Dillenburg Castle =

Castle in Dillenburg, Gießen, Germany

Coordinates: 50.7383°N 8.2853°E

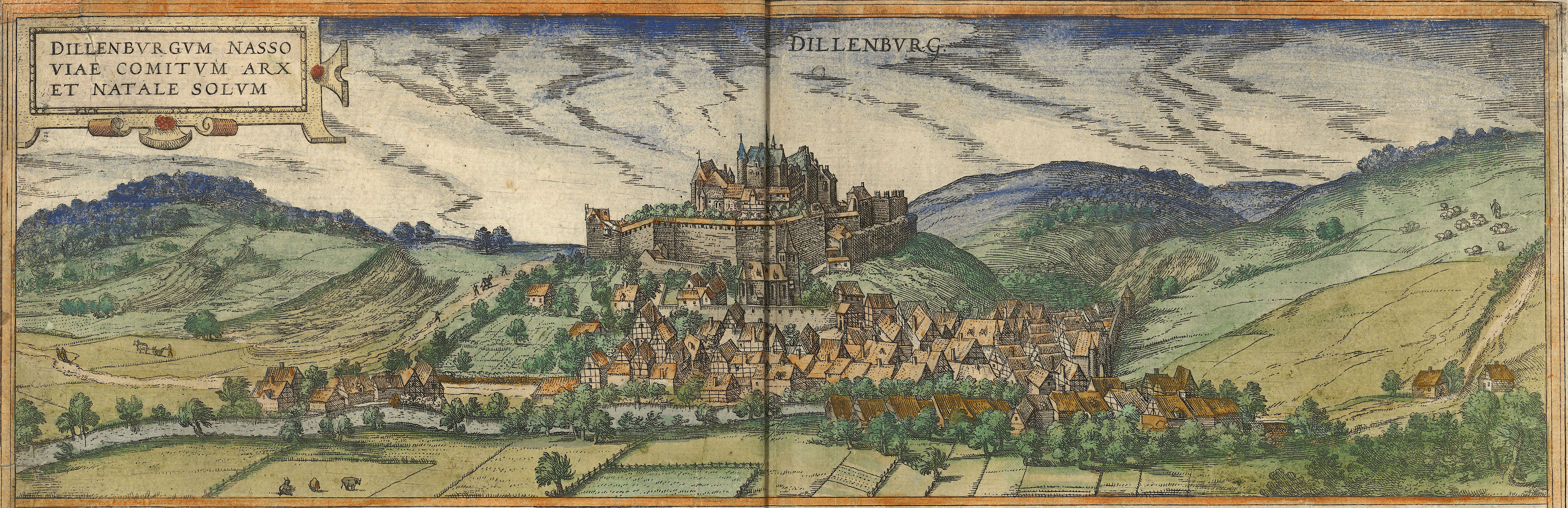
Dillenburg in 1575, showing the old castle at the top of the hill and the St. Johanniskirche below it

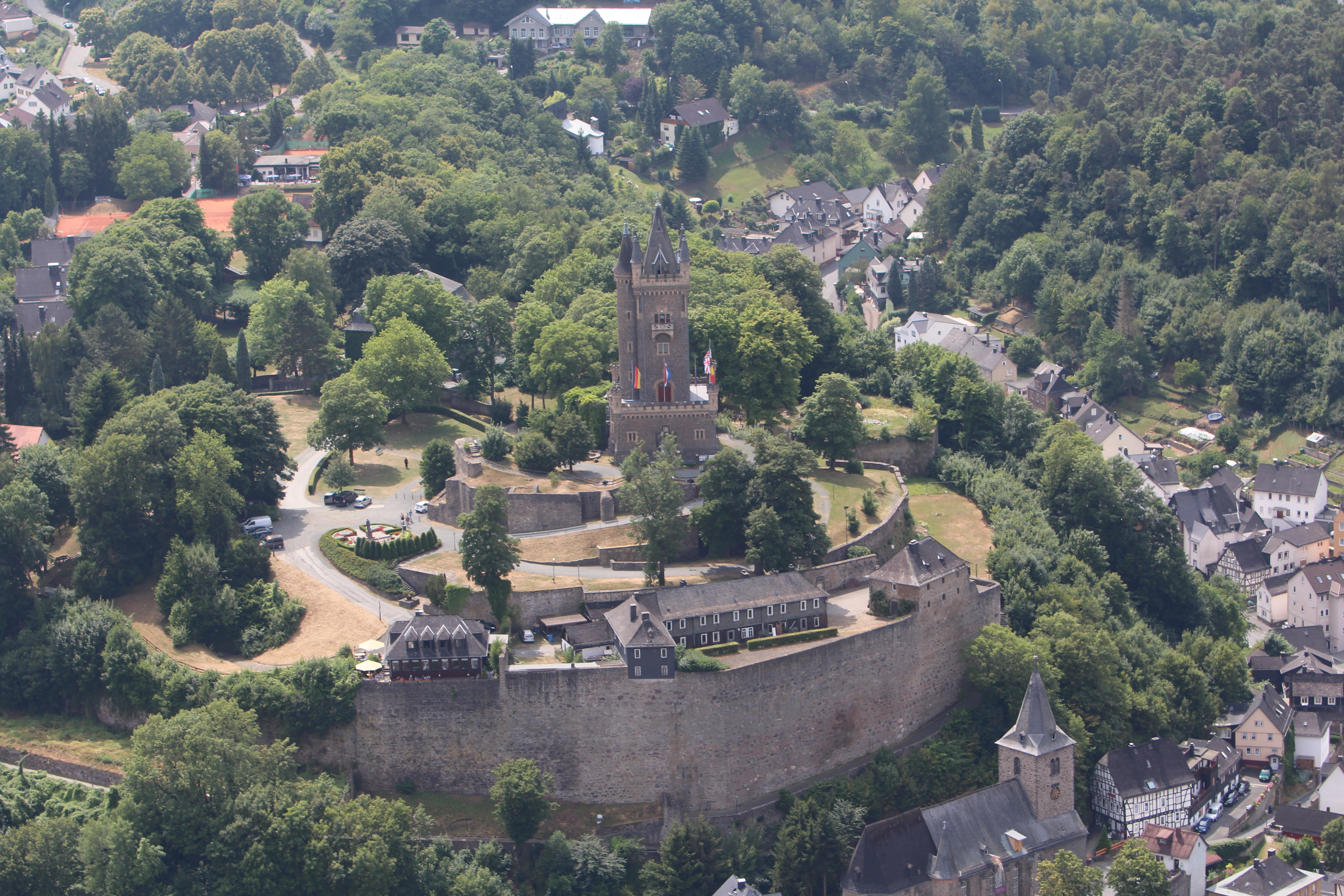
View of the hill above the Dill, with the Wilhelmsturm

Castle Dillenburg, in the provincial town of Dillenburg in Hesse-Nassau, is situated on a hill (elevation 958 feet) above the Dill river, 25 miles northwest from Gießen on the Giessen-Troisdorf railway line.

The main building of the old castle was deconstructed in 1760 after suffering fire from cannon damage in the Seven Years' War. Today the hill above the town still has the ruins of the 17th-century fortifications of the old schloss Dillenburg, but nothing at all remains of the original fortifications, which were mostly wood. It was founded by Count Henry the Rich of Nassau, about the year 1240, and later became the birthplace of Prince William of Orange in 1533. Due to the effects of the Protestant Reformation, in the town below is the (since 1530) Evangelical church but formerly Johanniskirche from 1491, with the vault of the princes of Nassau-Dillenburg.

== Wilhelmsturm ==
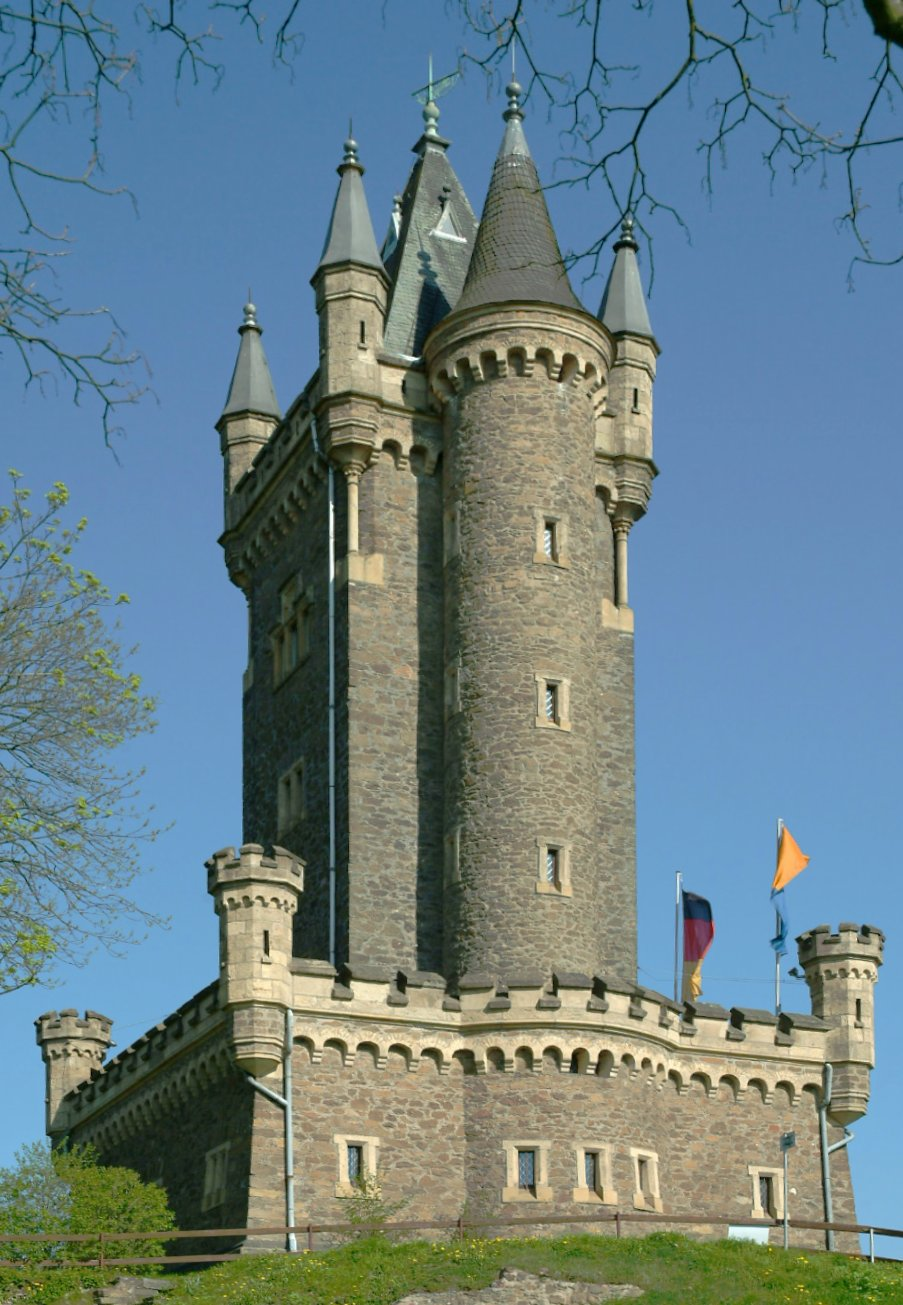
Wilhelmsturm lookout tower

In 1872 Princess Marianne, the daughter of King Willem I, helped finance the creation of a new lookout tower, Wilhelmsturm, which also houses the Oranje-Nassaumuseum. The museum commemorates William the Silent who plotted his rebellion against the Spanish Netherlands from his home on this spot.

The tower is an area landmark and is one of the points along the Orange Route and Rothaarsteig.
