= Feldkapelle, Wiesbaden =

Coordinates: 50.106046°N 8.249739°E

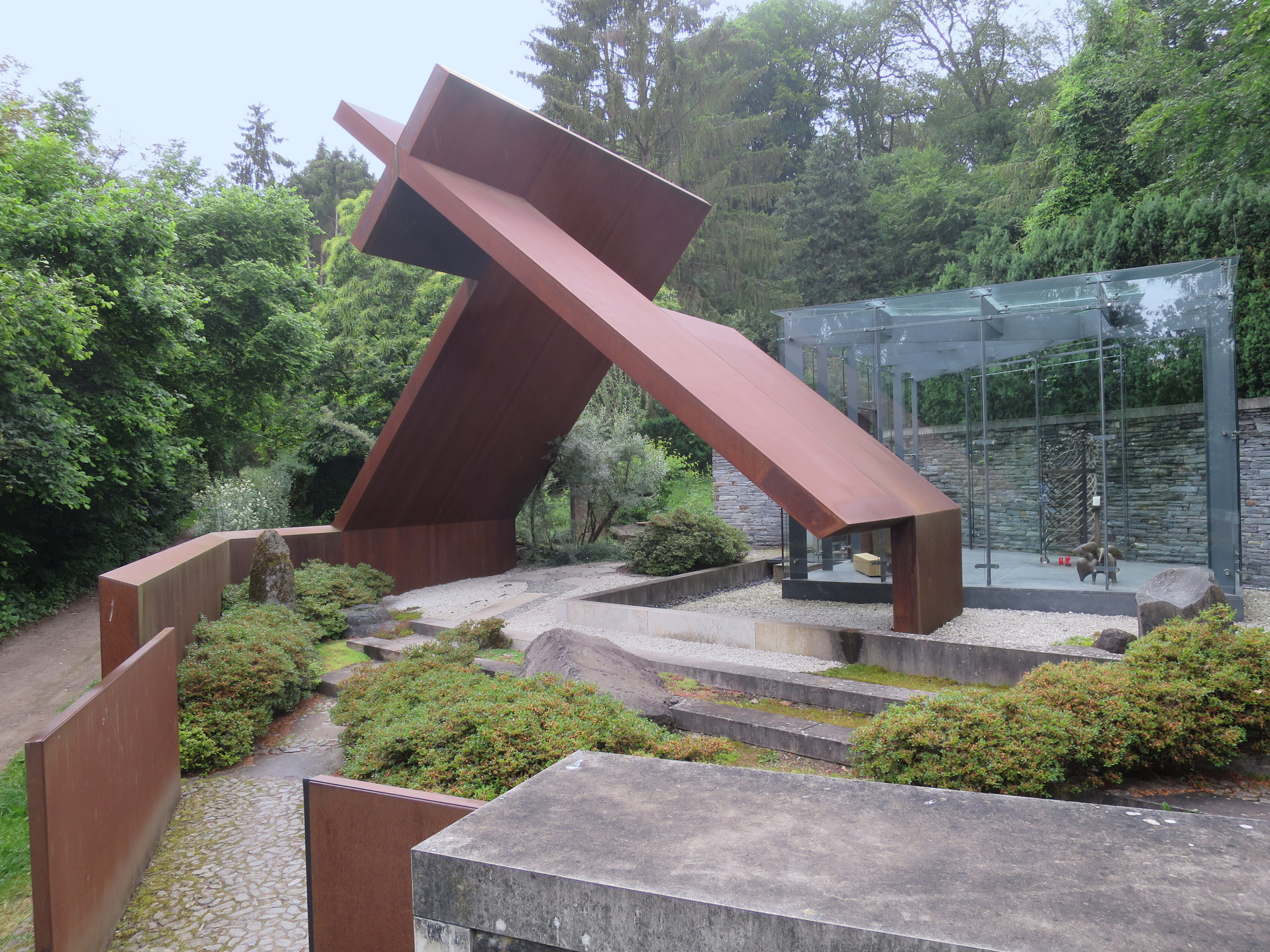
Feldkapelle in Wiesbaden-Sonnenberg

The Feldkapelle is a modern version of a traditional Feldkapelle, a chapel in the fields, in Wiesbaden-Sonnenberg, Hesse, Germany. The interdenominational chapel and a surrounding garden, enclosed by a wall, were built on an initiative of the Matthäus 7, 12 foundation. Planned from 2003, it was built from 2010 and opened in 2012.

== Location ==
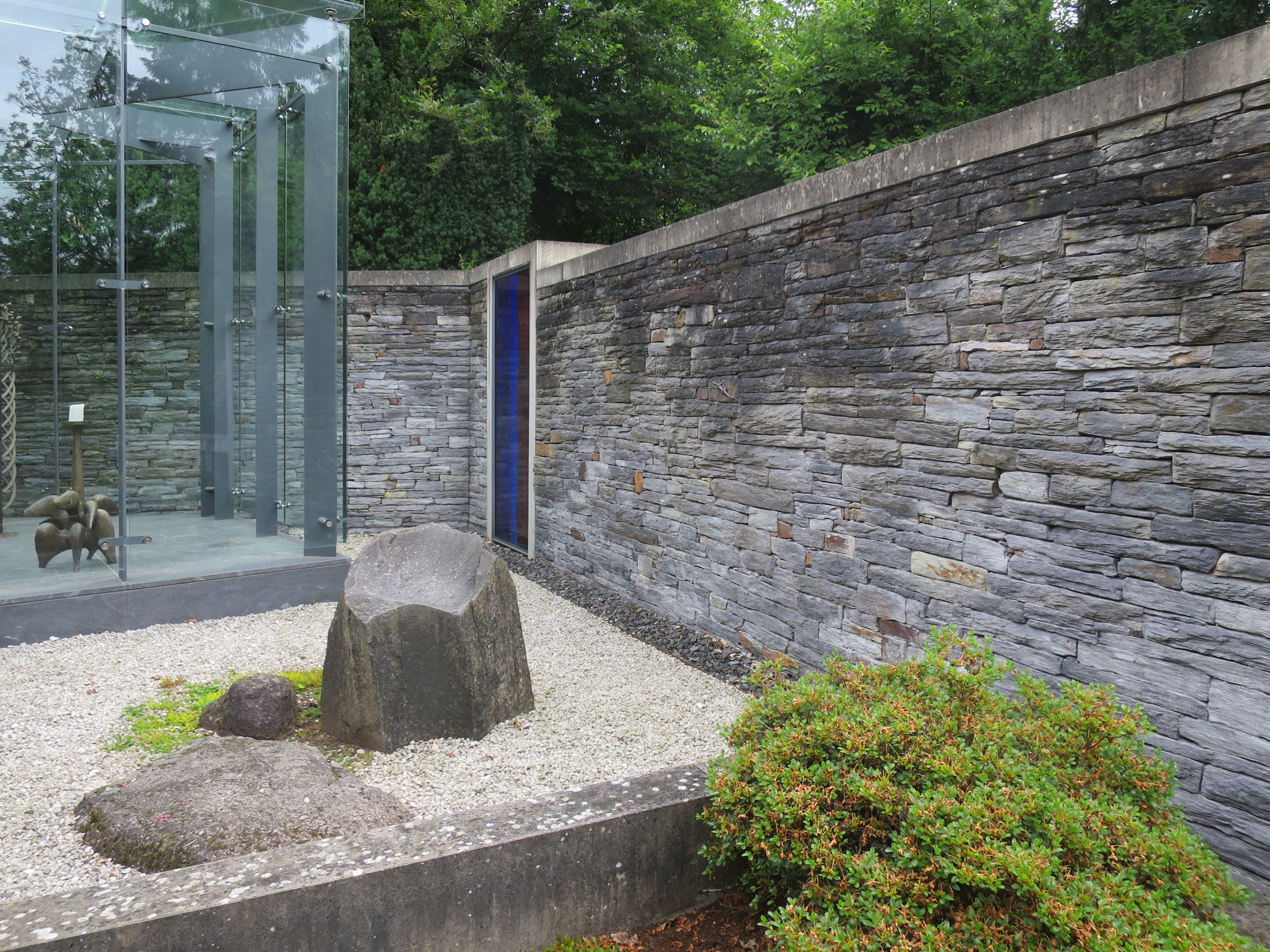
Wall

The Feldkapelle is located in the upper Tennelbach valley, of a tributary of the Rambach, at the edge of a forest and near Streuobstwiesen. It is easily reached walking from Sonnenberg. The chapel and the garden are open and accessible to visitors.

== History ==
The Feldkapelle was planned from 2003; the architect Hans-Peter Gresser designed it in close cooperation with the Matthäus 7, 12 foundation. The foundation is based on verse 12 from the Mark 7, the Goldene rule, which is followed in Christianity, Judaism and Islam. The ground-breaking took place on 27 October 2010, and the chapel was opened on 25 August 2012.
