= Wiesbaden-Sonnenberg =

Sonnenberg
- Borough of Wiesbaden
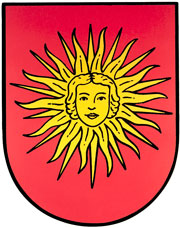
- Coat of arms

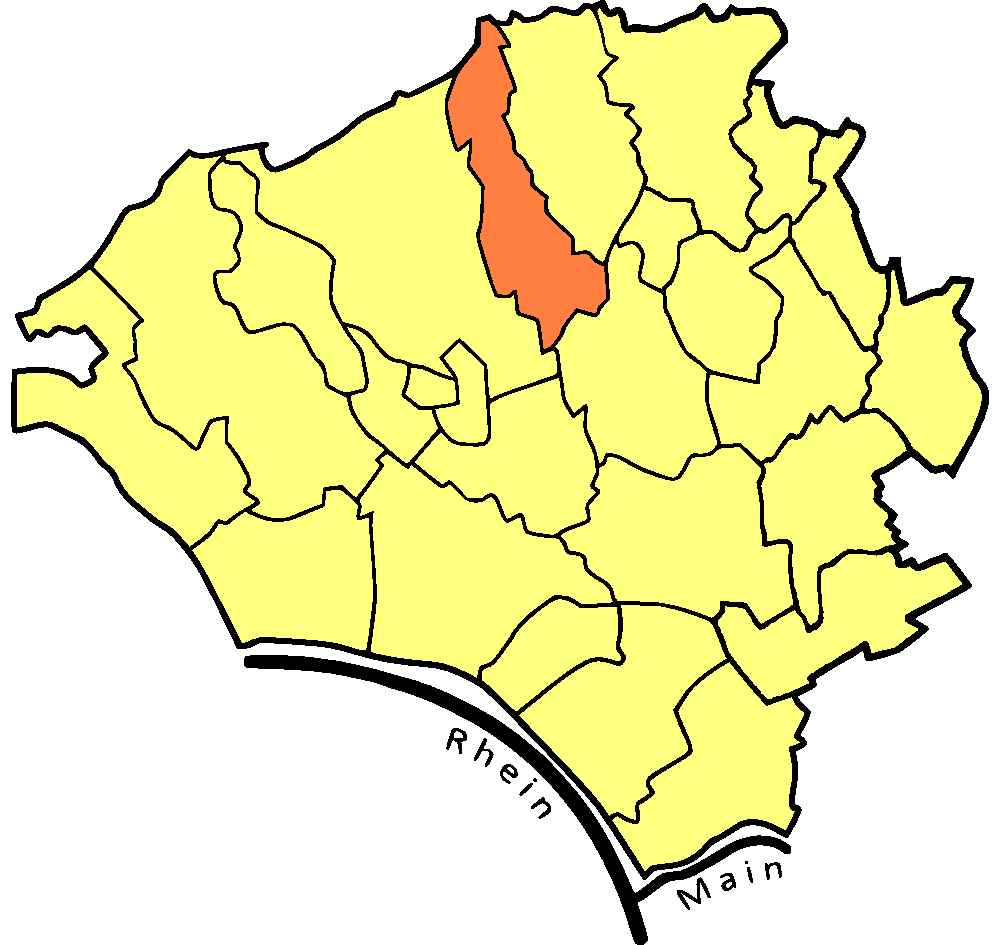
- Location of Sonnenberg in Wiesbaden
- Interactive map of Sonnenberg
- Location within Germany Location within Hesse
- Coordinates: 50°06′07″N 8°15′53″E
- Country: Germany
- State: Hesse
- District: Urban district
- City: Wiesbaden

Government
  - Mayor: Stefan Bauer (CDU)

Area
  - Total: 8.34 km^{2} (3.22 sq mi)

Population (2020-12-31)
  - Total: 7,960
  - Density: 954/km^{2} (2,470/sq mi)
- Time zone: UTC+01:00 (CET)
  - Summer (DST): UTC+02:00 (CEST)
- Postal codes: 65193, 65191
- Dialling codes: 0611

Sonnenberg (German pronunciation: [ˈzɔnənbɛʁk]) is a borough of Wiesbaden, the capital of the state of Hesse, Germany. Formerly an independent municipality, Sonnenberg was incorporated into Wiesbaden on 28 October 1926. The borough has approximately 8,000 residents.

Sonnenberg is located in the northeast of the city. Its historic center is located in the foothills of the Taunus in the narrow valley of the Rambach.

Burg Sonnenberg (Sonnenberg Castle) is situated on a mountain spur above the town. While the castle is now in ruins, the castle tower and parts of the fortifications and the city walls are preserved to a large extent.

== History of Sonnenberg Castle ==
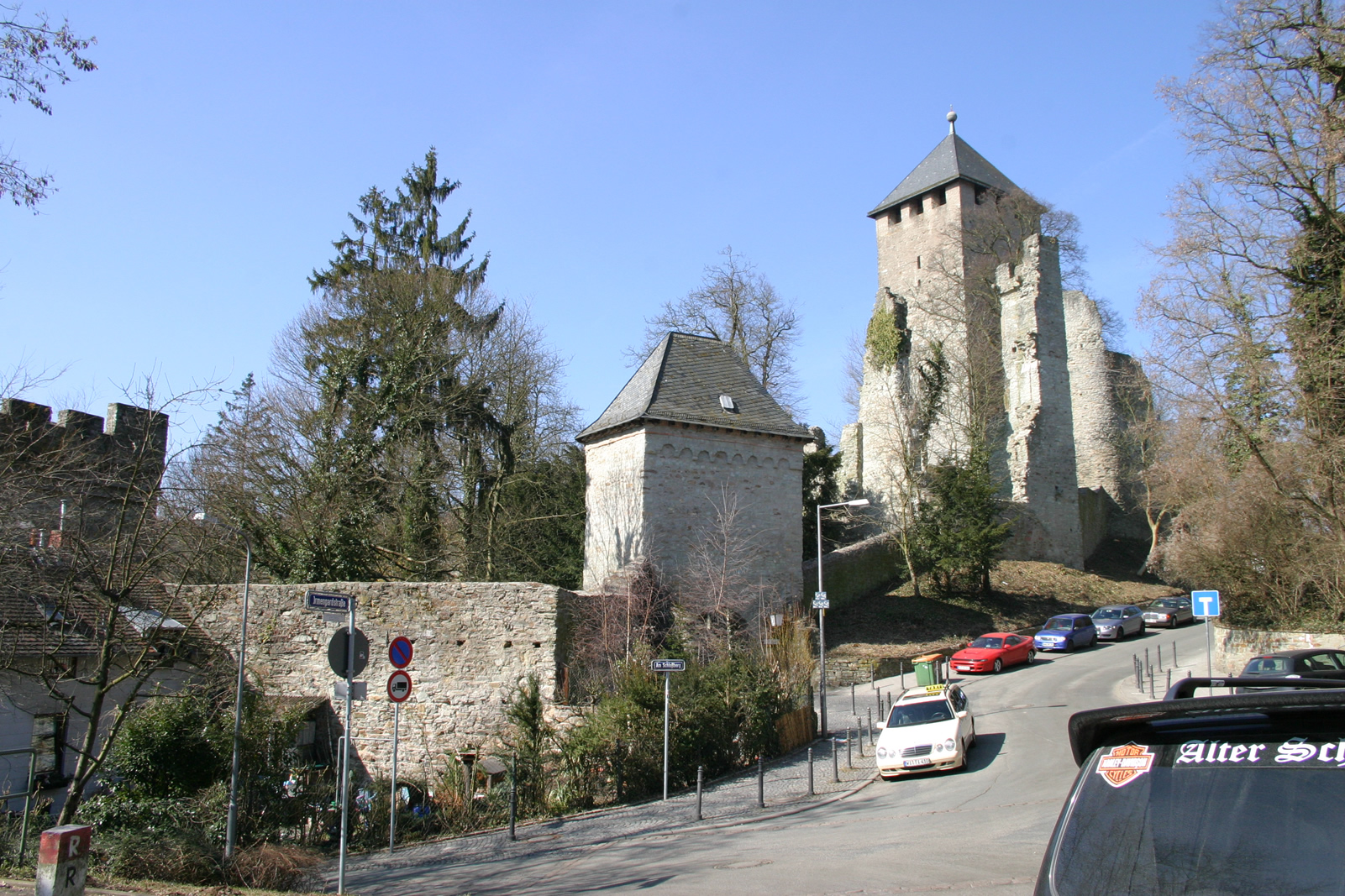
Sonnenberg Castle

Sonnenberg Castle was built around 1201-1203 by the brothers Henry II (German: Heinrich) and Robert IV (German: Ruprecht), Counts of the House of Nassau, for the protection of Wiesbaden against the neighboring Lords of Eppstein, with whom a permanent border dispute existed. Friedrich I had awarded the Royal City of Wiesbaden to the House of Nassau in 1154 as a reward for their support. Wiesbaden had been a royal city since the reign of Charlemagne, first mentioned in 829 as an administrative headquarters of a Königssondergau (Imperial special district). However, the court system for the region came under the dominion of Eppstein. This complicated arrangement, where both houses claimed jurisdiction, gave rise to constant strife between them.

The first written mention of Sonnenberg dates from 1208 or 1209 in the name of the first Burgmann ("castellan") Ulbert of Idstein-Sonnenberg as Sonnenburch and Sunnenberc. It was first called Sonnenberc in 1221. Ownership of the land was initially disputed by the Saint Martin's Domstift (cathedral endowment) of Mainz. This dependence to Mainz had been generally unfavorable to Sonnenberg a long time, because four Archbishops of Mainz in the 13th century alone were from Eppstein, the enemies of Nassau. The dispute over Sonnenberg was settled by a treaty in 1221, in which Nassau obtained the land on which the castle is built as a fief for 30 Marks. Sonnenberg Castle was one of nine castles ruled by the House of Nassau.

In 1240, Henry II became the sole ruler of the Nassau possessions. After his death, the inheritance was divided among Henry's sons, Walram and Otto. Sonnenberg became the possession of Walram's Countship of Nassau-Weilburg.

In 1283, Walram's son Count Adolf of Nassau rebuilt the castle (it had been heavily damaged in conflict with Eppstein). The castle was Adolf's seat when he was crowned King of the Romans on 5 May 1292. After Adolf's death in 1298, Eppstein, with the help of Archbishop of Mainz, Gerhard II, again occupied and destroyed the castle. Adolf's son, Gerlach I, still a child, was saved.

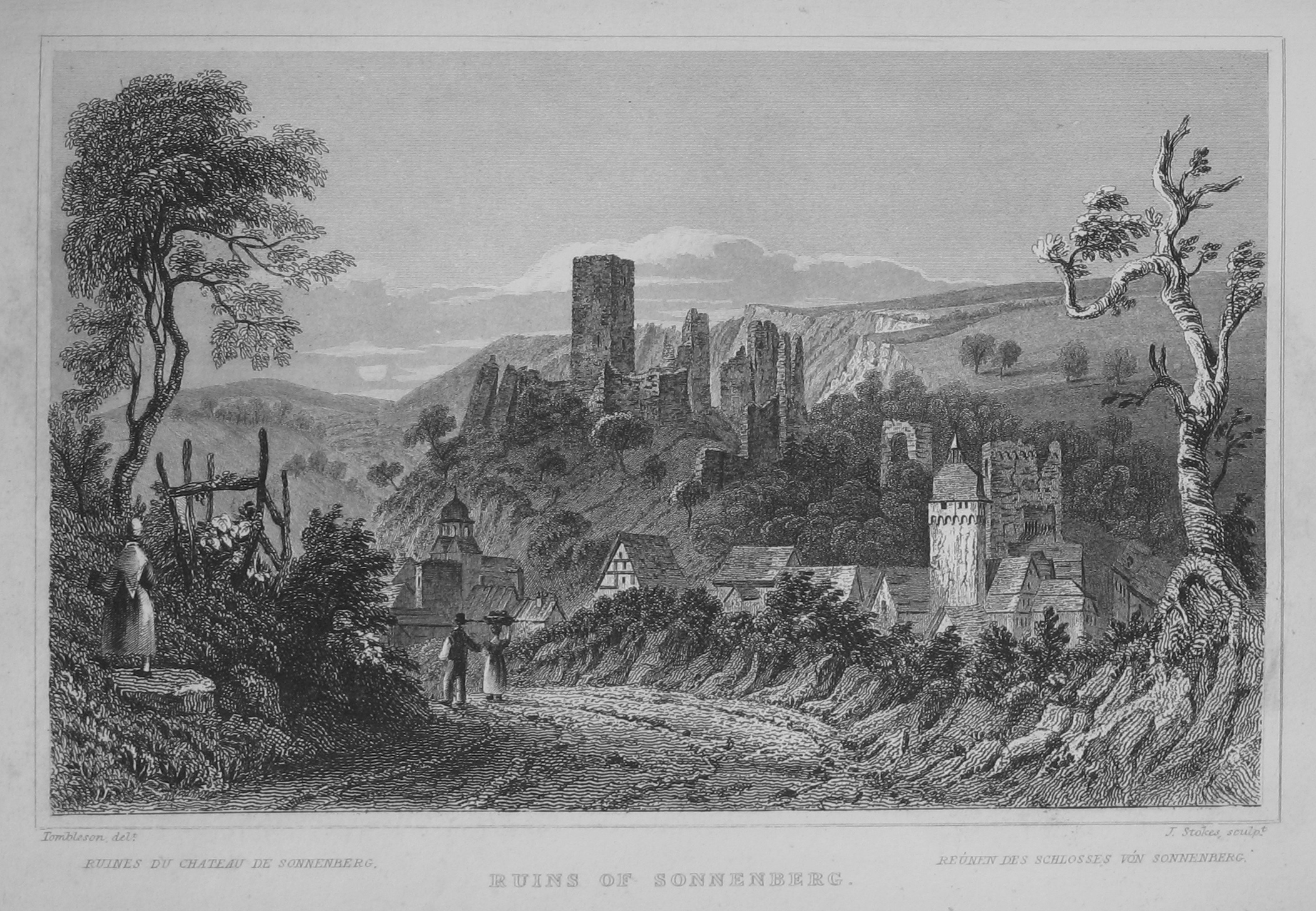
Ruins of Sonnenberg, steel engraving from "Views of the Rhine" by William Tombleson (c. 1840)

Later, under Gerlach's rule, peace was reached between Nassau and Eppstein and the Castle of Sonnenberg was expanded. In 1338, Emperor Ludwig the Bavarian visited the castle, a testimony to its size and security in those years. On 29 July 1351 the King of Bohemia, and later Holy Roman Emperor, Charles IV awarded the town of Sonnenberg rights to its own jurisdiction. As a result, houses at the foot of the castle could now be surrounded by a wall in an overall integrated complex, providing the residents some security.

When Count Gerlach died in 1361, his son Ruprecht (from his second marriage), since 1355 Count of the newly established dominion of Nassau-Sonnenberg, inherited the castle. When Ruprecht died childless in 1390, his wife Anna continued to live there. After her death in 1405, the castle returned to the joint rule of the Counts of Nassau-Idstein and Nassau-Weilburg and deteriorated over the next 200 years. However, under Count Philipp von Nassau-Idstein (1558 to 1566), the castle again became a residence. He, too, died childless and the end of the 16th century the castle was uninhabited.

Sonnenberg experienced major damage in 1625 during the Thirty Years' War, so that only a dozen houses were habitable. The castle served as a quarry for the reconstruction of the houses in the valley. In 1672, the city was again devastated by troops of the Margraviate of Brandenburg.

== Thalkirche ==
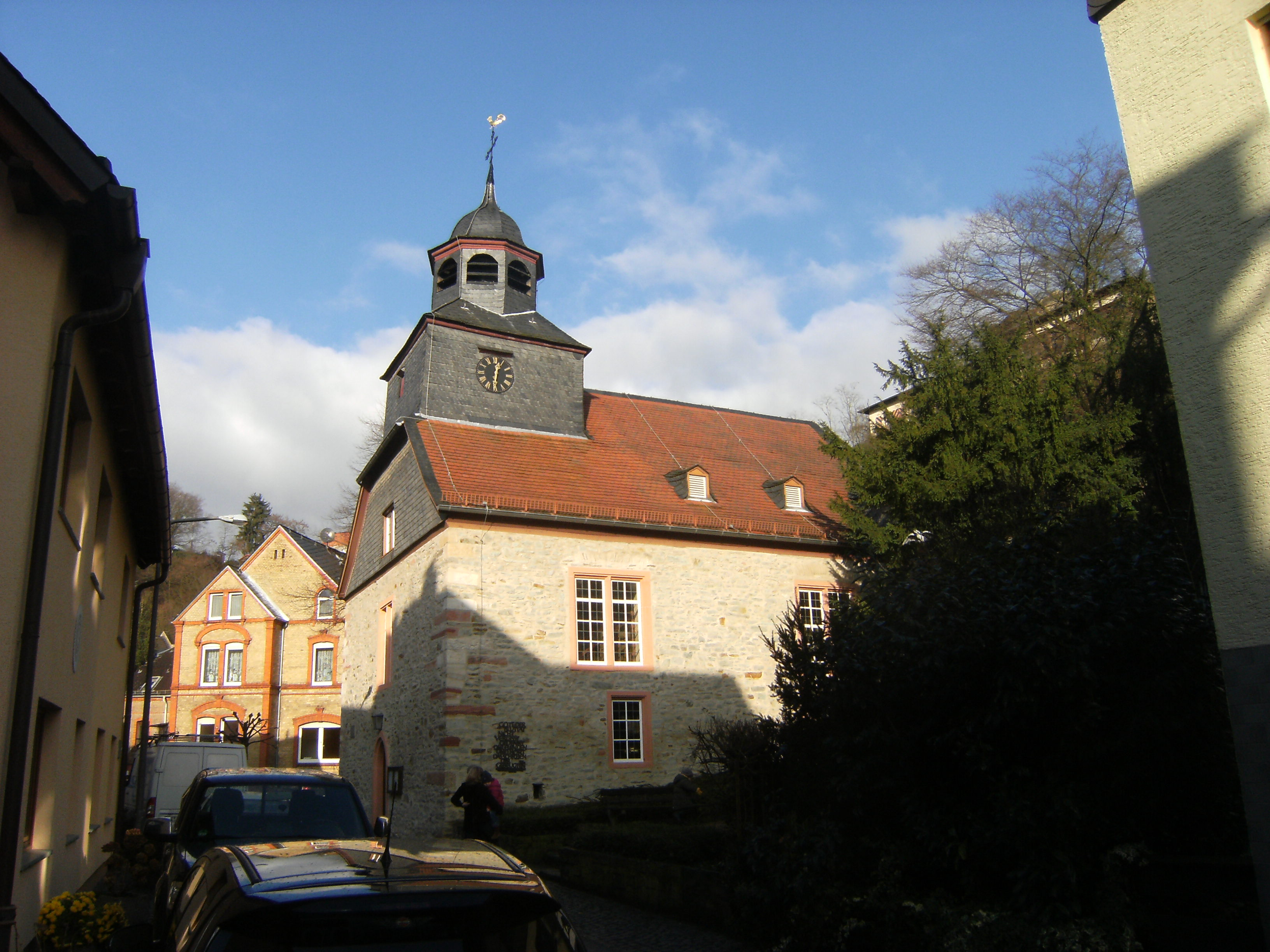
Sonnenberg Thalkirche

The Thalkirche (Valley Church) of Sonnenberg dates to 1429, when Werner Hut, Lord of the Castle, endowed the chapel of Saint Mary in the Valley. In 1529, Johann von Nassau-Sporkenburg, heir to the Hut family, opened the former private chapel to the residents of Sonnenberg. The church was expanded in 1535 and became Protestant in 1540.

Due to damage incurred during the Thirty Years' War in 1625, the church was unusable. Services were held in the Holy Cross Chapel in the Sonnenberg Cemetery for decades afterward. The church was looted by the soldiers of Brandenburg in 1672.

A gallery was added in 1733. In 1883, there was a thorough renovation of the church. The pulpit was moved to a position in the center above the altar, where it stands today.

== Gallery ==
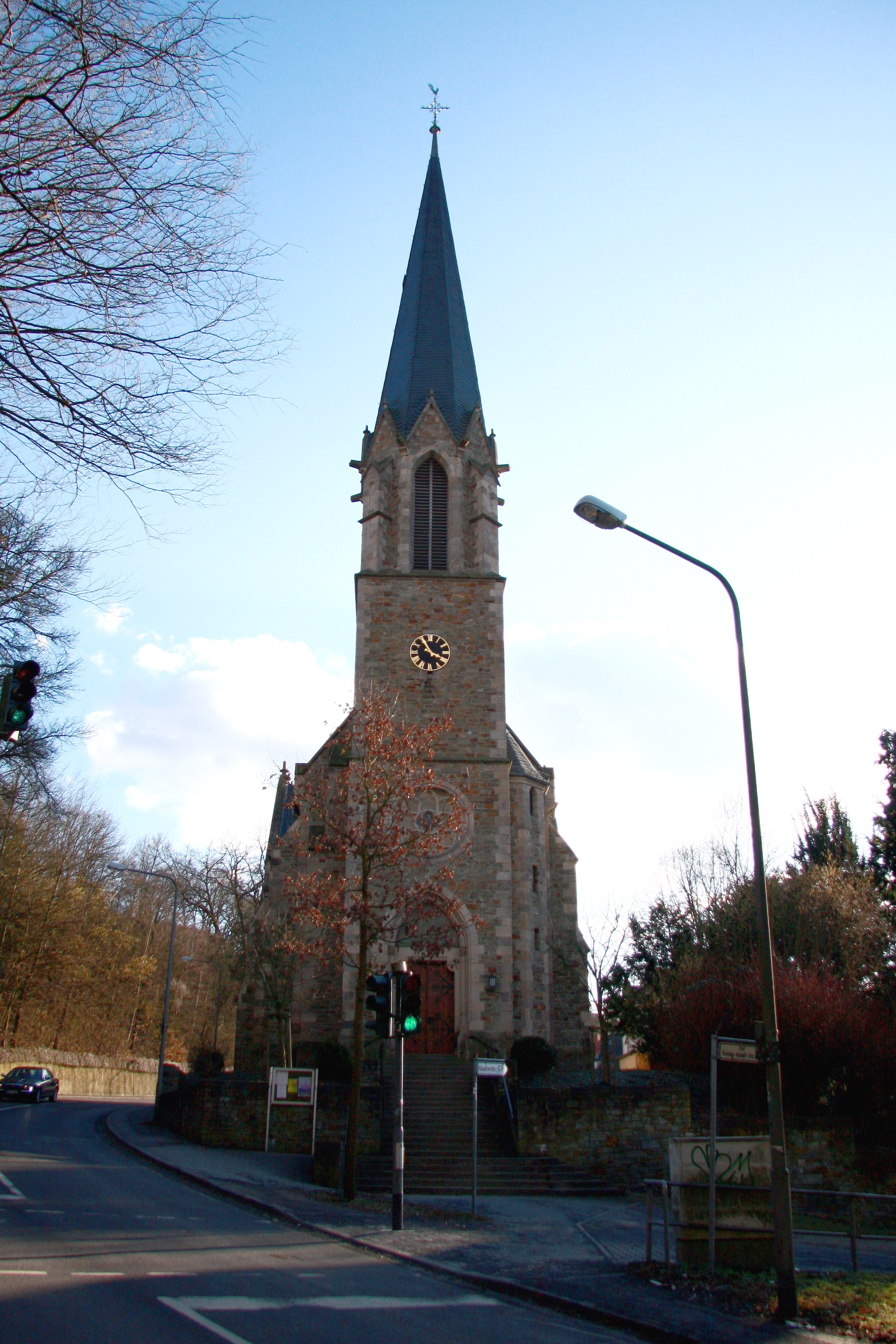
Herz Jesu church, front

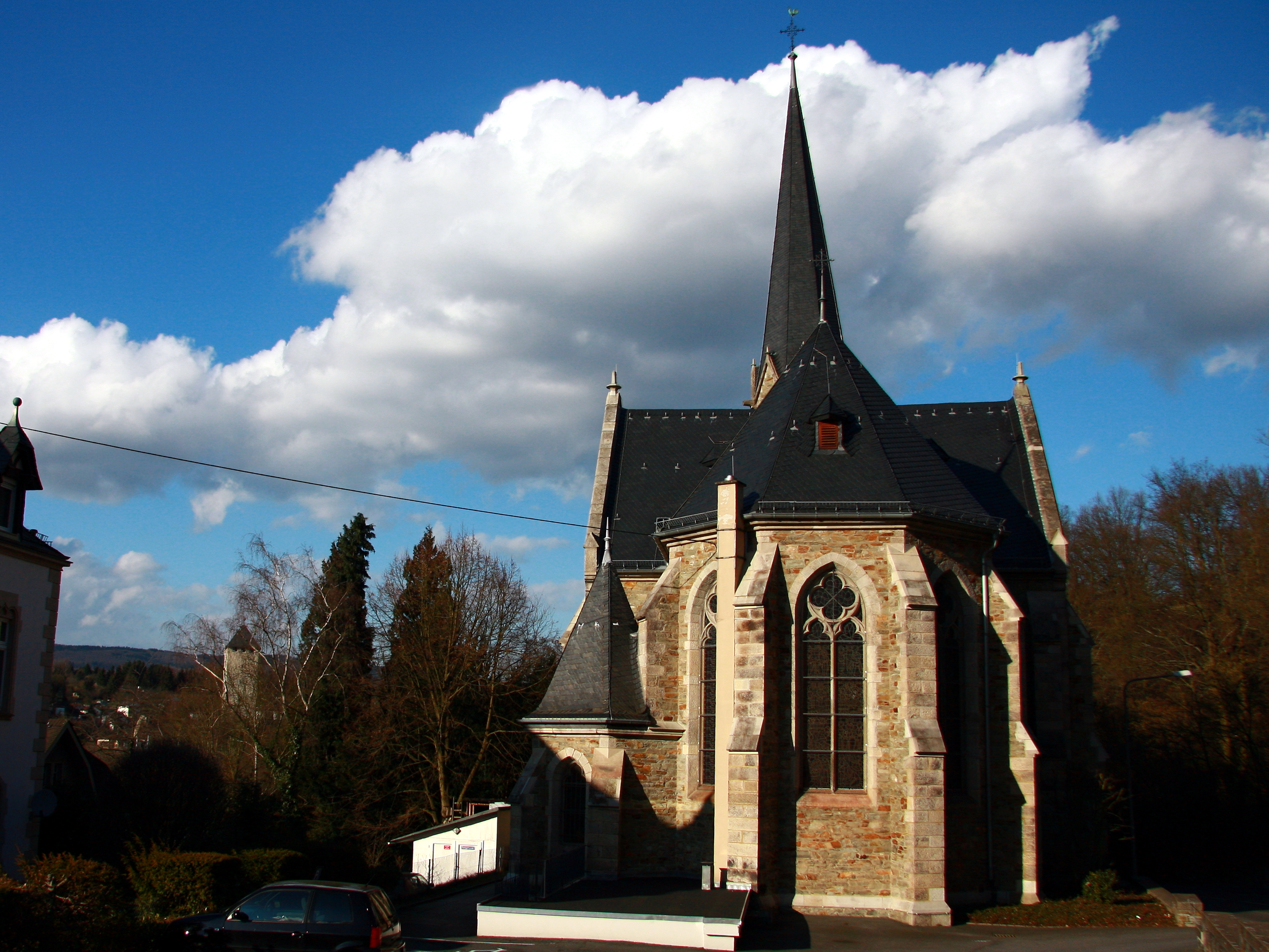
Herz Jesu church, rear

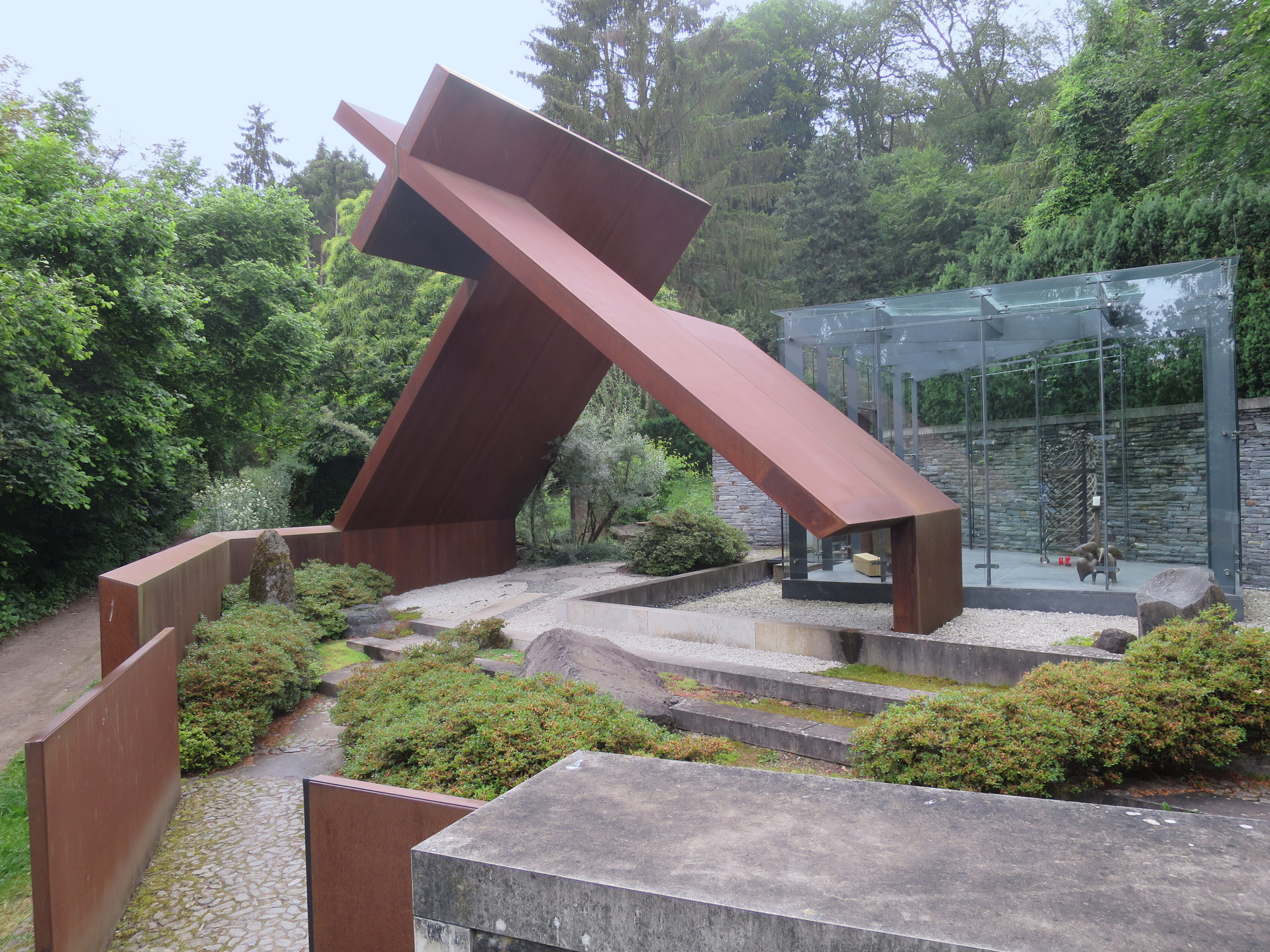
Feldkapelle

== Sources ==
- Derived from German Wikipedia
