= Herman, Count of Nassau =

- Born: Unknown
- Died: 16 July before 1206
- Noble family: House of Nassau
- Spouse: —
- Father: Rupert III of Nassau
- Mother: Elizabeth of Leiningen

Herman of Nassau, German: Hermann von Nassau (died 16 July before 1206), was count of Nassau. He later became a clergyman.

== Life ==
Coat-of-arms of the counts of Nassau

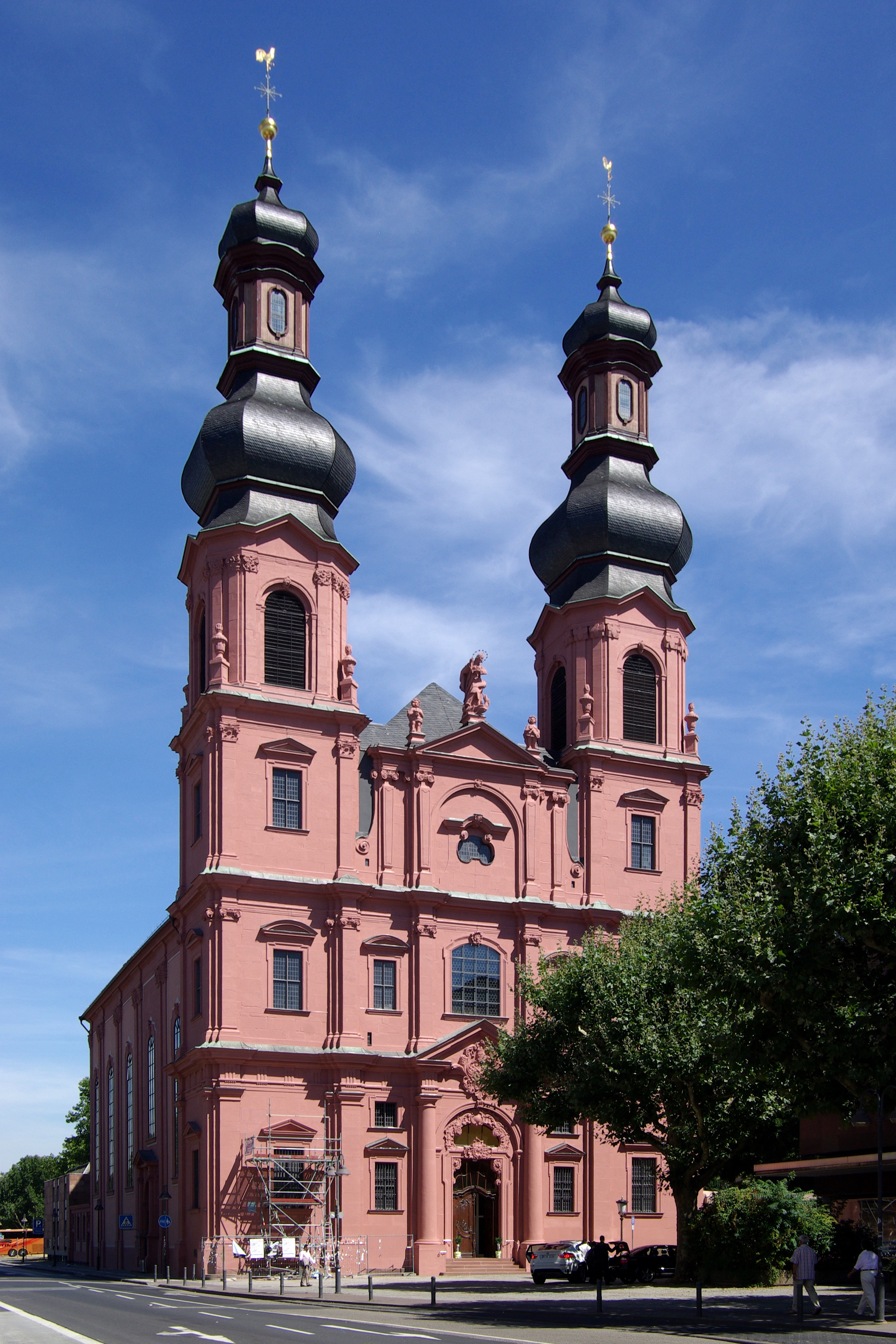
St. Peter's Church, Mainz

Herman was the son of count Rupert III ‘the Bellicose’ of Nassau and Elizabeth of Leiningen.

Herman is mentioned as count of Nassau between 1190 and 1192. He ruled together with count Walram I of Nassau, his father's cousin.

In 1192 Herman became canon of the Saint Peter at Mainz. He probably wasn't married and died without offspring.

== Sources ==
- This article is translated from the corresponding Dutch Wikipedia article, as of 2018-08-27.
- Dek, A.W.E. (1970). Genealogie van het Vorstenhuis Nassau [Genealogy of the Royal House of Nassau] (in Dutch). Zaltbommel: Europese Bibliotheek. OCLC 27365371.
- Hesselfelt, H.F.J. (1965). "De oudste generaties van het Huis Nassau" [The oldest generations of the House of Nassau]. De Nederlandsche Leeuw, Maandblad van het Koninklijk Nederlandsch Genootschap voor Geslacht- en Wapenkunde [The Dutch Lion, Monthly Journal of the Royal Dutch Society for Genealogy and Heraldry] (in Dutch). 1965 (11): 354–365.
- Schwennicke, Detlev (1978). Europäische Stammtafeln. Stammtafeln zur Geschichte europäischen Staaten. Neue Folge [European Genealogies. Genealogies from the History of European States. New Series] (in German). Vol. Band I. Marburg: J.A. Stargardt.
- Venne, J.M. van de; Stols, Alexander A.M. (1937). Geslachts-Register van het Vorstenhuis Nassau [Genealogy of the Royal House of Nassau] (in Dutch). Maastricht: A.A.M. Stols’ Uitgevers-Maatschappij.
- Vorsterman van Oyen, A.A. (1882). Het vorstenhuis Oranje-Nassau. Van de vroegste tijden tot heden [The Royal House of Orange-Nassau. From the earliest days until the present] (in Dutch). Leiden & Utrecht: A.W. Sijthoff & J.L. Beijers.

German nobility
Preceded by Rupert III	co-Count of Nassau (with Walram I); 1190–1192	Succeeded by Walram I
