= Herz Jesu, Sonnenberg =

Coordinates: 50°05′59″N 8°16′02″E

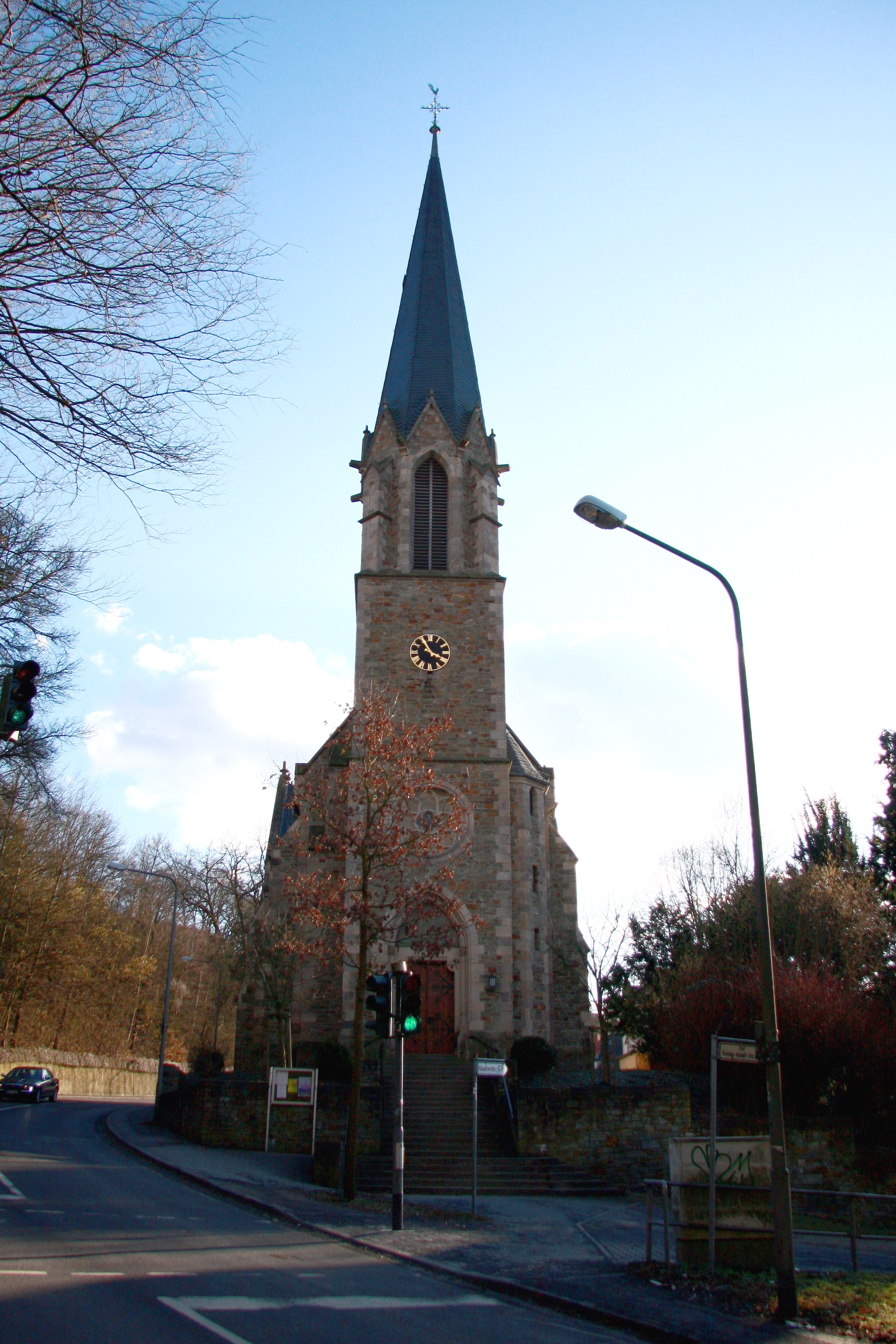
Portal and tower of Herz Jesu

Herz Jesu is a Catholic church in Sonnenberg, now a suburb of Wiesbaden, the capital of Hesse, Germany.

The church in Gothic revival style was consecrated in 1890, dedicated to the Sacred Heart of Jesus. The nave and the altar area are decorated with paintings. Coloured stained-glass windows behind the altar depict scenes from the Old and New Testaments. The tabernacle and the ambo were created in 1982 by an artist from Maria Laach Abbey. A crucifix next to the altar was made in the 17th century. A chapel to the right of the main altar has an altar with a sculpture of Mary. The entrance area features an icon and a pietà.

In 2006 the building was completely restored; an original main altar was removed at the time. The financing of the restoration came from donations of parish members and local businesses. Originally an independent parish, it has belonged to the parish of St. Birgid in Wiesbaden-Bierstadt from 2014.
