= Gerhard of Nassau =

- Born: Unknown
- Died: between 7 April 1312 and 20 September 1314
- Noble family: House of Nassau
- Spouse: -
- Father: Henry II of Nassau
- Mother: Matilda of Guelders and Zutphen

Gerhard of Nassau (German: Gerhard von Nassau; died between 7 April 1312 and 20 September 1314) was a clergyman from the House of Nassau. He was probably the first Nassau in the Netherlands.

Gerhard was the fifth son of Count Henry II of Nassau and Matilda of Guelders and Zutphen, the youngest daughter of Count Otto I of Guelders and Zutphen and Richardis of Bavaria. Gerhard is first mentioned in a charter from 1247.

Gerhard followed a career in the church and held the following offices:

- Provost of the chapter of Aachen collegiate church, mentioned on 21 November 1259, 27 June 1298 and 7 April 1312.
- Archdeacon at Liège 1259-1290 and 1301-1310.
- Archdeacon of the Ardennes, mentioned in 1262 and 1270.
- Provost of the chapter of Our Lady in Maastricht, mentioned in 1266, 1273 and 1275.
- Archdeacon of Kempenland after 1274.
- Provost of the chapter of St. Plechelm's in Oldenzaal 1276-1277.
- Provost of the chapter of St. Peter's in Liège in 1278.
- Canon of St. Lambert's in Liège.
- Provost of the chapter of St. Walburg's in Tiel from 1284 to 28 April 1303.
- Canon of St. Martin's in Mainz in 1301.

Gerhard died between 7 April 1312 and 20 September 1314. The anniversarium was celebrated in Aachen on 2 May and in Liège on 6 June. Gerhard was buried in front of the altar of Saint Nicholas in Aachen Cathedral.

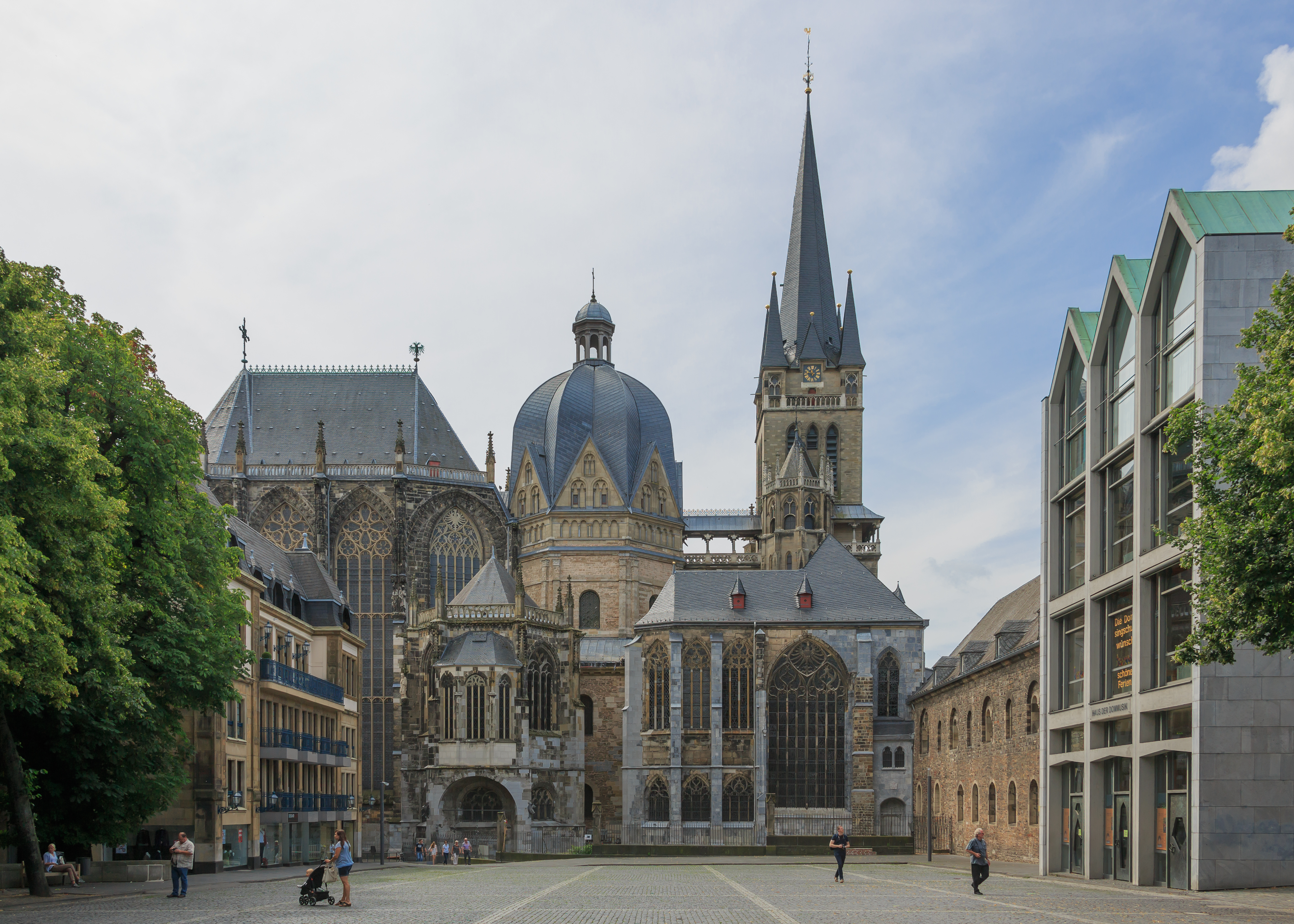
Aachen Cathedral

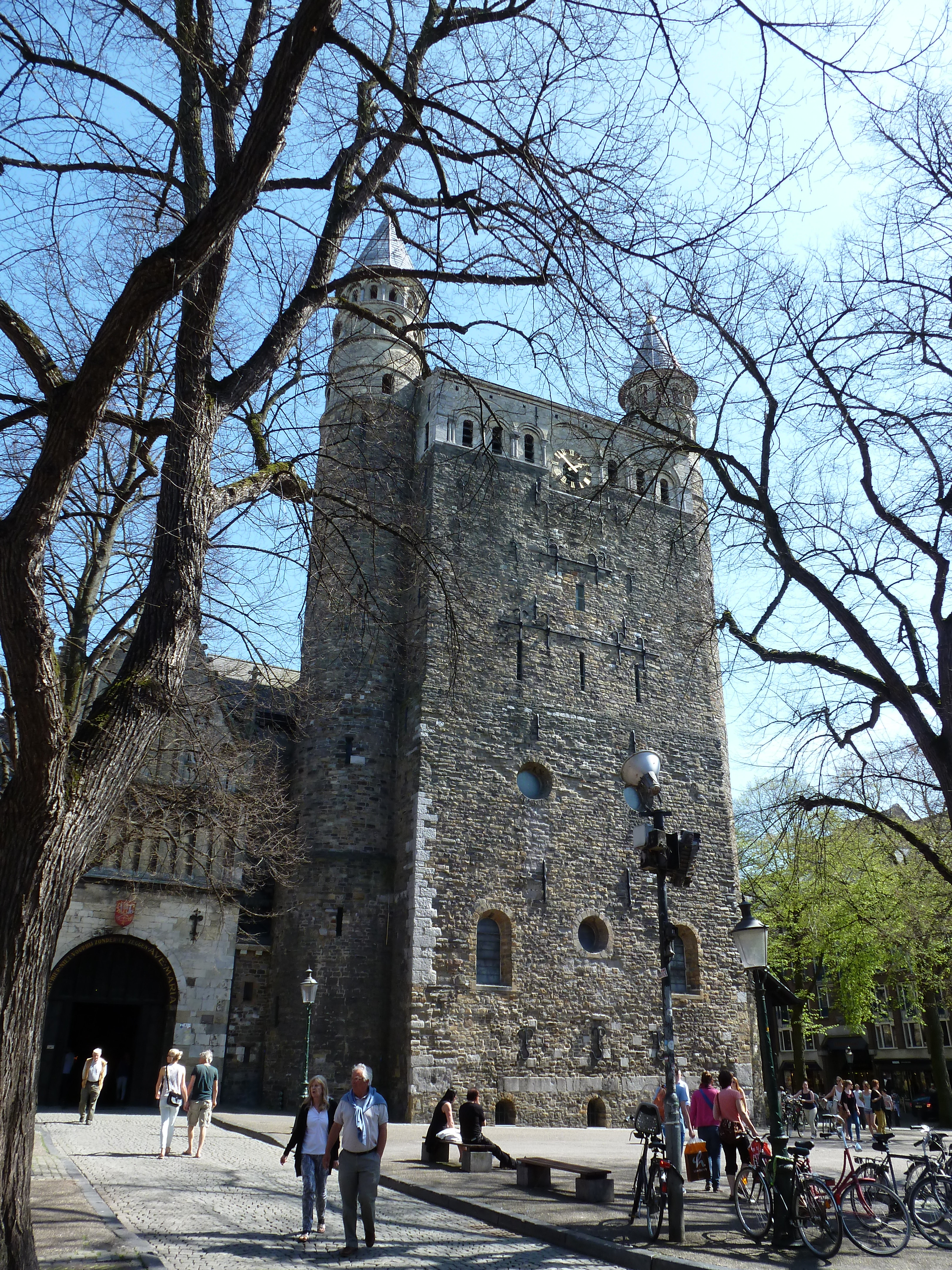
Basilica of Our Lady, Maastricht

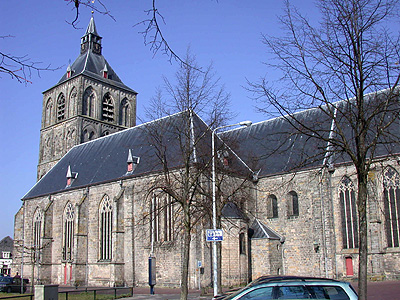
Basilica of St. Plechelm, Oldenzaal

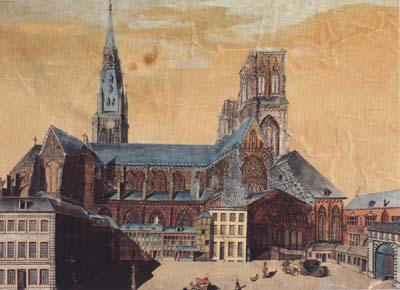
St. Lambert's Cathedral, Liège

== Sources ==
- This article was translated from the corresponding Dutch Wikipedia article, as of 2019-09-04.
- Dek, A.W.E. (1970). Genealogie van het Vorstenhuis Nassau [Genealogy of the Royal House of Nassau] (in Dutch). Zaltbommel: Europese Bibliotheek. OCLC 27365371.
- Venne, J.M. van der; Stols, Alexander A.M. (1937). "Gerhard graaf van Nassau, 1259-1313. De oudst bekende Nassau in Nederland?" [Gerhard Count of Nassau, 1259-1313. The eldest known Nassau in the Netherlands?]. De Nederlandsche Leeuw, Maandblad van Het Koninklijk Nederlandsch Genootschap voor Geslacht- en Wapenkunde [The Dutch Lion, Monthly Journal of the Royal Dutch Society for Genealogy and Heraldry] (in Dutch). 1937 (2).
