= Henry II of Nassau =

Count of Nassau (c. 1180 – before 1251)

Henry II, Count of Nassau

Count of Nassau
- Reign: 1 February 1198 – 26 April 1250
- Predecessor: Walram I
- Successor: Walram II; Otto I
- Born: c. 1180
- Died: 26 April 1247/48/49/50
- Noble family: House of Nassau
- Spouse: Matilda of Guelders and Zutphen
- Issue Detail: Walram II, Count of Nassau; Otto I, Count of Nassau; Henry; Elizabeth; Gerhard of Nassau; John I, Bishop-Elect of Utrecht
- Father: Walram I of Nassau
- Mother: Kunigunde

Henry II "the Rich" of Nassau (German: Heinrich II. "der Reiche" von Nassau; c. 1180 – 26 April 1247/48/49/50, before 25 January 1251) was Count of Nassau. He distinguished himself in particular by his chivalrous and devout spirit. He was charitable and made great donations to the church, so that the monasteries and prayer houses in the area of present-day Nassau experienced the most significant bloom in his time. The greatest favour was the Teutonic Order to enjoy, to which he donated especially for the renunciation of his brother's, upon his entry into the order. Henry participated in the Sixth Crusade. He was the builder of the castles Sonnenberg, Ginsburg and Dillenburg.

== Life ==
Coat of Arms of the Counts of Nassau

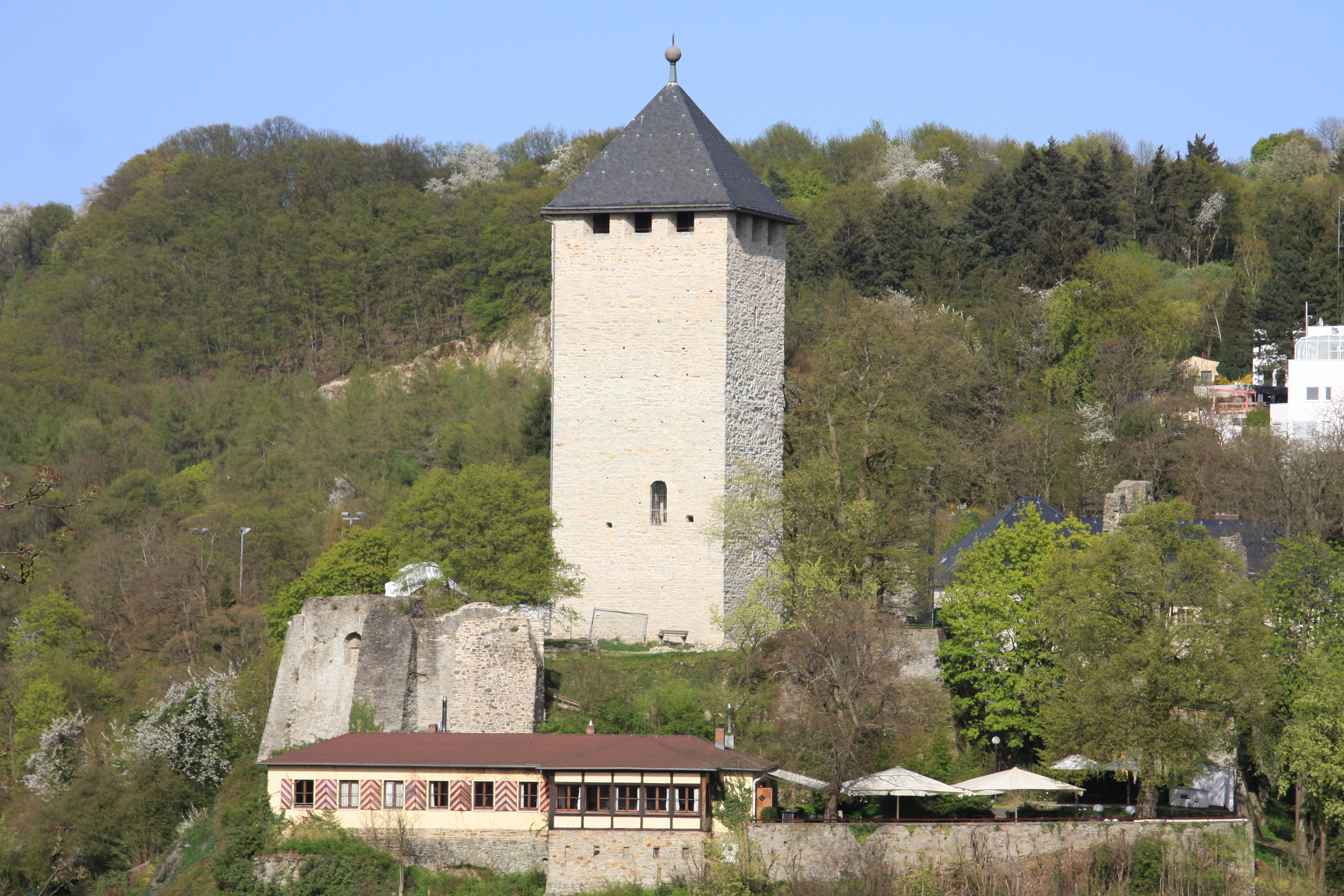
Sonnenberg Castle

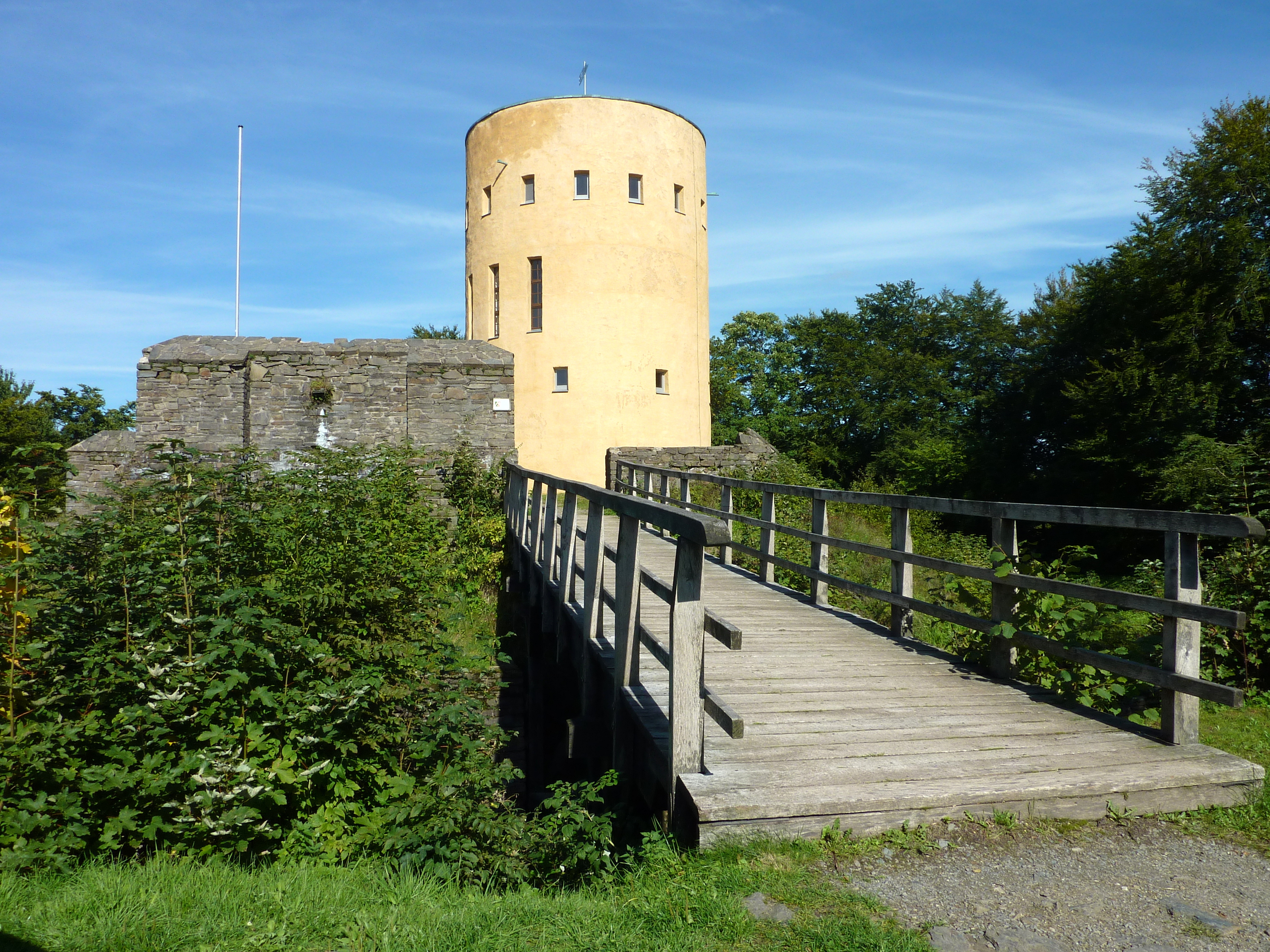
Ginsburg Castle

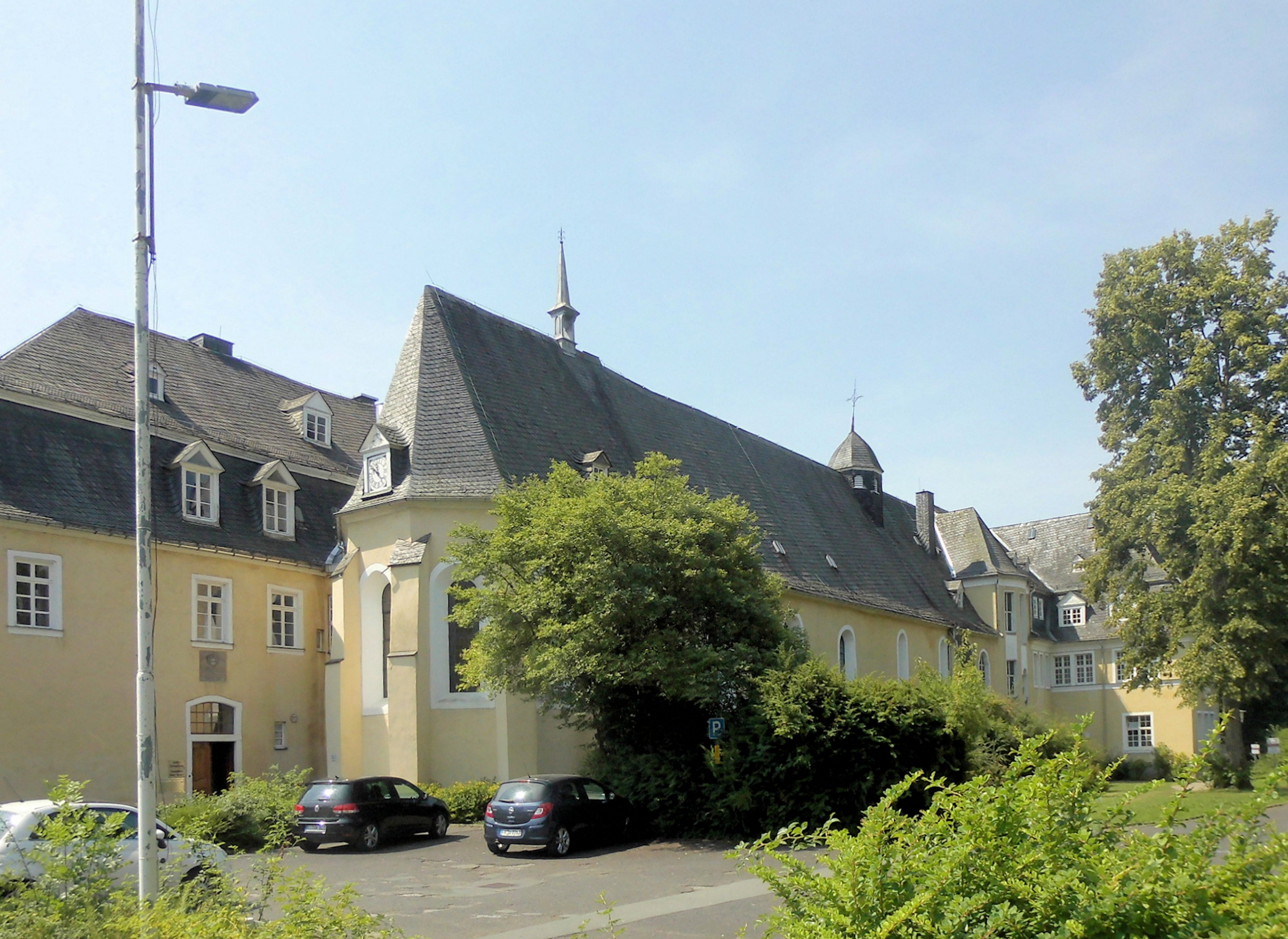
Keppel Abbey

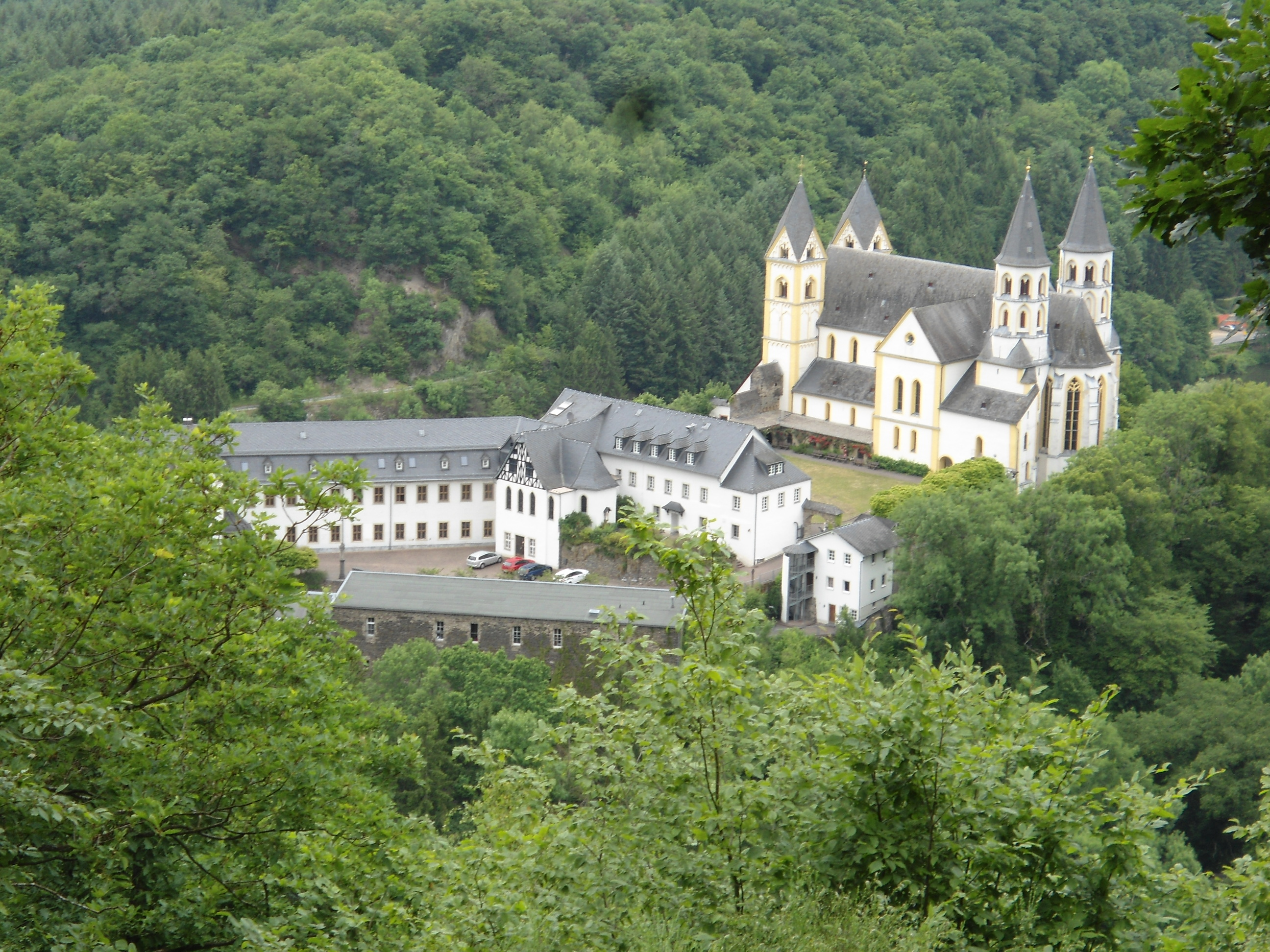
Arnstein Abbey

Henry II was the eldest son of Count Walram I of Nassau and a certain Kunigunde, possibly a daughter of a count of Sponheim or a daughter of count Poppo II of Ziegenhain.

Henry is mentioned for the first time in a charter dated 20 March 1198, together with his mother and his brother Rupert IV. This mention means that he and his brother were of age at that time, that is to say, they had reached the age of 12.

Henry is mentioned as count of Nassau between 1198 and 1247. He reigned with his brother Rupert until 1230.

=== National politics ===
In the politics of the Holy Roman Empire, Henry was generally a loyal supporter of the Hohenstaufen emperors. However, between 1209 and 1211, he backed the rival Otto IV of Brunswick as emperor, before reverting sides to support Frederick II. Between 1212 and 1214, he held prisoner Frederick's (and his own) opponent, Archbishop Theodoric II of Trier. Henry was in 1214 with Emperor Frederick II in Jülich, in 1223 with Frederick's son Henry in Worms, and in 1224 in Frankfurt. In 1228 Henry took part in the Sixth Crusade of Emperor Frederick II. In 1231 Henry attended the Imperial Diet of Worms and in 1232 he was at the imperial assembly of Frederick II in Ravenna.

Later, however, Henry transferred to the papal camp, so that Frederick's son Conrad IV issued an execution order against him in 1241, about the success of which nothing is known. In 1247 Henry supported the election of Anti-King William II of Holland, who confirmed all Henry's imperial possessions and gave him the right to mint coins.

=== Local politics ===
Henry's father had received the Königshof Wiesbaden from Emperor Frederick I in reward for his support of the emperor in the conflicts of 1170–1180. The Nassau possessions in this area were expanded around 1214 when Henry received the Imperial Vogtship (Reichsvogtei) over Wiesbaden and the surrounding Königssondergau, which he held as fiefdoms.

About the year 1200, Henry, together with his brother Rupert, began building Sonnenberg on a spur of Spitzkippel peak in the Taunus above Wiesbaden. This was intended for protection against the Archbishop of Mainz and its vassals, the Lords of Eppstein, who held the lands bordering Wiesbaden. However, the cathedral chapter of St. Martin's Cathedral in Mainz claimed Sonnenberg as their own. To settle the dispute, Nassau paid 30 Marks to the cathedral chapter in 1221 to acquire the land of Sonnenberg Castle. They were also forced to recognize the sovereignty of the Archbishops of Mainz over Sonnenberg, taking the castle as a fief of Mainz.

Towards the end of the 12th century, Walram I had been able to strengthen his power on the lower Lahn. As part of the inheritance of the Counts of Arnstein, he succeeded them as the Archbishopric of Trier's Vogt in Koblenz, Pfaffendorf (now a borough of Koblenz), Niederlahnstein, and Humbach (Montabaur). However, by the 1230s, Trier's influence near the Rhine and Lahn had strengthened enough to oust Nassau from the majority of the Archbishopric's vogtships. The Archbishop had reinforced Montabaur around 1217 in order to protect his possessions on the right bank of the Rhine from Nassau.

In 1224, Henry found support from Engelbert II, the Archbishop of Cologne, who made Henry his Hofmarschall and Schenk (an honorary title that originally meant "cup-bearer"). However, in exchange for his protection from the Archbishops of Mainz and Trier, Henry had to cede half of Siegen to Cologne. Unaffected by this division of rule, however, Nassau retained its sovereign rights in Siegerland (the region surrounding Siegen), where the important High Jurisdiction (hohe Gerichtsbarkeit) and Hunting Ban (Wildbann) explicitly survived to 1259.

During his reign, Henry fought out numerous feuds, especially with the nobles von Willnsdorf over Siegen, and von Merenberg over the Landgericht Rucheslo in the old Erdehegaue. In the Siegerland, Henry built Ginsburg Castle during his reign.

Henry's brother, Rupert, had joined the Teutonic Order in 1230. On his death in 1239, Rupert bequeathed his legacy to the Order. Henry continuously disputed any division of his realm with the Teutonic Order.

Henry also held the Upper Vogtship over the Diocese of St. George in Limburg an der Lahn during the construction of the Limburg Cathedral. In 1239 he transferred, at the request of his vassal Friedrich vom Hain, the income of the Netphen parishes to the Premonstratensian Keppel Abbey near Hilchenbach. His descendants took over the patronage of the monastery.

Henry's policies in the Herborner Mark angered the local aristocratic families. Around 1240, Henry built Dillenburg Castle to better subjugate the dissidents. By 1248, the century-long Dernbacher Feud had already begun, involving Hesse as well in the context of the War of the Thuringian Succession, because of a feud started by Henry with Sophia of Thuringia and her son Henry I "the Child" of Hesse over the Herborner Mark, which burdened the Nassau-Hessian relationships beyond his death for centuries.

The necrology of Arnstein Abbey documented the death of ‘Henrici comitis de Nassauwe, qui contulit nobis ecclesiam in Diffenbach inferiori ...’ on 26 April. Henry is still mentioned in a charter from 1247 and is listed as deceased in a charter from 25 January 1251. This means that he died on 26 April in either 1247, 1248, 1249 or 1250. He was succeeded by his sons Walram II and Otto I.

== Marriage and children ==
Henry married before 11 December 1215 to Matilda of Guelders and Zutphen (died 28 October 1247 or later), the youngest daughter of Count Otto I of Guelders and Zutphen and Richardis of Bavaria (herself daughter of Otto I Wittelsbach, Duke of Bavaria).
From this marriage were born:

1. Rupert (died 19 September before 1247), was granted allod in Diez and Ober-Lahnstein by the Archbishop of Trier, was a knight of the Teutonic Order.
2. Walram II (c. 1220 – 24 January 1276), succeeded his father as Count of Nassau, is the ancestor of the Walramian Line of the House of Nassau.
3. Otto I (died between 3 May 1289 and 19 March 1290), succeeded his father as Count of Nassau, is the ancestor of the Ottonian Line of the House of Nassau.
4. Henry (died 28 May after 1247), was a monk in Arnstein Abbey.
5. Elizabeth (c. 1225 – after 6 January 1295), married Gerhard III, Lord of Eppstein (died 1252).
6. Gerhard (died between 7 April 1312 and 20 September 1314), was a clergyman.
7. John (died Deventer, 13 July 1309), was Bishop-Elect of Utrecht 1267–1290.
8. Catharine (died 27 April 1324), became Abbess of Altenberg Abbey near Wetzlar in 1249.
9. Jutta (died 1313), married around 1260 to John I, Lord of Cuijk (died 13 July 1308).
10. ? Irmgard (died 1 August 1297), was abbess of Val-Benoît.

== Sources ==
- Becker, E. (1983) [1950]. Schloss und Stadt Dillenburg. Ein Gang durch ihre Geschichte in Mittelalter und Neuzeit. Zur Gedenkfeier aus Anlaß der Verleihung der Stadtrechte am 20. September 1344 herausgegeben [Castle and City Dillenburg. A Journey through their History in Medieval and Modern Times. Published to celebrate the grant of Town Privileges on 20 September 1344] (in German) (2nd ed.). Dillenburg: Der Magistrat der Stadt Dillenburg.
- Dek, A.W.E. (1970). Genealogie van het Vorstenhuis Nassau [Genealogy of the Royal House of Nassau] (in Dutch). Zaltbommel: Europese Bibliotheek. OCLC 27365371.
- Huberty, Michel; Giraud, Alain; Magdelaine, F. & B. (1981). l'Allemagne Dynastique. Tome III Brunswick-Nassau-Schwarzbourg [German Dynasties. Volume III Brunswick-Nassau-Schwarzburg] (in French). Le Perreux: Alain Giraud.
- Japikse, N. (1948). De Geschiedenis van het Huis van Oranje-Nassau [The History of the House of Orange-Nassau] (in Dutch) (2nd ed.). The Hague: Zuid-Hollandse Uitgevers Maatschappij. OCLC 66702287.
- Joachim, Ernst (1880). "Heinrich II., Graf von Nassau" [Henry II, Count of Nassau]. Allgemeine Deutsche Biographie [Universal German Biography] (in German). Vol. Band 11. Leipzig: Duncker & Humblot. p. 547.
- Lück, Alfred (1981) [1967]. Siegerland und Nederland [Siegerland and The Netherlands] (in German) (2nd ed.). Siegen: Siegerländer Heimatverein e.V.
- Schwennicke, Detlev (1998). Europäische Stammtafeln, Neue Folge [European Genealogies, New Series] (in German). Vol. Band I. Frankfurt am Main: Vittorio Klostermann GmbH. ISBN 3-465-02743-4. Table 60.
- Thiele, Andreas (1994). Erzählende genealogische Stammtafeln zur europäischen Geschichte, Band I, Teilband 2: Deutsche Kaiser-, Königs-, Herzogs- und Grafenhäuser II [Annotated genealogies from European History, Volume 1, Part 2: German Imperial, Royal, Ducal and Comital Houses II] (in German) (2nd ed.). Frankfurt am Main: RG Fischer Verlag. ISBN 3-89501-023-5.
- Venne, J.M. van der; Stols, Alexander A.M. (1937). "Gerhard graaf van Nassau, 1259-1313. De oudst bekende Nassau in Nederland?" [Gerhard Count of Nassau, 1259-1313. The eldest known Nassau in the Netherlands?]. De Nederlandsche Leeuw, Maandblad van het Koninklijk Nederlandsch Genootschap voor Geslacht- en Wapenkunde [The Dutch Lion, Monthly Journal of the Royal Dutch Society for Genealogy and Heraldry] (in Dutch). 1937 (2).
- Vorsterman van Oyen, A.A. (1882). Het vorstenhuis Oranje-Nassau. Van de vroegste tijden tot heden [The Royal House of Orange-Nassau. From the earliest days until the present] (in Dutch). Leiden & Utrecht: A.W. Sijthoff & J.L. Beijers.

German nobility
Preceded by Walram I	Count of Nassau (with Rupert IV); 1198–1247	Succeeded by Walram II and Otto I
