= John I of Nassau-Beilstein =

Count of Nassau-Beilstein (1412–1473)

John I
- Count of Nassau-Beilstein
- Reign: 1412-1473
- Predecessor: Henry II
- Successor: Henry IV
- Died: July 1473
- Noble family: House of Nassau
- Spouses: Matilda of Isenburg-Grenzau; Johanna von Gemen
- Father: Henry II, Count of Nassau-Beilstein
- Mother: Catherine of Randerode

Coat of arms of the Ottonian line of the House of Nassau

John I, Count of Nassau-Beilstein (died July 1473) was the eldest son of Henry II and his wife Catherine of Randerode. A member of the Ottonian branch of the House of Nassau, John succeeded his father as Count of Nassau-Beilstein in 1412 and reigned until his death in 1473.

== Biography ==
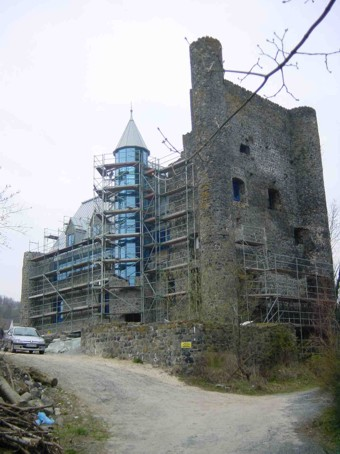
Beilstein Castle

Following the death of Henry II, John ruled jointly with his uncle Reinhard.

In 1413, around one year after inheriting Nassau-Beilstein, John was pressured into pledging the Kalenberger Zent judicial district to Philipp I, Count of Nassau-Weilburg due to poor finances. The same year, John negotiated a 2,000-mark settlement of a 1341 inheritance division with contemporary John I, Count of Nassau-Siegen. John married Matilda of Isenburg-Grenzau in 1415, who brought tithes in Oberbrechen as her dowry. The marriage would produce three children: Margaret, Philip, and Elisabeth.

Reinhard died sometime between 1414 and 1418, leaving John as the sole Count for a short window while both of his brothers were ineligible as members of the clergy. Nassau-Beilstein was partitioned between John and his brother Henry III in 1425. John would retain control of two thirds of the county, including the village of Beilstein and its castle, while Henry received the remaining territory, which contained the castle in Liebenscheid. The third brother, William, renounced his claim.

John was forced into recognizing the suzerainty of the Electorate of Trier over Nassau-Beilstein in 1418, conflicting with his efforts of consolidation started by his father. After redeeming the Kalenberger Zent, John pledged the territory to Trier.

John's son Philip had claims to the County of Isenburg-Grenzau, as his maternal uncle, Philip of Isenburg-Grenzau, was childless. To enforce these rights, John allied with Philip's brothers-in-law against Diether of Isenburg-Büdingen, who had seized the lordship under an inheritance treaty. Following the uncle's death in either 1439 or 1440, John secured the title for his son, who assumed the title Lord of Grenzau. Further inheritance feuds among the heirs followed. In the 1430s and 1440s, additional conflicts broke out between John and the nobility of Westerburg over a dispute regarding the Barony of Westerwald, which were resolved in John's favor.

In 1444, John pledged the Oberbrechen tithes and the county was unable to financially redeem them.

=== Soest Feud and onwards (1444-1473) ===
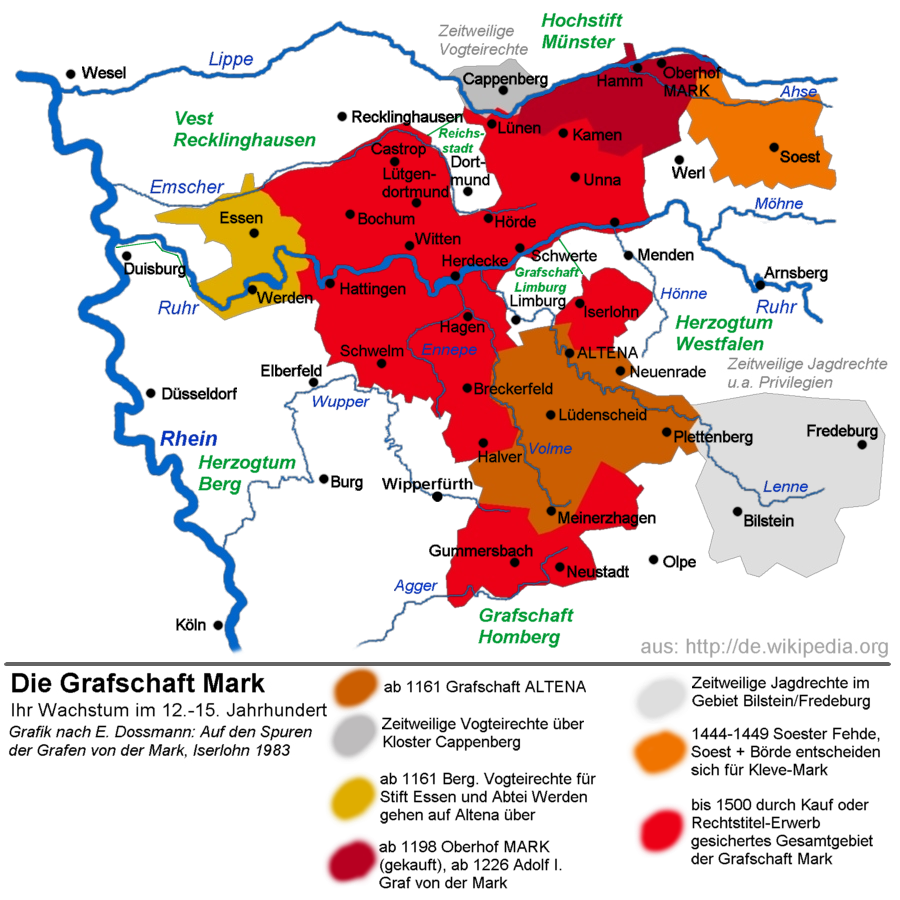
Map of territorial changes following the Soest feud

During the 1444-1449 Soest Feud, John and his son Philip sided with the Electorate of Cologne. Philip was killed during the conflict on 29 October 1446, and as a result, the County of Nassau-Beilstein lost its claim to Grenzau. In order to preserve these inheritance claims, John remarried to Philip's former betrothed, Johanna von Gemen. With John's second marriage came a new male heir, Henry, born in 1449.

John fought alongside Henry in the Hessian Fratricidal War of 1469 on the side of the Landgrave of Upper Hesse. Henry succeeded John as Count of Nassau-Beilstein as Henry IV, Count of Nassau following his death in July 1473.

== Marriages and children ==
With Matilda of Isenburg-Grenzau (died after 1436), daughter of Lord Everhard of Isenburg-Grenzau and Matilda van de Mark (m. 1415):

- Margaret (died after 1498), married firstly John, Lord of Schöneck (1442), and secondly Maurice I, Count of Pyrmont (before 1462).
- Philip, Lord of Grenzau (died 29 October 1446 at Soest), betrothed to Johanna von Gemen.
- Elisabeth (died 1459), married Otto, Lord of Bronckhorst and Borculo (1440).

With Johanna von Gemen (died before 1451), daughter of Lord John of Gemen and Bredevoort (m. 1447):

- Henry IV (1449–1499), succeeded his father as Count of Nassau-Beilstein.

John also had three illegitimate children whose mother or mothers are unknown:

- Henne van Nassau (died before 1508), married Catherine (1451).
- Christian van Nassau, received a fief from his father in 1452; married Sophia Feije (1479).
- Heintze van Nassau, served as a bailiff in Beilstein in 1479.

John I of Nassau-Beilstein House of Nassau Died: July 1473
Preceded by Henry II	Count of Nassau-Beilstein; 1412-1473; With: Reinhard and Henry III	Succeeded by Henry IV

== Sources ==
- Vorsterman van Oyen, Anthonie Abraham (1882). Het vorstenhuis Oranje-Nassau: Van de vroegste tijden tot heden (in Dutch). Leiden and Utrecht: A.W. Sijthoff and J.L. Beijers.
- Schwennicke, Detlev (1978–1982). Europäische Stammtafeln: Stammtafeln zur Geschichte europäischen Staaten. Neue Folge (in German). Marburg.
- Giraud, Alain; Huberty, Michel; Magdelaine, François (1981). L’Allemagne Dynastique. Tome III: Brunswick-Nassau-Schwarzbourg (in French). Le Perreux-sur-Marne: A. Giraud.
- Hollmann, Michael; Wettengel, Michael (1992). Nassaus Beitrag für das heutige Hessen (in German). Wiesbaden: Hessische Landeszentrale für politische Bildung. p. 98.
- Gensicke, Hellmuth (1999). Landesgeschichte des Westerwaldes (in German) (3rd ed.). Wiesbaden: Historische Kommission für Nassau. pp. 283–285.
- Dek, Adriaan Willem Eliza (1970). Genealogie van het Vorstenhuis Nassau (in Dutch). Zaltbommel: Europese Bibliotheek.
- Arnoldi, Johann (1799). Geschichte der Oranien-Nassauischen Länder und ihrer Regenten (in German). Wiesbaden: Neue Gelehrtenbuchhandlung. pp. 157–168.
- Diemar, Hermann (1906). "Ludwig II. (Landgraf von Hessen)". Allgemeine Deutsche Biographie (in German). Vol. 52. Leipzig: Duncker & Humblot. pp. 557–562.
