= Arnstein Abbey =

Premonstratensian abbey near Nassau, Germany

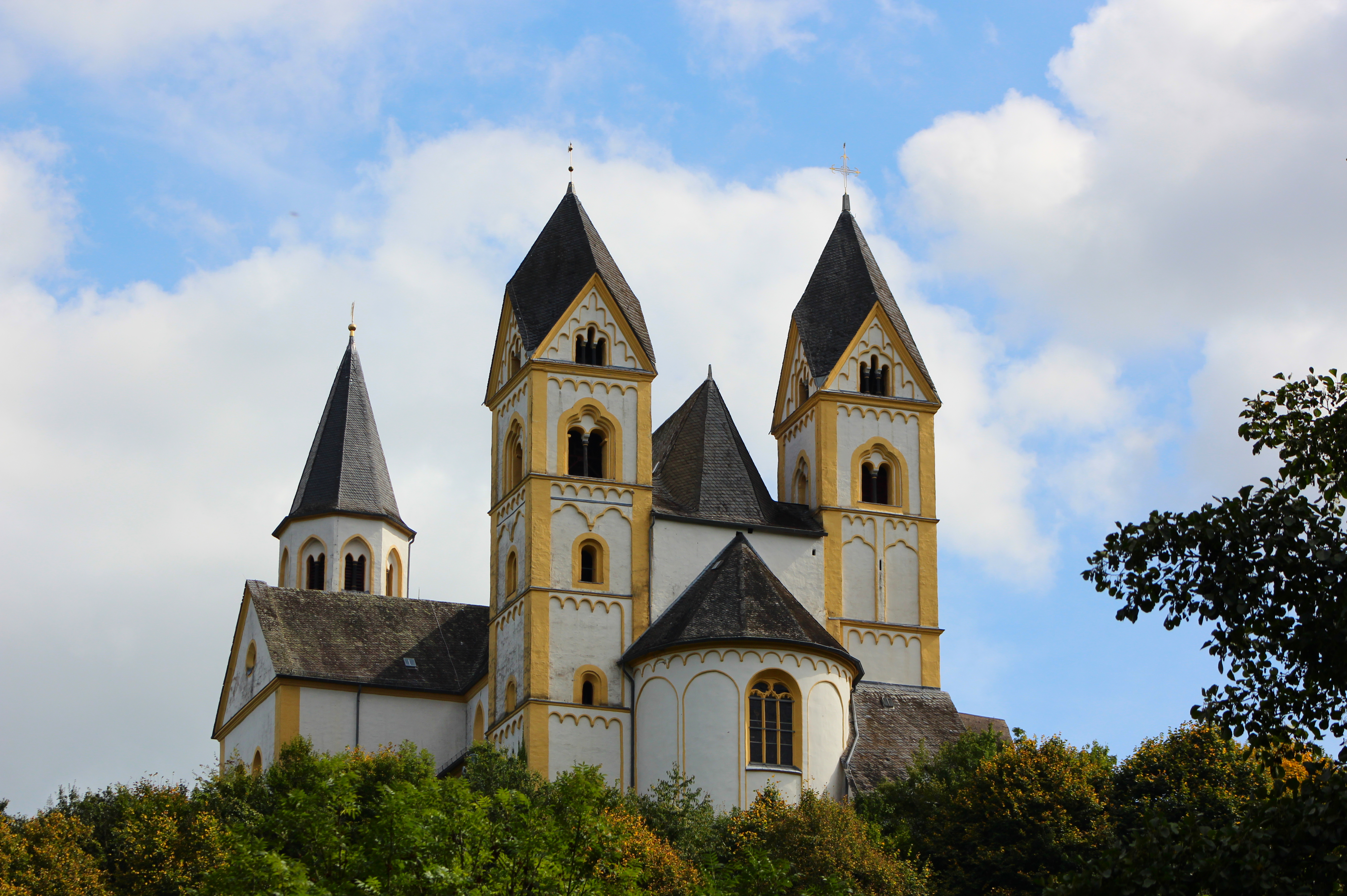
- Arnstein Abbey
- Interactive map of Arnstein Abbey

Monastery information
- Full name: Kloster Arnstein
- Other names: Heilige Patriarchale Stavropegialkloster Dionysios Trikkis & Stagon
- Order: Premonstratensian (1139-1803), Congregation of the Sacred Hearts of Jesus and Mary (1918-2018) Eastern Orthodox (2019-present)
- Established: 1139
- Diocese: Stavropegion of the Patriarch of Serbia

People
- Founder: Count Louis III of Arnstein

Site
- Location: Near Obernhof, Rhineland-Palatinate, Germany.
- Coordinates: 50°18′37″N 7°51′6″E

Arnstein Abbey (German: Kloster Arnstein) is a former Premonstratensian abbey on the Lahn River, south of present-day Obernhof near Nassau, Germany. It was a monastery of the Congregation of the Sacred Hearts of Jesus and Mary (SS.CC.), known in Germany as the "Arnsteiner Fathers" (Arnsteiner Patres), who maintained a youth retreat center there until 2018. Since 2019, the abbey has been inhabited by Orthodox nuns under the omophorion of the Patriarch of Serbia. However, an article from 2023 states that the canonical affiliation of the monastery is currently unclear.

== History ==
The history of the monastery dates back to the second half of the 11th century. In 1052, an Arnstein Castle on the Lahn is first mentioned as the seat of the Counts of Arnstein. This is the oldest mention of any castle on the river. Nothing remains of the structures of that period.

In 1139 Louis (Ludwig) III, the last Count of Arnstein, transformed his castle into a Premonstratensian monastery and himself joined the order. His wife lived until her death as hermit near the monastery. In the same year, Lugwig began the partial demolition of the castle. In 1145, King Conrad III confirmed the abbey as directly under the Empire. From 1236, a branch monastery, Keppel Abbey at Hilchenbach, was established under the patronage of the House of Nassau.

Burials in the monastery include Count Walram I of Nassau in 1198. Walram's grandson Henry (Heinrich) (son of Count Henry II of Nassau) became a monk in Arnstein Abbey in 1247.

In 1360, the monastery church was completed. The structure includes individual components which have been dated to the 12th century.

With the conversion of the Princes of Nassau to Protestantism in the 16th century, the Archbishopric of Trier assumed the patronage of the Abbey.

In 1803, the monastery was dissolved during secularization and came into the possession of the Principality of Nassau-Weilburg.

In 1919 the Congregation of the Sacred Hearts of Jesus and Mary established Arnstein as their first monastery in Germany. The Superior and Vice-Provincial of the monastery, Pater Alfons Spix, died in 1942 in the Dachau concentration camp, because he let the Polish forced laborers participate in worship and gave them breakfast.

In October 2015 the order informed the dioceses that they will leave the abbey at the end of 2018 citing personal and financial resources as the reason.

In 2019, an Orthodox monastic sisterhood moved into the monastery, under the spiritual guidance of the Greek elder Dionysios. The abbess of the monastery is Mother Diodora.

== See also ==
- List of Christian monasteries in Rhineland-Palatinate
- List of Christian monasteries in Germany
